= Tayyab Husain =

Indian politician

Chaudhary Tayyab Husain
- Official portrait, 1998

Member of Parliament, Lok Sabha
- In office 18 January 1980 – 31 December 1984
- Preceded by: Dharam Vir Vasisht
- Succeeded by: Chaudhary Rahim Khan
- Constituency: Faridabad, Haryana
- In office 10 March 1971 – 20 March 1977
- Preceded by: Abdul Ghani Dar
- Succeeded by: Constituency abolished
- Constituency: Gurgaon, Haryana
State Government Ministries and Portfolios
Minister of Agriculture, Government of Rajasthan
In office 25 November 1998 – 8 December 2003
Additional Ministries and Departments	Groundwater; Rural Development; Medical and Health
Chief Minister	Ashok Gehlot
Governor	Anshuman Singh; Nirmal Chandra Jain
Preceded by	Prabhu Lal Saini
Succeeded by	Prabhu Lal Saini
Home Minister, Government of Haryana
In office 16 June 1988 – 6 April 1991
Additional Ministries and Departments	Waqf; Fisheries; Development & Panchayat; Agriculture; Revenue; Finance; Planning; Institutional Finance & Credit Control
Chief Minister	Devi Lal; Om Prakash Chautala; Banarsi Das Gupta; Hukum Singh
Governor	Hari Anand Barari; Dhanik Lal Mandal
Preceded by	Rao Narbir Singh
Succeeded by	Sampat Singh
Minister of State, Government of Punjab
In office 8 February 1962 – 21 June 1964
Ministry and Departments	Health; Public Works
Chief Minister	Partap Singh Kairon
Cabinet Minister	Brish Bhan (Health); Chaudhary Ranbir Singh (PWD)
Governor	Pattom A. Thanu Pillai; Hafiz Mohamad Ibrahim

Personal details
- Born: 5 April 1936 Village Rehna, Punjab Province, British India (present-day Nuh, Haryana, India)
- Died: 7 October 2008 Gurgaon, Haryana
- Party: Indian National Congress
- Other political affiliations: Indian National Congress (I), Indian National Congress (Jagjivan), Lokdal
- Children: 4, including Zakir Hussain, Zahida Khan, Fazal Hussain
- Parent: Yasin Khan
- Education: Aligarh Muslim University
- Profession: Politician, advocate

Chaudhary Tayyab Husain (7 September 1936 – 7 October 2008) was an Indian politician, who served as a Member of Parliament from Gurgaon and Faridabad in the Lok Sabha. He also served as the Minister of Agriculture of Rajasthan, Home Minister of Haryana and Minister of State for Health of Punjab.

He holds the rare distinction of being elected as a Member of the Legislative Assembly to three different Indian states and serving as a minister in the cabinet of all three.

He was elected a Member of the Punjab, Haryana and Rajasthan Legislative Assemblies six times on different occasions with a political career spanning over 40 years.

== Early life ==
Husain was born on 7 September 1936 to Yasin Khan and Jummi Begum in the village of Rehna in the Punjab Province of British India (modern-day Haryana). His father was a prominent political and social leader in the Mewat region of India. His father was a Member of the Punjab Provincial Assembly and the Punjab Legislative Assembly for over 30 years.

Husain completed his primary education in Gurgaon. His academic life, however, was interrupted by the 1947 partition of India. During this time he temporary relocated to Santhawari village in the present-day Nuh district for a few years. Following his return to Nuh city, he graduated from Brayne Meo High School (now Yasin Meo Degree College) in 1953.

Although Husain had been betrothed to Jamila Begum at the age of three and a half, the couple officially married in 1953 following his high school graduation. Husain was only seventeen years old at the time of his marriage.

After graduating in law from Aligarh Muslim University, Husain served twice as the General Secretary of Aligarh Muslim University Old Boys Association (AMUOBA). While studying at Aligarh Muslim University, he balanced his education with caring for his father, Yasin Khan, who was in poor health at the time. He was a founding member of the India Islamic Cultural Centre at New Delhi.

Husain had two sons, Zakir Hussain and Fazal Hussain, and two daughters, Zahida Khan and Ayesha Bano.

== Political career ==
Husain was a career politician who is associated in recent times with Aaya Ram Gaya Ram politics. He switched parties 3 times in one MLA term. He has been associated with the Indian National Congress, Indian National Congress (I), Indian National Congress (Jagjivan) and the Lokdal party. He was a prominent political figure in Indian politics, even in the early years of his career.

=== Entry into politics under the support of Pratap Singh Karion ===
In 1960, Husain entered politics after being elected unopposed as the sarpanch of the village of Rehna, where he was born. Alongside his local administrative duties, he assumed the editorship of the Urdu newspaper, Mewat Gazette, which had been established in 1958 by Hakim Ajmal Khan.

In 1961, Husain was elected as a member of the Nuh Panchayat Samiti and subsequently positioned himself as a leading candidate for its chairmanship, securing majority support among its members. However, his candidacy faced strong opposition from Rao Birender Singh. Singh, using his ministerial powers at the time, repeatedly postponed the samiti elections in an attempt to garner support for his own preferred candidate. This factional rivalry extended into the District Congress Committee of Gurgaon, where Singh opposed long-standing District President Roop Lal Mehta and Secretary Vidya Ratan, ultimately cancelling their party memberships. Singh similarly revoked the memberships of Husain, alongside Rao Abhay Singh and Rao Jai Narayan of Rewari from the Indian National Congress. The escalating political dispute led to a confrontation within the state government. Chief Minister Pratap Singh Kairon intervened, demanding Singh's resignation from the cabinet. When Singh refused and instead appealed to the Governor for the dismissal of Kairon's government, Kairon dismissed him from the ministry. Following the ouster of his political rival, Pratap Singh Kairon, who was a long-time associate of Husain's father, Yasin Khan, encouraged Husain to assume a prominent leadership role within the Mewat region.

As his father continued face illness during this time, Husain faced political challenges as local rivals and former allies sought to capitalize on the impending leadership vacuum in the Mewat region. Despite these domestic pressures, he maintained continued support of Punjab Chief Minister Pratap Singh Kairon and the local communities. To discuss the political future of the region, Husain met the Chief Minister, deciding that the ailing Yasin Khan was unfit to contest the upcoming Punjab Legislative Assembly election, Kairon advised Husain to contest the Ferozepur Jhirka constituency instead and tasked him with identifying a suitable Congress Party candidate for the Nuh constituency. Husain subsequently invited his friend, Khurshid Ahmed, who was then a practicing lawyer at the Alwar Court—to contest the Nuh seat under the Indian National Congress. When Husain introduced Ahmed to Kairon, the Chief Minister approved the nomination but explicitly delegated the political responsibility for Ahmed's campaign to Husain.

In 1962, he was elected to the Punjab Legislative Assembly, and became the youngest minister in Partap Singh Kairon's government at age 26. The very next month Husain was also elected chairman of the Block Samiti.

=== Contributions during the Sino-Indian War, 1962 ===
During the Sino-Indian War in October 1962, Husain mobilized local war relief initiatives, supported national unity campaigns, and organized defense fund collections. He collaborated with Central Government Minister Hafiz Muhammad Ibrahim and Nawab Aminuddin Ahmad Khan of Loharu to coordinate fundraising efforts, resulting in significant contributions deposited into the government treasury.

=== Relief efforts during the Indo-Pakistani War, 1965 ===
Following the outbreak of the Indo-Pakistani War on 5 September 1965, Husain organized regional rallies to promote national solidarity. He managed defense fund collections and worked closely with Punjab Welfare Minister Chand Ram, who oversaw defense welfare operations in the Gurgaon and Mewat areas.

During this period, Husain presented several defense fund contributions collected from these public gatherings. On 20 September 1965, he presented ₹40,000 to Union Minister Humayun Kabir at a rally, followed by a contribution of two lakh rupees delivered to the Deputy Commissioner of Gurgaon during a rally in Nuh on 25 September. His efforts culminated at a regional rally in Gurgaon on 28 September 1965, where Punjab Chief Minister Ram Kishan publicly commended Husain and the residents of Mewat for their contributions to the national war effort.

=== Tenure as Waqf Board Chairman (1965–1978) ===
In November 1965, Husain was appointed Chairman of the Punjab Waqf Board. Following the creation of Haryana on 1 November 1966, he utilized provisions under the Punjab Reorganisation Act, 1966, alongside support from Union Minister for Waqf, Fakhruddin Ali Ahmed, to successfully maintain the board as an undivided composite entity governing the newly formed states of Punjab, Haryana, and Himachal Pradesh. As chairman of this interstate board, Husain initiated comprehensive institutional reforms. He ordered systematic surveys of Waqf properties, managed their gazette notification, and ensured their formal documentation in state revenue records. Under his leadership, the board's financial resources were expanded, with its revenues restructured to provide institutional aid to schools. Furthermore, he supervised efforts to recover thousands of vacant or encroached mosques across Punjab and Haryana, rehabilitating them through the appointment of regular Imams and Muezzins. During this tenure, Husain proposed the development of a central mosque to the state administration, securing land from a green belt area through Chief Minister Pratap Singh Kairon. Funded by the Punjab Waqf Board, this initiative resulted in the construction of the Jama Masjid in Sector 20, Chandigarh.

=== Death of Yasin Khan and Succession (1970) ===
Throughout his early political career, Husain managed the primary care of his ailing father, Yasin Khan, who continued his regular public travels despite deteriorating health. On 19 February 1970, during a tour of Ghotu Bilaspur village in Alwar, Rajasthan, Yasin Khan passed away. As the eldest son, Husain succeeded his father as the prominent community leader of the Mewat region.

On 30 March 1970, coinciding with his father's Chaliswaan (the traditional fortieth day of mourning), a formal Pagbandi (turban-tying) succession ceremony was held in Nuh. The event was attended by representatives across regional communities, including the leaders of the 12 Pals and 52 Gotras of the Meos, alongside community elders from the Jatiyat, Ahirwal, and Gujrot regions. The attendees unanimously recognized Husain as the successor to Yasin Khan's leadership.

Notable attendees included the Jammu and Kashmir Chief Minister Sheikh Abdullah. Following his succession, Husain was invited to Pakistan by Meo diaspora communities. Accompanied by his sons, Zakir Hussain and Fazal Hussain, he toured several Meo settlements across Pakistan, where he was formally recognized and honored with parallel Pagbandi ceremonies.

=== Entry into national politics ===
Following his formal succession as community leader in March 1970, Husain entered national politics. Husain was elected as a Member of Parliament in the Lok Sabha from the Gurgaon constituency in 1971. He became the first Meo representative to be elected to the Lok Sabha from the Mewat region. In 1973, Husain was re-elected as the Chairman of the Punjab Waqf Board, an institutional role he maintained until 1978. He was later elected to the Lok Sabha again from the Faridabad constituency in 1980. His national legislative career officially ended once he was defeated by Chaudhary Rahim Khan in the 1984 Lok Sabha elections.

=== Return into state-level politics ===
Following his tenures in national parliament, Husain returned to state-level politics, establishing a rare distinction in Indian political history by serving as a cabinet minister in three separate states: Punjab, Haryana, and Rajasthan. Having previously served as a Minister of State for Public Works and Health in the undivided Punjab government from 1962–1964) he was elected to the Haryana Legislative Assembly from the Taoru constituency in 1984. From 1988 to 1991, he served as the Home Minister of Haryana under Chief Minister Devi Lal, concurrently managing portfolios including Finance, Revenue, and Agriculture.

Husain later shifted his political base to Rajasthan, winning election to the state's legislative assembly from the Kaman constituency in 1993 and 1998.Following his 1998 victory, he was appointed the Minister of Agriculture for Rajasthan under Chief Minister Ashok Gehlot, whilst also holding the portfolios of Ground Water, Rural Development, and Health. It was during his tenure as Rajasthan's Agriculture Minister that he met with U.S. President Bill Clinton in March 2000.

Husain shaking hands with U.S. President Bill Clinton during Clinton's visit to India in March 2000.

=== Positions held ===
#	From	To	Position	Party
1.	1962	1967	MLA from Ferozepur Jhirka, Punjab	INC
2.	1971	1976	MP in 6th Lok Sabha from Gurgaon, Haryana	INC
3.	1980	1984	MP in 7th Lok Sabha from Faridabad, Haryana	INC(I)
4.	1984	1987	MLA from Taoru, Haryana	ICJ
5.	1987	1988	MLA from Taoru, Haryana	INC
6.	1988	1991	MLA from Taoru, Haryana	LKD
7.	1993	2003	MLA from Kaman, Rajasthan	INC

=== Ministries held ===
- Minister of State for Public Works Department & Health in the Government of Punjab (1962-1964)
- Minister of Home, Waqf, Fisheries, Development & Panchayat, Agriculture, Revenue, Finance, Planning, Institutional Finance & Credit Control in the Government of Haryana. (1962-1964)
- Minister of Agriculture, Groundwater, Rural Development, Medical & Health in the Government of Rajasthan (1998-2003)

== Controversies ==
=== Involvement in instigating 1993 Mewat Riots ===
Following the demolition of the Babri Masjid in December 1992, communal violence broke out in the Mewat region of then Haryana's Gurgaon district (modern-day Nuh district). The unrest, which marked a rare instance of communal tension in the historically peaceful region, saw widespread rioting across Nuh, Punhana, and Pinangwan. According to reports, the initial violence was allegedly instigated by local politician Khurshid Ahmed, who, along with his son Aftab Ahmed, faced police charges for the unrest.

During this period, Tayyab Husain and his son, Zakir Hussain, then the MLA for the neighboring Taoru constituency, were also implicated in the controversy. Local accounts and contemporary media reports noted that the unrest was exacerbated by deep-seated local political rivalries, with members of the Muslim community accusing both the Ahmed and Husain families of attempting to exploit the communal volatility to expand their respective political bases among the Meo population. The riots resulted in significant distrust toward local law enforcement, who were widely criticized for their delayed response and subsequent handling of the situation.

As the Meo community suffered heavily during the violence, Husain heavily criticized and protested against the state administration under Haryana Chief Minister Bhajan Lal. To address the crisis and bypass local administrative shortcomings, Husain facilitated the political intervention of senior central leadership, bringing Union Minister Ghulam Nabi Azad to the region.

== Later life and death ==
Husain remained president of All India Mewati Panchayat, the Mewat Education Board and Governing Body, and the Yasin Meo Degree College until his death. Husain later died in the city of Gurgaon on 7 October 2008.

A question relating to Husain was asked on the 7th season of the Indian game show, Kaun Banega Crorepati.
