= Taoru Assembly constituency =

Former constituency of the Haryana legislative assembly in India

Coordinates: 28.22°N 76.95°E

Taoru
- Former constituency for the Haryana Legislative Assembly

Constituency details
- Country: India
- Region: North India
- State: Haryana
- District: Mewat
- Lok Sabha constituency: Faridabad
- Established: 1977
- Abolished: 2005
- Total electors: 1,51,648

Taoru was an Assembly constituency in the Nuh district (then Mewat district) of the Indian state of Haryana. It used to be under the Faridabad Lok Sabha constituency.

The constituency was later merged into the Sohna Assembly constituency which under the Gurgaon Lok Sabha constituency. The Tayyab Hussain clan had been elected from this constituency the greatest number of times.

== Members of the Legislative Assembly ==
Election	Member	Party
1977	Khurshid Ahmed	Janata Party
1982	Kabir Ahmad	Indian National Congress
1984^	Tayyab Husain	Indian National Congress (J)
1987	Tayyab Husain	Indian National Congress
1988^	Tayyab Husain	Lokdal
1991	Zakir Hussain	Independent politician
1996	Suraj Pal Singh	Bharatiya Janata Party
2000	Zakir Hussain	Indian National Congress
2005	Sahida	Indian National Lok Dal

^By-election

== Election results ==
=== Assembly Election 2005 ===
2005 Haryana Legislative Assembly election: Taoru
Party	Candidate	Votes	%	±%
INLD	Sahida	34,194	31.40%	New
INC	Zakir Hussain	33,230	30.51%	▼19.31
BJP	Sanjay	24,653	22.64%	▼15.91
BSP	Nihal Singh	8,464	7.77%	▲3.07
Independent	Leela Wati	7,534	6.92%	New
Independent	Nain Singh	791	0.73%	New
Margin of victory		964	0.89%	▼10.39
Turnout		1,08,914	71.82%	▲0.08
Registered electors		1,51,648		▲20.11
INLD gain from INC		Swing	▼18.42	

=== Assembly Election 2000 ===
2000 Haryana Legislative Assembly election: Taoru
Party	Candidate	Votes	%	±%
INC	Zakir Hussain	45,126	49.82%	▲28.22
BJP	Suraj Pal Singh	34,916	38.55%	▲3.49
Independent	Subhash Chand	4,279	4.72%	New
BSP	Hidayat Khan	4,262	4.71%	▼0.09
HVP	Dharamvir	1,786	1.97%	New
Margin of victory		10,210	11.27%	▼2.19
Turnout		90,582	73.12%	▲3.24
Registered electors		1,26,261		▲1.08
INC gain from BJP		Swing	▲14.76	

=== Assembly Election 1996 ===
1996 Haryana Legislative Assembly election: Taoru
Party	Candidate	Votes	%	±%
BJP	Suraj Pal Singh	29,995	35.06%	▲4.13
INC	Zakir Hussain	18,480	21.60%	▲17.04
AIIC(T)	Aftab Ahmad	16,844	19.69%	New
JD	Ravinder Kumar	7,054	8.24%	▼3.68
BSP	Tek Chand	4,100	4.79%	New
Independent	Vijay Singh S/O Dhoop Singh	3,615	4.22%	New
SP	Kamrudin	2,195	2.57%	New
SAP	Mohd. Yakub Khan	1,602	1.87%	New
Margin of victory		11,515	13.46%	▲5.39
Turnout		85,564	71.26%	▲2.20
Registered electors		1,24,909		▲13.26
BJP gain from Independent		Swing	▼3.94	

=== Assembly Election 1991 ===
1991 Haryana Legislative Assembly election: Taoru
Party	Candidate	Votes	%	±%
Independent	Zakir Hussain	28,513	39.00%	New
BJP	Suraj Pal Singh	22,613	30.93%	New
JP	Rajender	9,024	12.34%	New
JD	Mohd. Yakub Khan	8,716	11.92%	New
INC	Wali Mohammad	3,336	4.56%	New
Independent	Kanahiya Singh	375	0.51%	New
Margin of victory		5,900	8.07%	
Turnout		73,117	70.07%	
Registered electors		1,10,282		
Independent gain from LKD		Swing		

=== Assembly By-election 1988 ===
1988 Haryana Legislative Assembly by-election: Taoru
Party	Candidate	Votes	%	±%
LKD	Tayab Hussain	43,207		
INC	H. Khan	5,606		
Independent	P. C. Premi	4,657		New
Independent	I. Hussain	285		New
Independent	Habib	174		New
Margin of victory		37,601		
LKD gain from INC		Swing		

=== Assembly Election 1987 ===
1987 Haryana Legislative Assembly election: Taoru
Party	Candidate	Votes	%	±%
INC	Tayab Hussain	41,873	53.11%	New
Independent	Ravinder Kumar	30,839	39.11%	New
LKD	Subrabi Khan	4,883	6.19%	New
Margin of victory		11,034	13.99%	
Turnout		78,846	79.76%	
Registered electors		99,957		
INC gain from INC(J)		Swing		

=== Assembly By-election 1984 ===
1984 Haryana Legislative Assembly by-election: Taoru
Party	Candidate	Votes	%	±%
INC(J)	Tayab Hussain	25,570		New
INC	Kabir Ahmad	22,387		
Independent	R. Kumar	11,919		New
BJP	B. M. Ram	2,004		New
INC(J) gain from INC		Swing		

=== Assembly Election 1982 ===
1982 Haryana Legislative Assembly election: Taoru
Party	Candidate	Votes	%	±%
INC	Kabir Ahmad	17,531	30.50%	▲7.50
Independent	Ravinder Kumar	13,687	23.81%	New
Independent	Hammid Hussain	12,079	21.02%	New
Independent	Suraj Pal Singh	6,033	10.50%	New
LKD	Shyam Raj Singh	3,744	6.51%	New
Independent	Sirraj	1,509	2.63%	New
Independent	Liaka	661	1.15%	New
Independent	Usman Khan	495	0.86%	New
CPI	Prem Dutt	481	0.84%	New
Independent	Giasi	461	0.80%	New
Margin of victory		3,844	6.69%	▼27.56
Turnout		57,477	70.83%	▲0.56
Registered electors		83,683		▲20.14
INC gain from JP		Swing	▼26.75	

=== Assembly Election 1977 ===
1977 Haryana Legislative Assembly election: Taoru
Party	Candidate	Votes	%	±%
JP	Khurshed Ahmed	27,167	57.25%	New
INC	Tayab Hussain	10,913	23.00%	New
Independent	Girraj Singh	4,642	9.78%	New
Independent	Ramji Lal Dagar	3,751	7.90%	New
Independent	Bhanwar Singh	554	1.17%	New
RPI	Sopat Rai Bodh	427	0.90%	New
Margin of victory		16,254	34.25%	
Turnout		47,454	69.28%	
Registered electors		69,654		
JP win (new seat)				
