= 1989 elections in India =

1989 Indian elections
- ← 1987 1988 1989 1990 1991 →
- Incumbent Prime Minister: V. P. Singh (NF)
- Next Lok Sabha: 14th

Lok Sabha elections
- Seats contested: 543

Rajya Sabha elections
- Overall control: Janata Dal
- Seats contested: TBD
- Net seat change: TBD

State elections
- States contested: 8
- Net state change: TBD

Elections in the Republic of India in 1989 included the 1989 Indian general election, elections to eight state legislative assemblies and to seats in the Rajya Sabha.

== General election ==
Party	Votes	%	Seats
Indian National Congress	118,894,702	39.53	197
Janata Dal	53,518,521	17.79	143
Bharatiya Janata Party	34,171,477	11.36	85
Communist Party of India (Marxist)	19,691,309	6.55	33
Telugu Desam Party	9,909,728	3.29	2
Communist Party of India	7,734,697	2.57	12
Dravida Munnetra Kazhagam	7,196,099	2.39	0
Bahujan Samaj Party	6,213,390	2.07	3
All India Anna Dravida Munnetra Kazhagam	4,518,649	1.50	11
Janata Party	3,029,743	1.01	0
Shiromani Akali Dal (Simranjit Singh Mann)	2,318,872	0.77	6
Revolutionary Socialist Party	1,854,276	0.62	4
Pattali Makkal Katchi	1,561,371	0.52	0
Doordarshi Party	1,338,566	0.45	0
All India Forward Bloc	1,261,310	0.42	3
Jharkhand Mukti Morcha	1,032,276	0.34	3
Indian Congress (Socialist) – Sarat Chandra Sinha	978,377	0.33	1
Indian Union Muslim League	974,234	0.32	2
Indian People's Front	737,551	0.25	1
Peasants and Workers Party of India	636,589	0.21	0
All India Majlis-e-Ittehadul Muslimeen	617,376	0.21	1
Lok Dal (Bahuguna)	602,110	0.20	0
Bharatiya Republican Paksha	572,434	0.19	0
Karnataka Rajya Ryota Sangha	495,565	0.16	0
Republican Party of India (Khobragade)	468,615	0.16	0
Gorkha National Liberation Front	435,070	0.14	1
Shiromani Akali Dal (Badal)	427,609	0.14	0
Jharkhand Dal	367,838	0.12	0
Kerala Congress (M)	352,191	0.12	1
Shiv Sena	339,426	0.11	1
Marxist Co-ordination Committee	247,013	0.08	1
Nagaland People's Council	239,124	0.08	0
Hindu Mahasabha	217,514	0.07	1
Manipur Peoples Party	147,128	0.05	0
Republican Party of India	129,300	0.04	0
Humanist Party of India	122,947	0.04	0
All India Dalit Muslim Minorities Suraksha Mahasangh	120,159	0.04	0
Maharashtrawadi Gomantak Party	116,392	0.04	1
Kuki National Assembly	108,085	0.04	0
Shiromani Akali Dal	100,570	0.03	0
Marxist Communist Party of India (S.S. Srivastava)	100,300	0.03	0
People's Party of Arunachal	96,181	0.03	0
Uttar Pradesh Republican Party	91,740	0.03	0
Sikkim Sangram Parishad	91,608	0.03	1
Amra Bangali	80,834	0.03	0
Jammu & Kashmir National Conference	71,194	0.02	3
Mizo National Front	70,749	0.02	0
Kerala Congress	68,811	0.02	0
Tharasu Makkal Mandaram	64,885	0.02	0
Democratic Party	43,667	0.01	0
Shoshit Samaj Dal	42,282	0.01	0
Uttarakhand Kranti Dal	39,465	0.01	0
Communist Party of India (Marxist–Leninist)	38,937	0.01	0
Muslim Majlis Uttar Pradesh	25,839	0.01	0
Proutist Bloc Of India	23,331	0.01	0
Jammu & Kashmir Panthers Party	22,625	0.01	0
Bharatiya Jana Sangh	22,446	0.01	0
Karnataka Gana Parishad	19,593	0.01	0
Socialist Party (Lohiya)	17,639	0.01	0
Tamiliar Kazhagam	12,859	0.00	0
Rising Sun Party	12,858	0.00	0
Indian Congress (J) Trikha Group	12,539	0.00	0
Socialist Party	12,430	0.00	0
Socialist Unity Centre of India	8,747	0.00	0
All India Garib Congress	7,635	0.00	0
Hul Jharkhand Party	6,663	0.00	0
Bhatiya Krishi Udyog Sangh	5,895	0.00	0
Lok Party	4,731	0.00	0
Akhil Bhartiya Gorkha League (Budhiman Gurung)	4,426	0.00	0
Shoshit Samaj Party	3,756	0.00	0
Scientific Vedic Revolutionary Party	3,470	0.00	0
Deseeya Karshaka Party	3,059	0.00	0
Akhil Bharatiya Ram Rajya Parishad	2,998	0.00	0
Barat Desam Labour Party	2,944	0.00	0
Progressive Hul Jharkhand	2,890	0.00	0
Republicon Presidium Party	2,791	0.00	0
West Orissa Peoples Front	2,682	0.00	0
West Bengal Socialist Party (Biman Mitra)	2,411	0.00	0
All India Shiromani Baba Jiwan Singh Mazhbi Dal	2,368	0.00	0
Akhil Bhartiya Hindustani Krantikari Samajwadi Party	2,263	0.00	0
Green Party of India	2,142	0.00	0
Akhil Baratiya Pichhra Varg Party	2,055	0.00	0
Tamil Nadu Peoples Welfare Association	1,964	0.00	0
Sadharam Rajya Parishad	1,928	0.00	0
Indian National Congress (O) Anti-Merger Group	1,735	0.00	0
Gujarat Janata Parishad	1,577	0.00	0
All India Justice Party	1,428	0.00	0
Peoples Democracy of India	1,392	0.00	0
Punjab Peoples Party	1,374	0.00	0
Hindustan Janata Party	1,361	0.00	0
Bharatha Makkal Congress	1,357	0.00	0
Deccan Congress	1,332	0.00	0
Akhil Bhartiya Lok Tantrik Party	1,272	0.00	0
Vijaya Shakti	1,093	0.00	0
Bhartiya Loktantrik Mazdoor Dal	1,035	0.00	0
Pandav Dal	918	0.00	0
National Republican Party	839	0.00	0
Bhartiya Loktantrik Mazdoor Sangh	703	0.00	0
Mahabharat Peoples Party	694	0.00	0
Indian Union Muslim League (IML)	687	0.00	0
Manipur Peoples Council	677	0.00	0
Vishal Bharat Pary	621	0.00	0
Republican Party of India (Gavai Group)	539	0.00	0
Punjab Kairon Dal	493	0.00	0
Peoples Party of India	478	0.00	0
Indian Labour Party	406	0.00	0
Socialist Labour League	391	0.00	0
Bharatiya Krantikari Kisan Sang	367	0.00	0
Kamaraj Desiya Congress	322	0.00	0
Punjab Naya Front	314	0.00	0
Hindu Shiv Sena	160	0.00	0
Bhartiya Lok Kalyan Dal	145	0.00	0
Labour Party of India	99	0.00	0
Independents	15,793,781	5.25	12
Nominated Anglo-Indians			2
Total	300,776,423	100.00	531
Valid votes	300,776,423	97.32	
Invalid/blank votes	8,274,072	2.68	
Total votes	309,050,495	100.00	
Registered voters/turnout	498,906,129	61.95	
Source: ECI

== Overall result ==
Date(s)	State	Government before	Chief Minister before	Government after	Elected Chief Minister	Maps
21 January 1989 and 11 March 1989	Tamil Nadu	President's Rule		Dravida Munnetra Kazhagam	M. Karunanidhi	
22 November 1989	Andhra Pradesh	Telugu Desam Party	N. T. Rama Rao	Indian National Congress	Marri Chenna Reddy	
22 November 1989	Goa	Indian National Congress	Pratapsingh Rane	Indian National Congress	Pratapsingh Rane	
22 November 1989	Karnataka	President's Rule		Indian National Congress	Veerendra Patil	
22 November 1989	Mizoram	President's Rule		Indian National Congress	Lal Thanhawla	
22 November 1989	Nagaland	President's Rule		Indian National Congress	S. C. Jamir	
22 November 1989	Uttar Pradesh	Indian National Congress	Narayan Dutt Tiwari	Janata Dal	Mulayam Singh Yadav	
26 November 1989	Sikkim	Sikkim Sangram Parishad	Nar Bahadur Bhandari	Sikkim Sangram Parishad	Nar Bahadur Bhandari	

== Legislative Assembly elections ==
=== Andhra Pradesh ===
No	Party	Seats Contested	Seats Won	Seats change	Vote Share	Swing
1	Indian National Congress	287	181	+131	47.09%	+3.67%
2	Telugu Desam Party	241	74	-128	36.54%	-9.67%
3	Communist Party of India	19	8	-3	2.31%	-0.05%
4	Communist Party of India (Marxist)	15	6	-5	2.46%	+0.15%
5	Bharatiya Janata Party	12	5	-3	1.78%	+0.46%
6	Janata Dal	4	1	+1	0.37%	+0.37%
7	All India Majlis-e-Ittehadul Muslimeen	35	4	+4	1.99	+1.99%
8	Independent (politician)		15	+6	6.58%	-2.52%

=== Goa ===
Party	Votes	%	Seats
Indian National Congress	204,321	40.52	20
Maharashtrawadi Gomantak Party	195,533	38.78	18
Gomantak Lok Party	15,894	3.15	0
Janata Dal	7,045	1.40	0
Shiv Sena	4,960	0.98	0
Communist Party of India	2,882	0.57	0
Bhartiya Janata Party	1,985	0.39	0
Gomantak Bahujan Samaj Parishad	896	0.18	0
Janata Party	246	0.05	0
Communist Party of India (Marxist)	105	0.02	0
Independents	70,338	13.95	2
Total	504,205	100.00	40
Valid votes	504,205	97.64	
Invalid/blank votes	12,207	2.36	
Total votes	516,412	100.00	
Registered voters/turnout	712,562	72.47	
Source: ECI

=== Karnataka ===
Summary of results of the Karnataka Legislative Assembly election, 1989
Political Party	Seats contested	Seats won	Number of Votes	% of Votes	Seat change
Indian National Congress	221	178	7,990,142	43.76%	▲113
Janata Dal	209	24	4,943,854	27.08%	New Party
Bharatiya Janata Party	118	4	755,032	4.14%	▲2
Janata Party (JP)	217	2	2,070,341	11.34%	▼137
Karnataka Rajya Raitha Sangha	105	2	654,801	3.59%	New Party
AIADMK	1	1	32,928	0.18%	▲1
Muslim League	13	1	80,612	0.44%	New Party
Independents	1088	12	1,482,482	8.12%	▼1
Total	2043	224	18,257,909		

=== Mizoram ===
Party	Votes	%	Seats	+/–
Indian National Congress	93,561	34.85	23	▲10
Mizo National Front	94,763	35.29	14	▼10
Mizoram People's Conference	52,813	19.67	1	▼2
Independents	27,353	10.19	2	▲2
Total	268,490	100.00	40	0
Valid votes	268,490	98.95		
Invalid/blank votes	2,849	1.05		
Total votes	271,339	100.00		
Registered voters/turnout	333,733	81.30		
Source: ECI

=== Nagaland ===
Party	Votes	%	Seats	+/–
Indian National Congress	253,792	51.45	36	+2
Nagaland People's Conference	205,283	41.61	24	New
National People's Party	13,596	2.76	0	New
Independents	20,625	4.18	0	–7
Total	493,296	100.00	60	0
Valid votes	493,296	98.89		
Invalid/blank votes	5,526	1.11		
Total votes	498,822	100.00		
Registered voters/turnout	582,416	85.65		
Source: ECI

=== Sikkim ===
Party	Votes	%	Seats	+/–
Sikkim Sangram Parishad	94,078	70.41	32	+2
Indian National Congress	24,121	18.05	0	–1
Rising Sun Party	11,472	8.59	0	New
Denzong Peoples Chogpi	298	0.22	0	New
Independents	3,650	2.73	0	–1
Total	133,619	100.00	32	0
Valid votes	133,619	95.97		
Invalid/blank votes	5,608	4.03		
Total votes	139,227	100.00		
Registered voters/turnout	192,619	72.28		
Source: ECI

=== Tamil Nadu ===
Summary of the 1989 January/March Tamil Nadu Legislative Assembly election results
Alliance/Party	Seats won	Change	Popular Vote	Vote %	Adj. %^{‡}
DMK+ alliance	169	+137	9,135,220	37.9%	
DMK	150	+126	8,001,222	33.2%	38.7%
CPI(M)	15	+10	851,351	3.5%	36.5%
JNP	4	+1	282,647	1.2%	29.1%
AIADMK+ alliance	34	-100	7,757,452	32.2%	
AIADMK(J)	27	-101	5,098,687	22.2%	25.0%
AIADMK(JA)	2	-101	2,214,965	9.2%	12.2%
AIADMK(United)	2	-101	148,630	0.6%	37.4%
CPI	3	+1	295,170	1.2%	21.3%
Others	31	-37	7,218,796	29.9%	
INC	26	-37	4,780,714	19.8%	21.8%
IND	5	+1	2,164,484	9.0%	9.1%
Total	234	–	24,111,468	100%	–

†: Seat change reflects 33 MLAs that supported Jayalalithaa faction and 97 MLAs that supported Janaki faction (2 MLAs that supported her had their constituency election in a later March by-election after the merge). It also reflects GKC merging with INC and AKD not winning a seat after winning a seat in 1984.
‡: Vote % reflects the percentage of votes the party received compared to the entire electorate that voted in this election. Adjusted (Adj.) Vote %, reflects the % of votes the party received per constituency that they contested.
Sources: Election Commission of India

=== Uttar Pradesh ===
Party	Votes	%	Seats	+/–
Janata Dal	11,571,462	29.71	208	New
Indian National Congress	10,866,428	27.90	94	–175
Bharatiya Janata Party	4,522,867	11.61	57	+41
Bahujan Samaj Party	3,664,417	9.41	13	+13
Communist Party of India	606,885	1.56	6	0
Lok Dal (B)	464,555	1.19	2	New
Janata Party (JP)	289,154	0.74	1	New
Communist Party of India (Marxist)	142,763	0.37	2	0
Shoshit Samaj Dal	71,763	0.18	1	New
Akhil Bharatiya Hindu Mahasabha	68,943	0.18	1	+1
Other Parties	655,972	1.68	0	–
Independents	6,020,921	15.46	40	+17
Total	38,946,130	100.00	425	0
Valid votes	38,946,130	95.18		
Invalid/blank votes	1,971,832	4.82		
Total votes	40,917,962	100.00		
Registered voters/turnout	79,560,897	51.43		
Source: ECI
