= Hospet Assembly constituency =

Former Assembly constituency in Karnataka, India

Coordinates: 18.018162°N 77.010178°E

Hospet
- Former constituency for the Karnataka Legislative Assembly

Constituency details
- Country: India
- Region: South India
- State: Karnataka
- Division: Gulbarga
- District: Ballari
- Lok Sabha constituency: Bellary
- Established: 1951
- Abolished: 2008

Hospet Assembly constituency was one of the constituencies in Karnataka state assembly in India until 2008 when it was made defunct. It was part of Bellary Lok Sabha constituency.

== Members of the Legislative Assembly ==
Election	Member	Party
1952	R. Nagana Gowda	Indian National Congress
1957	R. Nagana Gowda	Indian National Congress
1962	Murari Kamala. M. Sreeramulu	Praja Socialist Party
1967	R. Nagana Gowda	Indian National Congress
1970 By-election (Note: Died on 19/07/1969)	S. Singh . B	NCJ
1972	N. Chikkegowda	Indian National Congress
1978	K. Gudusaheb	Indian National Congress
1983	G. Shankar Goud	Indian National Congress
1985	Bheemaneni Kondaiah	Janata Party
1989	Gujjala Hanumanthappa	Janata Dal
1991 By-election (Note: Death of Gujjala Hanumanthappa)	R. Singh	Indian National Congress
1994	G. Shankar Goud	Bharatiya Janata Party
1999	Jayalakshmi Gujjal	Indian National Congress
2004	H. R. Gaviyappa	Independent politician

== Election results ==
=== Assembly Election 2004 ===
2004 Karnataka Legislative Assembly election : Hospet
Party	Candidate	Votes	%	±%
Independent	H. R. Gaviyappa	31,440	28.15%	New
BJP	G. Shankar Goud	23,737	21.25%	▼17.07
INC	Hanumanthappa. G. K	21,068	18.86%	▼31.38
Independent	Rajarao. G	20,459	18.32%	New
JD(S)	Ayyali Thimappa	7,731	6.92%	▲5.46
Kannada Nadu Party	Bhavikatti Basanna	2,692	2.41%	New
Independent	Sheela. T. S	1,813	1.62%	New
Pyramid Party of India	Rudrareddy. G	1,540	1.38%	▲0.49
BSP	Chandramouli. E	1,213	1.09%	New
Margin of victory		7,703	6.90%	▼5.02
Turnout		111,733	58.49%	▲0.46
Total valid votes		111,693		
Registered electors		191,021		▲9.24
Independent gain from INC		Swing	▼22.09	

=== Assembly Election 1999 ===
1999 Karnataka Legislative Assembly election : Hospet
Party	Candidate	Votes	%	±%
INC	Jayalakshmi Gujjal	47,220	50.24%	▲20.37
BJP	G. Shankar Goud	36,015	38.32%	▼9.74
CPI(M)	S. Prasannakumar	4,103	4.37%	New
Independent	Kaviraju	2,977	3.17%	New
JD(S)	V. Venkateshwara Reddy	1,371	1.46%	New
Independent	B. Showkath Ali	1,102	1.17%	New
Pyramid Party of India	Daki Reddy. K	836	0.89%	New
Margin of victory		11,205	11.92%	▼6.27
Turnout		101,481	58.03%	▼5.36
Total valid votes		93,996		
Rejected ballots		7,485	7.38%	▲4.51
Registered electors		174,870		▲7.24
INC gain from BJP		Swing	▲2.18	

=== Assembly Election 1994 ===
1994 Karnataka Legislative Assembly election : Hospet
Party	Candidate	Votes	%	±%
BJP	G. Shankar Goud	48,249	48.06%	New
INC	H. Abdul Wahab	29,988	29.87%	▼6.06
JD	Bheemaneni Kondaiah	18,281	18.21%	New
INC	Ambika Jalagar	1,677	1.67%	New
KRRS	Maharaj Durgappa	693	0.69%	New
Margin of victory		18,261	18.19%	▲17.61
Turnout		103,365	63.39%	
Total valid votes		100,401		
Rejected ballots		2,964	2.87%	
Registered electors		163,057		
BJP gain from INC		Swing	▲12.13	

=== Assembly By-election 1991 ===
1991 Karnataka Legislative Assembly by-election : Hospet
Party	Candidate	Votes	%	±%
INC	R. Singh	27,021	35.93%	▲4.33
Independent	S. Gouda	26,588	35.35%	New
Independent	G. Bhrappa	18,908	25.14%	New
Independent	C. H. Lingappa	907	1.21%	New
Independent	M. Apparao	793	1.05%	New
Independent	K. Niyaji	525	0.70%	New
Margin of victory		433	0.58%	▼31.62
Total valid votes		75,212		
INC gain from JD		Swing	▼27.87	

=== Assembly Election 1989 ===
1989 Karnataka Legislative Assembly election : Hospet
Party	Candidate	Votes	%	±%
JD	Gujjala Hanumanthappa	63,805	63.80%	New
INC	H. Abdul Wahab	31,603	31.60%	▼5.89
JP	Ko. Kotreswara	2,841	2.84%	New
Independent	Dhanavelu	641	0.64%	New
Margin of victory		32,202	32.20%	▲7.18
Turnout		106,278	65.19%	▲5.05
Total valid votes		100,006		
Rejected ballots		6,272	5.90%	▲3.72
Registered electors		163,029		▲30.98
JD gain from JP		Swing	▲1.29	

=== Assembly Election 1985 ===
1985 Karnataka Legislative Assembly election : Hospet
Party	Candidate	Votes	%	±%
JP	Bheemaneni Kondaiah	45,777	62.51%	▲38.42
INC	G. Shankar Goud	27,452	37.49%	▼5.39
Margin of victory		18,325	25.02%	▲11.69
Turnout		74,859	60.14%	▼3.90
Total valid votes		73,229		
Rejected ballots		1,630	2.18%	▼1.80
Registered electors		124,465		▲10.97
JP gain from INC		Swing	▲19.63	

=== Assembly Election 1983 ===
1983 Karnataka Legislative Assembly election : Hospet
Party	Candidate	Votes	%	±%
INC	G. Shankar Goud	29,572	42.88%	▲40.78
Independent	Gujjala Hanumanthappa	20,381	29.55%	New
JP	B. Kondaiah	16,611	24.09%	▼17.30
BJP	J. G. Gadigeppa	2,145	3.11%	New
Margin of victory		9,191	13.33%	▲0.80
Turnout		71,826	64.04%	▼2.04
Total valid votes		68,965		
Rejected ballots		2,861	3.98%	▲0.20
Registered electors		112,162		▲10.33
INC gain from INC(I)		Swing	▼11.04	

=== Assembly Election 1978 ===
1978 Karnataka Legislative Assembly election : Hospet
Party	Candidate	Votes	%	±%
INC(I)	K. Gudusaheb	34,855	53.92%	New
JP	G. Shankar Goud	26,754	41.39%	New
INC	B. Rangappa	1,357	2.10%	▼145.25
Independent	N. Thimma Reddy	794	1.23%	New
Independent	M. Ratnavelu	738	1.14%	New
Margin of victory		8,101	12.53%	▼17.21
Turnout		67,178	66.08%	▲10.70
Total valid votes		64,641		
Rejected ballots		2,537	3.78%	▲3.78
Registered electors		101,659		▲19.14
INC(I) gain from INC		Swing	▼34.62	

=== Assembly Election 1972 ===
1972 Mysore State Legislative Assembly election : Hospet
Party	Candidate	Votes	%	±%
INC	N. Chikkegowda	40,227	80.22%	New
INC	B. Satyanarayana Singh	26,717	53.28%	New
INC(O)	G. Shankar Goud	17,305	34.51%	New
INC(O)	T. Kembarai	6,937	13.83%	New
SSP	S. N. Thabasappa	2,351	4.69%	New
SSP	A. C. Dasan Solomon	725	1.45%	New
Independent	Korisetty Jambanna	685	1.37%	New
ABJS	K. S. Rama Rao	401	0.80%	New
Margin of victory		13,510	26.94%	▲3.51
Turnout		51,134	68.53%	
Total valid votes		50,146		
Registered electors		74,612		
INC gain from NCJ		Swing	▲18.51	

=== Assembly By-election 1970 ===
1970 Mysore State Legislative Assembly by-election : Hospet
Party	Candidate	Votes	%	±%
NCJ	S. Singh . B	28,218	61.71%	New
NCN	B. Setty. P	17,506	38.29%	New
Margin of victory		10,712	23.43%	▲2.87
Total valid votes		45,724		
NCJ gain from INC		Swing	▲3.65	

=== Assembly Election 1967 ===
1967 Mysore State Legislative Assembly election : Hospet
Party	Candidate	Votes	%	±%
INC	R. Nagana Gowda	19,718	58.06%	▲25.00
Independent	P. Naglingaiah	12,736	37.50%	New
Independent	K. J. Ambanna	1,510	4.45%	New
Margin of victory		6,982	20.56%	▼11.33
Turnout		36,544	54.08%	▼18.46
Total valid votes		33,964		
Registered electors		67,576		▲35.15
INC gain from PSP		Swing	▼6.89	

=== Assembly Election 1962 ===
1962 Mysore State Legislative Assembly election : Hospet
Party	Candidate	Votes	%	±%
PSP	Murari Kamala. M. Sreeramulu	21,913	64.95%	New
INC	R. Nagana Gowda	11,153	33.06%	▼20.63
Independent	Korisetty Jambanna	674	2.00%	New
Margin of victory		10,760	31.89%	▲24.51
Turnout		36,273	72.54%	▲3.44
Total valid votes		33,740		
Registered electors		50,001		▲18.49
PSP gain from INC		Swing	▲11.26	

=== Assembly Election 1957 ===
1957 Mysore State Legislative Assembly election : Hospet
Party	Candidate	Votes	%	±%
INC	R. Nagana Gowda	15,656	53.69%	▼8.64
Independent	Murarai Venkataswamy	13,505	46.31%	New
Margin of victory		2,151	7.38%	▼30.46
Turnout		29,161	69.10%	▲9.91
Total valid votes		29,161		
Registered electors		42,199		▼40.89
INC hold		Swing	▼8.64	

=== Assembly Election 1952 ===
1952 Madras State Legislative Assembly election : Hospet
Party	Candidate	Votes	%	±%
INC	R. Nagana Gowda	26,339	62.33%	New
Independent	Mahabaleswarappa	10,349	24.49%	New
Independent	Jambayya Banada	3,768	8.92%	New
Socialist Party (India)	A. Thirumala Rao	1,801	4.26%	New
Margin of victory		15,990	37.84%	
Turnout		42,257	59.19%	
Total valid votes		42,257		
Registered electors		71,387		
INC win (new seat)				

== See also ==
- List of constituencies of the Karnataka Legislative Assembly
