= Kaman Assembly constituency =

Legislative Assembly constituency in Rajasthan State, India

Coordinates: 27.65°N 77.27°E

Kaman
- Constituency No. 70 for the Rajasthan Legislative Assembly

Constituency details
- Country: India
- Region: North India
- State: Rajasthan
- District: Bharatpur
- Lok Sabha constituency: Bharatpur
- Established: 1962
- Total electors: 265,803
- Reservation: None

Member of Legislative Assembly
- 16th Rajasthan Legislative Assembly
- Incumbent Nauksham Chaudhary
- Party: Bharatiya Janata Party
- Elected year: 2023
- Preceded by: Zahida Khan

Kaman Assembly constituency is one of the 200 Legislative Assembly constituencies of Rajasthan state in India. It is part of Bharatpur district. The Tayyab Hussain clan, originally from Haryana, holds the record for the highest number of successful election wins to the Assembly seat.

== Member of the Legislative Assembly ==
Year	Member	Party
1962	Majlis	Indian National Congress
1967	Majlis	Indian National Congress
1972	Manohar Lal	Bharatiya Jana Sangh
1977	Mohammed Jahoor	Janata Party
1980	Chau Khan	Janata Party
1985	Shamshul Hasan	Indian National Congress
1990	Madan Mohan Singhal	Independent politician
1993	Tayyab Husain	Indian National Congress
1998	Tayyab Husain	Indian National Congress
2003	Madan Mohan Singhal	Bharatiya Janata Party
2008	Zahida Khan	Indian National Congress
2013	Ku. Jagat Singh	Bharatiya Janata Party
2018	Zahida Khan	Indian National Congress
2023	Nauksham Chaudhary	Bharatiya Janata Party

== Election results ==
=== 2023 ===
Rajasthan Legislative Assembly Election, 2023: Kaman
Party	Candidate	Votes	%	±%
BJP	Nauksham Chaudhary	78,646	37.81	+0.53
Independent	Mukhtyar Ahmad	64,740	31.13	
INC	Zahida Khan	58,130	27.95	−30.09
NOTA	None of the above	1,076	0.52	−0.07
Majority		13,906	6.68	−14.08
Turnout		207,982	78.25	−3.5
BJP gain from INC		Swing		

=== 2018 ===
Rajasthan Legislative Assembly Election, 2018: Kaman
Party	Candidate	Votes	%	±%
INC	Zahida Khan	110,789	58.04	
BJP	Jawahar Singh Beadham	71,168	37.28	
BSP	Ishwari Dayal	3,808	1.99	
Independent	Maksood Khan	1,907	1.0	
NOTA	None of the above	1,127	0.59	
Majority		39,621	20.76	
Turnout		190,878	81.75	
INC gain from BJP		Swing		

== See also ==
- List of constituencies of the Rajasthan Legislative Assembly
- Bharatpur district
