= Ram Puniyani =

Indian academic and activist (born 1945)

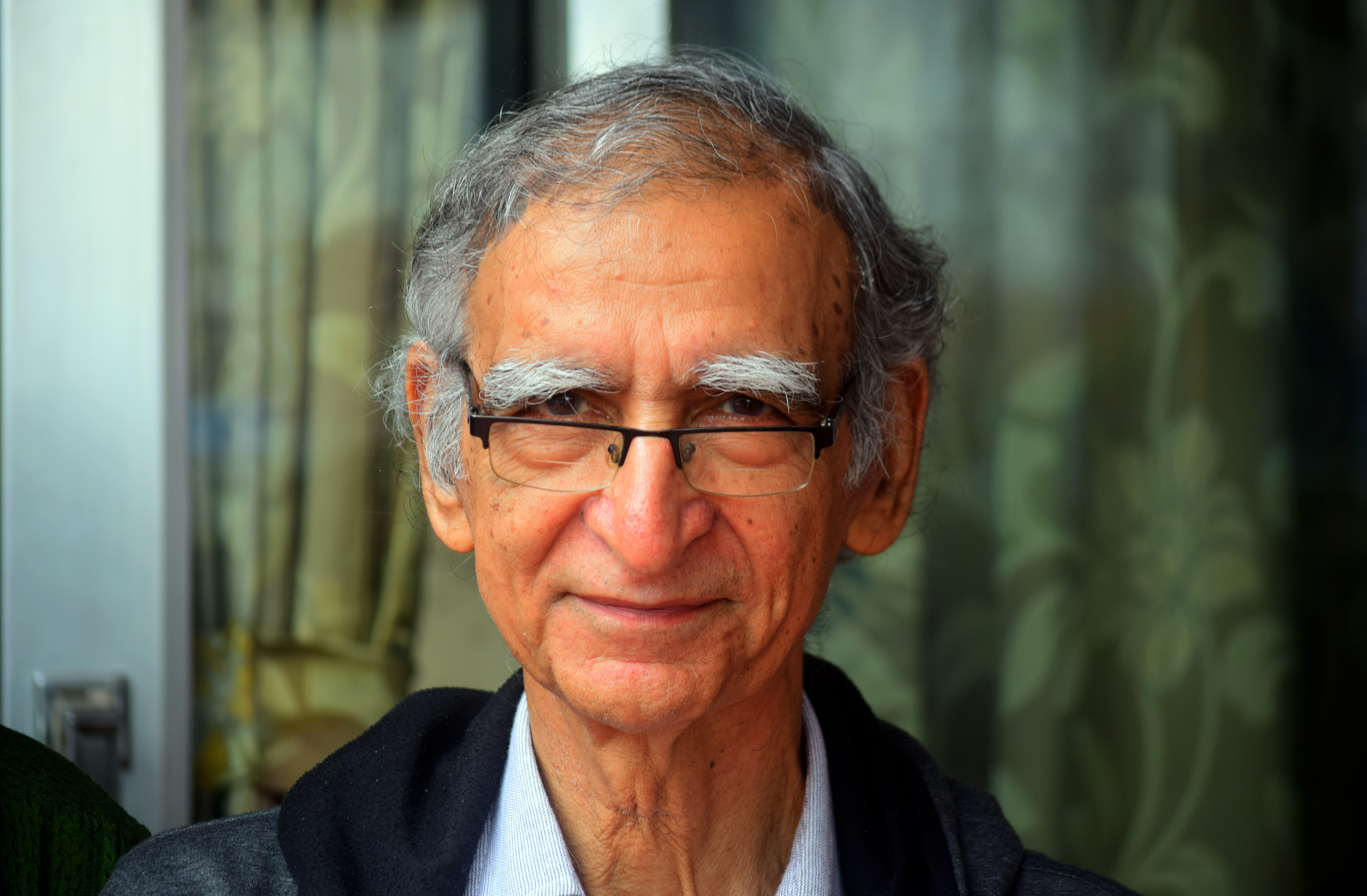
- Born: 25 August 1945 (age 81)
- Occupations: Writer; volunteer; public speaker; doctor; teacher; medical researcher
- Website: rampuniyani.in

Ram Puniyani (born 25 August 1945) is an Indian author and former professor of biomedical engineering. He worked at the Indian Institute of Technology Bombay as a senior medical officer. He began his medical career in 1973 and served at IIT in various capacities for 27 years, starting in 1977. He has been involved in human rights work and initiatives opposing Hindu fundamentalism in India. He is currently serving as the President of the Executive Council of the Centre for Study of Society and Secularism (CSSS). He is also an advisory board member of the Muslim Mirror.

== Activism ==
He has been associated with various secular initiatives and has participated in several investigations concerning human rights violations against minorities.

He also served on an Indian People's Tribunal that investigated the violation of the rights of minorities in the states of Odisha and Madhya Pradesh.

He gives seminars and workshops on topics such as communal politics, human rights, secularism and the Uniform Civil Code debate, the Partition of India, and the Kashmir conflict. His articles and essays regularly appear in various Indian magazines and newspapers.

He also runs a fortnightly e-bulletin, Issues in Secular Politics.

In March 2019, men in plain clothes, claiming to be from the CID, inquired about the whereabouts of his children.

In early June 2019, he reported receiving threatening phone calls from unknown individuals who demanded that he cease his activities and leave the country. After these incidents, Puniyani filed a report with the Mumbai Police.

== Awards ==
- Maharashtra Foundation (US) award for Social Awareness about the threat of Communal Politics (2002)
- National Communal Harmony Award (2007)
- NCHRO's Mukundan C.Menon award (2015)

== Works ==
- Clinical Hemorheology: New Horizons (New Age International, 1996), ISBN 9788122407754
- Applied Clinical Hemorheology (with Hideyuki Nimi, Quest Publications, 1998), ISBN 9788187099062
- The Other Cheek: Minorities under Threat (Media House, 2000), ISBN 9788174950819
- Second Assassination of Gandhi (University of Leicester, 2002), ISBN 9788174951489
- Communalism: What is False: What is True (with Khalid Azam, Bombay Sarvoda Friendship Center, 2002)
- Communal Politics: Facts Versus Myths (2003), ISBN 9780761996675
- Communalism: Illustrated Primer (Safdar Hashmi Memorial Trust and J&P Publications, 2004), ISBN 978-8186219324
- Hindu Extreme Right-Wing Groups : Ideology and Consequences (Media House, 2004), ISBN 9788174951731
- Fascism of Sangh Parivar (Media House, 2004), ISBN 9788174951953
- Religion, Power and Violence: Expression Of Politics In Contemporary Times, (SAGE, 2005), ISBN 9788132102069
- Contours of Hindu Rashtra: Hindutva, Sangh Parivar And Contemporary Politics (Kalpaz, 2006), ISBN 9788178354736
- Indian Democracy, Pluralism and Minorities (Global Media, 2006), ISBN 9788188869190
- The Politics behind Anti-Christian Violence (compilation of investigation committee reports, Media House, 2006), ISBN 9788174952370
- Terrorism: Facts versus Myths (Pharos Media, 2007), ISBN 978-81-7221-033-5
- Fundamentalism: Threat to Secular Democracy (eBook, IdeaIndia.com, 2007), ASIN B005D7FCYY
- Contemporary India: Overcoming Sectarianism: Terrorism (Hope India, 2008), ISBN 9788178711454
- Communalism: India's Nemesis? (eBook, IdeaIndia.com, 2009), ASIN B005INISXU
- Dalit and Social Justice (Mythri Books, 2009)
- Mumbai" Post 26/11 - An Alternative Perspective (with Shabnam Hashmi, SAGE, 2010), ISBN 9788132104926
- Deconstructing Communalism in India: Striving for Harmony (All India Secular Forum, 2010)
- Samajik Nyaya Ek Sachitra Parichay (in Hindi, Vani Prakashan, 2010), 9789350001479
- Communal Threat to Secular Democracy (Kalpaz, 2010), ISBN 978-8178358611
- Malegaon to Ajmer: The Trail of Terror (edited, All-India Secular Forum, 2010)
- Communalism Explained! A Graphic Account (with Sharad Sharma, Vani Prakashan, 2011)
- Making Sense of Ayodhya Verdict (co-edited with Dr. Asghar Ali Engineer, Vitasta Publishing, 2011), ISBN 9380828500.
- God Politics (Vitasta Pub, 2012), ISBN 9789380828633
- Sectarianism, Politics and Development (with Uday Mehta, Rawat, 2012), ISBN 9788131605233
- Muslims in Indian Democracy (Kalpaz, 2013), ISBN 9788178359281
- Quest for Social Justice: An Illustrated Primer (Arth Prakashan, 2013), ASIN B00J6AN412
- Tribute Volume For Dr. Asghar Ali Engineer Striving For Peace And Harmony (Bhashya Prakashan 2014), ISBN 978-9383206292
- Caste and Communalism (Mythri Books 2011), ASIN: B00HR1PB04
- Communalism & Anti Christian Violence (Mythri Books 2011), ASIN: B00HWWISMG
- Osama, America and Terrorism (Mythri Books 2012), ASIN: B00HWWIUP6
- Religion and Politics (Mythri Books 2009), ASIN: B00HWWMF7U
- Making of a Nation (Mythri Books 2012), ASIN: B00HWWMHWI
- Saampradaayiktaa (2011), ISBN 978-9350007419
- Aatankvaad Explained- A Graphics Account (Arth Prakashan 2013), ISBN 978-8192627632
- Mathaveri (Uyirmmai Pathippagam 2009) ISBN 978-9380072883
