= 1991 elections in India =

1991 Indian elections
- ← 1989 1990 1991 1992 1993 →
- Incumbent Prime Minister: P. V. Narasimha Rao
- Next Lok Sabha: 14th

Lok Sabha elections
- Seats contested: 543

Rajya Sabha elections
- Overall control: Indian National Congress
- Seats contested: TBD
- Net seat change: TBD

State elections
- States contested: 7
- Net state change: TBD

Elections in the Republic of India in 1991 included the general election, elections to seven state legislative assemblies and to seats in the Rajya Sabha.

== General Election ==
Party	Votes	%	Seats
Indian National Congress	99,799,403	36.26	232
Bharatiya Janata Party	55,345,075	20.11	120
Janata Dal	32,589,180	11.84	59
Communist Party of India (Marxist)	16,954,797	6.16	35
Janata Party	9,267,096	3.37	5
Telugu Desam Party	8,223,271	2.99	13
Communist Party of India	6,851,114	2.49	14
Dravida Munnetra Kazhagam	5,741,910	2.09	0
All India Anna Dravida Munnetra Kazhagam	4,470,542	1.62	11
Bahujan Samaj Party	4,420,719	1.61	2
Shiv Sena	2,208,712	0.80	4
Revolutionary Socialist Party	1,749,730	0.64	4
Asom Gana Parishad	1,489,898	0.54	1
Jharkhand Mukti Morcha	1,481,900	0.54	6
Janata Dal (Gujarat)	1,399,702	0.51	1
Pattali Makkal Katchi	1,283,065	0.47	0
All India Forward Bloc	1,145,015	0.42	3
Indian Congress (Socialist) – Sarat Chandra Sinha	982,954	0.36	1
Indian Union Muslim League	845,418	0.31	2
Indian Peoples Front	644,891	0.23	0
Natun Asom Gana Parishad	494,628	0.18	0
Karnataka Rajya Ryota Sangha	490,275	0.18	0
Doordarshi Party	466,869	0.17	0
All India Majlis-e-Ittehadul Muslimeen	456,900	0.17	1
Kerala Congress (M)	384,255	0.14	1
Jharkhand Party	350,699	0.13	0
Haryana Vikas Party	331,794	0.12	1
Nagaland People's Council	328,015	0.12	1
Bharatiya Republican Paksha	327,941	0.12	0
Kerala Congress	319,933	0.12	0
Peasants and Workers Party of India	295,402	0.11	0
United Minorities Front, Assam	206,737	0.08	0
Lokdal	173,884	0.06	0
Marxist Co-ordination Committee	171,767	0.06	0
United Reservation Movement Council of Assam	170,376	0.06	0
Manipur Peoples Party	169,692	0.06	1
Autonomous State Demand Committee	139,785	0.05	1
Sanjukta Loka Parishad	125,738	0.05	0
Sikkim Sangram Parishad	106,247	0.04	1
Republican Party of India (Khobragade)	91,557	0.03	0
Shiromani Akali Dal (Simaranjit Singh Mann)	88,084	0.03	0
Plain Tribals Council of Assam	87,387	0.03	0
Mizo National Front	82,019	0.03	0
Sarv Jati Janata Parishad	70,368	0.03	0
Akhil Bharat Hindu Mahasabha	67,495	0.02	0
Maharashtrawadi Gomantak Party	64,752	0.02	0
Tharasu Makkal Mandram	55,165	0.02	0
Uttarakhand Kranti Dal	47,369	0.02	0
Marxist Communist Party of India (S.S. Srivastava)	43,085	0.02	0
Bharatiya Krishi Udyog Sangh	42,504	0.02	0
Jan Parishad	37,725	0.01	0
Republican Party of India	36,541	0.01	0
Amra Bangali	35,186	0.01	0
Indian Union Muslim League (IML)	31,387	0.01	0
Sampooran Kranti Das	29,647	0.01	0
Akhil Bharatiya Manav Seva Das	28,528	0.01	0
Uttar Pradesh Republican Party	28,379	0.01	0
Yuva Vikas Party	28,159	0.01	0
Communist Party of India (Marxist–Leninist)	27,730	0.01	0
Jawan Kisan Mazdoor Party	23,929	0.01	0
Proutist Bloc of India	22,734	0.01	0
Soshit Samaj Dal	19,925	0.01	0
Akhil Bharatiya Jansangh	19,243	0.01	0
Orissa Vikas Parishad	15,893	0.01	0
Hul Jharkhand Party	15,406	0.01	0
Socialist Party of India (Lohia)	12,928	0.00	0
Akhil Bharatiya Hindustani Krantikari Samajwadi Party	12,820	0.00	0
Dalit Panthers Party	11,967	0.00	0
Bharatiya Loktantrik Mazdoor Dal	10,837	0.00	0
Akhil Bharatiya Revolutionary Samaj Dal	8,825	0.00	0
Akhil Bhartiya Shivsena-Rashtrawadi	8,810	0.00	0
Asom Jatiyatabadi Dal	8,519	0.00	0
Ambedkar Makkal Iyakkam	8,252	0.00	0
Asom Jatiya Parishad	8,047	0.00	0
Socialist Party (Ramakant Pandey)	7,104	0.00	0
Akhil Bharatiya Pichhadavarg Party	6,897	0.00	0
All India Dalit Muslim Minorities Suraksha Mahasangh	5,888	0.00	0
Vidarbha Praja Party	5,597	0.00	0
Akhil Bharatiya Gram Parishad	5,521	0.00	0
Akhil Bhartiya Dharmnirpeksh Dal	5,436	0.00	0
Hindu Swaraj Sangathan	5,325	0.00	0
Republican Presidium Party of India	4,967	0.00	0
Surajya Party	4,705	0.00	0
Sarvodaya Party	4,642	0.00	0
Janata Dal (Samajwadi)	4,548	0.00	0
Deseeya Karshaka Party	4,508	0.00	0
Gondwana Party	3,605	0.00	0
Azad Hind Fauz (Rajkiya)	3,543	0.00	0
Samdarshi Party	2,921	0.00	0
Lok Party	2,873	0.00	0
Socialist League of India	2,852	0.00	0
All India Urdu Morcha	2,655	0.00	0
Akhil Bhartiya Ramrajya Parishad (Vasudev Shastri Atul)	2,519	0.00	0
All India Kisan Mazdoor Sabha	2,311	0.00	0
Pondicherry Mannila Makkal Munnani	2,259	0.00	0
Pandav Dal	2,213	0.00	0
Internationalist Democratic Party	2,078	0.00	0
Gomant Lok Party	1,983	0.00	0
Akhil Bharatiya Desh Bhakt Morcha	1,792	0.00	0
Workers Party of India	1,781	0.00	0
Nationalist Party	1,768	0.00	0
Marx Engles Leninist Commune Health Association	1,692	0.00	0
Nagaland Peoples Party	1,572	0.00	0
Adarsh Lok Dal	1,544	0.00	0
Desh Bhakt Party	1,521	0.00	0
Akhil Bharatiya Bharat Desham Party	1,466	0.00	0
Republican Party of India (Kamble)	1,300	0.00	0
Akhil Bharatiya Janhit Jagrati Party	1,245	0.00	0
Mukt Bharat	1,191	0.00	0
Rashtriya Krantikari Dal	1,125	0.00	0
Sampooran Rashtriya Sena	1,040	0.00	0
Gramma Munnetra Kazhagam	1,030	0.00	0
Navbharat Party	787	0.00	0
Labour Party of India (V.V. Prasad)	684	0.00	0
Thayaga Marumalrchi Kazhagam	665	0.00	0
Poorvanchal Rashtriya Congress	605	0.00	0
Jammu-Kashmir Panthers Party	587	0.00	0
Kannada Paksha	576	0.00	0
Akhil Bharatiya Mahila Dal	573	0.00	0
Socialist Revolutionary Party	571	0.00	0
Lokhit Morcha	532	0.00	0
Republican Party of India (Athawale)	521	0.00	0
Labour Party (Ashok Bhattacharjee)	434	0.00	0
Akhil Bharatiya Loktantra Party	408	0.00	0
Cheluva Kannad Nadu	383	0.00	0
Azad Party	372	0.00	0
Democratic Party of India	359	0.00	0
Bharatiya Backward Party	329	0.00	0
Hindu Shiv Sena (A.K. Brahmbatt)	325	0.00	0
Rashtriya Unnatsheel Das	316	0.00	0
Akhil Bharatiya Gram Parishad	314	0.00	0
Akhil Bharatiya Loktantric Alpsankhyak Janmorcha	257	0.00	0
Sr. Citizens National Party of India	250	0.00	0
Socialist Labour League	246	0.00	0
M.G.R. Munnetra Kazhagam	228	0.00	0
Mahabharat People's Party	225	0.00	0
Janata Congress Party of Bharatvarsha	194	0.00	0
Akhil Bhartiya Hindu Shakti Dal	193	0.00	0
Akhil Bharatiya Socialist Party	166	0.00	0
Kannada Desh Party	164	0.00	0
Bharatiya Dhruba Labour Party	142	0.00	0
Jai Mahakali Nigrani Samiti	138	0.00	0
Bhartiya Sangthit Nagrik Party	120	0.00	0
Vishal Bharat Party	56	0.00	0
Jan Ekata Morcha	34	0.00	0
Independents	11,441,688	4.16	1
Nominated Anglo-Indians			2
Total	275,206,990	100.00	523
Valid votes	275,206,990	97.35	
Invalid/blank votes	7,493,952	2.65	
Total votes	282,700,942	100.00	
Registered voters/turnout	498,363,801	56.73	

== Results ==
Date(s)	State	Government before election	Chief Minister before election	Government after election	Chief Minister after election	Maps
24 April 1991	West Bengal	Communist Party of India (Marxist)	Jyoti Basu	Communist Party of India (Marxist)	Jyoti Basu	
6 to 8 June 1991	Assam	President's Rule		Indian National Congress	Hiteswar Saikia	
15 June 1991	Pondicherry	President's Rule		Indian National Congress	V. Vaithilingam	
15 June 1991	Tamil Nadu	President's Rule		All India Anna Dravida Munnetra Kazhagam	J. Jayalalithaa	
18 June 1991	Kerala	Communist Party of India (Marxist)	E. K. Nayanar	Indian National Congress	K. Karunakaran	
June 1991	Haryana	President's Rule		Indian National Congress	Bhajan Lal Bishnoi	
June 1991	Uttar Pradesh	President's Rule		Bhartiya Janata Party	Kalyan Singh	

== Legislative Assembly elections ==
=== Assam ===
Party	Votes	%	Seats	+/–
Indian National Congress	2,455,302	29.35	66	▲41
Asom Gana Parishad	1,499,911	17.93	19	New
Bharatiya Janata Party	548,271	6.55	10	New
Natun Asom Gana Parishad	456,209	5.45	5	New
Janata Dal	398,623	4.77	1	New
Communist Party of India (Marxist)	321,926	3.85	2	0
Communist Party of India	206,541	2.47	4	▲4
Autonomous State Demand Committee	133,280	1.59	4	New
Others	553,683	6.62	0	0
Independents	1,791,086	21.41	15	▼77
Total	8,364,832	100.00	126	0
Valid votes	8,364,832	94.33		
Invalid/blank votes	502,807	5.67		
Total votes	8,867,639	100.00		
Registered voters/turnout	11,892,170	74.57		
Source: ECI

=== Haryana ===
Summary of results of the Haryana Legislative Assembly election, 1991
Political Party	No. of candidates	No. of elected	Number of Votes	% of Votes
Indian National Congress	90	51	2,084,856	33.73%
Janata Party	88	16	1,361,955	22.03%
Haryana Vikas Party	61	12	775,375	12.54%
Janata Dal	25	3	277,380	4.49%
Bharatiya Janata Party	89	2	582,850	9.43%
Bahujan Samaj Party	26	1	143,611	2.32%
Independents	1412	5	848,527	13.73%
Total	1885	90	6,181,187	

=== Kerala ===
Party Wise Results
Party	Seats
Communist Party of India (CPI)	12
Communist Party of Indian (Marxist) (CPM)	28
Indian Congress (Socialist-Sarat Chandra Sinha) ICS(SCS)	2
Indian National Congress (INC)	55
Janta Dal (JD)	3
Kerala Congress (M) (KCM)	10
Kerala Congress (KEC)	1
Muslim League (MUL)	19
Revolutionary Socialist Party (RSP)	2
Communist Party of India (Marxist) CPI(M)	1
Communist Marxist Party of India (CPM)(K)	1
National Democratic Party (NDP)	2
Independent (IND)	4
Total	140

=== Pondicherry ===
Party	Votes	%	Seats	+/–
Indian National Congress	117,289	30.00	15	▲4
Dravida Munnetra Kazhagam	96,607	24.71	4	▼5
All India Anna Dravida Munnetra Kazhagam	67,792	17.34	6	▲3
Janata Dal	26,321	6.73	1	▼3
Communist Party of India	19,503	4.99	1	▼1
Others	27,678	7.08	0	0
Independents	35,739	9.14	3	▲2
Total	390,929	100.00	30	0
Valid votes	390,929	97.29		
Invalid/blank votes	10,895	2.71		
Total votes	401,824	100.00		
Registered voters/turnout	593,318	67.72		
Source: ECI

=== Tamil Nadu ===
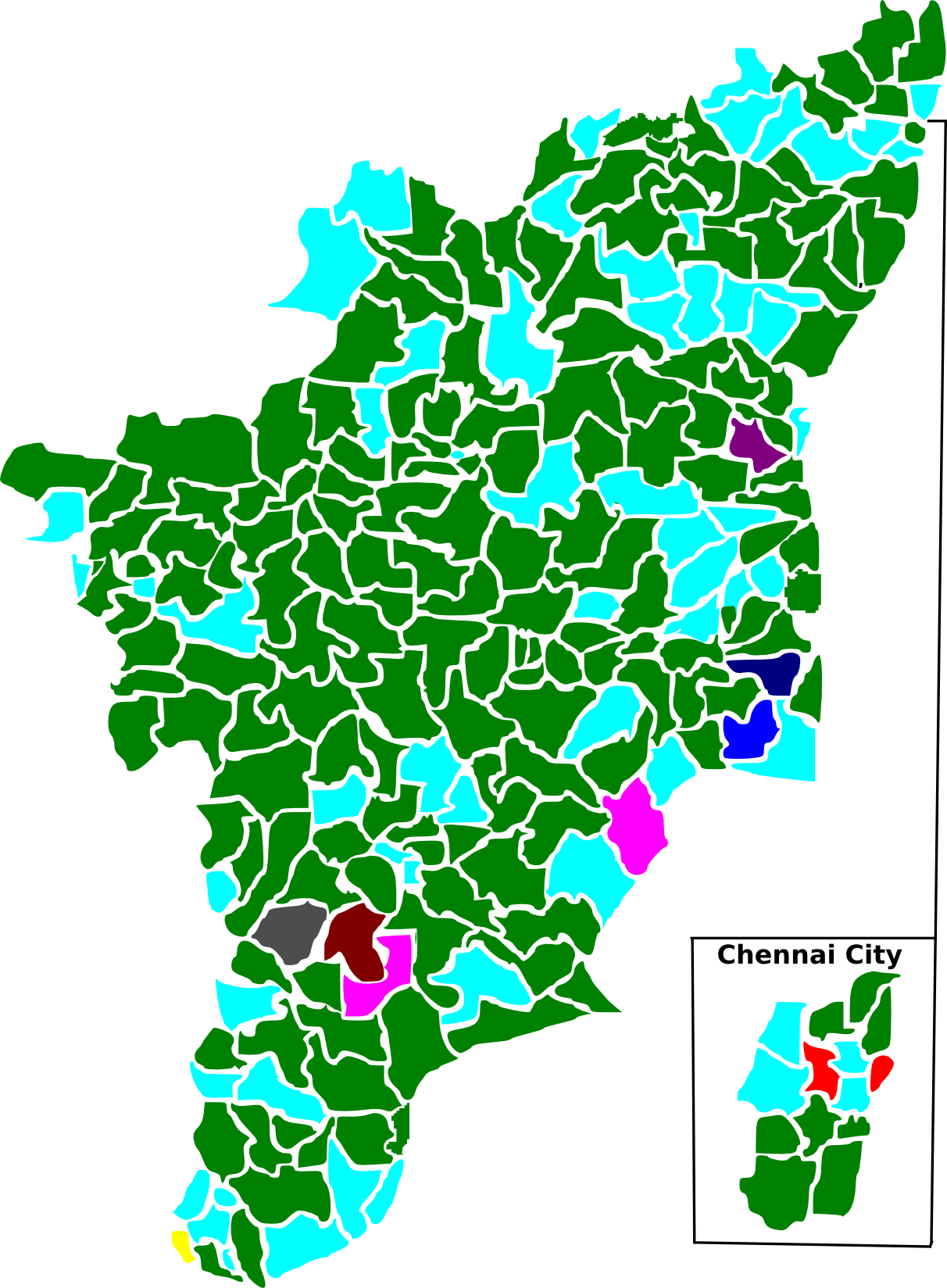
Election map of results based on parties. Colours are based on the results table on the left

Summary of the 1991 May 1991 Tamil Nadu Legislative Assembly election results
Alliance/Party	Seats won	Change	Popular Vote	Vote %	Adj. %^{‡}
AIADMK+ alliance	225	+172	14,738,042	59.8%	
AIADMK	164	+137	10,940,966	44.4%	61.1%
INC	60	+34	3,743,859	15.2%	56.2%
ICS(SCS)^{†}	1	+1	53,217	0.2%	56.1%
DMK+ alliance	7	-164	7,405,935	30.0%	
DMK	2	-148	5,535,668	22.5%	29.9%
TMK	2	-1	371,645	1.5%	31.0%
CPI(M)	1	-14	777,532	3.2%	31.2%
JD	1	+1	415,947	1.7%	28.3%
CPI	1	-2	305,143	1.2%	29.9%
Others	2	-8	2,505,431	10.2%	
PMK	1	+1	1,452,982	5.9%	7.0%
JP	0	-4	51,564	0.2%	0.7%
IND	1	-5	390,227	1.6%	1.7%
Total	234	–	24,649,408	100%	–

†: ICS(SCS) contested in 13 different constituencies, but only the one contested by Sanjay Ramaswamy was endorsed by AIADMK.
‡: Vote % reflects the percentage of votes the party received compared to the entire electorate that voted in this election. Adjusted (Adj.) Vote %, reflects the % of votes the party received per constituency that they contested.
Sources: Election Commission of India

=== Uttar Pradesh ===
Party name	Seats
Bharatiya Janata Party (BJP)	221
Bahujan Samaj Party (BSP)	12
Communist Party of India (CPI)	4
Communist Party of India (Marxist) (CPM)	1
Indian National Congress (INC)	46
Janata Dal (JD)	92
Janata Party (JP)	34
Shiv Sena (SHS)	1
Shoshit Samaj Dal (SSD)	1
Independents	7
Total	419

=== West Bengal ===
Party		Candidates	Seats	Votes	%
Left Front & allies	Communist Party of India (Marxist)	204	182	10,954,379	35.37
Left Front & allies	All India Forward Bloc	34	29	1,707,676	5.51
Left Front & allies	Revolutionary Socialist Party	23	18	1,073,445	3.47
Left Front & allies	Communist Party of India	12	6	542,964	1.75
Left Front & allies	West Bengal Socialist Party	4	4	208,147	0.67
Left Front & allies	Marxist Forward Bloc	2	2	130,454	0.42
Left Front & allies	Democratic Socialist Party (Prabodh Chandra)	2	2	98,905	0.39
Left Front & allies	Revolutionary Communist Party of India	2	1	92,544	0.30
Left Front & allies	Biplobi Bangla Congress	1	0	50,414	0.16
Left Front & allies	Janata Dal	8	1	208,951	0.67
Left Front & allies	Akhil Bharatiya Gorkha League	1	0	35,489	0.11
Left Front & allies	Communist Revolutionary League of India	1	0	22,716	0.07
Congress & allies	Indian National Congress	284	43	10,875,834	35.12
Congress & allies	Gorkha National Liberation Front	3	3	146,541	0.47
Congress & allies	Jharkhand Party	6	1	140,391	0.45
Congress & allies	United Communist Party of India	1	0	40,806	0.13
Congress & allies	Congress-supported independent	1	0	40,426	0.13
Bharatiya Janata Party		291	0	3,513,121	11.34
Jharkhand Mukti Morcha		23	0	95,038	0.31
Bahujan Samaj Party		97	0	88,836	0.29
Janata Party		78	0	50,037	0.16
Communist Party of India (Marxist-Leninist)		18	0	41,828	0.14
Indian People's Front		23	0	39,004	0.13
Indian Union Muslim League		28	0	28,156	0.09
Amra Bangalee		60	0	22,295	0.07
Workers Party of India		6	0	10,670	0.03
Hul Jharkhand Party		3	0	9,239	0.03
Doordashti Party		26	0	4,980	0.02
Marxist Communist Party of India		5	0	3,804	0.01
Akhil Bharatiya Hindu Mahasabha		5	0	1,553	0.01
Akhil Bharatiya Jan Sangh		6	0	1,485	0.00
Indian National Congress (O) Anti Merger Group		5	0	1,309	0.00
All India Dalit Muslim Minorities Suraksha Mahasangh		2	0	988	0.00
Revolutionary Communist Party of India (Gouranga Sit)		1	0	983	0.00
Shiv Sena		1	0	880	0.00
Indian Congress (Socialist-Sarat Chandra Sinha)		1	0	876	0.00
Bolshevik Party of India		1	0	335	0.00
Bharat Dal		1	0	203	0.00
Lok Dal		1	0	121	0.00
Bidhan Dal		1	0	92	0.00
Independents; Including Socialist Unity Centre of India candidates		631	2	684,130	2.21%
Total		1,903	294	30,970,045	100
Source: Election Commission of India
