= 1990 elections in India =

Elections in India
← 1989	1990	1991 →

== Overall result ==
Date(s)	State	Government before	Chief Minister before	Government after	Elected Chief Minister	Maps
	Maharashtra	Indian National Congress	Sharad Pawar	Indian National Congress	Sharad Pawar	
	Himachal Pradesh	Indian National Congress	Virbhadra Singh	Bharatiya Janata Party	Shanta Kumar	
	Gujarat	Indian National Congress	Madhav Singh Solanki	Janata Dal	Chimanbhai Patel	
	Rajasthan	Indian National Congress	Hari Dev Joshi	Bharatiya Janata Party	Bhairon Singh Shekhawat	
	Madhya Pradesh	Indian National Congress	Shyama Charan Shukla	Bharatiya Janata Party	Sunder Lal Patwa	
	Manipur	Indian National Congress	Raj Kumar Jaichandra Singh	Manipur People's Party	Raj Kumar Ranbir Singh	
	Pondicherry	Indian National Congress	M. O. H. Farook	Dravida Munnetra Kazhagam	M. D. R. Ramachandran	
	Odisha	Indian National Congress	Hemananda Biswal	Janata Dal	Biju Patnaik	
	Bihar	Indian National Congress	Jagannath Mishra	Janata Dal	Lalu Prasad Yadav	
	Arunachal Pradesh	Indian National Congress	Gegong Apang	Indian National Congress	Gegong Apang	

== Legislative Assembly elections ==
=== Arunachal Pradesh ===
NATIONAL PARTIES	CONTESTED	WON	FD	VOTES	%	SEATS
1. INC	59	37	0	154463	44.25%	44.85%
2. JD	52	11	1	116383	33.34%	36.21%
3. JNP(JP)	7	1	4	7952	2.28%	14.77%
INDEPENDENTS						
4. IND	52	11	21	70300	20.14%	32.72%
Grand Total :	170	60	26	349098		

=== Pondicherry ===
Party	Votes	%	Seats	+/–
Indian National Congress	105,207	25.04	11	▼4
Dravida Munnetra Kazhagam	101,127	24.07	9	▲4
All India Anna Dravida Munnetra Kazhagam	76,337	18.17	3	▼3
Janata Dal	38,145	9.08	4	New
Communist Party of India	21,323	5.07	2	▲2
Others	44,475	10.58	0	0
Independents	33,557	7.99	1	▼1
Total	420,171	100.00	30	0
Valid votes	420,171	99.19		
Invalid/blank votes	3,416	0.81		
Total votes	423,587	100.00		
Registered voters/turnout	585,194	72.38		
Source: ECI

=== Bihar ===
Party	Seats contested	Seats	Seat change	Popular vote	Percentage
Janata Dal	276	122	New Party	8,212,666	25.61%
Indian National Congress	323	71	▼125	7,946,635	24.78%
Bharatiya Janata Party	237	39	▲23	3,721,392	11.61%
Communist Party of India	109	23	▲11	2,112,887	6.59%
Jharkhand Mukti Morcha	82	19	▲10	1,008,174	3.14%
Indian People's Front	82	7	New Party	889,068	2.77%
Communist Party of India (Marxist)	31	6	▲5	427,214	1.33%
Janata Party (JP)	158	3	New Party	494,717	1.54%
Marxist Co-ordination	11	2	New Party	70,365	0.22%
Jharkhand Dal	28	1	New Party	134,827	0.42%
Socialist Party (Lohia)	47	1	New Party	109,871	0.34%
Independents	4320	30	▲1	5,907,134	18.42%
Total	6629	324		32,063,793	

=== Gujarat ===
Parties and coalitions	Popular vote		Seats	
Parties and coalitions	Votes	%	Won	+/−
Janata Dal	3,725,148	29.36	70	+70
Bharatiya Janata Party (BJP)	3,386,256	26.69	67	+56
Indian National Congress (INC)	3,899,159	30.74	33	−116
Yuva Vikas Party (YVP)	1,07,220	2.47	1	+1
JNP	69,829	0.55	0	0
CPM	37,436	0.30	0	0
CPI	11,377	0.09	0	0
Bahujan Samaj Party (BSP)	4,565	0.04	0	0
Independents (IND)	1,323,790	10.44	11	
Total	12,685,977	100	182	±0
Valid votes	12,685,977	98.03		
Invalid votes	2,69,244	1.97		
Votes cast / turnout	12,955,221	52.20		
Registered voters	24,820,379			

=== Himachal Pradesh ===
Party	Votes	%	Seats	+/–
Bharatiya Janata Party	858,518	41.78	46	+39
Indian National Congress	750,885	36.54	9	–49
Janata Dal	222,542	10.83	11	New
Communist Party of India	42,393	2.06	1	+1
Others	55,139	2.68	0	0
Independents	125,421	6.10	1	–1
Total	2,054,898	100.00	68	0
Valid votes	2,054,898	99.20		
Invalid/blank votes	16,625	0.80		
Total votes	2,071,523	100.00		
Registered voters/turnout	2,993,699	69.20		
Source: ECI

=== Madhya Pradesh ===
SN	Party	Seats Contested	Seats won	Seats Changed	% Votes
1	Bharatiya Janata Party	269	220	+162	39.14%
2	Indian National Congress	318	56	-194	33.38%
3	Janata Dal	115	28	N/A	7.71%
4	Communist Party of India	183	3	N/A	1.25%
5	Bahujan Samaj Party	63	2	N/A	3.54%
6	Krantikari Samajwadi Manch	20	+1		0.40%
7	Independent	320	10	+4	12.31%
	Total		320		

=== Maharashtra ===
Political Party	No. of candidates	No. of elected	Votes polled	Votes (%)	Seat change
Indian National Congress	276	141	11,334,773	38.17%	▼20
Shiv Sena	183	52	4,733,834	15.94%	▲52
Bharatiya Janata Party	104	42	3,180,482	10.71%	▲26
Janata Dal	214	24	3,776,737	12.72%	▲24
Peasants and Workers Party of India	40	8	719,807	2.42%	▼5
Communist Party of India (Marxist)	13	3	258,433	0.87%	▲1
Communist Party of India	16	2	219,080	0.74%	Steady
Indian Congress (Socialist) – Sarat Chandra Sinha	71	1	290,503	0.98%	▲1
Independents	2286	13	4,036,403	13.59%	▼7

=== Manipur ===
Party	Votes	%	Seats	+/–
Indian National Congress	333,765	33.71	24	–6
Janata Dal	196,207	19.82	11	New
Manipur Peoples Party	192,075	19.40	9	+6
Indian Congress (Socialist) – Sarat Chandra Sinha	122,829	12.41	4	New
Communist Party of India	41,012	4.14	3	+2
Kuki National Assembly	25,867	2.61	2	+1
Bharatiya Janata Party	18,549	1.87	0	0
Manipur Hill People's Council	8,820	0.89	0	New
National People's Party (India)	7,762	0.78	1	New
Independents	43,101	4.35	0	–21
Total	989,987	100.00	54	–6
Valid votes	989,987	98.90		
Invalid/blank votes	10,997	1.10		
Total votes	1,000,984	100.00		
Registered voters/turnout	1,112,853	89.95		
Source: ECI

=== Odisha ===
Party	Votes	%	Seats	+/–
Janata Dal	5,884,443	53.69	123	+102
Indian National Congress	3,264,000	29.78	10	–107
Bharatiya Janata Party	390,060	3.56	2	+1
Communist Party of India	326,364	2.98	5	+4
Communist Party of India (Marxist)	91,767	0.84	1	0
Others	196,953	1.80	0	0
Independents	807,000	7.36	6	–1
Total	10,960,587	100.00	147	0
Valid votes	10,960,587	98.02		
Invalid/blank votes	221,565	1.98		
Total votes	11,182,152	100.00		
Registered voters/turnout	19,745,549	56.63		
Source: ECI

=== Rajasthan ===
Party	Votes	%	Seats	+/–
Indian National Congress	4,988,699	33.64	50	–63
Bharatiya Janata Party	3,744,945	25.25	85	+46
Janata Dal	3,200,662	21.58	55	+45
Communist Party of India (Marxist)	152,555	1.03	1	+1
Others	539,733	3.64	0	0
Independents	2,202,088	14.85	9	–1
Total	14,828,682	100.00	200	0
Valid votes	14,828,682	98.37		
Invalid/blank votes	245,106	1.63		
Total votes	15,073,788	100.00		
Registered voters/turnout	26,405,624	57.09		
Source: ECI
