= H. R. Gaviyappa =

Indian politician from Karnataka

Member of the Karnataka Legislative Assembly
- Incumbent
- Assumed office May 2023
- Preceded by: Anand Singh
- Constituency: Vijayanagara
- In office 2004–2007
- Preceded by: Jayalakshmi Gujjal
- Succeeded by: Anand Singh (As MLA for Vijayanagara)
- Constituency: Hospet

Personal details
- Party: Indian National Congress
- Other political affiliations: Bharatiya Janata Party
- Occupation: Politician

H. R. Gaviyappa is an Indian politician from Karnataka. He is currently serving as Member of the Legislative Assembly from Vijayanagara Assembly constituency. He is a member of the Indian National Congress party. He previously served as MLA of Hospet (Before that got renamed as Vijayanagara) from 2004 to 2007 as an Independent Politician.
