= Vijayanagara Assembly constituency =

Legislative Assembly constituency in Karnataka State, India

Coordinates: 15.27°N 76.38°E

Vijayanagara
- Constituency No. 90 for the Karnataka Legislative Assembly

Constituency details
- Country: India
- Region: South India
- State: Karnataka
- District: Vijayanagara
- Lok Sabha constituency: Bellary
- Established: 2008
- Total electors: 249,956
- Reservation: None

Member of Legislative Assembly
- 16th Karnataka Legislative Assembly
- Incumbent H. R. Gaviyappa
- Party: Indian National Congress
- Elected year: 2023
- Preceded by: Anand Singh

Vijayanagara Assembly constituency is one of the 224 Legislative Assembly constituencies of Karnataka in India.

It is part of Vijayanagara district. As of 2023, it is represented by H. R. Gaviyappa of the Indian National Congress.

== Members of the Legislative Assembly ==
Election	Member	Party
2008	Anand Singh	Bharatiya Janata Party
2013	Anand Singh	Bharatiya Janata Party
2018	Anand Singh	Indian National Congress
2019 By-election (Note: Disqualified by the Hon'ble Speaker under the 10th Schedule of the Constitution with effect from 25/07/2019)	Anand Singh	Bharatiya Janata Party
2023	H. R. Gaviyappa	Indian National Congress

== Election results ==
=== Assembly Election 2023 ===
2023 Karnataka Legislative Assembly election : Vijayanagara
Party	Candidate	Votes	%	±%
INC	H. R. Gaviyappa	104,863	57.99%	▲21.67
BJP	Siddharth Singh A. Thakur	71,140	39.34%	▼16.74
NOTA	None of the above	1,599	0.88%	▼0.31
Margin of victory		33,723	18.65%	▼1.11
Turnout		181,300	72.53%	▲7.61
Total valid votes		180,837		
Registered electors		249,956		▲5.39
INC gain from BJP		Swing	▲1.91	

=== Assembly By-election 2019 ===
2019 Karnataka Legislative Assembly by-election : Vijayanagara
Party	Candidate	Votes	%	±%
BJP	Anand Singh	85,477	56.08%	▲10.94
INC	V. Y. Ghorpade	55,352	36.32%	▼13.77
Independent	Kaviraju Urs	3,955	2.59%	New
JD(S)	N. M. Nabi	3,885	2.55%	▲0.24
NOTA	None of the above	1,821	1.19%	▲0.13
Margin of victory		30,125	19.76%	▲14.81
Turnout		153,976	64.92%	▼7.55
Total valid votes		152,417		
Registered electors		237,162		▲3.45
BJP gain from INC		Swing	▲5.99	

=== Assembly Election 2018 ===
2018 Karnataka Legislative Assembly election : Vijayanagara
Party	Candidate	Votes	%	±%
INC	Anand Singh	83,214	50.09%	▲22.03
BJP	H. R. Gaviyappa	74,986	45.14%	▼4.76
JD(S)	Deepak Singh	3,835	2.31%	New
NOTA	None of the above	1,754	1.06%	New
Margin of victory		8,228	4.95%	▼16.89
Turnout		166,142	72.47%	▼0.35
Total valid votes		166,130		
Registered electors		229,253		▲33.84
INC gain from BJP		Swing	▲0.19	

=== Assembly Election 2013 ===
2013 Karnataka Legislative Assembly election : Vijayanagara
Party	Candidate	Votes	%	±%
BJP	Anand Singh	69,995	49.90%	▲1.41
INC	H. Abdul Wahab	39,358	28.06%	▲4.08
BSRCP	B. L. Rani Samyuktha	6,406	4.57%	New
Independent	Mohammed Abdul Lateef	1,039	0.74%	New
CPI(M)	Bhaskar Reddy	944	0.67%	New
BSP	Ganesh	937	0.67%	▼0.65
Independent	S. M. Manohara	877	0.63%	New
Margin of victory		30,637	21.84%	▼2.67
Turnout		124,740	72.82%	▲5.52
Total valid votes		140,277		
Registered electors		171,289		▲6.62
BJP hold		Swing	▲1.41	

=== Assembly Election 2008 ===
2008 Karnataka Legislative Assembly election : Vijayanagara
Party	Candidate	Votes	%	±%
BJP	Anand Singh	52,418	48.49%	New
INC	H. R. Gaviyappa	25,921	23.98%	New
Independent	Deepak Kumar Singh	24,980	23.11%	New
Independent	P. Nagaraja	2,062	1.91%	New
BSP	K. Narayana Swamy	1,426	1.32%	New
JD(S)	K. Kotresh	1,290	1.19%	New
Margin of victory		26,497	24.51%	
Turnout		108,120	67.30%	
Total valid votes		108,097		
Registered electors		160,652		
BJP win (new seat)				

== See also ==
- List of constituencies of the Karnataka Legislative Assembly
- Vijayanagara district
