= Dharam Vir Vasisht =

Indian politician

Member of Parliament, Lok Sabha
- In office 1977–1980
- Succeeded by: Tayyab Husain
- Preceded by: Constituency established
- Constituency: Faridabad

Personal details
- Party: Janata Party

Dharam Vir Vasisht was an Indian politician and Member of Parliament in the Lok Sabha, the lower house of Indian Parliament. He won this seat in the 1977 Indian general election as a Janata Party candidate from Haryana's Faridabad constituency, the first candidate to be elected from the newly established constituency.
