= Fazal Hussain (politician) =

Indian politician

Personal details
- Party: Bahujan Samaj Party
- Relations: Zakir Hussain (brother); Zahida Khan (sister)
- Parent: Tayyab Husain
- Profession: Politician, advocate

Fazal Hussain is an Indian politician and a member of the Bahujan Samaj Party. He was a Candidate for Lok Sabha from the Alwar constituency of Rajasthan.

== Early life ==
Husain was born to Tayyab Husain in the village of Rehna which is situated in the Nuh district of Haryana. He has a brother, Zakir Hussain, and a sister, Zahida Khan. He is part of a prolific political dynasty in the Mewat region.
