= Zahida Khan (Indian politician) =

Indian Politician from Indian National Congress

Chaudhrani Zahida Khan
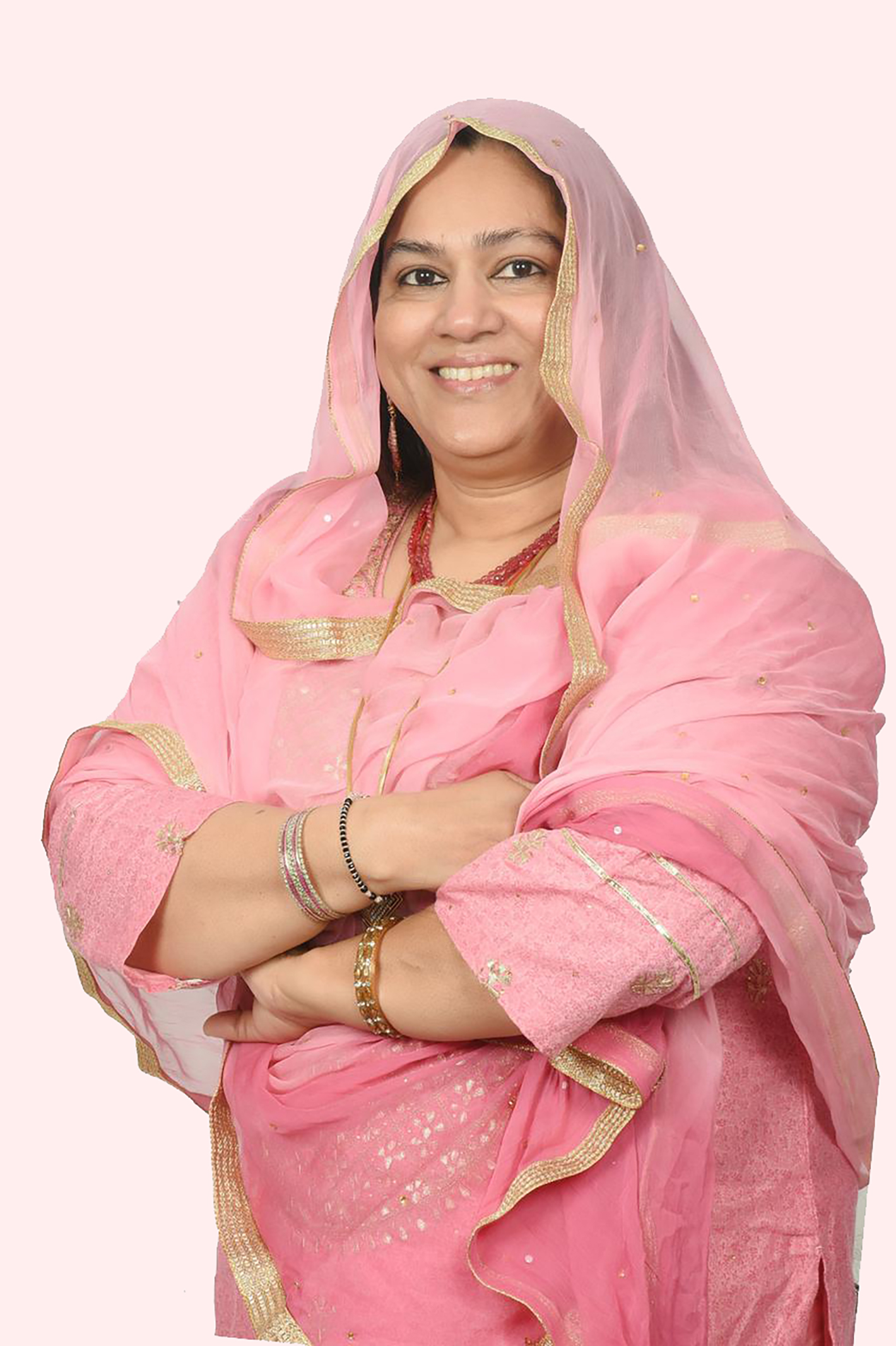

Minister of State for Education, Government of Rajasthan
- In office 27 December 2018 – 3 December 2023
- Additional Ministries and Departments: Science & Technology (Independent Charge); Printing & Stationery (Independent Charge); Arts; Literature; Culture & ASI
- Succeeded by: Madan Dilawar

Member of the Rajasthan Legislative Assembly
- In office 3 December 2018 – 3 December 2023
- Preceded by: Jagat Singh
- Succeeded by: Nauksham Chaudhary
- Constituency: Kaman
- In office 8 December 2008 – 8 December 2013
- Preceded by: Madan Mohan Singhal
- Succeeded by: Jagat Singh
- Constituency: Kaman

Personal details
- Born: 8 March 1968 (age 58)
- Party: Indian National Congress
- Spouse: Jalees Khan
- Parent: Tayyab Husain
- Profession: Politician

Chaudhrani Zahida Khan (née Hussain; born 8 March 1968) is an Indian politician from the Indian National Congress, who formerly served as the Minister of State for Education of Rajasthan. She is a former Member of the Rajasthan Legislative Assembly from Kaman Assembly constituency. She was initially elected in 2008 and then re-elected in 2018. She was also appointed the General Secretary of All India Mahila Congress in October 2011.

== Early life ==
She was born to Tayyab Husain on 8 March 1968. She has two brothers, Zakir Hussain and Fazal Hussain. Her father served as Cabinet Minister and Member of the Legislative Assembly in the three states of Punjab, Rajasthan and Haryana. He also served as a Member of Parliament in the Lok Sabha from Gurgaon and Faridabad in Haryana. Her father was also a previous Legislative Assembly seat holder from the Kaman constituency in Rajasthan.

== Personal ==
She is married to Jalees Khan.

== Controversies ==
=== Anti-incumbency protests 2023 ===
In the lead-up to the Rajasthan Assembly Elections of 2023, incidents involving Khan garnered attention. One such incident occurred in Bharatpur, where Jalees Khan, Zahida Khan's husband and a minority leader from AICC, alongside Nadeem Javed, visited to gather public feedback. However, their visit was met with strong opposition from villagers in the Pahari police station area of Deeg district.

The villagers, particularly from Pahari village Tilakpuri, vehemently protested against Jalees Khan's car. Stones were thrown at the vehicle, indicating the intensity of their displeasure. Similar dissent was observed in Kaman, Deeg district, where locals protested against Zahida Khan, expressing dissatisfaction with her tenure as Minister of State in the Rajasthan Government. During these protests, Jalees Khan faced the brunt of public anger, necessitating a swift evacuation from the site due to escalating tensions. The situation grew volatile as people chased the car, chanting slogans against Zahida Khan's husband and pelting stones at the vehicle, causing damage to the rear glass.

Further controversies emerged when Congress party observer Nadeem Javed visited Kaman. Hundreds of villagers gathered, conducting a rally against Minister Zahida Khan, asserting their disapproval of her candidacy. Some voiced concerns over alleged nepotism, citing their reluctance to vote for her in the upcoming elections.

Additionally, discontent brewed amongst Kaman residents in Delhi when news surfaced of Minister Zahida Khan attending a Congress High Command meeting. Residents gathered at the AICC office, brandishing placards and demanding that Zahida Khan not be nominated for the upcoming elections, citing their grievances against her.

These incidents highlight the dissatisfaction and opposition Zahida Khan faced from various quarters, leading to public protests and calls against her candidacy in the Rajasthan Assembly Elections of 2023. Khan still received the Indian National Congress ticket and contested the 2023 Legislative assembly elections.

On 3 December 2023, she faced defeat to Nauksham Chaudhary, the candidate representing the Bharatiya Janata Party, securing a third-place position subsequent to Mukhtyar Ahmed, an independent candidate. Her electoral setback has been attributed to the opposition generated by protests and anti-incumbency sentiments directed towards her candidacy.
