= Nauksham Chaudhary =

Indian politician

Member of the Rajasthan Legislative Assembly
- Incumbent
- Assumed office 3 December 2023
- Preceded by: Zahida Khan
- Constituency: Kaman

Personal details
- Born: 22 October 1993 (age 33) Paima Khera, Punahana, Haryana, India
- Party: Bharatiya Janata Party
- Education: B.A., M A. & Marketing communications
- Alma mater: Miranda House
- Occupation: MLA
- Profession: Fashion designer

Nauksham Chaudhary (born 22 October 1993) is an Indian politician from the Bharatiya Janata Party. She is a Member of the Rajasthan Legislative Assembly from the Kaman Assembly constituency. She previously contested the Haryana Legislative Assembly elections from the Punhana Assembly constituency in 2019.

== Personal life ==
Nauksham Chaudhary was born into a Koli family to Ram Kumar and Ranjit Kaur in Paima Khera, situated within the Nuh district of Haryana. Her father retired as a judge and follows Hinduism, while her mother, Ranjit Kaur, serves as a bureaucrat. Additionally, she spent her younger years in Chandigarh and later resided in Delhi.

She pursued her Bachelor's degree at Miranda House, Delhi University before undertaking her Masters in Modern Indian History. She also attained a Master's degree in Luxury Brand Management from Istituto Marangoni in Milan, Italy, followed by another Master's degree in Media and Communications from London, England.

== Political career ==
She joined Bharatiya Janata Party after returning to India and was nominated as a party candidate from the Punahana constituency in the 2019 Haryana Legislative Assembly elections but she lost to the Indian National Congress candidate, Mohammad Ilyas. She is also leading pro-CAA campaign in Haryana.

On 3 December 2023, she won the Rajasthan Legislative Assembly elections with a total voter turnout of 78646 votes, defeating the previous office holder and Rajasthan Minister of State, Zahida Khan.
