= Jayalakshmi Gujjal =

Indian politician

Jayalakshmi Gujjal is an Indian politician from Karnataka. She was elected as a Member of the Legislative Assembly in 1999 from Hospet Assembly constituency representing the Indian National Congress.

Gujjal is from Hospet, Karnataka.

Gujjal first became an MLA winning the 1999 Karnataka Legislative Assembly election from Hospet Assembly constituency representing the Indian National Congress. She polled 47,220 votes and defeated her nearest rival, G Shankargoud of the Bharatiya Janata Party, by a margin of 11,205 votes.
