= 1991 Rajya Sabha elections =

Elections for the Upper House of Indian Parliament

Rajya Sabha elections were held on various dates in 1991, to elect members of the Rajya Sabha, Indian Parliament's upper chamber.

== Elections ==
Elections were held to elect members from various states.

=== Members elected ===
The following members are elected in the elections held in 1991. They are members for the term 1991-1997 and retire in year 1997, except in case of the resignation or death before the term. The list is incomplete.

State - Member - Party

Rajya Sabha members for term 1991-1997
State	Member Name	Party	Remark
Assam	Manmohan Singh	INC	October 1
Kerala	N. E. Balaram	CPI	death 16/07/1994
Kerala	S._Ramachandran_Pillai	CPM	
Nominated	R K Karanjia	NOM	
Puducherry	V Narayanasamy	INC	

== Bye-elections ==
The following bye elections were held in the year 1991.

State - Member - Party

1. Orissa - Chandra Mohan Sinha - JD ( ele 19/03/1991 term till 1992 )
2. Kerala - T. G. Balakrishna Pillai - INC ( ele 30/07/1991 term till 1992 )
3. Madhya Pradesh - Raghavji - BJP ( ele 12/08/1991 term till 1992 )
4. Assam - Basanti Sarma - INC ( ele 03/09/1991 term till 1996 ) dea of Dinesh Goswami of AGP on 02/06/1991
5. Karnataka - Satchidananda - INC ( ele 03/09/1991 term till 1992 )
