= 1990 Rajasthan Legislative Assembly election =

Election in Indian state

- 27 February 1990

All 200 seats in the Rajasthan Legislative Assembly 101 seats needed for a majority
- Registered: 7,284,612
- Turnout: 32.74%
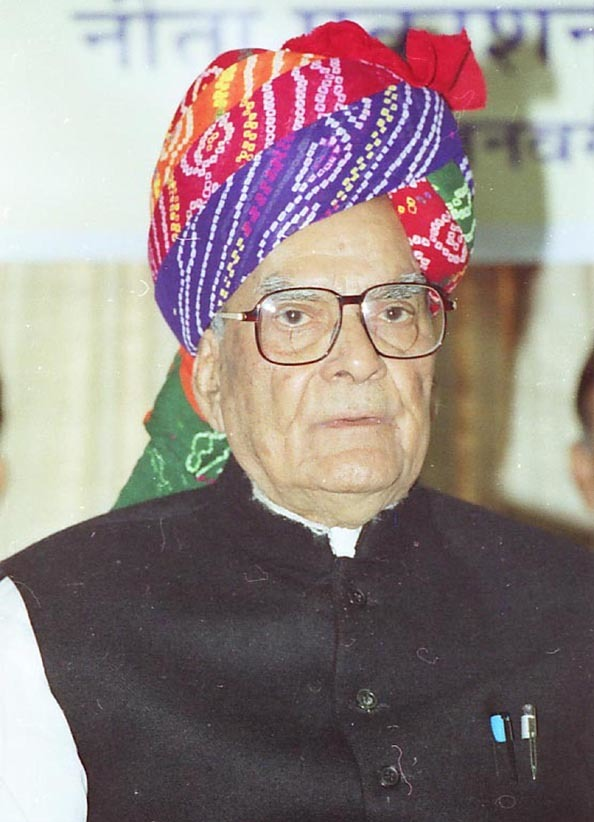

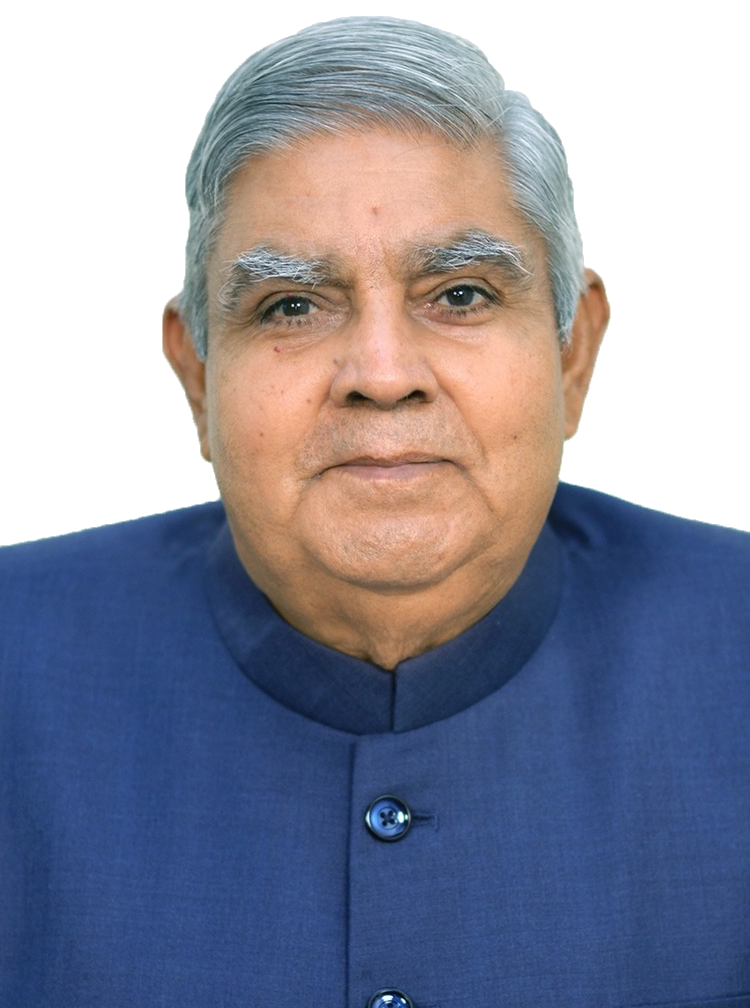
	Majority party	Minority party
Leader	Bhairon Singh Shekhawat
Party	BJP	INC
Leader's seat	Dholpur and Chhabra (vacated),
Seats before	39	113
Seats won	85	50
Seat change	▲46	▼63
Popular vote	25.25%	33.64%
	Third party	Fourth party
		CPI(M)
Leader	Jagdeep Dhankhar
Party	JD	CPI(M)
Seats before	10	0
Seats won	55	1
Seat change	▲45	▲1
Popular vote	21.58%	1.03%
CM before election
Hari Dev Joshi
INC
Elected CM
Bhairon Singh Shekhawat
BJP

Elections to the Rajasthan Legislative Assembly were held in February 1990 to elect members of the 200 constituencies in Rajasthan, India. The Indian National Congress won the popular vote, but the Bharatiya Janata Party won the most seats and its leader Bhairon Singh Shekhawat was appointed as the Chief Minister of Rajasthan for his second term. The number of constituencies was set as 200 by the recommendation of the Delimitation Commission of India.

== Results ==
Party	Votes	%	Seats	+/–
Indian National Congress	4,988,699	33.64	50	▼63
Bharatiya Janata Party	3,744,945	25.25	85	▲46
Janata Dal	3,200,662	21.58	55	▲45
Communist Party of India (Marxist)	152,555	1.03	1	▲1
Others	539,733	3.64	0	0
Independents	2,202,088	14.85	9	▼1
Total	14,828,682	100.00	200	0
Valid votes	14,828,682	98.37		
Invalid/blank votes	245,106	1.63		
Total votes	15,073,788	100.00		
Registered voters/turnout	26,405,624	57.09		
Source: ECI

== Voter statistics ==
Electors
	Men	Women	Total
No. of electors	13992924	12412700	26405624
No. of electors who voted	8675707	6398081	15073788
Polling percentage	62.00%	51.54%	57.09%

== Elected members ==
Constituency		Winner				Runner Up				Margin	%
No.	Name	Candidate	Party	Votes	%	Candidate	Party	Votes	%	Margin	%
1	Bhadra	Lal Chand	JD	47,217	51.28	Gyan Singh	INC	35,276	38.31	11,941	12.97
2	Nohar	Suchitra Arya	JD	38,913	43.03	Luxmi Narayan	INC	29,413	32.52	9,500	10.51
3	Tibi (SC)	Doongar Ram Panwar	JD	37,677	42.75	Birbal	INC	34,353	38.98	3,324	3.77
4	Hanumangarh	Vinod Kumar	INC	33,247	36.17	Ram Pratap	IND	19,266	20.96	13,981	15.21
5	Sangaria	Het Ram Beniwal	CPI(M)	28,548	28.64	Krishan Kumar	JD	20,000	20.07	8,548	8.57
6	Ganganagar	Kedar	JD	37,585	50.18	Radhey Shyam	INC	33,423	44.62	4,162	5.56
7	Kesrisinghpur (SC)	Hira Lal Indora	INC	20,779	33.57	Kartara Ram	JD	17,084	27.60	3,695	5.97
8	Karanpur	Kundan Lal	BJP	21,966	30.85	Harinder Singh	IND	16,916	23.76	5,050	7.09
9	Raisinghnagar (SC)	Ram Swroop	JD	38,443	48.09	Dula Ram	INC	21,786	27.25	16,657	20.84
10	Pilibanga	Ram Pratap Kasniya	IND	26,823	29.45	Ram Swroop	INC	18,035	19.80	8,788	9.65
11	Suratgarh	Sunil Kumar	INC	41,568	30.15	Amar Chand	IND	28,716	20.83	12,852	9.32
12	Lunkaransar	Mani Ram	JD	43,078	36.91	Bhom Raj Godara	INC	36,757	31.49	6,321	5.42
13	Bikaner	Bulaki Das Kalla	INC	37,149	41.31	Manik Chand Surana	JD	30,122	33.49	7,027	7.82
14	Kolayat	Devi Singh Bhati	JD	59,898	50.50	Gopal Krishan	INC	37,722	31.80	22,176	18.70
15	Nokha (SC)	Chunni Lal Indalia	JD	41,049	53.71	Puran Ram	INC	30,198	39.52	10,851	14.19
16	Dungargarh	Kishana Ram	BJP	39,477	44.84	Kumbha Ram Ariya	JD	31,354	35.61	8,123	9.23
17	Sujangarh (SC)	Bhanwar Lal	INC	33,474	43.03	Rawat Ram	IND	19,903	25.58	13,571	17.45
18	Ratangarh	Hari Shankar	BJP	23,479	32.82	Anand Mangal Mishra	INC	20,842	29.14	2,637	3.68
19	Sardarshahar	Bhanwar Lal Sharma	JD	31,094	34.22	Ramesh Kumar Potliya	CPI(M)	23,617	25.99	7,477	8.23
20	Churu	Rajender Rathod	JD	49,781	61.48	Hamida Begam	INC	25,398	31.37	24,383	30.11
21	Taranagar	Chandra Mal Baid	INC	32,999	41.84	Ram Lal	JD	20,799	26.37	12,200	15.47
22	Sadulpur	Inder Singh Poonia	INC	31,630	38.34	Ram Singh	IND	25,853	31.34	5,777	7.00
23	Pilani	Sumitra Singh	JD	60,022	59.08	Ramawtar Daand	INC	36,121	35.56	23,901	23.52
24	Surajgarh (SC)	Babu Lal	JD	54,765	59.73	Sundar Lal	INC	35,114	38.30	19,651	21.43
25	Khetri	Hajari Lal	IND	22,006	28.52	Jitender Singh	INC	21,387	27.71	619	0.81
26	Gudha	Madan Lal Sani	BJP	22,193	25.68	Virender Pratap Singh	JD	20,914	24.20	1,279	1.48
27	Nawalgarh	Bharwar Singh	IND	37,894	37.77	Navraj Singh	JD	37,021	36.90	873	0.87
28	Jhunjhunu	Mohd. Mahir Azad	JD	50,092	49.62	Shish Ram Ola	INC	38,462	38.10	11,630	11.52
29	Mandawa	Chandra Bhan	JD	52,019	59.40	Sudha Devi	INC	22,565	25.77	29,454	33.63
30	Fatehpur	Dilsukhrai	JD	35,767	36.77	Mohd. Hanif A.	INC	26,669	27.42	9,098	9.35
31	Lachhmangarh (SC)	Parasram	INC	51,389	50.42	Bhagatram	JD	45,917	45.05	5,472	5.37
32	Sikar	Rajendra Kumar	INC	49,560	49.25	Ghanshyam Tiwari	BJP	41,022	40.77	8,538	8.48
33	Dhod	Ram Dev Singh	INC	32,906	34.76	Jai Singh Shekhavat	JD	30,614	32.34	2,292	2.42
34	Danta - Ramgarh	Ajey Singh	JD	42,475	45.81	Narayan Singh	INC	36,312	39.16	6,163	6.65
35	Srimadhopur	Har Lal Singh Kharra	BJP	45,921	55.15	Sanwar Mal	INC	25,306	30.39	20,615	24.76
36	Khandela	Gopal Singh	JD	47,992	56.22	Mahadev Singh	INC	34,225	40.09	13,767	16.13
37	Neem-Ka-Thana	Phool Chand	BJP	42,661	49.79	Mohan Lal	INC	35,939	41.94	6,722	7.85
38	Chomu	Rameshwar Dayal	JD	37,287	44.60	Bhagwan Sahai Saini	INC	33,011	39.49	4,276	5.11
39	Amber	Gopi Ram	BJP	44,196	54.04	Ram Paratap Katriya	INC	19,071	23.32	25,125	30.72
40	Jaipur Rural	Ujla Arora	BJP	33,733	57.16	Aruna	INC	18,512	31.37	15,221	25.79
41	Hawamahal	Bhanwar Lal	BJP	37,562	69.07	Mahesh Joshi	INC	13,164	24.21	24,398	44.86
42	Johribazar	Kali Charan Saraph	BJP	61,132	58.86	Sayed Khan	INC	36,257	34.91	24,875	23.95
43	Kishanpole	Rameshwar Bhardwaj	BJP	52,135	57.40	Sri Ram Gotewala	INC	16,229	17.87	35,906	39.53
44	Bani Park	Rajpal Singh Shekhawat	BJP	47,277	46.17	Shiv Ram Sharma	INC	26,433	25.82	20,844	20.35
45	Phulera	Hari Singh	INC	36,361	39.33	Laxmi Narain Kisan	JD	33,172	35.88	3,189	3.45
46	Dudu (SC)	Ganpatrai Gade Ganwalia	JD	35,147	55.90	Bhanwar Lal Verma	INC	20,940	33.30	14,207	22.60
47	Sanganer	Vidhya Pathak	BJP	32,878	46.03	Indira Maya Ram	INC	21,016	29.42	11,862	16.61
48	Phagi (SC)	Parkash Chand Bairwa	INC	19,829	34.13	Ram Kunwar Bairwa	JD	19,573	33.69	256	0.44
49	Lalsot (ST)	Parsadi	INC	38,601	52.75	Meethalal	JD	32,649	44.62	5,952	8.13
50	Sikrai (ST)	Ram Kishore Meena	BJP	27,047	42.73	Mahendra Kumar Meena	IND	21,587	34.11	5,460	8.62
51	Bandikui	Ram Kishor Saini	BJP	27,119	34.97	Bhairu Singh Gurjar	INC	22,490	29.00	4,629	5.97
52	Dausa (SC)	Jia Lal Banshiwal	BJP	35,292	62.64	Bhudhar Mal Verma	INC	15,066	26.74	20,226	35.90
53	Bassi	Kanhiya Lal	IND	27,361	35.73	Jagdish Prasad Tiwari	INC	26,705	34.87	656	0.86
54	Jamwa Ramgarh	Rameshwar	BJP	21,345	33.41	Suraj Mal Yogi	INC	16,241	25.42	5,104	7.99
55	Bairath	Om Parkash Gupta	BJP	45,413	57.53	Kamla	INC	30,697	38.89	14,716	18.64
56	Kotputli	Ram Karan Singh	IND	33,654	36.62	Ramji Lal	INC	32,871	35.77	783	0.85
57	Bansur	Jagat Singh Dayma	JD	43,158	54.76	Rohitash Kumar	INC	31,061	39.41	12,097	15.35
58	Behror	Mahi Pal Yadava	JD	42,467	56.66	Sujan Singh	INC	13,374	17.84	29,093	38.82
59	Mandawar	Ghasi Ram	INC	32,678	47.49	Mahender Shastri	JD	32,123	46.68	555	0.81
60	Tizara	Jagmal Singh Yadav	JD	34,280	41.29	Ayub Khan	IND	21,819	26.28	12,461	15.01
61	Khairthal (SC)	Sampat Ram	JD	37,119	63.90	Chandra Shekhar	INC	14,206	24.46	22,913	39.44
62	Ramgarh	Zubair Khan	INC	32,208	44.67	Raghuvar Dayal Goyal	BJP	17,647	24.47	14,561	20.20
63	Alwar	Jeet Mal Jain	BJP	33,601	45.12	Ashok Kumar Agarwal	INC	16,020	21.51	17,581	23.61
64	Thanagazi	Rama Kant	BJP	29,882	52.87	Rajesh	INC	15,886	28.11	13,996	24.76
65	Rajgarh (ST)	Ram Meena	INC	37,094	49.54	Samrath Lal	BJP	35,831	47.85	1,263	1.69
66	Lachhmangarh	Ishwar Lal Saini	INC	29,095	37.08	Nasroo	JD	24,805	31.61	4,290	5.47
67	Kathumar (SC)	Jagan Nath Pahadia	INC	26,992	40.05	Ramji Lal Jatav	BJP	17,299	25.67	9,693	14.38
68	Kaman	Madan Mohan Singhal	IND	20,783	31.79	Shamshul Hasan	INC	13,177	20.15	7,606	11.64
69	Nagar	Sampat Singh	JD	10,945	17.16	Gopi Chand	IND	8,384	13.14	2,561	4.02
70	Deeg	Krishanandra Kaur	JD	39,433	60.13	Man Singh	IND	14,267	21.76	25,166	38.37
71	Kumher	Nathi Singh	JD	29,708	51.27	Hari Singh	INC	18,127	31.29	11,581	19.98
72	Bharatpur	Ram Kishan	JD	25,801	37.61	Ku. Arun Singh	IND	20,423	29.77	5,378	7.84
73	Rupbas (SC)	Nirbhaya Lal Jatav	JD	30,548	62.08	Sunder Singh Koli	IND	8,513	17.30	22,035	44.78
74	Nadbai	Yadunath Singh	JD	27,845	45.01	Sujan Singh	INC	16,999	27.48	10,846	17.53
75	Weir (SC)	Ram Prasad	INC	17,635	33.99	Revati Prasad Koli	IND	14,327	27.62	3,308	6.37
76	Bayana	Salig Ram Neta	INC	15,275	21.91	Brajendra Singh	IND	14,852	21.31	423	0.60
77	Rajakhera	Pradyuman Singh	INC	40,460	50.08	Mohan Prakash	JD	38,183	47.26	2,277	2.82
78	Dholpur	Bhairo Singh	BJP	50,243	56.60	Banmari Lal	INC	36,651	41.29	13,592	15.31
79	Bari	Daljeet Singh	INC	42,972	51.54	Devendra Singh Kasana	IND	18,983	22.77	23,989	28.77
80	Karauli	Janardan Singh	INC	36,569	42.97	Shiv Charan Singh	BJP	31,744	37.30	4,825	5.67
81	Sapotra (ST)	Parbhu Lal	INC	29,492	46.74	Rangji	IND	24,351	38.59	5,141	8.15
82	Khandar (SC)	Chunni Lal	BJP	38,176	61.33	Gopi Nath	INC	21,597	34.69	16,579	26.64
83	Sawai Madhopur	Moti Lal	JD	20,709	26.36	Muntaj	IND	13,165	16.75	7,544	9.61
84	Bamanwas (ST)	Kunji Lal	BJP	41,262	49.62	Hira Lal	IND	28,247	33.97	13,015	15.65
85	Gangapur	Govind Sahai	BJP	34,284	45.25	Munir Khan	JD	12,511	16.51	21,773	28.74
86	Hindaun (SC)	Bharosi	JD	39,451	51.39	Kalu Ram	INC	34,741	45.25	4,710	6.14
87	Mahuwa	Hari Singh	INC	44,970	50.43	Bir Bahadur Singh	BJP	39,703	44.53	5,267	5.90
88	Toda Bhim (ST)	Ram Sawroop	INC	29,770	39.99	Wati Lal	BJP	27,671	37.17	2,099	2.82
89	Niwai (SC)	Ram Narain Berwa	BJP	32,116	54.39	Jai Narain Salodia	INC	24,675	41.79	7,441	12.60
90	Tonk	Mahaveer Prasad	BJP	36,748	51.41	Zakiya Inam	INC	21,073	29.48	15,675	21.93
91	Uniara	Dig Vijai Singh	JD	27,702	39.05	Ram Lal	INC	16,700	23.54	11,002	15.51
92	Todaraisingh	Ghasi Lal	INC	25,109	38.55	Ajeet Singh	BJP	22,915	35.18	2,194	3.37
93	Malpura	Surendra Vyas	INC	39,820	47.98	Narayan Singh	JD	24,687	29.75	15,133	18.23
94	Kishangarh	Jagjeet Singh	BJP	37,804	48.13	Prabha Thakur	INC	26,821	34.15	10,983	13.98
95	Ajmer East (SC)	Shri Kishan Songra	BJP	35,783	55.41	Ram Babu Shubham	INC	27,096	41.95	8,687	13.46
96	Ajmer West	Harish Jhamnani	BJP	28,176	51.94	Kishan Motwani	INC	21,287	39.24	6,889	12.70
97	Pushkar	Ramjan Khan	BJP	29,449	41.04	Nilima	INC	21,072	29.36	8,377	11.68
98	Nasirabad	Govind Singh	INC	30,373	46.03	Harish Chander Ch.	JD	21,445	32.50	8,928	13.53
99	Beawar	Champalal Jain	IND	18,532	28.07	Lal Singh	IND	16,401	24.84	2,131	3.23
100	Masuda	Kishan Gopal Kogta	BJP	27,507	44.75	Ramchandra Chaudhari	INC	16,362	26.62	11,145	18.13
101	Bhinai	Sanwar Lal	JD	36,720	60.22	Raghunandan	INC	19,831	32.52	16,889	27.70
102	Kekri (SC)	Shambhu Dayal	JD	31,874	50.33	Lalit Bhati	INC	28,016	44.24	3,858	6.09
103	Hindoli	Rama Pailot	INC	30,014	46.24	Pokhar Lal	BJP	20,293	31.26	9,721	14.98
104	Nainwa	Ram Narain Verma	INC	19,713	31.03	Hari Prasad Sharma	BJP	18,657	29.36	1,056	1.67
105	Patan (SC)	Mangi Lal Meghwal	BJP	33,012	64.19	Dinesh Kumar	INC	17,213	33.47	15,799	30.72
106	Bundi	Krishna Kumar Goyal	BJP	35,606	52.36	Hari Mohan	INC	22,233	32.70	13,373	19.66
107	Kota	Lalit Kishor Chaturvedi	BJP	46,204	51.95	Lila Dhar Agarwal	INC	18,182	20.44	28,022	31.51
108	Ladpura	Arjun Dass Madan	BJP	42,042	47.68	Ram Kishan	INC	23,546	26.70	18,496	20.98
109	Digod	Brij Raj Meena	BJP	25,010	33.77	Bharat Singh	IND	15,882	21.44	9,128	12.33
110	Pipalda (SC)	Hira Lal Arya	BJP	32,399	57.73	Krishan Gopal Chohan	INC	17,822	31.76	14,577	25.97
111	Baran	Raghu Veer Singh	BJP	37,014	52.50	Rajendra	INC	16,514	23.42	20,500	29.08
112	Kishanganj (ST)	Hem Raj	BJP	35,193	52.84	Hira Lal Sharia	INC	27,609	41.45	7,584	11.39
113	Atru (SC)	Madan Dilawar	BJP	33,681	59.92	Ram Charan	INC	16,235	28.88	17,446	31.04
114	Chhabra	Bhairon Singh Shekhawat	BJP	45,599	69.11	Tej Raj Singh	IND	10,550	15.99	35,049	53.12
115	Ramganjmandi	Hari Kumar	BJP	28,516	44.46	Hukam Chand	INC	13,229	20.63	15,287	23.83
116	Khanpur	Chatur Bhuj	BJP	33,184	56.64	Shri Kishan	INC	19,611	33.48	13,573	23.16
117	Manohar Thana	Jagannath	BJP	34,663	60.73	Sujan Singh	INC	19,798	34.69	14,865	26.04
118	Jhalrapatan	Anang Kumar	BJP	44,546	63.60	Jwala Prasad	INC	13,386	19.11	31,160	44.49
119	Pirawa	Nafis Ahmad Khan	JD	20,758	32.18	Narayan Singh	BJP	19,633	30.44	1,125	1.74
120	Dag (SC)	Bal Chand	BJP	37,879	58.63	Kanhiya Lal	INC	22,671	35.09	15,208	23.54
121	Begun	Chunni Lal	BJP	31,400	47.04	Pankaj Pancholi	INC	19,777	29.63	11,623	17.41
122	Gangrar (SC)	Mangai Lal	BJP	21,738	45.07	Bheru Lal	INC	14,642	30.36	7,096	14.71
123	Kapasin	Mohan Lal Chittoriya	JD	43,964	68.43	Mohan Lala Jat Usrol	INC	15,949	24.83	28,015	43.60
124	Chittorgarh	Vijay Singh Jhala	BJP	21,539	31.03	Narender Singh	INC	20,428	29.43	1,111	1.60
125	Nimbahera	Shri Chand Kriplani	BJP	49,728	50.69	Udai Lal Ajana	INC	42,094	42.91	7,634	7.78
126	Badi Sadri	Chhagan Lal	BJP	25,551	36.17	Udai Ram Dhaker	INC	18,175	25.73	7,376	10.44
127	Pratapgarh (ST)	Rakhab Chand	BJP	34,358	54.30	Bahadur Lal	INC	24,743	39.10	9,615	15.20
128	Kushalgarh (ST)	Fateh Singh	JD	40,987	66.35	Var Singh	INC	17,727	28.70	23,260	37.65
129	Danpur (ST)	Bahadur Singh	JD	44,473	61.43	Prabbu Lal Rawat	INC	20,695	28.59	23,778	32.84
130	Ghatol (ST)	Navneet Lal Ninama	BJP	25,299	39.14	Jitendra Ninama	INC	24,547	37.98	752	1.16
131	Banswara	Hari Deo Joshi	INC	42,521	66.03	Manilal Bohra	BJP	11,624	18.05	30,897	47.98
132	Bagidora (ST)	Soma	JD	27,669	42.87	Mahendra Malviya	INC	21,567	33.41	6,102	9.46
133	Sagwara (ST)	Kamla Bheel	INC	21,382	35.23	Kankamal Katara	BJP	21,318	35.12	64	0.11
134	Chorasi (ST)	Jeeva Ram Katara	BJP	22,739	42.31	Shanker Lal Ahari	INC	19,453	36.19	3,286	6.12
135	Dungarpur (ST)	Nathu Ram Ahari	INC	23,794	46.69	Amrit Lal Parmar	BJP	20,544	40.31	3,250	6.38
136	Aspur (ST)	Mahender Kumar Parmar	INC	28,746	53.12	Lalit Mohan	BJP	21,254	39.27	7,492	13.85
137	Lasadia (ST)	Narayan Lal	BJP	30,178	59.67	Tara Chand	INC	13,832	27.35	16,346	32.32
138	Vallabhnagar	Kamlender Singh	JD	39,889	52.56	Gulab Singh	INC	31,716	41.79	8,173	10.77
139	Mavli	Shanti Lal Chaplot	BJP	46,221	60.28	Hanuman Parbhakar	INC	26,354	34.37	19,867	25.91
140	Rajsamand (SC)	Shanti Lal	BJP	34,593	54.84	Nana Lal	INC	22,546	35.74	12,047	19.10
141	Nathdwara	Shiv Dan Singh	BJP	37,633	54.98	C. P. Joshi	INC	27,949	40.84	9,684	14.14
142	Udaipur	Shiv Kishot Snadhya	BJP	38,582	55.27	Girija Vyas	INC	28,218	40.42	10,364	14.85
143	Udaipur Rural (ST)	Chunni Lal	BJP	36,872	58.89	Nand Lal	INC	24,323	38.85	12,549	20.04
144	Salumber (ST)	Phool Chand Meena	BJP	25,906	57.07	Than Singh	INC	18,562	40.89	7,344	16.18
145	Sarada (ST)	Gameer Lal Meena	BJP	28,259	49.62	Bheru Lal Meena	INC	22,154	38.90	6,105	10.72
146	Kherwara (ST)	Dayaram Parmar	INC	25,749	47.10	Surya Prakash Doda	BJP	17,947	32.83	7,802	14.27
147	Phalasia (ST)	Kuber Singh	INC	16,257	33.07	Hakara Bhai	BJP	15,869	32.28	388	0.79
148	Gongunda (ST)	Bhura Lal	BJP	23,437	68.32	Devendra Kumar	INC	8,561	24.95	14,876	43.37
149	Kumbhalgarh	Heera Lal Deopura	INC	23,900	35.31	Goivnd Singh Saktawat	BJP	21,040	31.08	2,860	4.23
150	Bhim	Mandhata Singh	JD	34,123	55.79	Lakshman Singh	INC	25,319	41.40	8,804	14.39
151	Mandal	Kalu Lal Gujar	BJP	35,535	51.49	Bhanwar Lal Jat	INC	20,619	29.88	14,916	21.61
152	Sahada	Ratan Lal Jat	JD	35,507	51.54	Rampal Upadhyaya	INC	31,419	45.61	4,088	5.93
153	Bhilwara	Banshi Lal Patwa	BJP	58,232	59.77	Ram Prasad Ladha	INC	32,675	33.54	25,557	26.23
154	Mandalgarh	Shiv Charan	INC	31,640	39.20	Ram Sawroop Gupta	BJP	31,394	38.89	246	0.31
155	Jahazpur	Shivji Ram	JD	28,989	42.07	Ratan Lal Tambi	INC	23,728	34.43	5,261	7.64
156	Shahpura (SC)	Bharu Lal Bairwa	BJP	27,665	45.88	Kanhiya Lal	INC	21,676	35.95	5,989	9.93
157	Banera	Devendra Singh	INC	24,025	35.63	Prakram Singh	IND	23,097	34.26	928	1.37
158	Asind	Laxmi Lal	INC	30,646	48.61	Vijayender Pal Singh	JD	29,805	47.28	841	1.33
159	Jaitaran	Surender Goel	BJP	17,993	25.95	Partap Singh	INC	16,416	23.67	1,577	2.28
160	Raipur	Hira Singh Chauhan	BJP	32,923	51.27	Sukh Lal Saincha	INC	26,120	40.68	6,803	10.59
161	Sojat	Laxmi Narain Dave	BJP	27,509	40.74	Pukhraj Kalani	INC	20,010	29.63	7,499	11.11
162	Kharchi	Khangar Singh Choudhary	BJP	35,378	54.22	Chakarvarti Singh	INC	27,408	42.01	7,970	12.21
163	Desuri (SC)	Achla Ram	BJP	35,241	65.22	Dinesh Dangi	INC	15,226	28.18	20,015	37.04
164	Pali	Pushpa Jain	BJP	45,555	51.23	Bheem Ram Bhati	INC	40,027	45.01	5,528	6.22
165	Sumerpur	Gulab Singh	BJP	23,161	33.20	Beena Kak	INC	22,887	32.80	274	0.40
166	Bali	Amrat Lal	IND	18,787	33.26	Jethu Singh	INC	18,604	32.93	183	0.33
167	Sirohi	Tara Bhandari	BJP	43,640	57.08	Rajender Gopaliya	INC	27,270	35.67	16,370	21.41
168	Pindwara Abu (ST)	Prabhoo Ram Garasia	BJP	30,845	51.04	Surma Ram Garasia	INC	20,087	33.24	10,758	17.80
169	Reodar (SC)	Tikam Chand Kant	BJP	24,582	43.87	Chhoga Ram Bakoliya	INC	22,693	40.50	1,889	3.37
170	Sanchore	Laxmi Chand Mehta	BJP	33,035	29.08	Hira Lal	INC	32,348	28.48	687	0.60
171	Raniwara	Ratna Ram Choudhary	INC	39,468	49.25	Arjun Singh Devra	BJP	33,080	41.28	6,388	7.97
172	Bhinmal	Prem Singh Dahiya	INC	27,446	32.42	Mahipal Singh	BJP	23,999	28.35	3,447	4.07
173	Jalore (SC)	Jogeshwar Garg	BJP	33,311	51.07	Ram Lal Meghwal	INC	27,827	42.66	5,484	8.41
174	Ahore	Gopal Singh	INC	21,520	32.26	Bhag Raj Choudhary	JD	19,753	29.61	1,767	2.65
175	Siwana (SC)	Hukama	BJP	31,866	57.06	Mota Ram	INC	18,044	32.31	13,822	24.75
176	Pachpadra	Champa Lal Bathiya	BJP	46,995	53.77	Amra Ram	INC	36,354	41.59	10,641	12.18
177	Barmer	Ganga Ram	JD	34,371	45.69	Hema Ram	INC	21,363	28.40	13,008	17.29
178	Gudamalani	Madan Kaur	JD	40,594	63.46	Chaina Ram	INC	17,067	26.68	23,527	36.78
179	Chohtan	Abdul Hadi	JD	43,840	53.56	Ganpat Singh	INC	33,299	40.68	10,541	12.88
180	Sheo	Amin Khan	INC	38,756	50.68	Hari Singh	JD	34,169	44.68	4,587	6.00
181	Jaisalmer	Jitendra Singh	JD	34,342	37.90	Gordhan Das	INC	32,279	35.63	2,063	2.27
182	Shergarh	Manohar Singh Inda	BJP	35,573	52.80	Khet Singh Rathor	INC	18,490	27.45	17,083	25.35
183	Jodhpur	Surya Kanta Vyas	BJP	39,543	59.04	Ahmed Bux Sindhi	INC	23,760	35.47	15,783	23.57
184	Sardarpura	Rajendra Gahlot	BJP	41,931	54.89	Man Singh Devra	INC	23,752	31.09	18,179	23.80
185	Sursagar (SC)	Mohan Meghwal	BJP	59,618	56.53	Narpat Ram Barvar	INC	43,486	41.23	16,132	15.30
186	Luni	Ram Singh Vishnoi	INC	39,549	50.21	Budha Ram	JD	27,455	34.86	12,094	15.35
187	Bilara	Mishri Lal Chodhary	JD	44,145	53.69	Ram Narayan Dudi	INC	33,306	40.50	10,839	13.19
188	Bhopalgarh	Parasram Maderna	INC	43,330	49.71	Narain Ram Bera	JD	40,556	46.53	2,774	3.18
189	Osian	Ram Narain Bishnoi	JD	32,484	48.84	Narender Singh	INC	32,405	48.72	79	0.12
190	Phalodi	Punam Chand Bishnoi	INC	52,861	51.41	Sher Singh	JD	41,771	40.63	11,090	10.78
191	Nagaur	Gulam Mustafa Khan	JD	22,570	28.67	Damodar Das Aacharya	INC	21,443	27.24	1,127	1.43
192	Jayal (SC)	Mohan Lal	JD	26,787	47.63	Jeth Mal	INC	20,036	35.63	6,751	12.00
193	Ladnu	Manohar Singh	IND	25,497	32.64	Harji Ram Burdk	JD	25,199	32.26	298	0.38
194	Deedwana	Ummed Singh	JD	34,501	40.65	Chaina Ram	IND	30,857	36.35	3,644	4.30
195	Nawan	Harish Chander	BJP	40,601	49.83	Rameshwar Lal	INC	37,840	46.44	2,761	3.39
196	Makrana	Birda Ram	INC	22,570	26.06	Bhanwar Lal Boravar	IND	21,684	25.03	886	1.03
197	Parbatsar (SC)	Mohan Lal	JD	36,348	50.11	Babu Lal	IND	22,209	30.62	14,139	19.49
198	Degana	Richhpal Singh	JD	53,034	61.94	Ram Raghu Nath	INC	30,705	35.86	22,329	26.08
199	Merta	Ram Karan	JD	34,068	38.53	Shiv Dan Singh	IND	29,432	33.28	4,636	5.25
200	Mundwa	Habibur Rahman	INC	36,404	46.40	Ram Dev	JD	34,732	44.27	1,672	2.13

== Bypolls ==
Year	Constituency	Reason for by-poll	Winning candidate	Party
1991	Deeg	Resignation of K Kaur	A. Singh	Indian National Congress
1991	Bamanwas	Resignation of K. L. Meena	H. Lal	Indian National Congress
1991	Niwai	Resignation of R. N. Berwa	K. Meghwal	Bharatiya Janata Party
1991	Mandalgarh	Resignation of S. C. Mathur	B. L. Joshi	Indian National Congress
Source:ECI

== See also ==
- List of constituencies of the Rajasthan Legislative Assembly
- 1990 elections in India
