= Indian Institute of Islamic Studies =

Islamic studies institute in New Delhi, India

The Indian Institute of Islamic Studies is an Islamic studies institute, in New Delhi, India. Established in 1963, by prominent Muslim leaders including Hakeem Abdul Hameed, who later founded the Jamia Hamdard university, the Institute entrusted to preserve the Islamic tradition and culture in India. In addition to this institute also promoting studies and research in Islam as well as comparative studies. It is the repository of many collections on Islam, mostly written in Persian and Arabic languages, and also publishes a quarterly journal, Studies in Islam

The institute was also instrumental in the funding of Delhi-based, India Islamic Cultural Centre (IICC) in 1984.
