= Indian National Congress (Jagjivan) =

- Abbreviation: INC(J)
- Founder: Jagjivan Ram
- Founded: 1981 (45 years ago)
- Dissolved: 1988 (38 years ago)
- Merged into: Janata Dal

Congress (Jagjivan) was a political party in India. It was formed in August 1981, after Jagjivan Ram resigned from the Indian National Congress (Urs).

Ram had rallied an All India Congress Committee (U) meeting of his own, expelling party leader Devraj Urs from the party. As a direct consequence Ram was expelled from Congress (U).

The party maintained a small presence in the Indian Parliament but dissolved in 1988, after Ram's death in 1986.
