= Political families of Haryana =

Political families of Haryana, India

This is the alphabetical categorised list of statewide, regional and local political families involved in the politics and various elections of Haryana state of India at state (Haryana Legislative Assembly) and national level (Lok Sabha).

== Critique of dynastic political clans of Haryana ==
=== Present status ===
==== Characteristics of political dynasties: ideology-less self-serving hegemony of caste and region based dynasties ====
The political dynasties of Haryana are not driven by the ideology, but by the goal of holding the power and keeping the rivals out. Dynastic politicians have unfair advantage from the start of their political career. The dynastic political clans of Haryana are often criticised for the infamous self-serving politics of the Aaya Ram Gaya Ram turncoats who notoriously engage in the frequent party switching, political horse trading, unholy political alliances, political corruption, political cronyism, nepotistic-dynastic rule which serves their own clan more than it serves their voters and people of Haryana they ought to serve.

==== Dynasties in Congress and BJP ====
Though dynasties exist across the left–right political spectrum of political continuum, the self-professed centrist Congress and regional parties use to be more dynastic than the right-wing BJP or the left-wing communists, but that distinction is fast fading as BJP also has large number of homegrown dynasts as well has inducted large number of opportunistic party-hopper dynasts from other parties.

In 2019 Lok Sabha elections, there were at least 8 dynasts grandchildren, great-grandsons and sons of ex-CMs of Haryana, all of them were the usual suspects, i.e. Lal trio clans, Hooda-Birender clan and Rao-Yadav clan. Of total 10 seats from Haryana, the highest number of dynasts candidates were from Congress 9 (2 from Hooda clan, Shruti Chaudhary from Bansi Lal clan, Bhavya Bishnoi from Bhajan Lal clan, Kumari Selja, Kuldeep Sharma, Tanwar), followed by 2 from Devi Lal clan (Digvijay and Arjun Chautala), and 2 from BJP (Bijender Singh and Rao Inderjit). The BJP won all the 10 seats in the election.

=== Consequences of dynastic politics in Haryana ===
==== Proliferation of dynasties keeps people poorer ====
A data based scientific empirical research, which studied the impact of dynastic politics on the level of poverty of the provinces, found a positive correlation between dynastic politics and poverty i.e. the higher proportion of dynastic politicians in power in a province leads to higher poverty rate. There is significant evidence that these political dynasties use their political dominance over their respective regions to enrich themselves, using methods such as graft or outright bribery of legislators. Even relatively richer provinces could not become truly richer due to the dynastic politics.

==== Dynasties' conflict-of-interest creates corruption ====
Since the political dynasties hold significant economic power and their interests are overrepresented due to dynastic politics, it leads to the conflicts of interests and corruption. As of December 2009, 120 (22%) of India's 542 parliament members were accused of various crimes under India's First Information Report procedure. Many of the biggest scandals since 2010 have involved high level government officials, including Cabinet Ministers and Chief Ministers, such as the 2010 Commonwealth Games scam (₹70,000 crore (US$7.3 billion)), the Adarsh Housing Society scam, the Coal Mining Scam (₹1.86 lakh crore (US$19 billion)), the Mining Scandal and the Cash for Vote scams. The industries most vulnerable to corruption as: government-run social development projects, infrastructure development & real estate projects, mining, aerospace & defence, and Power & Utilities (2013 EY and 2011 KPMG). India ranked at 78th place out of 180 in the 2018 Corruption Perception Index and more than 50% of Indians had at some point or another paid a bribe to a public official to get a job done (Transparency International, 2008).

The negative impact of dynasties on the economy and wealth of province can be explained by the "Carnegie Effect" named after the industrialist Andrew Carnegie who donated all his wealth for philanthropy to non-family members, because he believed the dynasts have less incentive of working hard if they are assured of inherited power, connections and wealth. Political dynasties prefer status quo and develop self-serving interests largely different from the interests of voters they ought to be serving. Dynastic candidates, being almost exclusively from the upper classes, are naturally biased towards defending their own vested interests.

==== Misuse of state resources by dynasties for self-promotion ====
In a blatant act of self-promotion by misusing state institutes, the Bhupinder Singh Hooda led Congress govt in Haryana, introduced a chapter titled "Haryana Ke Gaurav" (Pride of Haryana) in the curriculum of class V to teach students about the political dynasties in a glorified light i.e. highlighted only the positive aspects of dynast leaders related to top 5 prolific dynasties of the state, e.g. Devi Lal and Bansi Lal, Chotu Ram and Ranbir Singh Hooda, etc. Based on the recommendations by a committee that had members of NCERT and SCERT in 2016 this chapter was removed by the BJP government led by the Chief Minister Manohar Lal. It was replaced by a new chapter titled "Gaurav Gatha" (Glorious Legends), which replaced the dynast leaders with the freedom fighters non-dynast leaders of national stature, including the greats such as Bhagat Singh, Vallabhbhai Patel, Lala Lajpat Rai and Lokmanya Tilak to name a few. To reinforce their political image and lineage to gain unfair "instant recognition" for multiple generations, dynasts engage in wastage of government resources and taxpayer's money, for example erecting numerous statues of the dynast leaders, naming multiple institutes and schemes after the same dynastic leaders of own clan, etc.; this money could have been better spent on the welfare of poor and the development of the state. To reverse and prevent this, there have been demands for the "anti-dynasty laws" and the "anti-dynasties pro-martyrs institution naming policies" to specifically exclude the dynasts and politicians, and to include the martyrs and the non-political prominent achievers in the specific area.

To keep the rivals out of power and to prevent the rise of emerging challengers, the political dynasties often misuse state agencies, police, vigilance bureau, false cases with planted evidence to persecute and harass their rivals in each district and village in a psychopathic manner.

Psychopathic persecution of political challengers

"Why do we invest our lives in politics, Why do we endure the dust, heat, bumpy helicopters, ‘dhakka-mukki’ (push-and-shove), court cases, arrests, to get this thing called power? Is mein aisa kya current hai (what is this irresistible pull)? Not the money. After all, even after you made all your money, you couldn’t really enjoy it. In our politics, you can’t be seen to be rich, even your cars, homes and kurtas had to look modest. Even your families couldn’t be seen flaunting jewellery, or splurging. When you get power you do to the guy you defeated exactly what he did to you. Not even so much to him, but to his people. We know who his people are, in every district, every village. We send our police, vigilance bureau, whatever after them. For those we really want to target, we may even keep a kilo of illegal opium or a murder charge handy. When we hurt these people, they go running to their bosses and say, huzoor, bachao mujhe (sir, please save me). Then, their leader says he can’t, because he hasn’t got the power any more. The torture he suffers (jab woh tadapta hai), that is our fix. Tab dil mein jo thandak padti hai, uske liye 5 saal dhakke khaate hain (the incredible pleasure we get from our rivals’ helplessness to help his own is why we work so hard at our politics)."

— Om Prakash Chautala then Chief Minister of Haryana between 1998 and 2005 who was subsequently convicted and imprisoned for 10 years for a political corruption scam, as told to Shekhar Gupta editor-in-chief of "The Print", published in ThePrint on 31 August 2019.

==== Dynasties prevent the rise of talented non-dynasts ====
Dynastic politicians tend to be generally less capable compared to non-dynastic politicians, because of their reliance on dynastic connections rather than academic and professional competence for their position. Unethical practices of nepotism and cronyism have negative consequences because the truly qualified and talented people have to face injustices and it eventually leads to corruption and brain drains which creates the social discrimination. Research has found that the dynast members of parliament (MPs) are less likely to have served at the grassroots politics, such as panchayat elections, than the non-dynastic MPs. Political dynasties collude to maintain the status quo, by preventing the non-dynastic better-skilled more-capable challengers/candidates being elected to the power. This in turn leads to the bureaucratic inefficiencies and underdevelopment, the lack of accountability and transparency in governance, and the resistance to adoption of new progressive-transformative ideas needed for the faster-paced development.

==== Sustaining and perpetuating the dynasties ====
Rise of political dynasties caused by the creation of family-controlled self-serving despotic non-democratic parties in democracy which breed nepotistic parasitic patron-psychophants hegemony. Dynasties sustain and perpetuate their power by the collaboration of competing dynasties aimed at maintaining their mutual hegemony and preventing the rise of others as new political challengers. The collaborating dynasties do so by building strong friendly and family ties outside the politics (usually inter-marrying across rival parties) to sustain each other, while keeping the facade of being the political adversaries.

==== Decline and demolition of dynasties ====
Parties go in decline with the death of the chief patron, internal squabbling for power among the members of controlling-family, rise of new non-dynastic charismatic leaders, anti-dynasty disgust among the voters with the increased literacy rate in the country, rising aspirations of the politically aware non-dynastic masses and civil society. Dynasties can be reduced and eliminated by implementing the anti-dynasty laws, stringent conflict of interest laws, stringent laws for the transparency in governance and party operations, mandatory intra-party democracy law as a precondition for maintaining the ongoing registration of the party, laws limiting the number of terms for the elected representatives and party officials, laws limiting the number of simultaneous candidates from the same families, laws to enforce a cooling period between the generations of dynasties for the entry into politics, developing grassroot leadership, institutionalised mechanism for the progression of grassroot leaders into state and national politics e.g. mandatory for MLA and MP to have served at panchayat or municipal level, strengthening the institutionalised role of the civil society in the enforcing the accountability and transparency in governance.

== Statewide rampant dynasts ==
Five rampant and large dynasties over several generations have been prominent in Haryana's politics since the formation of Haryana in 1966, namely: the Lal Trio, the Hooda-Birender Singh clans, Pandit Bhagwat Dayal Sharma clan and Rao-Yadav clans.

=== Bhupinder Singh Hooda clan ===
Origin of this political dynasty is related to Matu Ram Hooda, an Arya Samajist. Matu Ram was one of the key members of the first Congress conference in Rohtak. Hooda's traditional sphere of influence originates from Rohtak and extends to Sonipat and Jhajjar.

- Ranbir Singh Hooda, MLA, MP in Lok Sabha & Rajya Sabha, Ex-Minister of Punjab & Haryana
- Inderjit Singh Hooda, son of Ranbir Singh, contested 1982 Haryana assembly election as INC candidate
- Bhupinder Singh Hooda, son of Ranbir Singh, Ex Chief Minister of Haryana, former President of Haryana Congress, currently the Leader of Opposition (Haryana)
- Deepender Singh Hooda, son of Bhupinder Singh, Former MP in Rajya Sabha (2020-2024) and Lok Sabha MP(2005-2019, 2024–Present).

=== Bhagwat Dayal Sharma clan of Haryana ===
- B. D. Sharma, ex-Chief Minister, Minister of Labour in Punjab, Punjab Congress president (1963–1966), Chief minister Haryana (1966–1967), Rajya Sabha member (1968–1974), Lok Sabha member (1977 from Karnal), Governor of Orissa and Madhya Pradesh from 1978 to 1984.
- Rajesh Sharma, elder son of Bhagwat Dayal Sharma, ex-Minister Labour and Employment, Sports and Youth Affairs from 1982 to 1987, 1991-1996 respectively.
- Mahadev Sharma, Younger son of B. D. Sharma ex-vice president INLD, currently member of Congress Haryana.

=== Lal trio of Haryana ===
The Lal trio in the politics of Haryana refers to three influential political leaders who have had a significant impact on the state's political landscape. The leaders are Devi Lal, Bansi Lal, and Bhajan Lal. All of the Lal trio started their politics from Congress party, became turncoats, often founding, merging, splitting and switching parties.

==== Bansi Lal clan ====
This clan, once dominant at the state level, is now declining and limited only to Bhiwani Lok Sabha and Tosham assembly seats.

- Bansi Lal, ex-Chief Minister Haryana.
- Ranbir Singh Mahendra, elder son of Bansi Lal, ex-MLA from Mundhal Khurd, ex-President of BCCI lost from Badhra assembly in 2009 and 2014.
- Sumitra Devi, Bansi Lal's daughter who contested 2014 Loharu assembly election against her sister's husband Sombir Singh which both lost.
- Sombir Singh Sheoran, Bansi Lal's son-in-law and husband of Bansi Lal's daughter Savita, ex INC MLA, contested and lost 2014 Loharu assembly election.
- Surender Singh, son of Bansi Lal, ex-Member of Parliament from Bhiwani.
- Kiran Choudhry, wife of Surender Singh, ex MP of Rajya Sabha from Haryana.
- Shruti Choudhry, Daughter of Surender Singh, Cabinet Minister of Haryana and former Member of Parliament from Bhiwani-Mahendragarh

==== Bhajan Lal clan ====
This clan, once dominant at the state level, is now declining and struggling to retain their traditional hold on Hisar Lok Sabha and Adampur assembly seats.

- Bhajan Lal Bishnoi, Former Chief Minister Haryana
- Jasma Devi, wife of Bhajan Lal, ex MLA (1987-1991)
- Chander Mohan Bishnoi, son of Bhajan Lal, Former Deputy Chief Minister of Haryana
- Kuldeep Bishnoi, son of Bhajan Lal, two time MP from Bhiwani and Hisar.
- Renuka Bishnoi, wife of Kuldeep Bishnoi, MLA from Adampur
- Bhavya Bishnoi, son of Kuldeep Bishnoi and Renuka Bishnoi, MLA from Adampur
- Dura Ram, nephew of Bhajan Lal and cousin of Kuldeep Bishnoi and Chander Mohan, was and MLA from Fatehabad.

==== Devi Lal's Chautala clan ====
This clan is originally from Rajasthan and not from Haryana. In the 19th century, Devi Lal's grandfather Teja Ram Sihag (belonging to the 'Sihag' clan of Jats, but that surname is generally not used) came from Bikaner in Rajasthan and settled in Teja Khera village of Sirsa district. Teja Ram had three sons: Deva Ram, Asha Ram and Hukam Ram. Asharam had two sons, Lekhram and Tara Chand. Lekhram had two sons, Sahib Ram and Devi Lal. Due to Devi Lal, the Zamindar family became a political dynasty.

Sahib Ram was the first politician from the family to be elected as MLA in 1938, under British rule. Fourteen years later, in 1952, Devi Lal followed in his footsteps, by becoming MLA. Devi Lal had four sons, namely Partap Singh, Om Prakash Chautala, Ranjit Singh and Jagdish Chander. Partap Singh was MLA in the 1960s, Ranjit Singh was a Congress MP, Om Prakash Chautala became Chief Minister, and Jagdish died young, before he could join politics.

Om Prakash Chautala had two sons, Ajay Singh Chautala and Abhay Singh Chautala. Both have been MLA and MP. Devi Lal's numerous grandsons, greatgrandsons and other family members are also in politics, such as Aditya Devilal, Dushyant Chautala and his brother Digvijay Singh Chautala as well as their cousin Arjun Singh Chautala. This clan, once dominant at the state level and now in decline due to divisions and internal family squabbling in the large clan, is struggling to revive their statewide hold while still retaining some pockets of influence in Hisar and predominantly Sirsa area.

- Sahib Ram Sihag, Devi Lal's elder brother, first politician from the family, Congress MLA from Hisar in 1938 and 1947.

- Ganpat Ram, son of Sahib Ram

- Kamalvir Singh, grandson of Sahib Ram and son of Ganpat Ram. He contested several times on a Congress party ticket for the state assembly from the Dabwali constituency.
- Amit Sihag (Chautala), great grandson of Devi Lal's Brother, Son of Kamalvir Singh. MLA from Dabwali (2019).

- Chaudhary Devi Lal, Former Deputy Prime Minister of India and two times Chief Minister of Haryana. He started from the Indian National Congress by first becoming an MLA in Haryana in 1952, later co-founded and split many parties, where he later founded the Indian National Lok Dal.

- Partap Singh, eldest son of Devi Lal, INLD MLA in the 1960s.

- Ravi Chautala, son of Partap Singh Chautala. His wife, Sunaina Singh Chautala, is General Secretary of the INLD party.
- Jitendra Chautala. Not involved in politics.

- Om Prakash Chautala, second son of Devi Lal, Former Chief Minister of Haryana and Former National President of the Indian National Lok Dal. He was convicted and served in prison due to a case of political corruption. He and his wife Smt. Snehlata Devi were blessed with two sons.

- Ajay Singh Chautala, elder son of Om Prakash Chautala. He was convicted and imprisoned for the political corruption along with his father, he later co-founded a split party from the Indian National Lok Dal called the Jannayak Janta Party.
- Naina Singh Chautala, wife of Ajay Singh Chautala, Former MLA from Dabwali.

- Dushyant Chautala, elder son of Ajay Singh Chautala and Naina Singh Chautala, Former MP from Hisar and former Deputy Chief Minister of Haryana. He also co-founded the Jannayak Janta Party alongside his father.
- Digvijay Singh Chautala, younger son of Ajay Singh Chautala and Naina Singh Chautala, contested and lost the 2019 Lok Sabha elections.

- Abhay Singh Chautala, younger son of Om Prakash Chautala, Former MLA from Ellenabad and National President of the Indian National Lok Dal.
- Kanta Singh Chautala, wife of Abhay Singh Chautala. She contested Zila Parishad poll in Sirsa, but lost to son of her brother-in-law Aditya Devilal Chautala.

- Karan Singh Chautala, elder son of Abhay Singh Chautala.
- Arjun Singh Chautala, younger son of Abhay Singh Chautala, MLA from Rania

- Ranjit Singh Chautala, third son of Devi Lal. Power Minister of Haryana

- Late Sandeep Chautala.
- Gagandeep Chautala. Works closely with his father in politics.

- Jagdish Chandra Chautala, fourth and youngest son of Devi Lal. He died at a young age, but left behind three sons to succeed him.

- Aditya Devilal Chautala, grandson of Devi Lal and son of Jagdish Chandra. Member of the INLD (formerly BJP). Defeated Kanta Singh Chautala, wife of his cousin brother Abhay Singh, and got elected to the Zila Parishad of Sirsa district. Now he is the MLA of Dabwali.
- Aniruddh Chautala
- Abhishek Chautala

=== Chhotu Ram clan ===
Chhotu Ram Ohlyan, was the founder of the Unionist Party and a Revenue Minister in Punjab govt., these branches are descended from or related to him. He had no son, his nephew Sri Chand became his political successor and his son-in-law Neki Ram (husband of Sir Chotu Ram's daughter and father of Birender Singh) became prominent politician in Jind area.

- Sri Chand Ohlyan, nephew of Chotu Ram, MLA and speaker of Haryana assembly in 1967.

==== Birender Singh/Sheokand clan ====
This clan is related to Chotu Ram.

- Neki Ram Sheokand, son-in-law of Chotu Ram had married the daughter of Chotu Ram, former MLA & Minister in the joint Haryana & Punjab Government.
- Chaudhary Birender Singh Sheokand, son of Neki Ram and grandson of Chottu Ram, 5 times MLA, 4 times MP, Union Minister for Steel, former President of Haryana Congress, nephew of Ranbir Singh Hooda and cousin of Bhupinder Singh Hooda
- Premlata Singh Sheokand, wife of Birender Singh, MLA Uchana Kalan.
- Brijendra Singh Sheokand, son of Birender and Premlata, nephew of Bhupinder Singh Hooda, MP in 2019 Lok Sabha.

=== Ahir clans of South Haryana ===
Ahir populated South Haryana has 11 assembly seats spread across 3 districts (Rewari, Gurugram and Mahendragarh) and 3 Lok Sabha seats, and politics of this region of various parties is prominent in by the turncoat-politician descendants of Tula Ram who often compete with each other in elections while otherwise remaining united in keeping new challengers out.

Following claim either direct descent or from the clan of Rao Tula Ram.

==== Ajay Yadav clan ====
This clan claims descent from Tula Ram. This clan is also related to the Lalu Prasad Yadav.

- Rao Abhey Singh, MLA
- Ajay Singh Yadav, son of Ahey Singh, 6 times MLA from Rewari, MP, union minister
- Chiranjeev Rao, son of Ajay Singh Yadav who is married to Lalu Prasad Yadav's daughter Anushka, foreary General Secretary of Haryana Congress, Congress-RJD Corrdinator for Bihar 2015 assembly polls,
- Abhimanyu Rao, paternal nephew of Ajay Singh Yadav and paternal grandson of Abhey Singh, convener of the AICC's OBC Department Indian National Congress Party.
- Aayushi Rao, wife of Abhimanyu Rao, sarpanch) of Saharanwas village in Rewari district

==== Birender Singh's Ahir clan ====
This clan became prominent due to Birender Singh, who served as the 2nd Chief Minister of Haryana. He is the great-grandson of Tula Ram.

- Balbir Singh, MLA in Punjab assembly from 1921 to 1941.
- Rao Birender Singh, Son of Balbir Singh, claims direct descent from Tula Ram, 2nd Chief Minister Haryana.
- Sumitra Devi, daughter of Balbir Singh and sister of Birender Singh, sister of Birender Singh, defeated Abhay Singh from Rewari in 1967. Contested lok sabha polls from Alwar under Vishal Haryana Party
- Shoe Raj Singh, son of Balbir Singh and brother of Birender, lost elections from Rewari to Abhay Singh in 1972.
- Rao Inderjit Singh, son of Birender Singh, 6 times MP from Gurgaon 4 times MLA and union Minister of State, turncoat from INC to BJP.
- Arti Rao daughter of Rao inderjeet singh - health minister Government of Haryana and mla from ateli 2024
- Rao Yadavendra Singh, son of Birender Singh and younger brother of Inderjit Singh, Ex-MLA from Kosli
- Ajit Singh, son of Birender Singh and younger brother of Inderjit Singh, lost to Ajay Singh Yadav in 1989 lok sabha elections.

==== Mohar Yadav clan ====
- Mohar Singh, was related to family of Tula Ram, Former MLA, MLC and CPS from Ahirwal in the Punjab Government.
- Mahveer Singh, Mohar Singh's son, 3 time Former MLA & Minister in the Haryana Government.
- Vijayveer Singh, Mohor Singh's son, Former MLA Sohna
- Narbir Singh, Mahabir Singh's son, Four time MLA & and four time Minister in the Haryana Government.
- Dan Singh, 2019 INC MLA is related to Narbir Singh as Dan Singh's son Akshat Singh is married Narbir's daughter.

== Sub-state/regional dynasts ==
These clans are prominent in the politics only in some burrows of the state, and the clan has contested elections from two or more districts.

=== Chiranji Lal-Kuldeep Sharma clan of Karnal ===
This clan is prominent in the politics of Karnal.

- Chiranji Lal Sharma, 4 times MP from Karnal.
- Kuldeep Sharma, son of Chiranji Lal Sharma and 2 times INC MLA from Teh-Ganaur in Sonipat district,

=== Bhadana clan of South Haryana ===
- Avtar Singh Bhadana, Current MLA from Mirapur Assembly, Uttar Pradesh, 4 Times MP from Faridabad, Former MP from Meerut and Former Minister in Haryana Cabinet
- Kartar Singh Bhadana, brother of Avtar Singh Bhadana, Former Cabinet Minister in Haryana Cabinet, former MLA from Samalkha(Haryana) and Khatauli, Uttar Pradesh

Manmohan bhadana, son of kartar singh bhadana, currently serving as MLA from samalkha

=== Dalbir-Selja subordinate clan of dalit constituencies ===
This clan is prominent in the politics of Sirsa and Ambala.

- Dalbir Singh, was an MLA, MP and union minister belonging to INC. He died in the year 1987 aged 61 years of age.
- Selja Kumari, is the daughter of Dalbir Singh, former MP and union minister from INC.

=== Phool Chand Mullana family ===
- Phool Chand Mullana – Former President, Haryana Pradesh Congress Committee, Cabinate Minister, Haryana.
  - Varun Chaudhary – Currently MP from Ambala, former MLA from Mulana; ( Son of Phool Chand )
  - Pooja Chaudhary – Current MLA from Mullana. (Wife of Varun)

=== Jindal clan of Hisar-Kurukshetra ===
This industrial clan, an example of industrialist-politicians nexus and conflict of interests, is prominent in the politics of Hisar and Kurukshetra Lok Sabha as well as Hisar assembly seats.

- Om Prakash Jindal, 3 times INC MLA from Hisar assembly and once power minister of Haryana was one of the richest persons in India.
- Savitri Jindal, wife of Om Prakash Jindal who served as an INC MLA from Hisar assembly and also been a minister in haryana govt, is the richest woman of India She switched over to BJP in March 2024.
- Naveen Jindal, son of Om Prakash Jindal and 2 times INC and current BJP MP from Kurukshetra, is also the chairman and managing director of Jindal Steel and Power Company. He switched over to BJP in 2024.

=== Rahim Khan Clan of Mewat ===
This clan plays a significant role in the politics of Mewat area and has participated in elections from all three assembly seats of the Nuh district (Nuh, Punahana, Ferozepur Jhirka). They also have immense influence in the Hathin area of the Palwal district and the Taoru area of the Nuh district. Their political involvement has even extended to the Faridabad Lok Sabha constituency region as well. The clan's patriarch, Rahim Khan, served as a Member of Parliament in the Lok Sabha from the Faridabad constituency. This clan originates from the Katpuri village of the Nuh district of Haryana.

- Rahim Khan, MP from Faridabad, Power Minister of Haryana and 3 time MLA.
- Sardar Khan, brother of Rahim Khan, served as Deputy Home Minister of Haryana in 1977.
- Habib Ur Rehman alias Nayab Sahab, son of Rahim Khan, served as independent MLA from Nuh in 2005.
- Mohammad Ilyas, son of Rahim Khan, two-time State Cabinet Minister, five time MLA, has won from all of the constituencies in the Nuh district (Nuh, Punahana, Ferozepur Jhirka). Also contested the 2004 Lok Sabha elections from Faridabad, came second and lost to Avtar Singh Bhadana.

=== Shankar Dayal Sharma clan ===
These political branches greatly benefited from their relationship with former Indian President Dr. Shankar Dayal Sharma. There are many more from his lineage in the national politics, only following branches are active in Haryana.

==== Tanwar-Maken clan ====
This branch of clan is prominent in INC politics of Sirsa.

- Lalit Maken, father of Avantika Maken and grand son-in-law of Dr. Shankar Dayal Sharma
- Ashok Tanwar, son-in-law of Lalit Maken, husband of Lalit's daughter Avantika Maken who is maternal grand daughter of former Indian President Dr. Shankar Dayal Sharma, Tanwar lost several elections from Sirsa and has been 1 time MP from Sirsa

=== Tayyab Husain Clan of Mewat ===
This clan became extremely influential due to Tayyab Husain, who served as a Member of Parliament in the Lok Sabha from Gurgaon and Faridabad, and holds the unique record of serving as a Minister in the undivided state of Punjab, Rajasthan and Haryana. This clan is prominent interstate level into the Mewat region of Rajasthan as well. Yasin Khan, the father of Tayyab Husain, was originally given the social leadership of Mewat and is said to be the first lawyer from the Mewat region. He has also been associated with prominent Indian political figures such as Sir Chhotu Ram and Mahatma Gandhi. This clan originates from the Rehna village of the Nuh district of Haryana.

- Yasin Khan, MLA in the Punjab Legislative Assembly for 30 years since 1926.
- Tayyab Husain, son of Yasin Khan, was an MP and MLA, Minister in the undivided state of Punjab, Rajasthan and Haryana.
- Hamid Hussain, son of Yasin Khan and brother of Tayyab Hussain, elected INLD MLA from Nuh in 2000.
- Zakir Hussain, son of Tayyab Hussain, Previously INLD MLA from the Nuh Constituency who switched to BJP.
- Zahida Khan, daughter of Tayyab Husain and sister of Zakir Hussain, several times INC MLA of Kaman constituency in mewat region of Rajasthan adjoining Haryana.
- Shahnaaz Khan, Zahida's daughter and Tayyab Husain granddaughter, a medical doctor and was elected sarpanch from village Garhazan in Rajasthan in Mewat region on Haryana-Rajasthan border.
- Haneef Khan, paternal grandfather of Shahnaaz Khan and father-in-law of Zahida Hussain, sarpanch for 55 years.
- Jalees Khan, son of Haneef Khan, Zahida Hussain's husband and father of Shahnaaz Khan, elected head of block panchayat.

== Local district-level dynasts ==
These clans hog the politics only in a certain district or assembly seat.

=== Saini's of Hisar ===
- Hari Singh Saini- Former minister Hari Singh Saini is a prominent political figure who has been active in various parties throughout his career. Notably, Saini has contested elections against the prominent leader Om Prakash Jindal demonstrating his significant political influence.
- Rekha Saini- Rekha Saini, daughter-in-law of Hari Singh Saini, is an active member of Bhartiya Janta Party

=== Kanda clan of Sirsa ===
This clan is prominent in the politics of Sirsa city.

- Murli Dhar Kanda, contested India's first general election on Jan Sangh ticket, father of Gopal Goyal Kanda.
- Gopal Goyal Kanda, son of Murli Dhar Kanda and 2019 MLA in Haryana.

=== Mann Chaudhary's clan of Gogdipur ===
This clan is prominent in the assemblies of Indri in Karnal and Pai in Kaithal.

- Ch. Randhir Singh Mann, leader of the unionist party.
- Janki Mann, Wife of Randhir Singh Mann, 1 time MLA from Indri.
- Ch. Surjit Singh Mann, Son of Randhir Singh Mann, 3 time MLA from Indri, Minister in Chaudhary Bansi Lal's cabinet.
- Ch. Randeep Singh Mann, Son of Surjit Singh Mann, lost MLA election.
- Tejinder Pal Mann, Nephew of Randhir Singh Mann, 2 time MLA from Pai.

=== Regional Meo clans of the Mewat region ===
These clans only have prominence in one or two assembly constituencies within or near the Nuh district area where there is a significant Meo population.

==== Ahmed clan of Nuh ====
This clan is specifically prominent the politics of the Nuh constituency and used to be prominent in the former Taoru constituency of the Nuh district.

- Kabir Ahmed was elected MLA twice.
- Khurshid Ahmed, son of Kabir Ahmed, was a minister in Haryana three times and 5-time MLA, won his last election in 1996.
- Aftab Ahmed, son of Khurshid Ahmed, had been INC MLA from Nuh and a minister in Haryana govt.

==== Jaleb Khan clan of Hathin ====
This clan is specifically prominent the politics of the Hathin constituency in the Palwal district.

- Jaleb Khan, MLA from Hathin and former CPS in Haryana Government.
- Mohammad Israil, Congress MLA candidate from Hathin in 2019, lost to Praveen Dagar.

==== Shakrulla-Naseem clan of Ferozepur Jhirka ====
This clan is prominent in the meo politics of Ferozepur Jhirka constituency in the Nuh district near the Haryana-Rajasthan border.

- Shakrulla Khan, 3 times MLA from Ferozepur Jhirka constituency.
- Naseem Ahmed, son of Shakrulla Khan, INLD MLA from Ferozepur Jhirka constituency who turned turncoat and joined BJP.

==== Azmat Khan clan of Ferozepur Jhirka and Punahana ====
This clan is prominent in the politics of Ferozepur Jhirka constituency and the Punahana constituency in the Nuh district. The clan's patriarch is Azmat Khan

- Azmat Khan, Former Lok Dal MLA from Ferozepur Jhirka in 1987.
- Azad Mohammad, First Muslim Deputy Speaker of the Haryana Legislative Assembly and MLA from the Ferozepur Jhirka constituency.
- Rahish Khan, son of Azmat Khan, former Independent MLA from Punahana constituency, Haryana Waqf Board Administrator, and Minister of State in Haryana.

=== Surjewala/ Nain clan of Jind-Kaithal areas ===
This clan is prominent in the politics of Jind-Kaithal-Narwana area in mid-north Haryana.

- Ch. Shamsher Singh Surjewala, 5 times MLA, 1 time MP, minister in Haryana govt, from INC
- Randeep Singh Surjewala, son of Ch. Samsher Singh Surjewala, 2 times MLA and one time minister in Haryana,
- Aditya Singh Surjewala, MLA from Kaithal and son of Randeep Singh Surjewala

=== Vinod Sharma clan of Ambala ===
This branch of clan is prominent in INC politics of Ambala.

- Venod Sharma, brother of Shyam Sunder Sharma who is married to the daughter of Shankar Dayal Sharma Venod Sharma: The man who could have been CM June 2016 | former INC MLA and Rajaya Sabha MP, been a turncoat with own party.
- Shakti Rani Sharma, wife of Venod Sharma, BJP MLA from Kalka.

=== Harpal Singh clan of Tohana ===
This clan is prominent in the politics of Tohana-Ratia-Fatehbad District.

- Harpal Singh, 7 times MLA, 3 time minister, Lok Sabha MP from Kurukshetra, two time Haryana Pradesh Congress Committee president.
- Paramvir Singh, Son of Harpal Singh, 3 time INC MLA, Ex Parliamentary Secretary, Ex Agriculture Minister.
- Randhir Singh, Son of Harpal Singh, INC District President Fatehabad.
- Dilsher Singh, Grandson of Harpal Singh, is also an active congress worker..

== See also ==
- Similar lists
  - Political families of India
  - List of political families
- Related topics
  - Politics of Haryana
  - Elections in Haryana
  - Electoral reform in India
- Related concepts
  - Crossing the floor
  - Cronyism
  - Horse trading
  - Party switching
  - Political corruption
  - Political nepotism
  - Turncoat
