= Nuh (city) =

- City
- Coordinates: 28.12°N 77.02°E
- Country: India
- State: Haryana
- District: Nuh

Government
  - Body: Municipal Council of Nuh
  - MLA: Aftab Ahmed (INC)

Area
  - Total: 1,860 km^{2} (720 sq mi)
- Elevation: 199 m (653 ft)

Population (2011)
  - Total: 10,767
  - Density: 5.79/km^{2} (15.0/sq mi)
- Demonym: Mewati

Languages
  - Official: Hindi, English
  - Spoken: Haryanvi, Mewati, Urdu, Hindi
- Time zone: UTC+5:30 (IST)
- ISO 3166 code: IN-HR
- Vehicle registration: HR-27
- Website: haryana.gov.in

Nuh (Hindi: [nũːɦ]; ISO: Nuṁḥ) is a city and administrative headquarters of the Nuh district, located in the state of Haryana within the National Capital Region of India.

== Geography ==
Nuh is located at 28.12°N 77.02°E. It lies on the National Highway 248 (NH 48), also known as the Gurgaon-Sohna-Alwar highway, about 45 kilometres (28 mi) from Gurgaon. Nuh has an average elevation of 199 metres (652 feet). It is nearly 70 km from New Delhi. It is located in the far southwest area of Haryana.

== History ==
The modern-day Nuh city lies within the historical Mewat region of India. During the Medieval era, Delhi Sultan Firuz Shah Tughlaq appointed Sonpar Pal, a Jadaun Rajput who converted to Islam and became Raja Nahar Khan, as the ruler of Mewat. Nahar Khan was from the historic Kotla village of Nuh, where he built the Kotla fort. He became the patriarch of the Khanzada Rajputs, a distinct ethnic group compared to the native Meos.

The reign of Nahar Khan led to a major change took place in the socio-political life of the region. In order to strengthen the economic base of their chiefdom, the Khanzadas put considerable pressure on the ethnic Meos and other tribal communities in the Kala Pahad region to give up their plundering activities and take up cultivation. In this process, the conversion of forest land into agricultural land appears to have been their first major initiative. By a large-scale deforestation drive, more and more areas were brought under cultivation by the Khanzadas

As a consequence of economic developments during the Mughal period, significant social changes occurred among the Meo tribes. These tribes gradually migrated from the hills to the plains, transforming into a sedentary peasantry. This process of peasantization, which began in the 14th century, continued well into the 19th century. The relocation to the plains and the transition to peasant life led to the establishment of new villages and towns (qasbahs) in the region, including the notable Nuh qasbah.

Some state that the Nuh qasbah got its name from the Islamic prophet, Nuh, or some elder, social head or patriarch named after him, however, this is not the case. The origin of the name comes from the Persian word namaka (meaning salt). During the Mughal period, the Nuh qasbah was notable for its production of salt and iron. Nuh qasbah was a renowned center for salt production. Peasants from 22 villages within the pargana of Kotla manufactured salt using well water and supplied it to nearby qasbas in Haryana and the Ganga-Yamuna Doab. The banjaras, or nomadic traders, played a crucial role in the salt trade, just as they did with other commodities. The Mughal state imposed a tax called hasil aghori on salt manufacturers.

Under British rule, the Nuh region came under the control of Bharatpur State. After the Revolts of 1857, the region came under the Gurgaon district of the Punjab Province. The colonial era also witnessed religious syncretism in ethnic Meos, the native ethnic group of the region, with festivals like Holi and Diwali being celebrated across religious lines.

Post-Indian independence, Mewat faced communal tensions during the Partition of India, leading to displacement and violence. Mahatma Gandhi intervened, urging Meos to remain in India, and efforts were made to resettle displaced populations. Prominent social reformers like Chaudhary Mohammad Yasin Khan played key roles in shaping the region's political landscape, leading to the emergence of influential political dynasties like the Tayyab Husain clan, Rahim Khan clan, and Ahmed clan. These dynasties continue to hold sway over the politics and culture of Mewat.

== Climate ==
The climate in Nuh is varied. The lowest temperature can reach 0 degrees Celsius, while the high temperature can go up to 45 degrees Celsius.

== Demographics ==
Religion in Nuh city (2011)
Religion	Percent
Islam	50.09%
Hinduism	49.10%
Other or not stated	0.81%

As of the 2001 India census, Nuh had a population of 11,038. Males constitute 45% of the population and females 47%. Nuh has an average literacy rate of 54%, lower than the national average of 59.5%: male literacy is 63%, and female literacy is 44%. In Nuh, 20% of the population is under 6 years of age. Nuh is a Muslim majority city

== Visitor attractions and monuments ==
The town assumed importance at the time of Bahadur Singh of Ghasera because of the trade in salt manufactured in neighbouring villages. To the west of the town is a masonry tank of red sandstone featuring a chhatri adorned with floral designs. The Dargah of Hazrat Sheikh Musa combines Muslim and Rajput forms of architecture and is about 2.5 kilometres (1.6 mi) from the town.

In 2018, five monuments were noted as state-protected monuments, including Ghasera fort, Chuhi Mal Ka Taalab, Old tehsil building in Nuh, Kotla mosque, and a group of monuments at Meoli. Various ancient monuments of historical importance are scattered in this region, including:

=== Ghasera Fort ===
The ruined Ghasera Fort, a state protected monument, lies at Ghasera village 14 kilometres (8.7 mi) from Nuh city on Nun-Sohna road. that was ruled by Bahadur Singh Bargujar, a Rajput chief of 11 villages, he was killed in 1753 by the famous Jat king Surajmal of Bharatpur State after Jats besieged and ran over the Ghasera fort, after which Jats turned to Delhi by defeating Mughal Emperor Ahmad Shah Bahadur and occupied the Red Fort there in 1754 CE.

=== Nalhshwar Mahadev temple and Pandava Reservoir ===
The Nalhar Pandava Reservoir and Nalhshwar Mahadev Temple (Nalhar Shiv temple) are located 2 kilometres (1.2 mi) from Nuh city within the U-shaped Nalhar valley surrounded by several picturesque peaks near Nalhar village in the foothills of Nalhar hills of the Aravalli Range. It can be reached by the Nalhar road from Nuh city through a large ceremonial Hindu religious gate short distance from the temple. There is also a natural reservoir at base of Kadamb tree higher up in the Nalhar hill, which can be reached by climbing 250 paved and iron stairsteps behind the Nalhar Shiva Temple. According to the popular oral tradition, Pandavas stayed here, prayed to the god Shiva and drank water from this reservoir during a visit in their 14 years long exile. Shaheed Hasan Khan Mewati Government Medical College is located nearby. View from the top of Nalhar hill is the best.

Swami Gyan Giri found the temple in ruins. He restored it with the help of the local villagers and installed a natural lingam here which has the images of Aum, Shiva, Ganesha, Ganges, Janau and Naga. The temple is now managed by the Shri Shiv Rudra Jan Kalyan Sanstha headquartered in Mojowal near Nangal Dam. A large fair and bhandara (langar) is held on Maha Shivaratri.

=== Kotla Fort, Kotla mosque and tomb of Bahadur Khan Nahar ===
The Kotla Fort and Tomb of Raja Nahar Khan in the Kotla Mosque are 6.5 kilometres (4.0 mi) from Nuh city in the Kotla village. Square-shaped Kotla mosque (dating back to 1392-1400 CE) on a plinth, with grey quartzite tomb and red carved sandstone jalis has inscription on the ruined gateway, was notified as a state protected monument in June 2018.

=== Nuh System of Lakes ===
Nuh System of Lakes, a collection of several lakes lying in each other's vicinity, includes the permanent swamp of Khalilpur lake 1,500 acres (610 ha) in size which gets flooded during rains, lies north-west of Nuh around Khalilpur and Indari villages on Delhi Western Peripheral Expressway, permanent swamp with standing water of Chandaini lake 1,500 acres (610 ha) in size which lies 10 kilometres (6.2 mi) west of Khalilpur village, Sangil-Ujina lake is not a clearly defined basin of the lake as it carried only the overflow water in the rainy season from Khalilpur lake and other lakes, and Kotla Dahar lake at the foothills of Aravalli Range is the largest lake which is 5 kilometres (3.1 mi) broad and 4 kilometres (2.5 mi) long and lies across Nuh and Ferozpur Jhirka tehsils. Through a system of bunds and artificial drains the lakes of Khalilpur, Chandaini, and Kotla Dahar are drained by November to make the land available for cultivation.

In 2018, the Haryana government released INR82 crore (820 million) to rejuvenate Kotla Lake and other lakes in the Nuh system of lakes, which will recharge the ground water and irrigate 27,000 acres of farm land.

== Villages ==
- Adbar
- Akera
- Alawalpur
- Alduka
- Atta
- Babupur Nuh
- Badhelaki
- Badka Alimudin
- Bai
- Bainsi
- Bajarka
- Bajhera
- Baroji
- Barota
- Barwa
- Basai
- Bhatka
- Bhirawati
- Bhopawali
- Birsika
- Biwan
- Chandeni
- Chhachera
- Chhapera
- Chhapera
- Dehana
- Devla Nagli
- Dhanduka
- Dhenkli
- Dhir Dhaunka
- Dubalu
- Dundaheri
- Ferozepur Namak
- Gajarpur
- Gangauli
- Gehbar
- Ghasera
- Golpuri
- Hassanpur Sohna
- Hilalpur
- Hiranthla
- Hussainpur
- Indri
- Jaisinghpur
- Jajuka
- Jakohpur
- Jogipur
- Kairaka
- Kalanjar
- Kaliaka
- Kanwarsika
- Karamchandpu
- Khalilpur
- Khanpur
- Kherla
- Kherli Dausa
- Kherli Kankar
- Khor
- Khori Nuh
- Kira
- Kiranj
- Kontalka
- Kotla
- Kurali Sohna
- Kurthla
- Mahwan
- Mailawas
- Malab
- Manaki
- Manuwas
- Maraula
- Marora
- Meoli
- Mohmmadpur Nuh
- Murad Bas
- Nalhar
- Naushera
- Nizampur Nuh
- Nuh (MC)
- Palla
- Palri
- Qutabgarh
- Rahuka
- Raipuri
- Raisika
- Rampur
- Rehna
- Rethora
- Rewasan
- Rojka
- Rupaheri
- Sadain
- Salaheri
- Salamba
- Sangel
- Satputiaka
- Shahpur Nagli
- Sherpur Kalaheri
- Sonkh
- Sudaka
- Tain
- Tajpur
- Tapkan
- Tarakpur
- Thekarka
- Udaka
- Ujina
- Uleta
- Untka

== Nearby cities and towns ==
- Sohna (20 km) north
- Taoru (11 km) west
- Palwal (35 km) east
- Pinangwan (28 km) south east
- Punahana (41 km) south east
- Gurgaon (45 km) north
- Ferozepur Jhirka (37 km) south
- Faridabad (57 km) north east
- Delhi (75 km) north east
- Hodal (40 km) south east
- Narnaul (106 km) west
- Rewari (52 km) west
- Tijara (45 km) south west
- Hathin ( 25 km) east
- Tapukara ( 26 km) west

== See also ==
- 2023 Haryana riots
