= Mohammad Ilyas (politician) =

Indian politician

Chaudhary Mohammad Ilyas

Member of the Haryana Legislative Assembly
- Incumbent
- Assumed office 28 October 2019
- Preceded by: Rahish Khan
- Constituency: Punahana

Minister of State for Power, Government of Haryana
- In office 21 March 1991 – 11 May 1996
- Additional Ministry and Departments: Irrigation

Minister of State for Animal Husbandry, Government of Haryana
- In office 3 March 2000 – 5 March 2005
- Ministry and Departments: Fisheries; Dairy Development; Waqf Board

Member of the Haryana Legislative Assembly
- In office 28 October 2009 – 20 October 2014
- Preceded by: Constituency established
- Succeeded by: Rahish Khan
- Constituency: Punahana

Member of the Haryana Legislative Assembly
- In office 9 March 2000 – 8 March 2005
- Preceded by: Azad Mohammad
- Succeeded by: Azad Mohammad
- Constituency: Ferozepur Jhirka

Member of the Haryana Legislative Assembly
- In office 9 July 1991 – 10 May 1996
- Preceded by: Hassan Mohammad
- Succeeded by: Khurshid Ahmed
- Constituency: Nuh

Personal details
- Born: 1 April 1954 (age 72) Punhana, Punjab, India (present-day Haryana, India)
- Party: Indian National Congress (2019 - present) (1989 - 1996)
- Other political affiliations: Lokdal (1987 - 1989), Indian National Lok Dal (2000 - 2018), Jannayak Janta Party (2018 - 2019)
- Relations: Rahim Khan family
- Parent: Chaudhary Rahim Khan (father)
- Education: Jamia Millia Islamia

Mohammad Ilyas (born 1 April 1954) is an Indian politician who is a current member of the Haryana Legislative Assembly from the Punahana constituency in the Nuh district of Haryana.

He has been elected as a Member of Legislative Assembly five times and has served as a Minister of State twice in the Government of Haryana.

He re-contested and won the 2024 Haryana Legislative Assembly election under the Indian National Congress with a margin of 31,916 votes.

== Early life ==
Mohammad Ilyas was born to Chaudhary Rahim Khan in the village of Sultanpur-Punahana on 1 April 1954. He has three brothers and four sisters. His father was elected a Member of Parliament in the Lok Sabha from Faridabad constituency in 1984 till his death on 18 December 1987. His father was also elected as Member of the Haryana Legislative Assembly three times, Firstly in 1967 and secondly 1972 and in last elected in 1982 from Nuh constituency. His father served as minister twice in Government of Haryana. His uncle, Chaudhary Sardar Khan, served as the Minister of State for Home Affairs of Haryana.

His younger brother, Habib Ur Rehman, has served as an independent Member of the Haryana Legislative Assembly from the Nuh constituency.

== Political career ==
Mohammad Ilyas is a member of the Rahim Khan political dynasty of Haryana, which has immense influence in the Nuh district (Mewat region) of Haryana. Ilyas is a senior leader and the longest serving legislator from the region.

He first entered electoral politics in 1987, after the death of his father, contesting from the Nuh constituency under the banner of the Lok Dal (LKD), though he was unsuccessful. In a 1989 by-election, he ran as a candidate for the Indian National Congress but was again defeated. His first electoral victory came in 1991, where he served as the Minister of State for Power and Irrigation under the Bhajan Lal's Congress government.

In 1996, running as an independent, he again faced defeat. Ilyas achieved a significant win in 2000, securing the Ferozepur Jhirka seat as a candidate of the Indian National Lok Dal (INLD), where he served as the Minister of State for Animal Husbandry under Om Prakash Chautala's fifth ministry.

However, he was defeated in the 2005 election before winning the Punahana seat in 2009. After another loss in 2014, Ilyas made a successful comeback in 2019, once again winning under the Indian National Congress. He also contested an election for parliamentary seat of the Faridabad constituency in 2004 and lost the election to Avtar Singh Bhadana with a margin of 1,51,929 votes.

In the 2024 Haryana Legislative Assembly election, Ilyas retained his seat and won from the Punahana constituency with a victory margin of 31,916 votes.

== Personal life ==
He is married to Anwari Begum and has three sons, Noorul Hassan and Javed Khan, Yaqoom Khan and three daughters. He has Bachelor of Arts (BA) degree from Jamia Millia Islamia.

== Positions held ==
=== Legislative Assembly Terms ===
#	From	To	Position	Party
1.	1991	1996	Member of Legislative Assembly from Nuh (1st term)	INC
2.	2000	2005	Member of Legislative Assembly from Ferozeopur Jhirka (2nd term)	INLD
3.	2009	2014	Member of Legislative Assembly from Punhana (3rd term)	INLD
4.	2019	2024	Member of Legislative Assembly from Punhana (4th term)	INC
5.	2024	Incumbent	Member of Legislative Assembly from Punhana (5th term)	INC

=== Haryana Government ===
- Minister of State for Power and Irrigation from 1991 to 1996.
- Minister of State for Animal Husbandry, Fisheries, Dairy Development, and Waqf Board from 2000 to 2005

=== Other Notable Positions ===
- State Vice-President of the Indian National Lok Dal (INLD) in Haryana from 2006 to 2008.

== Electoral performance ==
=== Legislative Assembly Elections ===
Year	Party	Constituency Name	Result	Votes gained	Vote share	Margin
1987	LKD	Nuh	Lost	15,773	24.92%	27,970
1989 (by-election)	INC	Nuh	Lost	14,206	15.28%	18,523
1991	INC	Nuh	Won	17,274	28.47%	4,243
1996	IND	Nuh	Lost	7,379	10.98%	13,022
2000	INLD	Ferozepur Jhirka	Won	44,288	50.32%	17,560
2005	INLD	Ferozepur Jhirka	Lost	33,372	32.45%	1,723
2009	INLD	Punahana	Won	18,865	23.22%	2,688
2014	INLD	Punahana	Lost	31,140	29.56%	3,141
2019	INC	Punahana	Won	35,092	28.76%	816
2024	INC	Punahana	Won	85,300	58.31%	31,916

=== 2004 Lok Sabha Election ===
2004 Indian general elections: Faridabad
Party	Candidate	Votes	%	±%
INC	Avtar Singh Bhadana	357,284	42.2	New
INLD	Mohammad Ilyas	2,05,355	24.3	New
BJP	Ramchander Bainda	1,71,714	20.3	
BSP	Haji Abdul Malik	71,459	8.4	
Haryana Vikas Party	Devender Bhadana	13,042	1.5	
Majority		1,51,929	17.9	New
Turnout		8,44,718	56.66	42.2
INC hold		Swing		

== See also ==
- Chaudhary Rahim Khan
- Habib Ur Rehman
- Punahana Assembly constituency
