= Chaudhary Rahim Khan =

Indian politician (1923–1987)

- चौधरी रहीम खां
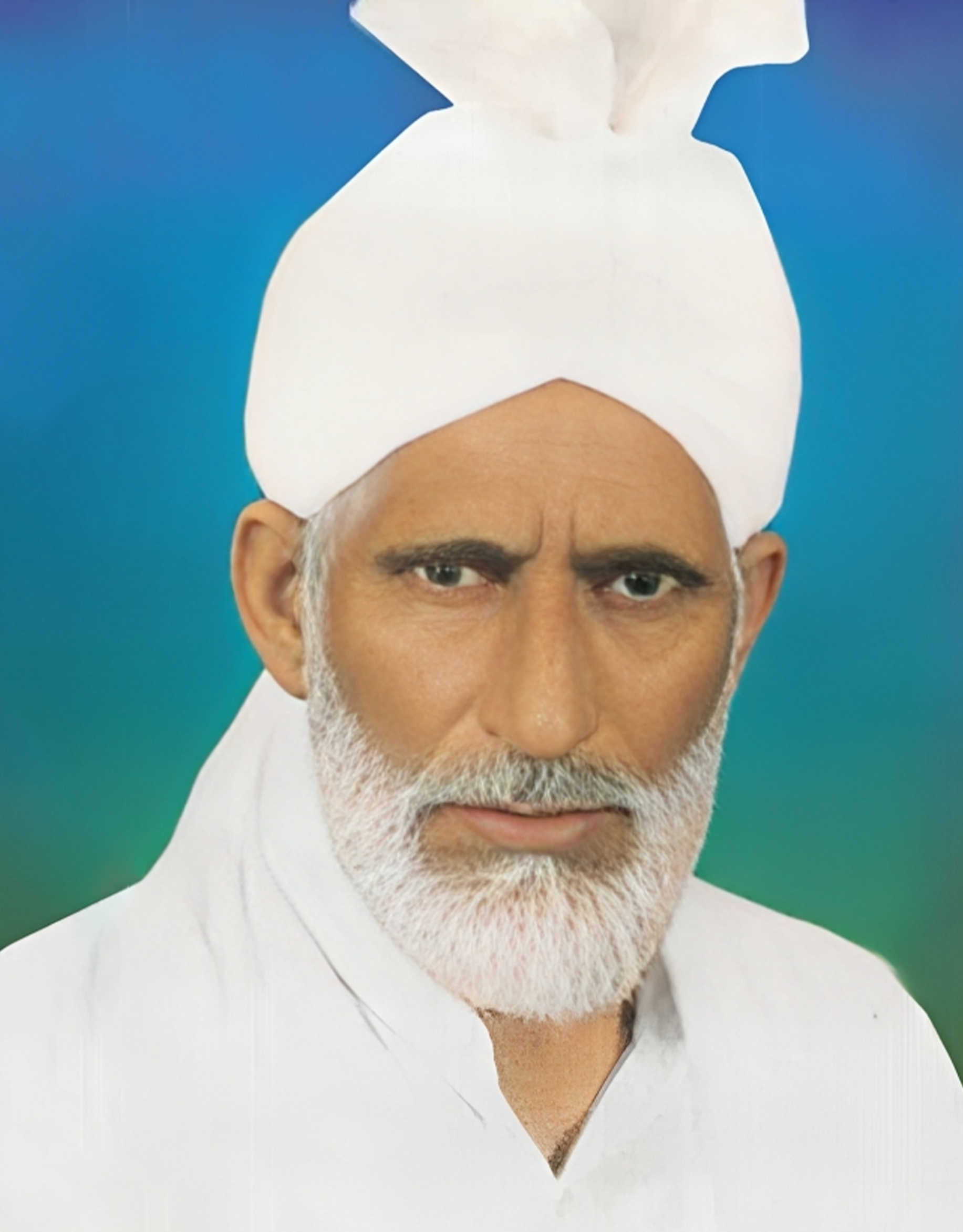
- Official portrait, 1984

Member of Parliament, Lok Sabha
- In office 31 December 1984 – 18 December 1987
- Preceded by: Tayyab Husain
- Succeeded by: Khurshid Ahmed
- Constituency: Faridabad

Minister of Power, Government of Haryana
- In office 23 May 1982 – 31 December 1984
- Additional Ministry and Departments: Irrigation; Waqf; Fisheries

Minister of State, Government of Haryana
- In office 24 March 1967 – 12 May 1968
- Ministry and Departments: Technical Education; Waqf

Member of the Haryana Legislative Assembly
- In office 23 May 1982 – 31 December 1984
- Preceded by: Sardar Khan
- Constituency: Nuh
- In office 11 March 1972 – 8 August 1974 (overturned)
- Preceded by: Khurshid Ahmed
- Constituency: Nuh
- In office 21 February 1967 – 12 May 1968
- Preceded by: Constituency established
- Constituency: Nuh

Personal details
- Born: 1 February 1923 Punhana, Punjab Province, British India (present-day Haryana, India)
- Died: 18 December 1987 (aged 64) New Delhi, India
- Party: Indian National Congress
- Children: 7, including Habib Ur Rehman (son), Mohammad Ilyas (son)
- Relatives: Rahim Khan family

Military service
- Allegiance: British India
- Branch/service: British Indian Army
- Years of service: 1941–1945
- Rank: Havildar
- Unit: 2 Punjab
- Battles/wars: World War II; Burma campaign

Chaudhary Rahim Khan (pronounced [rəɦiːm xãː]; 1 February 1923 – 18 December 1987) was an Indian politician, who served as a Member of Parliament representing the Faridabad constituency in the Lok Sabha, the lower house of the Indian Parliament. He died before he was to complete his term as Member of Parliament. He served as the Minister of Power and Irrigation, Waqf, and Fisheries in the Government of Haryana and was also elected as a Member of the Haryana Legislative Assembly three times.

== Early life and background ==
Chaudhary Rahim Khan was born to Shri Nawaz Khan on 1 February 1923. He was born in the village of Sultanpur-Punahana in the Punjab Province (modern day Haryana) of British India. He was an ethnic Meo. He was an agriculturist as well as a political and social worker. He had served formerly as a member of the armed forces of India as a Havildar (equivalent to a sergeant), where he was rendered overseas in the Burma Campaign during World War II. He was also awarded a war medal for his service.

He married Shrimati Budho and had 3 sons and 4 daughters. He is the patriarch of the Rahim Khan Clan, one of the most prominent political dynasties in the Mewat region of Haryana. Two of his notable sons are Chaudhary Habib Ur Rehman and Chaudhary Mohammad Ilyas, both of whom inherited his political legacy.

His brother Chaudhary Sardar Khan served as a Member of Legislative Assembly from the Nuh constituency and worked as the Minister of State for Home Affairs in the Government of Haryana (1977–1982).

== Political career ==
Chaudhary Rahim Khan started his political career as the Sarpanch from the Gram Panchayat of Sultanpur-Punahana in 1953. He was later elected as the Panchayat Samiti Chairman of Punahana in 1965. Following this, in 1967, he contested and won the first-ever Legislative Assembly Seat from the Nuh constituency, following the creation of Haryana State from Punjab in 1966. In this term he was appointed as the Minister of State for Technical Education and Waqf in the Government of Haryana.

Khan (center) attending a meeting of Indian National Congress members with Prime Minister Rajiv Gandhi (far right) and P. V. Narasimha Rao (second from right) during the 8th Lok Sabha, circa 1984-1987.

He was re-elected in 1972 and served his term till 1974 as his win was rendered officially invalid by the Supreme Court of India. In 1974, however, his brother, Chaudhary Sardar Khan, was elected and assumed his place. In 1982, he was elected to his final term in Haryana's Legislative Assembly, which lasted until 1984. During this time, he served as Haryana's Minister for Irrigation and Power, Waqf, and Fisheries.He then won the 1984 Lok Sabha Election from the Faridabad Lok Sabha constituency by a margin of 1,34,371 votes over the previous seat holder Tayyab Husain, receiving 53.1% of the total votes cast in the constituency that year. This was a momentous victory for Shri Rahim Khan, and it cemented his popularity among the people of Faridabad.

It is also reported that the last Nawab of Pataudi, Mansoor Ali Khan, celebrated Chaudhary Rahim Khan on his historic victory against Husain with an elephant ride. Chaudhary Rahim Khan is also said to have a close friendship and political relationship with the Former Prime Minister of India, Rajiv Gandhi.

He later died before he was able to complete his term as Member of Parliament in the Lok Sabha. Then Governor of Haryana S.M.H Burney, Devi Lal, Bansi Lal, Bhajan Lal all expressed their grief on the passing of Khan. In 1987, Rajiv Gandhi also attended his funeral in the village of Sultanpur-Punahana.

== Positions held ==
=== Legislative and Parliamentary service ===
#	From	To	Position	Party
1.	1967	1968	Member of Legislative Assembly from Nuh (1st term)	IND
2.	1972	1974	Member of Legislative Assembly from Nuh (2nd term)	IND
3.	1982	1984	Member of Legislative Assembly from Nuh (3rd term)	IND
4.	1984	1987	Member of Parliament in the 8th Lok Sabha from Faridabad	INC

=== Government of Haryana ===
- Minister of State for Technical Education, and Waqf (1967-1968) (1st Legislative Assembly Term)
- Minister of Power and Irrigation, Waqf, and Fisheries (1982-1984) (3rd Legislative Assembly Term)

=== Key leadership roles ===
- President of the All India Meo Sabha (1967-1987)
- President of All Mewat, All India Education and Development Society, Punahana (1967)
- President of the Congress Committee Mandal, Bisru, Pinangawan (till March 1967)
- Chairman of the Panchayat Samiti of Punahana (1965–1967)
- Sarpanch of Sultanpur-Punahana's Gram Panchayat (1953–1967)

=== Committee memberships and advisory roles ===
- Chairman of the Mewat Cooperative Marketing Society (1961–1962)
- Director of District Wholesale Cooperative Marketing Society, Gurgaon (1963–1967)
- Manager of Yasin Khan Meo High School, Nuh (1967)
- Member of Mewat Education Board (1967)
- President of Employees Provident Fund Union, Haryana Regional Office, N.l.T. Faridabad (1967)
- Administrator of Haryana Cooperative Marketing and Supply Federation (1978–1979)
- Member of the Sub-Divisional Advisory Committee and District Advisory Committee
- Member of the Angling and Aquatic Conservation Society of India, Badkhal, Faridabad (1967)
- Member of the Punjab Waqf Board, Ambala Cantt (1978–1981)
- Member of the Surplus Committee, Sub-Division of Ferozepur Jhirka (1978–1984)
- Member of the District Red Cross Society, Gurgaon District (1981)
- Member of the Airman and Soldier Board, Gurgaon District (1980)

== Political and social views ==
=== Development of the Mewat region ===
Chaudhary Rahim Khan with then Prime Minister of India, Rajiv Gandhi, and a congregation of the Meo community, circa 1984–1987.

Chaudhary Rahim Khan was the first politician to make the demand for a University in the Mewat region of India. Khan had welcomed the former Prime Minister of India, Rajiv Gandhi, to the Saumka village of Kaman, Rajasthan. This is where he presented a memorandum to the Prime Minister on behalf of the Meo community. In this memorandum, he mentioned nine important demands for removing the backwardness of the Mewat region, with the main ones being:

- Mewat University
- Establishment of Meo battalions and companies for easier employment of the people of Mewat in the police and military.
- An Indian Institute of Technology (IIT) in the Mewat region and seats should be reserved for the people of Mewat.
- Establishment of small and large factories for the employment of youth in the Mewat region.
- Establishment of Mewat Development Board in Rajasthan, similar to Haryana.
- Railway line connecting Alwar-Palwal & Rewari-Hodal.
- Settlement of the pending cases of the land of Meos which were snatched during the partition of India.
- Declaration of ethnic Meos as a part of the Scheduled Tribes designation as per Article 341 and Article 342 of the Indian constitution.

Rajiv Gandhi had assured that he would fulfill these demands. Chaudhary Rahim Khan had also made repeated demands for these issues in the Lok Sabha, however, most of these issues have not been resolved till this day. Mewat Development Board was later established in Rajasthan, similar to Haryana.

==== New Railway Lines in the Mewat region ====
In the 6th session of the 8th Lok Sabha session, Chaudhary Rahim Khan inquired about the government's plans to construct new railway lines in the Mewat region, which includes the districts of Alwar, Gurgaon, Faridabad, and Bharatpur in Haryana and Rajasthan.

The Minister of State (Independent Charge) of Railways, Madhavrao Scindia, provided a response, stating that the construction of a rail line between Mathura and Alwar was already underway. Additionally, a survey was being conducted for a rail line that would bypass Delhi, connecting Khurja and Rewari. This survey was intended to assess the operational and financial implications of the proposed link. The Minister's response indicated that while there were ongoing projects and planning efforts related to railway expansion in the region, specific details regarding new railway lines in all the mentioned districts were not fully addressed at that time.

On 15 February 2021, The Government of India passed the budget for the Gurgaon-Nuh-Alwar railway lines as proposed by Chaudhary Rahim Khan.

=== Meo Upliftment ===
Chaudhary Rahim Khan was a strong proponent the ideology of regionalism and Meo upliftment, an ethnic group originitating from the historical region of Mewat. Chaudhary Rahim Khan was the founder and president of the All India Meo Sabha, which was responsible for uniting ethnic Meos that were scattered across Haryana, Rajasthan, Delhi, Madhya Pradesh, Maharashtra and Uttar Pradesh, post independence. He would often hold All India Meo Sabha committees and initiative programmes alongside other Indian Members of Parliament for the development of the regions where ethnic Meos were scattered post-independence, raising awareness about the ethnic group and the historical region.

He made demands for the recognition of the ethnic Meos as part of the Scheduled Tribes in India and granting them reservations accordingly due to their economically and educationally disadvantaged status in Indian society.

He has also written the book "Writing the History of Meos" to preserve the culture of ethnic Meos.

=== Indian Union Budget 1986-87 ===
Chaudhary Rahim Khan had supported the Indian general budget of 1986-87. He praised the budget as progressive and beneficial for the country's future, commending Prime Minister Rajiv Gandhi and the Finance Minister for addressing the needs of the poor, scheduled tribes, and backward classes.

In his speech, Khan also recited two Urdu verses to underline his points. The first verse was:

"Khudaa Ne Aajtak us Koum ki haalat nahin badli, Na Ho jisko Akal Apne Ap Apnee Haalat Badalne ki."

This translates to, "God has never changed the condition of those who do not have the wisdom to change their own condition." He used this verse to criticize the opposition for being defeated and demoralized, implying that they were not taking responsibility for improving their own situation.

"Na Samjhoge A- Hindostan Walo to mit jaoge, Tumhari Dastan Tak Bhi Nahin Hogi Dastanon Main."

This translates to, "If you do not understand, O people of India, you will be wiped out, and your story will not even be among the tales told." This verse was used to caution the opposition about the consequences of not taking their responsibilities seriously.

Additionally, Khan emphasized the importance of agriculture, describing it as the foundation of India's economy. He highlighted the disparity between the value of farm produce and the benefits received by farmers, advocating for a reduction in the costs of agricultural machinery and better support for the farming community. Khan also addressed rural development, noting the lack of basic amenities such as electricity, water supply, and sewerage in villages compared to urban areas. He called for improvements in these areas to reduce the urban-rural divide.

Furthermore, Khan spoke about the issue of corruption, suggesting that loans and permits should be made more accessible to ordinary citizens, particularly unemployed youth. He also underscored the need for uniform educational standards across urban and rural areas to prevent further social stratification.

== Controversies ==
=== Rahim Khan vs Khurshid Ahmed on 8 August 1974 ===
==== High Court judgement ====
When Chaudhary Rahim Khan was elected for his second term in Haryana's Legislative Assembly in 1972, he defeated Khurshid Ahmed, who was a sitting minister at that time. Following this defeat, Khurshid Ahmed filed a case in the Punjab and Haryana High Court against Chaudhary Rahim Khan and challenged the election on various grounds of corrupt practices.

Chaudhary Rahim Khan was accused of the following under the Representation of the People Act, 1951:

- Bribery (Section 123(1)): Khurshid Ahmed alleged that Chaudhary Rahim Khan gave a vehicle to another candidate with the assurance that he would repay the expenses spent in using it for the election campaign. This accusation, however, was not established since there was no evidence to indicate that financial help was supplied to convince the candidate not to withdraw from the race.
- Appeal to Faith (Section 123(3)): Chaudhary Rahim Khan and his supporters were accused of delivering speeches that appealed to Muslim voters to vote for Shri Rahim Khan because he was a "true Muslim" whilst labelling Khurshid Ahmed as a non-believer. Chaudhary Rahim Khan was booked under this section as this was considered a corrupt practice under Section 123(3).
- Character Assassination (Section 123(4)): Khurshid Ahmed Chaudhary alleged that Chaudhary Rahim Khan had distributed handbills containing false allegations against Khurshid Ahmed, including charges of womanising and forcing Muslims to eat pork, and threatening divine displeasure if voters elected Khurshid Ahmed Chaudhary. These allegations were considered a corrupt practice under Section 123(4).

The distribution of damaging handbills was crucial evidence in the case. The court found acceptable, direct, and circumstantial testimony that the handbills were distributed with the knowledge and consent of Chaudhary Rahim Khan, which led to the finding of corrupt practices. Hence, Chaudhary Rahim Khan was booked under sections 123(3) and (4) of the Representation of the People Act, 1951 for appealing to voters' religion and character assassination of Khurshid Ahmed. However, the High Court dismissed the allegation of bribery under Section 123(1) of the Representation of the People Act, 1951.

==== Appeal in the Supreme Court of India ====
Chaudhary Rahim Khan decided to appeal this case in the Supreme Court of India. The bench that heard the case consisted of Justice V. R. Krishna Iyer, Justice Bhagwati, P.N. and Justice Palekar, D.G. The court dismissed the appeal, however, the court judgement stated the following:

"The appellant, in this case, is less guilty than the 1st respondent depicts him but is less innocent than he professes." —Supreme Court of India, 'Rahim Khan vs Khurshid Ahmed and Ors' on 8 August, 1974

The court decided to favour the High Court judgement and officially overturned the 1972 election of Chaudhary Rahim Khan. He was booked under sections 123(3) and (4) of the Representation of the People Act, 1951. Chaudhary Rahim Khan's brother, Chaudhary Sardar Khan won the next Assembly seat from Nuh constituency after Khurshid in 1977. Despite this incident, Chaudhary Rahim Khan went on to have a successful political career, winning the subsequent Legislative Assembly term in 1982 from the Nuh constituency and went on to become a Member of Parliament in the Lok Sabha in 1984 from the Faridabad constituency.

This case is titled "Rahim Khan vs Khurshid Ahmed and Ors on 8 August, 1974" and still holds significant notability in Indian legal history and continues to be part of the curriculum in many Indian law schools to this day.
