= Habib Ur Rehman =

Indian politician (born 1957)

Chaudhary Habib Ur Rehman
- Habib Ur Rehman in 2024

Member of the Haryana Legislative Assembly
- In office 27 February 2005 – 13 October 2009
- Preceded by: Hamid Hussain
- Succeeded by: Aftab Ahmed
- Constituency: Nuh

Personal details
- Born: 1 November 1957 (age 69) Punhana, Punjab, India (present-day Haryana, India)
- Party: Independent
- Other political affiliations: Indian National Congress (2009-2023); Indian National Lok Dal (2023-2024)
- Relations: Rahim Khan family
- Parent: Chaudhary Rahim Khan (father)
- Education: Yasin Meo Degree College (BA)
- Profession: Tehsildar in the Government of Haryana (1983 - 1996)

Chaudhary Habib Ur Rehman (born 1 November 1957), popularly known as Nayab Sahab, is an Indian politician who previously served as a member of the Haryana Legislative Assembly from the Nuh constituency. He was elected as an independent Member of Legislative Assembly once from the Nuh Assembly constituency.

== Early life ==
Habib Ur Rehman was born to Chaudhary Rahim Khan and Shrimati Budho on 1 November 1957 in the village of Sultanpur-Punahana in the Gurgaon district of Punjab (modern-day Nuh district, Haryana). He is the youngest of three brothers and four sisters. He speaks Hindi, Urdu and English fluently.

Habib Ur Rehman comes from a prolific political dynasty highly influential in the Mewat region of Haryana. His father was elected Member of Parliament from the Faridabad constituency. He was also elected to the Haryana Legislative Assembly three times as an independent politician from the Nuh constituency and served as a Cabinet Minister twice in the Government of Haryana. His uncle, Chaudhary Sardar Khan, also served as the Minister of State for Home Affairs of Haryana. His elder brother, Mohammad Ilyas, is also a former two-time Cabinet Minister in the Government of Haryana.

Habib Ur Rehman is married to Jaibun-Nishan and has 2 children, Parvez Habib Alam and Parveen Bano. He completed his Bachelors of Arts Degree from Yasin Meo Degree College in Nuh, Haryana. He served as a Auqaf Officer in the Punjab Waqf Board for two years. He also worked as a Tehsildar or Executive Magistrate in the Government of Haryana from 1983 to 1996 before he was elected a Member of Legislative Assembly, this earned him the more well-known alias 'Nayab Sahab' during the time he was working as a Naib Tehsildar.

== Political career ==
Habib Ur Rehman won the 2005 Haryana Legislative Assembly elections from the Nuh Assembly constituency and served his complete term until 2009. He ran independent and defeated the Indian National Congress candidate, Aftab Ahmed by a margin of 4,359 votes with a total candidate voter turnout of 36,879 votes.

He joined the Indian National Lok Dal party on 25 September 2023. He was then later nominated by Abhay Singh Chautala to be the State Vice-President of the Indian National Lok Dal on 15 October 2023.

Habib Ur Rehman has not contested any election since his win in 2005.

== Legacy ==
In 2009, he was responsible for the establishment of the first medical college in the Mewat region of Haryana, Shaheed Hasan Khan Mewati Government Medical College (SHKM GMC), alongside Bhupinder Singh Hooda, Rao Inderjit Singh, Dr. Krishna Pandit, and Azad Mohammad.

A street in Nuh, Haryana, "Nayab Wali Gali" (transl. 'Street of Nayab'), is also named after him.

== Electoral performance ==
Year	Party	Constituency Name	Result	Votes gained	Vote share	Margin
1996	Haryana Vikas Party	Nuh	Lost	6,602	9.83%	13,799
2000	Bahujan Samaj Party	Nuh	Lost	21,432	27.31%	10,022
2005	Independent	Nuh	Won	36,879	38.31%	4,359
