= Hamid Hussain =

Indian politician

Member of the Haryana Legislative Assembly
- In office 2000–2005
- Preceded by: Khurshid Ahmed
- Succeeded by: Habib Ur Rehman
- Constituency: Nuh

Personal details
- Born: 1 January 1946 Village Rehna, Punjab, India (present-day Haryana, India)
- Party: Indian National Lok Dal
- Relations: Tayyab Husain (brother)
- Parent: Yasin Khan

Chaudhary Hamid Hussain was an Indian Politician and former member of the Haryana Legislative Assembly from the Nuh constituency in the previously Gurgaon district of Haryana. He was elected as Member of Legislative Assembly once from the Nuh Assembly constituency.

== Early life ==
He was born to Yasin Khan, in the village of Rehna, Nuh district. He is the brother of two-time Member of Parliament, Tayyab Husain and uncle of former Nuh MLA, Zakir Hussain.

== Electoral performance ==
2000 Haryana Legislative Assembly election : Nuh
Party	Candidate	Votes	%	±%
INLD	Hamid Hussain	31,454	40.08%	New
INC	Chaudhary Khurshid Ahmed	22,020	28.06%	▲21.67
BSP	Habib Ur Rehman	21,432	27.31%	▲26.53
HVP	Hanif	933	1.19%	▼8.64
NCP	Mohd. Asad	871	1.11%	New
Independent	Sunil Kumar	806	1.03%	New
JD(U)	Gani (Abdul Gani)	461	0.59%	New
Margin of victory		9,434	12.02%	▼0.07
Turnout		78,484	71.42%	▲9.88
Registered electors		1,11,754		▲0.36
INLD gain from INC		Swing	▲9.72	
