= Khanpur Ghati =

Khanpur Ghati is a village located in Nuh district in the state of Haryana, India]. The Khanpur Ghati village has a population of 4225 of which 2188 are males while 2037 are females as per Population Census 2011.

In Khanpur Ghati village population of children with age 0-6 is 968 which makes up 22.91% of total population of village. Average Sex Ratio of Khanpur Ghati village is 931 which is higher than Haryana state average of 879. Child Sex Ratio for the Khanpur Ghati as per census is 1000, higher than Haryana average of 834.

It is about 100km away from New Delhi, 72km away from Gurugram, 30km away from Dist. Headquarter Nuh, 1.7km away from its Block Pinangwan and 23km away from its Tehsil Firozpur Jhirka. Its coordinates are 27°54'23.93"N, 77°04'50.00"E. Khanpur Ghati is also a part of National Capital Region of Delhi (NCR), Situated at Major District Road 131 of Haryana.

== Administration ==
In the year 2017, Sarpanch elections were commenced and around 89% people of the village cast their vote to select their Gram Sarpanch. The current Sarpanch of village Khanpur Ghati is Smt. Naseema w/o Saifuddin.

The main office of Panchayat is located near Meraj Public School, people often take their grievances to the office itself.
