= Zakir Hussain (Haryana politician) =

Indian politician

Chaudhary Zakir Hussain

Administrator of the Haryana Waqf Board
- Incumbent
- Assumed office August 2021
- Jurisdiction: Government of Haryana

National Vice-President of the Bharatiya Janata Party Minority Morcha
- Incumbent
- Assumed office June 2021
- State: Haryana

Member of the Haryana Legislative Assembly
- In office 2014–2019
- Preceded by: Aftab Ahmed
- Succeeded by: Aftab Ahmed
- Constituency: Nuh
- In office 2000–2005
- Preceded by: Suraj Pal Singh
- Succeeded by: Sahida
- Constituency: Taoru
- In office 1991–1996
- Preceded by: Tayyab Husain
- Succeeded by: Suraj Pal Singh
- Constituency: Taoru

President of the All India Mewati Panchayat
- Incumbent
- Assumed office November 2008
- Preceded by: Tayyab Husain

Personal details
- Born: 2 October 1962 (age 64) Rehna, Nuh, Gurgaon
- Party: BJP (2019-Present)
- Spouse: Nasima Begum
- Parent: Tayyab Husain (father)
- Education: Delhi University
- Occupation: Politician

Chaudhary Zakir Hussain (born 2 October 1962) is an Indian politician and member of the Bharatiya Janata Party. He serves as administrator of the Haryana Waqf Board and is the National Vice-President of Bharatiya Janata Party Minority Morcha from Haryana. He is a three term former member of the Haryana Legislative Assembly from Nuh and Taoru.

== Early life ==
Zakir Hussain is an ethnic Meo. As a member of the Tayyab Husain Clan, he comes from a significant political dynasty in the Mewat region of Haryana and Rajasthan. His grandfather, Yasin Khan, served as Member of Punjab Provincial Assembly and Punjab Legislative Assembly from 1926 to 1946 and 1952 to 1962 respectively. His father Tayyab Husain was a Member of Parliament from Gurgaon and Faridabad in the Lok Sabha in 1971 and 1980 respectively. His father is also the only person to serve as a Cabinet Minister in the state governments of three different states at three different times.

Hussain graduated with a Bachelor of Arts (BA) from Kurukshetra University in 1981 and completed his Bachelor of Law (LLB) from Delhi University in 1985.

== Political career ==
Zakir Hussain is a career politician who is associated with Aaya Ram Gaya Ram politics. His father was also known to switch political parties many times. His father changed political parties 3 times in one MLA term. Zakir has been a part of the Indian National Congress, Bahujan Samaj Party, Indian National Lok Dal. He later joined the Bharatiya Janata Party ahead of the state elections in 2019.

Hussain started his political career in 1991, under the banner of his father, as an independent politician from the Taoru constituency. Preceding his win, his father had won elections on the seat three consecutive times. He lost to Suraj Pal Singh in 1996 and later reclaimed the seat under the Indian National Congress in the next term.

Hussain lost the 2005 elections from the Taoru constituency, and then the constituency was abolished. In 2009, He decided to contest the Indian general elections from the Gurgaon Lok Sabha constituency. He joined the Bahujan Samaj Party and lost to the Indian National Congress candidate, Rao Inderjit Singh. After facing defeat in the Lok Sabha elections, he then moved on the Sohna constituency, which re-established by merging the subdivisions of Sohna and Taoru. He contested from the Bahujan Samaj Party and lost again to the Indian National Congress candidate by a close margin of 505 votes.

In 2014, he re-contested the Indian general elections under the Gurgaon constituency from the Indian National Lok Dal. He lost again to Rao Inderjit Singh, who had switched to the Bharatiya Janata Party.

After facing defeat again, he moved on the Nuh constituency, where he contested under the same party. He won the elections and decided to switch to the Bharatiya Janata Party right before the 2019 elections. He contested the 2019 elections under the Bharatiya Janata Party, however, he had to face defeat again.
