= Nuh Assembly constituency =

Constituency of the Haryana legislative assembly in India

Coordinates: 28.10°N 77.00°E

Nuh
- Constituency No. 79 for the Haryana Legislative Assembly

Constituency details
- Country: India
- Region: North India
- State: Haryana
- District: Nuh
- Lok Sabha constituency: Gurgaon
- Established: 1967
- Total electors: 2,06,801
- Reservation: None

Member of Legislative Assembly
- 15th Haryana Legislative Assembly
- Incumbent Aftab Ahmed
- Party: Indian National Congress
- Alliance: I.N.D.I.A
- Elected year: 2024
- Preceded by: Zakir Hussain

Nuh is one of the 90 assembly constituencies in the Haryana Legislative Assembly of the Indian state of Haryana. It is a part of the Nuh district and is also one of nine assembly constituencies in the Gurgaon Lok Sabha constituency. It was previously part of the Faridabad Lok Sabha constituency before the Gurgaon Lok Sabha constituency was re-established in 2008.

Since its formation, the seat has been occupied primarily by Rahim Khan Clan and Khurshid Ahmed Clan from the political families in the region. Chaudhary Rahim Khan and Chaudhary Khurshid Ahmed have been elected to the Legislative Assembly the most number of times.

== Members of the Legislative Assembly ==
Election	Member	Party
1967	Rahim Khan	Independent politician
1968	Khurshed Ahmad	Indian National Congress
1972	Rahim Khan	Independent politician
1977	Sardar Khan	Janata Party
1982	Rahim Khan	Independent politician
1985 (By-elections)	Aftab Khan	Indian National Congress
1987	Khurshid Ahmad	Lok Dal
1989 (By-elections)	Hassan Mohammad	Independent politician
1991	Mohammad Ilyas	Indian National Congress
1996	Khurshid Ahmad	All India Indira Congress
2000	Hamid Hussain	Indian National Lok Dal
2005	Habib-Ur-Rehman	Independent politician
2009	Aftab Ahmed	Indian National Congress
2014	Zakir Hussain	Indian National Lok Dal
2019	Aftab Ahmed	Indian National Congress
2024	Aftab Ahmed	Indian National Congress

== Election results ==
=== Assembly Election 2024 ===
2024 Haryana Legislative Assembly election: Nuh
Party	Candidate	Votes	%	±%
INC	Aftab Ahmed	91,883	59.26	▲17.49
INLD	Tahir Hussain	44,870	28.96	▲26.10
BJP	Sanjay Singh	15,902	10.26	▼28.29
JJP	Birender	1,570	1.01	▼13.16
NOTA	None of the Above	369	0.24	
Margin of victory		46,963	30.30	
Turnout		1,55,006		
Registered electors		2,07,841		▲21.86
INC hold		Swing	▲17.49	

=== Assembly Election 2019 ===
2019 Haryana Legislative Assembly election: Nuh
Party	Candidate	Votes	%	±%
INC	Aftab Ahmed	52,311	41.77	▲16.15
BJP	Zakir Hussain	48,273	38.55	▲18.80
JJP	Tayyab Hussain Ghasediya	17,745	14.17	New
INLD	Nasir Husain Adbar	3,583	2.86	▼49.49
BSP	Arjan	1,668	1.33	New
Margin of victory		4,038	3.22	▼23.51
Turnout		1,25,234	73.43	▼8.86
Registered electors		1,70,551		▲14.41
INC gain from INLD		Swing	▼10.58	

=== Assembly Election 2014 ===
2014 Haryana Legislative Assembly election: Nuh
Party	Candidate	Votes	%	±%
INLD	Zakir Hussain	64,221	52.35	▲40.44
INC	Aftab Ahmed	31,425	25.62	▼13.47
BJP	Sanjay Singh	24,222	19.75	▲0.13
HLP	Niyamat Pahelwan	1,536	1.25	New
Margin of victory		32,796	26.73	▲7.26
Turnout		1,22,672	82.29	▲7.55
Registered electors		1,49,070		▲28.37
INLD gain from INC		Swing	▲13.26	

=== Assembly Election 2009 ===
2009 Haryana Legislative Assembly election: Nuh
Party	Candidate	Votes	%	±%
INC	Aftab Ahmed	33,925	39.09	▲5.31
BJP	Sanjay Singh	17,021	19.61	▲18.39
Independent	Hamid Hussain	12,779	14.72	New
INLD	Badruddin	10,338	11.91	▼9.94
BSP	Jahid	6,843	7.88	▲6.43
Independent	Tayyab Hussain Ghasediya	4,562	5.26	New
Independent	Mohd. Haroon	470	0.54	New
Margin of victory		16,904	19.48	▲14.95
Turnout		86,791	74.74	▲4.97
Registered electors		1,16,128		▼15.83
INC gain from BJP		Swing	▲0.78	

=== Assembly Election 2005 ===
2005 Haryana Legislative Assembly election: Nuh
Party	Candidate	Votes	%	±%
Independent	Habib Ur Rehman	36,879	38.31	New
INC	Chaudhary Aftab Ahmed	32,520	33.78	▲5.73
INLD	Hamid Hussain	21,032	21.85	▼18.23
BSP	Mohammad Asgar	1,403	1.46	▼25.85
Independent	Hukam Chand	1,241	1.29	New
BJP	Sahid	1,172	1.22	New
SP	Mahboob	1,007	1.05	New
Margin of victory		4,359	4.53	▼7.49
Turnout		96,261	69.77	▼0.46
Registered electors		1,37,965		▲23.45
Independent gain from INC		Swing	▼1.77	

=== Assembly Election 2000 ===
2000 Haryana Legislative Assembly election: Nuh
Party	Candidate	Votes	%	±%
INLD	Hamid Hussain	31,454	40.08	New
INC	Chaudhary Khurshid Ahmed	22,020	28.06	▲21.67
BSP	Habib Ur Rehman	21,432	27.31	▲26.53
HVP	Hanif	933	1.19	▼8.64
NCP	Mohd. Asad	871	1.11	New
Independent	Sunil Kumar	806	1.03	New
JD(U)	Gani (Abdul Gani)	461	0.59	New
Margin of victory		9,434	12.02	▼0.07
Turnout		78,484	71.42	▲9.88
Registered electors		1,11,754		▲0.36
INLD gain from INC		Swing	▲9.72	

=== Assembly Election 1996 ===
1996 Haryana Legislative Assembly election: Nuh
Party	Candidate	Votes	%	±%
AIIC(T)	Chaudhary Khurshid Ahmed	20,401	30.36	New
SAP	Hamid Hussain	12,274	18.27	New
Independent	Mohd. Azaz	8,301	12.35	New
Independent	Chaudhary Mohammad Ilyas	7,379	10.98	New
HVP	Habib Ur Rehman	6,602	9.83	▼10.06
INC	Din Mohd	4,293	6.39	▼22.08
SP	Mahboob	1,734	2.58	New
Independent	Subhan Khan	1,546	2.30	New
Independent	Godhu Ram	1,088	1.62	New
BSP	Samsudin	525	0.78	New
Independent	Anwar Hussain	408	0.61	New
Margin of victory		8,127	12.09	▲5.10
Turnout		67,195	63.28	▲0.04
Registered electors		1,11,351		▲10.68
AIIC(T) gain from INC		Swing	▲1.89	

=== Assembly Election 1991 ===
1991 Haryana Legislative Assembly election: Nuh
Party	Candidate	Votes	%	±%
INC	Chaudhary Mohammad Ilyas	17,274	28.47	New
Independent	Hamid Hussain	13,031	21.48	New
HVP	Chaudhary Sardar Khan	12,062	19.88	New
Independent	Din Mohmad Mewati	9,715	16.01	New
BJP	Bashir Ahmed	4,755	7.84	New
JP	Daud	2,842	4.68	New
Independent	Hem Chand Saini	369	0.61	New
Margin of victory		4,243	6.99	
Turnout		60,669	62.27	
Registered electors		1,00,610		
INC gain from Independent		Swing		

=== Assembly By-election 1989 ===
1989 Haryana Legislative Assembly by-election: Nuh
Party	Candidate	Votes	%	±%
Independent	Hassan Mohd.	32,729		New
INC	Chaudhary Mohammad Ilyas	14,206		
Independent	Hamid Hussain	8,939		New
Independent	B. Lal	985		New
Independent	P.C.Premi	523		New
Independent gain from LKD		Swing		

=== Assembly Election 1987 ===
1987 Haryana Legislative Assembly election: Nuh
Party	Candidate	Votes	%	±%
LKD	Chaudhary Khurshid Ahmed	43,743	69.10	New
INC	Chaudhary Mohammad Ilyas	15,773	24.92	New
Independent	Sabir Ahmad	1,242	1.96	New
Independent	Amranand Saraswat	841	1.33	New
Independent	Istayak	643	1.02	New
Independent	Duli Chand	434	0.69	New
Margin of victory		27,970	44.18	
Turnout		63,306	69.96	
Registered electors		91,586		
LKD gain from INC		Swing		

=== Assembly By-election 1985 ===
1985 Haryana Legislative Assembly by-election: Nuh
Party	Candidate	Votes	%	±%
INC	Aftab Khan	23,669		
ICJ	S. Khan	23,556		New
Independent	I.Hussain	1,606		New
CPI	A. K. P. Jada	1,529		New
Independent	Ismail	448		New
Independent	B. Lal	285		New
Margin of victory		113		
INC gain from Independent		Swing		

=== Assembly Election 1982 ===
1982 Haryana Legislative Assembly election: Nuh
Party	Candidate	Votes	%	±%
Independent	Chaudhary Rahim Khan	15,554	32.61	New
INC	Chaudhary Sardar Khan	14,416	30.23	▲15.90
LKD	Din Mohd S/O Murad Khan	6,258	13.12	New
Independent	Mauz Khan	4,543	9.53	New
Independent	Mool Chand	3,769	7.90	New
BJP	Bashir Ahmad S/O Umrao	1,507	3.16	New
Independent	Nawaz Khan	328	0.69	New
Independent	Bashir Ahmad S/O Chhaju	224	0.47	New
Independent	Umar Mohd.	220	0.46	New
Margin of victory		1,138	2.39	▼2.63
Turnout		47,690	65.38	▲7.80
Registered electors		74,364		▲19.44
Independent gain from JP		Swing	▼11.46	

=== Assembly Election 1977 ===
1977 Haryana Legislative Assembly election: Nuh
Party	Candidate	Votes	%	±%
JP	Chaudhary Sardar Khan	15,457	44.07	New
Independent	Din Mohd	13,699	39.06	New
INC	Mauj Khan	5,027	14.33	▼31.88
Independent	Wali Mohd.	890	2.54	New
Margin of victory		1,758	5.01	▲1.10
Turnout		35,073	56.86	▼17.49
Registered electors		62,263		▼2.11
JP gain from Independent		Swing	▼6.06	

=== Assembly Election 1972 ===
1972 Haryana Legislative Assembly election: Nuh
Party	Candidate	Votes	%	±%
Independent	Chaudhary Rahim Khan	23,536	50.13	New
INC	Chaudhary Khurshid Ahmed	21,697	46.21	▼7.25
ABJS	Badri Parshad	909	1.94	▼8.96
Independent	Mauj Khan	587	1.25	New
Independent	Sohan Lal	224	0.48	New
Margin of victory		1,839	3.92	▼17.71
Turnout		46,953	75.67	▲24.50
Registered electors		63,604		▲14.27
Independent gain from INC		Swing	▼3.33	

=== Assembly Election 1968 ===
1968 Haryana Legislative Assembly election: Nuh
Party	Candidate	Votes	%	±%
INC	Chaudhary Khurshid Ahmed	14,675	53.46	▲53.07
VHP	Chaudhary Rahim Khan	8,738	31.83	New
ABJS	Shankar Singh	2,991	10.90	▲10.7
Independent	Bashir Ahmad	1,046	3.81	New
Margin of victory		5,937	21.63	▲18.79
Turnout		27,450	50.72	▼17.02
Registered electors		55,661		▲0.73
INC gain from Independent		Swing	▲11.96	

=== Assembly Election 1967 ===
1967 Haryana Legislative Assembly election: Nuh
Party	Candidate	Votes	%	±%
Independent	Chaudhary Rahim Khan	15,212	41.50	New
INC	K. Ahmed	14,171	38.66	New
ABJS	K. Singh	7,274	19.84	New
Margin of victory		1,041	2.84	
Turnout		36,657	70.71	
Registered electors		55,256		
Independent win (new seat)				

== See also ==
- Nuh
- Nuh district
- List of constituencies of Haryana Legislative Assembly
