= Punahana Assembly constituency =

Legislative Assembly constituency in Haryana State, India

Coordinates: 27.87°N 77.2°E

Punahana
- Constituency No. 81 for the Haryana Legislative Assembly

Constituency details
- Country: India
- Region: North India
- State: Haryana
- District: Nuh
- Lok Sabha constituency: Gurgaon
- Established: 2009
- Total electors: 2,04,686
- Reservation: None

Member of Legislative Assembly
- 15th Haryana Legislative Assembly
- Incumbent Mohammad Ilyas
- Party: Indian National Congress
- Alliance: INDIA
- Elected year: 2024
- Preceded by: Rahish Khan

Punahana is one of the 90 Legislative Assembly constituencies of the Indian state of Haryana. It is a part of the Nuh district in Haryana. It was established in 2009 by carving out parts from the Nuh and Ferozepur Jhirka assembly constituencies.

Mohammed Ilyas has served as the Member of Legislative Assembly the greatest number of times from this constituency.

== Members of the Legislative Assembly ==
Year	Member	Party
2009	Mohammad Ilyas	Indian National Lok Dal
2014	Rahish Khan	Independent
2019	Mohammad Ilyas	Indian National Congress
2024	Mohammad Ilyas	Indian National Congress

== Election results ==
=== Assembly Election 2024 ===
2024 Haryana Legislative Assembly election: Punahana
Party	Candidate	Votes	%	±%
INC	Mohammad Ilyas	85,300	58.31	▲29.55
Independent	Rahish Khan	53,384	36.49	New
BJP	Mohd Aizaz Khan	5,072	3.47	▼14.09
AAP	Nayab Hussain	854	0.58	New
ASP(KR)	Ataullah	829	0.57	New
NOTA	None of the Above	345	0.24	▼0.26
Margin of victory		31,916	21.82	▲21.15
Turnout		1,46,279	70.91	▲0.14
Registered electors		2,04,686		▲19.65
INC hold		Swing	▲29.55	

=== Assembly Election 2019 ===
2019 Haryana Legislative Assembly election: Punahana
Party	Candidate	Votes	%	±%
INC	Chaudhary Mohammad Ilyas	35,092	28.76	▲17.72
Independent	Rahish Khan	34,276	28.09	New
BJP	Nauksham Chaudhary	21,421	17.56	▼4.11
JJP	Iqbal	17,327	14.20	New
INLD	Subhan Khan	10,809	8.86	▼17.99
Independent	Azmat	734	0.60	New
Independent	Prahlad	702	0.58	New
NOTA	Nota	611	0.50	New
Margin of victory		816	0.67	▼2.04
Turnout		1,22,014	70.77	▼5.77
Registered electors		1,72,398		▲13.77
INC gain from Independent		Swing	▼0.80	

=== Assembly Election 2014 ===
2014 Haryana Legislative Assembly election: Punahana
Party	Candidate	Votes	%	±%
Independent	Rahish Khan	34,281	29.56	New
INLD	Chaudhary Mohammad Ilyas	31,140	26.85	▲3.63
BJP	Iqbal	25,135	21.67	▲20.64
INC	Subhan Khan	12,809	11.04	▼3.19
BSP	Dayawati	10,096	8.70	▼11.21
Margin of victory		3,141	2.71	▼0.60
Turnout		1,15,987	76.54	▲3.70
Registered electors		1,51,538		▲35.85
Independent gain from INLD		Swing	▲6.34	

=== Assembly Election 2009 ===
2009 Haryana Legislative Assembly election: Punahana
Party	Candidate	Votes	%	±%
INLD	Chaudhary Mohammad Ilyas	18,865	23.22	New
BSP	Dayawati Bhadana	16,177	19.91	New
Independent	Iqbal	11,664	14.36	New
INC	Akhtar Hussain	11,564	14.23	New
Independent	Rahish Khan	9,774	12.03	New
Independent	Mohd. Aizaz	6,665	8.20	New
Independent	Sahab Khan	2,611	3.21	New
BJP	Tayyub	836	1.03	New
Braj Vikas Party	Nasru Alias Kutar	766	0.94	New
HJC(BL)	Safi Mohammad	433	0.53	New
Margin of victory		2,688	3.31	
Turnout		81,252	72.84	
Registered electors		1,11,551		
INLD win (new seat)				

== See also ==
- List of constituencies of the Haryana Legislative Assembly
- Nuh district
