= Dargah Sheikh Musa =

Sufi shrine in Nuh, Mewat, Haryana, India

- Location of the dargah complex in Haryana

Religion
- Affiliation: Sunni Islam
- Sect: Sufi Chishti Order
- Festival: Urs
- Ecclesiastical or organizational status: Dargah; Mosque; Madrassa
- Governing body: Haryana Waqf Board
- Status: Active
- Dedication: Hazrat Sheikh Musa

Location
- Location: Palla, Nuh district, Mewat, Haryana, 624000
- Country: India
- Interactive map of Dargah Sheikh Musa
- Coordinates: 28°06′31″N 76°58′59″E

Architecture
- Type: Mosque architecture
- Style: Mughal; Rajput
- Founder: Khilji Dynasty
- Completed: 1142 AH (1729/1730 CE)

Specifications
- Dome: One (maybe more)
- Minaret: Many
- Site area: 24 Kanals
- Shrine: One
- Materials: Stone; brick; marble; lime

The Dargah Sheikh Musa or Sheikh Musa ki Dargah or Tomb of Sheikh Musa is a Sufi dargah complex affiliated with the Chishti Order, located in Palla village, in the Nuh district of the state of Haryana, India. The dargah contains the mausoleum of Hazrat Sheikh Musa, a 14th-century Sufi saint. Musa moved to Mewat from Delhi to preach Islam. The building is recognised as a State Protected Monument by the Government of Haryana.

The Sheikh Musa Dargah complex is an expansive fortified area of 24 Kanals, that includes a mosque, Sheikh Musa's residential quarters, and a grand gateway, along with several other related structures that predate the dargah itself. A madrasa is also situated within the complex. The main dargah contains the grave of the saint.

== Culture ==
The tomb of Sheikh Musa is known for its water, which is believed to have the power to remove moles (massa, til) if one has faith in the Almighty and applies the holy water to the mole daily. Another interesting feature is the shaking minarets. If you enter one of the minarets and apply a bit of force to shake it, you will feel it moving, and a person standing in the other minaret can also sense the vibrations.

Before the Partition of India, an annual Urs fair was held in his memory, but this tradition ceased after 1957 due to the rise of Deobandi influence in the region.

In 2023, the tradition of Urs was restored and the 712th death anniversary of the saint was celebrated in the Dargah complex with all the Sufi traditions and rites.

== History ==
Hazrat Khwaja Sheikh Musa was a grandson of Baba Fariduddin Ganjshakar and a disciple of Khwaja Nizamuddin Auliya. Upon the instruction of Hazrat Nizamuddin, Sheikh Musa introduced the Meo community of the Mewat region to Islam.

Sheikh Musa was originally from Delhi, and his father, Maulana Badaruddin Ishaq, was a respected scholar. Both Maulana Badaruddin Ishaq and Khwaja Nizamuddin Auliya were disciples of Baba Farid Ganj, who arranged the marriage of his daughter to Maulana Badaruddin Ishaq, resulting in the birth of Hazrat Khwaja Sheikh Musa and Hazrat Khwaja Muhammad Imam. Sheikh Musa lost both parents at a young age, and after their deaths, Nizamuddin Auliya took charge of their upbringing. He sent them on journeys across the country to promote Hindu-Muslim unity and the teachings of Islam.

During one such journey while passing near the Aravalli Mountains, a thorny bush caught his shawl. When he couldn’t free it, he understood the situation and paused there. The place where Hazrat Sheikh Musa’s shawl was caught is where Palla Village now stands. He gained popularity and spent the rest of his life in Mewat while propagating Islam. He died in 733 AH (1332/1333 CE), and the dargah was established by the Khilji Dynasty.

In 1956, a local cleric, Maulana Niyaz Muhammad, appointed an imam to lead prayers (Namaz) and call to prayer (Azaan) at the dargah, and this practice continues to this day. The imam also oversees the dargah and related activities.

In 1957, the annual Urs celebration at the Dargah was discontinued due to the rise of Deobandi-Tablighi influence in the Mewat region.

The whereabouts of the precious topaz stone that adorned Hazrat Sheikh Musa's grave remain unknown. Experts suggest that its value was in the millions, and it is believed to have been stolen and sold. There are even claims that the topaz illuminated the dargah at night.

In 2017, the Government of Haryana declared the site as one of the State Protected Monuments in Haryana.

== Architecture ==
The dargah showcases a harmonious blend of Mughal and Rajput architectural styles. The minarets exemplify Mughal design, while the central chattri reflects Rajput influences. This combination was common during that period, as the Mughals adapted to local building styles, aided by local artisans and craftsmen involved in the construction.

The complex features twelve gateways, including the notable Shaking Minarets, that are 15 metres (50 ft) and 9.1 metres (30 ft) wide, supporting each other. Primarily built from locally sourced stone and lime, the structure's dome and chattri on the top floor incorporate decorative elements. This choice of materials likely reflects a shift in construction practices, as brick is easier to shape and lighter than stone.

The mosque, entirely constructed from stone, features a tomb and an ancient well. The tomb, made of marble, is connected to an underground water source. From the mosque’s arches, one can glimpse the ruins of a nearby old fort.

The construction date is noted as 1142 AH (1729/1730 CE). The minarets, arches, and gateways, date from the 18th to early 19th centuries.

== Location ==
Located in Palla Village in the Mewat region’s Nuh District of Haryana, India, the site is approximately 50 kilometres (31 mi) from Delhi. It can be found at the base of the Aravalli range off the Nuh-Taoru road, near the Mewat Engineering College, and also houses a madrassa where many students reside and study.

== See also ==
- Sufism in India
- List of mosques in India
- List of State Protected Monuments in Haryana
