= Fifth Chautala ministry =

Government of Haryana, India (2000–2005)

- Ministry of the State of Haryana
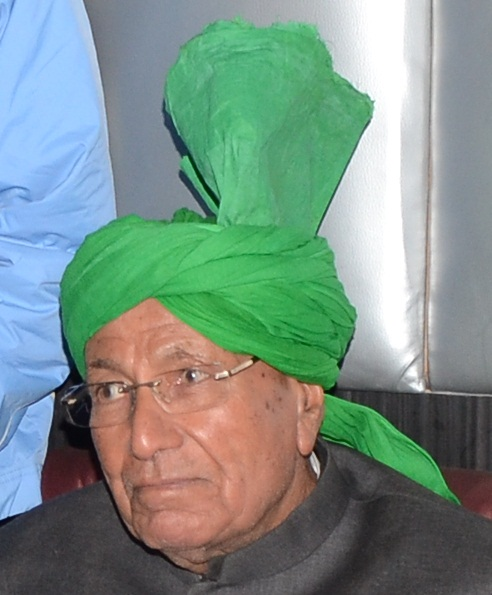
- Om Prakash Chautala; Hon'ble Chief Minister of Haryana
- Date formed: 3 March 2000
- Date dissolved: 5 March 2005

People and organisations
- Head of state: Babu Parmanand
- Head of government: Om Prakash Chautala
- Member parties: Indian National Lok Dal
- Status in legislature: Majority
- Opposition party: INC
- Opposition leader: Bhupinder Singh Hooda

History
- Election: 2000

The 2000 Haryana assembly election resulted in an absolute majority for Indian National Lok Dal. Om Prakash Chautala was elected leader of the party in the assembly and was sworn in as Chief Minister of Haryana on 3 March 2000 for fifth time.

== Cabinet Ministers ==
SI No.	Name	Constituency	Department	Party
1.	Om Prakash Chautala Chief Minister		Chief Minister of Government.	Indian National Lok Dal
2.	Prof. Sampat Singh		Minister of Finance.	Indian National Lok Dal
3.	Dhirpal Singh		Minister of Town & Country Planning.	Indian National Lok Dal
4.	Ashok Kumar		Minister of Transport.	Indian National Lok Dal
5.	Kartar Singh Bhadana		Minister of Cooperation.	Indian National Lok Dal
6.	Sardar Jaswinder Singh Sandhu		Minister of Agriculture.	Indian National Lok Dal

== Minister of State ==
SI No.	Name	Constituency	Department	Party	
1.	Dr. Muni Lal Ranga		Minister of State for Health.		Indian National Lok Dal
2.	Chaudhary Mohammad Ilyas		Minister of State for Animal Husbandry.		Indian National Lok Dal
3.	Chaudhary Risal Singh		Minister of State for Social Welfare.		Indian National Lok Dal
4.	Subhash Goyal		Minister of State for Local Government.		Indian National Lok Dal
5.	Chaudhary Bahadur Singh		Minister of Education.		Indian National Lok Dal
