= Chaudhary Sardar Khan =

Indian politician

- Khan, circa 1978

Minister of State for Home Affairs of Haryana
- In office 21 June 1977 – 28 June 1979
- Chief Minister: Devi Lal
- Governor: Jaisukh Lal Hathi; Harcharan Singh Brar

Member of the Haryana Legislative Assembly
- In office 4 July 1977 – 19 April 1982
- Preceded by: Chaudhary Rahim Khan
- Succeeded by: Chaudhary Rahim Khan
- Constituency: Nuh

Personal details
- Born: 1 May 1935 Punhana, Punjab Province, British India (present-day Haryana, India)
- Died: December 19, 1992 (aged 57)
- Party: Janata Party
- Relations: Chaudhary Rahim Khan (brother), Chaudhary Habib Ur Rehman (nephew), Chaudhary Mohammad Ilyas (nephew)
- Parent: Shri Nawaz Khan (father)

Chaudhary Sardar Khan (born 1 May 1935) was an Indian politician who served as the Minister of State for Home Affairs of Haryana. He was elected as a Member of Legislative Assembly from the Nuh constituency under the Janata Party.

== Early life ==
Sardar Khan was born to Shri Nawaz Khan in the village of Sultanpur-Punahana, Haryana. He is the younger brother of Chaudhary Rahim Khan. His educational journey began at B.M. High School in Nuh, where he completed his Intermediate (F.A.) education. Later, he pursued further studies at Dayal Singh College, which was formerly known as Camp College.

== Personal ==
Chaudhary Sardar Khan married Shrimati Resuli Begum, and had four sons and two daughters. He is a member of the Rahim Khan political dynasty, one of the most prominent political families in the Mewat region of Haryana.

He was fluent in Urdu, Hindi, and English. Notably, Sardar Khan also followed a vegetarian lifestyle.
