= Sultanpur-Punahana =

Village in Haryana, India

Sultanpur-Punahana Katpuri
- Village
- Location within Haryana Location within India
- Coordinates: 27.9069°N 77.1456°E
- Country: India
- State: Haryana
- District: Nuh district

Government
  - Type: Local government
  - Body: Gram Panchayat
- Elevation: 199 m (653 ft)

Population (2020)
  - Total: 5,118
  - Density: 1,230/km^{2} (3,200/sq mi)
- Demonym: Katpuriya

Languages
- Time zone: UTC+5:30 (IST)
- ZIP code: 121104
- ISO 3166 code: IN-HR
- Vehicle registration: HR

Sultanpur-Punahana, natively known as Katpuri, is a village in northern India within the Nuh district of Haryana. It is under the district sub-division of Punahana. It is also the origin place of the Rahim Khan political dynasty of Haryana.

== Demography ==
It had a total population of 2,084, with 1,069 male population and 1,015 female as per 2011 Census of India. It has a literacy rate of 39.20%. In 2020, the total population was cited to be 5118.

== Administration ==
The village local governance is managed by the elected panchayat headed by the Sarpanch.

== Notable people ==
- Chaudhary Rahim Khan, Former Member of Parliament from Faridabad and Cabinet Minister, Government of Haryana.
- Chaudhary Sardar Khan, Former Deputy Home Minister of Haryana.
- Habib Ur Rehman, Former MLA from Nuh.
- Mohammad Ilyas, MLA from Punhana and Former Cabinet Minister, Government of Haryana.

== See also ==
- Punahana
- Mewat
- Gurgaon
