= All India Meo Sabha =

Indian Political Organisation

All India Meo Sabha आल इंडिया मेव सभा
- Founder: Chaudhary Rahim Khan
- Founded: 1967
- Ideology: Ethnic nationalism Meo upliftment
- Regional affiliation: Mewat

The All India Meo Sabha (English: All India Assembly for Meos) (abbreviation: AIMS) was an Indian political organisation and advocacy group based primarily in the Mewat region of India. It was formed under the leadership of Chaudhary Rahim Khan in 1967.

== History ==
The All India Meo Sabha was founded by Chaudhary Rahim Khan in 1967. It was responsible for uniting Meos that were scattered across Haryana, Rajasthan, Delhi, Madhya Pradesh, Maharashtra and Uttar Pradesh, post independence. The organization under the leadership of Chaudhary Rahim Khan made demands for a university in Mewat, extension of railway lines to the Mewat region of Rajasthan and Haryana, as well as the recognition of the ethnic Meos as part of the Scheduled Tribes denomination in India and granting them reservations accordingly due to their economically and educationally disadvantaged status in Indian society.

== Newspaper ==
In 1986, the All India Meo Sabha started a Newspaper titled the "Meo Times".

== Achievements ==
- Ethnic Meos are now recognised as a part of the Other Backwards Class classification in the Government of India.
- Shaheed Hasan Khan Mewati Government Medical College is the first and currently only Medical College recognised by the Medical Council of India in the Mewat region of Haryana.
- There is also the Mewat Engineering College now functional in Nuh, Haryana.
- Formation of Delhi-Nuh Railway Line as requested by Chaudhary Rahim Khan.
