= Chaudhary Khurshid Ahmed =

Indian politician and Supreme Court lawyer (1934–2020)

- Official portrait, 1996

Member of Parliament, Lok Sabha
- In office 1988 – 1989 (by re-election)
- Preceded by: Chaudhary Rahim Khan
- Succeeded by: Bhajan Lal

Personal details
- Born: 20 June 1934 Village Dhulawat, Taoru, British India
- Died: 17 February 2020 (aged 85)
- Party: Lok Dal
- Other political affiliations: Indian National Congress
- Children: 4, including Aftab Ahmed (son)
- Education: Bachelor of Arts, Master of Arts, Bachelor of Legislative Law
- Alma mater: Delhi University
- Occupation: Politician, lawyer

Chaudhary Khurshid Ahmed (20 June 1934 – 17 February 2020) was an Indian politician and a practicing lawyer before the Supreme Court of India, who served as Member of Lok Sabha in a by-poll election from the Lokdal party proceeding the death of the previous office holder, Chaudhary Rahim Khan. Ahmed was a Member of Parliament for no longer than 8 months. He was also elected as a Member of the Legislative Assembly to the Punjab and Haryana assembly five times.

== Early life ==
Khurshid Ahmed was born to Chaudhary Kabir Ahmed and Faizan Begum. After independence, his father was twice elected to Haryana assembly.

== Personal life ==
Khurshid Ahmed married Firdos Begum in 1961. He had three sons and one daughter – Aftab Ahmed, Mehtab Ahmed, Anjum Ahmed and Rukhsana. Aftab Ahmed was elected as MLA from Nuh constituency on the ticket of Congress Party and is a former Cabinet Minister in the Government of Haryana. He was also the Vice-President of Haryana Pradesh Congress Committee. Mehtab Ahmed is practicing lawyer, while youngest son Anjum Ahmed is Practicing lawyer in High Court of Punjab & Haryana.

== Political career ==
He was elected to the state assembly five times and twice and represented the Faridabad constituency once, Lok Sabha from the Lokdal party as well.

1962	Punjab Legislative Assembly
1968	Haryana Legislative Assembly (Cabinet Minister)
1977	Haryana Legislative Assembly
1979–82	Haryana Legislative Assembly (Cabinet Minister)
1982–84	Deputy Chairman, Planning Board, Haryana
1987	Haryana Legislative Assembly
1988	Lok Sabha (by-election)
1996	Haryana Legislative Assembly

He also held various positions in the Congress Party as well:

1972–75	General Secretary, Haryana Pradesh Congress Committee
1985–86	Vice President, Haryana Pradesh Congress Committee
1997–2000	President District Congress Committee, Gurgaon

== Controversies ==
=== Provocation the 1993 Mewat Riots ===
The 1993 Mewat riots in the southern region of Haryana's Gurgaon district (modern-day Nuh district) erupted following the demolition of the Babri Masjid, triggering violence between the region's Meo Muslim community and Hindus. The unrest began on December 7, 1992, after rumors spread that Hindus in Nuh were celebrating the mosque's demolition, leading to Muslim mobs attacking Hindu temples in Nuh, Punhana, and Pinangwan.

The violence, reportedly instigated by Khurshid Ahmed, involved hired youth who ransacked and burned temples, and even committed atrocities like burning a cow alive. The police's delayed response escalated tensions, resulting in indiscriminate raids and alleged abuses against the Meo community, with many villagers fleeing their homes.

Tayyab Husain, and his son Zakir Hussain, who was an MLA from the neighboring Taoru constituency, were also implicated by some in the Muslim community. They were political rivals of Khurshid Ahmed and were accused of exploiting the situation to expand their influence among the Meos.

Politicians Khurshid Ahmed and his son, Aftab Ahmed, were booked for instigating the riots and went into hiding, while former home minister Tayyab Hussain and his son Zakir Hussain, an MLA from Taoru, were accused by some of exploiting the situation for political gain. Both communities were left distrustful of the police, who were widely criticized for their handling of the situation, and the region, previously peaceful, was deeply scarred by the violence.

=== Unconstitutional Political Corruption Incident with Indira Gandhi ===
The controversies surrounding Khurshid Ahmed, as outlined in Maloy Krishna Dhar's account from the book "Open Secrets," depict a narrative of political manipulation and secret illegal operations. Allegations suggest his involvement in orchestrating events to undermine the electoral success of Devi Lal, a prominent political figure. One instance detailed is the facilitation of a meeting between Indira Gandhi and Devi Lal, despite the Devi Lal's initial reluctance. Ahmed's role in what was termed as 'Operation Harit' involved persuading Haryana's Legislative Assembly members to defect to the Indira Congress.

Khurshid Ahmed and others reportedly took "one million to five million" rupees each to engage in this political corruption according to Maloy Krishna Dhar's own testimony.

=== Rahim Khan vs Khurshid Ahmed on 8 August, 1974 ===
In 1972, Chaudhary Rahim Khan won his second term in Haryana's Legislative Assembly, defeating Khurshid Ahmed, who was a sitting minister at that time. Following his humiliating defeat, Khurshid Ahmed filed a case in the Punjab and Haryana High Court, challenging Rahim Khan's election on various grounds of corrupt practices. The High Court ruled in favour of Ahmed, setting aside Rahim Khan's election and citing violations of sections 123(1), (2), and (4) of the Representation of the People Act, 1951.

Khurshid Ahmed accused Rahim Khan of bribery (Section 123(1)), appealing to faith (Section 123(3)), and character assassination (Section 123(4)) of the Representation of the People Act, 1951. The court found evidence supporting the charges of appealing to voters' religion by calling Ahmed a non-believer and character assassination through the distribution of damaging handbills which stated that Khurshid Ahmed was a womaniser and committed Islamically illicit practices such as feeding Muslims pork, leading to the finding of corrupt practices of Rahim Khan under sections 123(3) and (4). Khan appealed the case to the Supreme Court of India, but the appeal was dismissed. The Supreme Court upheld the High Court's judgment, officially overturning Rahim Khan's 1972 election. This case, known as "Rahim Khan vs Khurshid Ahmed and Ors on 8 August, 1974", remains significant in Indian legal history and is still included in the curriculum of many Indian law schools today.
