= Aftab Ahmed (Indian politician) =

Indian politician

Chaudhary Aftab Ahmed
- Ahmed in 2026

Member of the Haryana Legislative Assembly
- Incumbent
- Assumed office 24 October 2019
- Preceded by: Zakir Hussain
- Constituency: Nuh
- In office 22 October 2009 – 15 October 2014
- Preceded by: Habib Ur Rehman
- Succeeded by: Zakir Hussain
- Constituency: Nuh
Previous Ministries and Portfolios
Deputy Leader of the Opposition, Haryana Legislative Assembly
In office 2 November 2019 – 12 September 2024
Governor	Bandaru Dattatreya
Speaker	Gian Chand Gupta
Leader of the Opposition	Bhupinder Singh Hooda
Minister of Transport, Government of Haryana
In office 20 October 2013 – 27 October 2014
Additional Ministry and Departments	Tourism; Printing & Stationery
Chief Minister	Bhupinder Singh Hooda
Preceded by	Om Parkash Jain (resigned)
Succeeded by	Ram Bilas Sharma

Personal details
- Born: 27 January 1966 (age 60) Faridabad, Haryana, India
- Party: Indian National Congress
- Parent: Khurshid Ahmed
- Education: Panjab University (B. Com), MDU, Rohtak (LLB)
- Occupation: Businessman, farmer and lawyer

Chaudhary Aftab Ahmed is an Indian politician, who is currently serving as a member of the Haryana Legislative Assembly from the Nuh constituency since 2019.

He has previously served as the Deputy Leader of Opposition of the Haryana Legislative Assembly from 2019 to 2024 and has also served as the Minister of Transport, Tourism, Printing & Stationery in the Government of Haryana from 2013 to 2014.

He was also the Vice-President of the Haryana Pradesh Congress Committee for the Nuh district.

== Early life and family ==
Aftab Ahmed was born to Khurshid Ahmed and Firdos Begum on 27 January 1966 in the Dhouj village of the Faridabad district of Haryana.

He obtained a Bachelor of Commerce degree from GGDSD College Chandigarh, Panjab University and LLB degree from MDU, Rohtak.

His father was elected as Member of the Legislative Assembly from Nuh Assembly of Punjab in 1962, Taoru Assembly of Haryana in 1968 and 1977, and again from Nuh Assembly of Haryana in 1987 and 1996. His father served as a Cabinet Minister thrice in the Government of Haryana and was later elected as Member of Parliament, Lok Sabha in a bypoll election.

His grandfather Chaudhary Kabir Ahmed was elected as Member of the Legislative Assembly from Nuh Assembly, Haryana in 1975 and from Taoru Assembly, Haryana in 1982.

== Personal life ==
Ahmed married Memuna Sultan and has three children.

== Political career ==
He started his political career in 1991 from Taoru and in 2013 he was inducted into the cabinet as transport minister. He has served Indian National Congress at organizational level in different capacities and also as chief whip of the Congress Legislature Party.

He served as the Deputy Leader of Opposition of Haryana from November 2019 to September 2024.

== Controversies ==
=== Involvement in instigating 1993 Mewat Riots ===
The 1993 Mewat riots in the southern region of Haryana's Gurgaon district (modern-day Nuh district) erupted following the demolition of the Babri Masjid, triggering violence between the region's Meo Muslim community and Hindus. The unrest began on 7 December 1992, after rumors spread that Hindus in Nuh were celebrating the mosque's demolition, leading to Muslim mobs attacking Hindu temples in Nuh, Punhana, and Pinangwan.

The violence, reportedly instigated by Aftab's father, Khurshid Ahmed, involved hired youth who ransacked and burned temples, and even committed atrocities like burning a cow alive. The police's delayed response escalated tensions, resulting in indiscriminate raids and alleged abuses against the Meo community, with many villagers fleeing their homes.

Tayyab Husain, and his son Zakir Hussain, who was an MLA from the neighboring Taoru constituency, were also implicated by some in the Muslim community. They were political rivals of Khurshid Ahmed and Aftab Ahmed and were accused of exploiting the situation to expand their influence among the Meos.

Politicians Aftab Ahmed and his father Khurshid Ahmed, were booked for instigating the riots and went into hiding, while former minister Tayyab Hussain and his son Zakir Hussain, an MLA from Taoru, were accused by some of exploiting the situation for political gain. Both communities were left distrustful of the police, who were widely criticized for their handling of the situation, and the region, previously peaceful, was deeply scarred by the violence.
