= Pinangwan =

- Location in Haryana, India Pinangwan (India)
- Coordinates: 27°51′37″N 77°10′09″E
- Country: India
- State: Haryana
- District: Nuh
- Elevation: 187 m (614 ft)

Population (2011)
  - Total: 12,612

Languages
  - Official: Hindi
- Time zone: UTC+5:30 (IST)
- PIN: 122508 Vehicle registration plate = HR-93
- ISO 3166 code: IN-HR
- Website: nuh.gov.in

Pinangwan is a town and eponymous block in Nuh district of Haryana state of India. It lies in the Mewat region of Delhi NCR and Delhi–Mumbai Industrial Corridor. It is located on the MDR131 to Punhana and is also adjacent to the Delhi–Mumbai Expressway.

== History ==
The town was upgraded to the status of a "Development Block" in mid 2017 under the Chief Minister of Haryana, Manohar Lal Khattar.

== Geography ==
Pinangwan is located at 27.90°N, 77.10°E in the National Capital Region of Nuh District in Haryana. The town falls on the southern border of Haryana, near Alwar and Bharatpur Districts of Rajasthan. It is 100 km from the national capital New Delhi and 355 km from state capital Chandigarh.

== Demography ==
Pinangwan had a population of 12,612 of which 6,521 are males while 6,091 are females, according to the Census of India 2011 report.

== Facilities ==
The town has a Govt Senior Secondary School, an Industrial Training Institute and a police station.

== See also ==
- Delhi Ridge
- Leopards of Haryana
- List of protected areas of Haryana
