= Nuh district =

Coordinates: 28°06′N 77°00′E

- District of Haryana
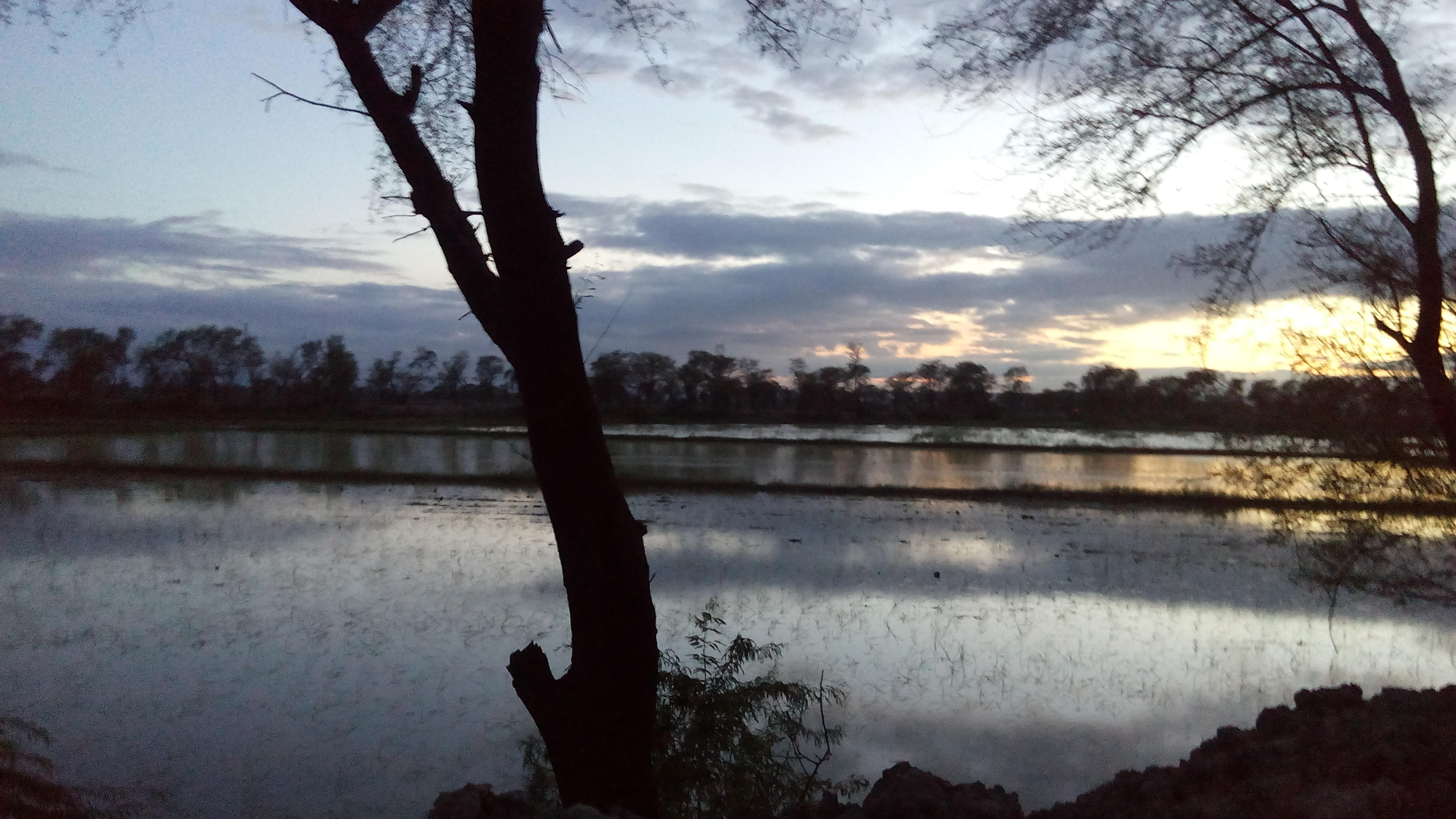

- Location in Haryana
- Country: India
- State: Haryana
- Division: Faridabad
- Headquarters: Nuh
- Tehsils: Nuh, Ferozepur Jhirka, Punahana, Taoru

Area
  - Total: 1,507 km^{2} (582 sq mi)

Population (2011)
  - Total: 1,089,263
  - Density: 722.8/km^{2} (1,872/sq mi)
  - Urban: 11.39%

Demographics
  - Literacy: 54.08
  - Sex ratio: 907
- Time zone: UTC+05:30 (IST)
- Vehicle registration: 1. HR 27 (Nuh); 2.HR 28 (Ferozepur Jhirka) 3.HR 74 (RTA Nuh) 4.HR 93 (Punahana) 5.HR 96 (Taoru)
- Major highways: National Highway 248-A (Gurgaon–Sohna–Alwar), KMP Expressway and Delhi–Mumbai Expressway
- Average annual precipitation: 594 mm (23.4 in)
- Lok Sabha constituencies: Gurgaon (Lok Sabha constituency)
- Vidhan Sabha constituencies: 1. Nuh, 2. Ferozepur Jhirka, 3. Punahana, 4. Sohna-Taoru
- Website: nuh.gov.in

Nuh district, formerly known as the Mewat district, is one of the 23 districts of the northern Indian state of Haryana. The district is known for having the largest Muslim population in Haryana. It lies within the National Capital Region as well as the historical Mewat region and Braj region of India.

It has an area of 1,860 square kilometres (720 sq mi) and had a population of 1.09 million in 2011. It is bounded by Gurugram district to the north, Palwal district of Haryana to the east, Deeg and Alwar districts to the south and the Bharatpur district of Rajasthan to the west. There are four sub-divisions in this district: Nuh, Ferozepur Jhirka, Punahana, and Taoru.

In 2018, the Government of India's think tank NITI Aayog listed Nuh district as the most underdeveloped of India's 739 districts. Despite bordering Gurgaon district, Haryana's rich industrial and financial heartland, this district had the worst health and nutrition, education, agriculture and water resources, financial inclusion and skill development and basic infrastructure.

== History ==
The Nuh district area is a small part of the vast historical and cultural region of Mewat.

=== Khanzada dynasty ===
Mewat was a kingdom in Rajputana with its capital at Alwar ruled by a Khanzada Mewati Rajput dynasty during the period of the Delhi Sultanate in India. Raja Hassan Khan Mewati was represented the Meo Khanzada in Battle of Khanwa. Mewat was covered over a wide area, it included Hathin tehsil, Nuh district, Tijara, Gurgaon, Kishangarh Bas, Ramgarh, Laxmangarh Tehsils Aravalli Range in Alwar district and Pahari, Nagar, Kaman tehsils in Bharatpur district of Rajasthan and also some part of Mathura district of Uttar Pradesh. The last ruler of Mewat, Hasan Khan Mewati was killed in the battle of Khanwa against the Mughal emperor Babur. The Meo Khanzadas were descended from Hindu Yadu Rajputs.

=== Maratha Empire ===
During the Maratha Empire, Mahadaji Shinde, had conquered most of the region from the Mughals and northern Mewat (Nuh district) came under the Maratha Confederacy. All of the Gurgaon district area of Punjab (which consisted of present-day districts of Faridabad, Rewari, and Mahendargah and Nuh) was conquered by French generals in late 18th century.

=== British Raj ===
Daulat Rao Sindhia ceded the Gurgaon region to the British on 30 December 1803 under the Treaty of Surji-Anjangaon to the British East India Company leading to the Company rule in India. The southern and western Gurgaon region remained under the Bharatpur Jat Kings and their vassal relatives, one of whom was Nahar Singh of Ballabgarh.

After the Rebellion of 1857, the Nuh district area became a part of the Gurgaon district in the Punjab Province of British India. The Meos of southern Gurgaon (modern-day Nuh district) were leaders in the Rebellion and even momentarily formed their own government of Chaudharies as they drove the British out.

=== Reformation ===
During the British era, the Meo Muslims who inhabited this region were syncretic in past rituals.

"The Meos (Muhammadans) of the eastern Punjab still participate in the observance of the Holi and Diwali festivals. On the latter occasion they paint the horns, hoofs, etc., of their bullocks and join in the general rejoicings".

— Excerpt from the Census of India (Punjab Province), 1911 AD

In the 1920s the grassroots Islamic movement Tablighi Jamaat arose from this region under Muhammad Ilyas Kandhlwai as a reformist movement. This Muslim region was heavily inflicted by partition violence of 1947, which in turn naturally altered the syncretic life style of people in the region.

=== Partition violence ===
During Indian independence, there was a surge in Communal tension when Jinnah demanded for a separate nation as a result of which Partition of India was proposed by the British rulers. A branch of the All India Muslim League was established in the area, which had proposed a separate province for Meos and a significant number of Meos became members of the organization. During partition some Meo Muslim villages were attacked; when the Meos retaliated they were attacked by the Hindu princely state maharajas. The violence has been remembered by the Meo Muslims and lead them to embrace a more Islamic identity. The Meos' Islamic identity has also been enhanced due to better education, communication and transportation. As secular schools have increased in the area, so have the religious madrassas. Many Meos have traveled to Delhi to attend religious gatherings, or visited their relatives in Pakistan. Mahatma Gandhi later visited the village of Ghasera in the district and requested Meos not to leave India. Chaudhary Mohammad Yasin Khan, a prominent social reformer in the region, was responsible for bringing Gandhi to Ghasera village. Because of Mahatama Gandhi, some Meos were resettled in Laxmangarh, Nagar, Kaman, Deeg of Alwar district and Bharatpur district. Due to this, the people of Ghasera still celebrate Mewat Day.

=== Post-Partition ===
Yasin Khan's political leadership created three infamous political dynasties in the region, the Tayyab Husain clan, Rahim Khan clan and the Ahmed clan. Yasin Khan put forward his own son, Tayyab Husain, during his lifetime. Husain later brought on Khurshid Ahmed and Rahim Khan also emerged as political leader in rebellion to the two in the region. These political dynasties have gained notoriety and continue to have significant influence in the politics and culture of district.

The District was officially established on 4 April 2005, by taking areas from Gurgaon district and the Hathin sub-division of Faridabad district. However, in 2008, Hathin sub-division was reorganized in the new district of Palwal. The district was renamed from Mewat to Nuh in 2016, because Mewat is a historical and cultural region which spans farther into the states of Haryana, Rajasthan and Uttar Pradesh. The Nuh district, although was called Mewat, did not encompass the entire historical Mewat region, rather only a small part of it The district currently comprises Nuh, Taoru, Nagina, Ferozepur Jhirka, Indri, Punhana and Pinangwan blocks, 431 villages and 297 panchayats. There had been 512 villages and 365 panchayats in district before Hathin Block was transferred to Palwal district.

In 2023, the district was rocked by the 2023 Haryana riots.

== Geography ==
The covers an area of Nuh district is 1,507 square kilometres (582 sq mi).

== Administrative divisions ==
There are 4 subdivisions or tehsils in the district with one sub-tehsil for the Nuh tehsil. There are a total of 7 blocks in the district as mentioned below:

=== Sub-divisions ===
- Nuh
- Ferozepur Jhirka
- Punahana
- Taoru

==== Sub Tehsil ====
- Nagina (Note: Nagina is a sub-tehsil of the Nuh tehsil)

=== Blocks ===
- Nuh
- Ferozepur Jhirka
- Punhana
- Taoru
- Nagina
- Indri
- Pinangwan

== Assembly constituencies ==
There are three Haryana Vidhan Sabha constituencies in this district: Nuh, Ferozepur Jhirka and Punahana. All 3 are part of the Gurgaon Lok Sabha constituency. Taoru from the Nuh district (previously Taoru Assembly constituency) comes under Sohna constituency of Gurugram district.

== Notable towns and villages ==
=== City ===
- Nuh

=== Towns ===
- Ferozepur Jhirka
- Pinangwan
- Punahana
- Nagina
- Tauru

=== Villages ===
- Jai Singh Pur
- Ghasera
- Khanpur Ghati
- Sultanpur-Punahana
- Sudaka
- Salaheri
- Shikrawa
- Sangel
- Akera
- Malab
- Nizampur
- Chandeni
- Ranika
- Meoli
- Oontka
- Nangli

== Demographics ==
According to the 2011 census, Nuh district had a population of 1,089,263. By population, it ranks 420th among the 640 districts of India. The district had a population density of 729 inhabitants per square kilometre (1,890/sq mi). Its population growth rate over the decade 2001–2011 was 37.94%. It had a sex ratio of 906 females for every 1000 males, and a literacy rate of 56.1%. 11.39% of the population lives in urban areas. Scheduled Castes make up 6.91% of the population.

Historical population
Year	Pop.	±% p.a.
1901	167,539	—
1911	146,094	−1.36%
1921	136,085	−0.71%
1931	148,756	+0.89%
1941	171,014	+1.40%
1951	184,705	+0.77%
1961	239,352	+2.63%
1971	320,670	+2.97%
1981	392,173	+2.03%
1991	539,299	+3.24%
2001	785,594	+3.83%
2011	1,089,263	+3.32%

Religion in Nuh district (2011)
Religion	Percent
Islam	79.20%
Hinduism	20.37%
Other or not stated	0.43%

Religious composition of Nuh district by sub-district, 2011
Sub-district	Population	Hindu (%)	Muslim (%)	Others (%)
Taoru	166,778	42.00	57.66	0.34
Nuh	287,101	23.09	76.53	0.38
Ferozepur Jhirka	343,406	14.36	84.93	0.71
Punahana	291,978	12.39	87.38	0.23
Nuh district	1,089,263	20.37	79.20	0.44

Note: "Others" comprises Christians, Sikhs, Buddhists, Jains, followers of other religions and persuasions, and persons whose religion was not stated.

Religion in Nuh District (Note: 1941 figures are for Nuh and Firozpur Jhirka tehsils of the former Gurgaon District, which roughly corresponds to present-day Nuh district. Historic district borders may not be an exact match in the present-day due to various bifurcations to district borders — which since created new districts — throughout the historic Punjab Province region during the post-independence era that have taken into account population increases.)
Religion	Population (1941)		Population (2011)	
Islam	182,962	67.42%	862,647	79.2%
Hinduism (Note: 1941 census: Including Ad-Dharmis)	87,647	32.3%	221,846	20.37%
Others (Note: Including Jainism, Buddhism, Zoroastrianism, Judaism, Christianity, Sikhism or not stated)	783	0.29%	4,770	0.44%
Total Population	271,392	100%	1,089,263	100%

It is the only Muslim majority district in Haryana, and has the highest proportion of Muslims in North India outside Jammu and Kashmir.

Languages of Nuh district (2011)
1. Hindi (36.2%)
2. Mewati (34.8%)
3. Urdu (25.8%)
4. Haryanvi (2.84%)
5. Others (0.48%)

At the time of the 2011 Census of India, 36.17% of the population in the district spoke Hindi, 34.75% Mewati, 25.76% Urdu and 2.84% Haryanvi as their first language.

== Economy ==
The main occupation in the district is agriculture, followed by allied and agro-based activities. The Meos are the predominant population group and are all agriculturists.

== Transport ==
Nuh town is on National Highway 248A (NH 248A) (previously known as the Gurgaon–Sohna–Alwar road), connecting the district to Gurugram and Alwar. The Kundli–Manesar–Palwal (KMP) Expressway provides high-speed access to the district from Palwal and Manesar. Major District Roads 131 and 135 connect to the Delhi–Agra Highway. The nearest railway station is Hodal which is around 20 kilometres (12 mi) from Punahana town. The closest railway station to the district headquarters, Nuh town, is 37 kilometres (23 mi) away in Palwal.

The planned route of the Delhi–Mumbai Expressway will pass west of Pinangwan town and is expected to boost connectivity to cities. Western Dedicated Freight Corridor passes through Sohna of this district.

== Notable people ==
- Hazrat Sheikh Musa, 13th century’s Sufi saint.
- Chaudhary Khurshid Ahmed (born 1934), former Member of the Lok Sabha, and former Cabinet Minister in the states of Haryana.
- Tayyab Husain (born 1936), former Member of the Lok Sabha, and former Cabinet Minister in the states of Punjab, Haryana, and Rajasthan.
- Chaudhary Rahim Khan (born 1923), former Member of the Lok Sabha and president of the All India Meo Sabha.
- Parvej Khan (born 2004), Indian track and field athlete.
- Salman Ali (born 1998), Indian playback singer.

== See also ==
- Dargah Hazrat Sheikh Musa
- Khanzadas of Mewat
- Mewat
- Hathin
- Hodal
