= Representation of the People Act, 1951 =

Act of the Parliament of India

Representation of People Act, 1951

Parliament of India
- Citation: Act No. 43 of 1951
- Territorial extent: Whole of India
- Enacted by: Parliament of India
- Commenced: 17 July 1951

Related legislation
- The Representation of People Act, 1950
- Status: In force

The Representation of the People Act, 1951 is an Act of the Parliament of India that provides for the conduct of elections to the Houses of Parliament and to the Houses of the legislatures of each state, the qualifications and disqualifications for membership, corrupt practices and electoral offences, and the resolution of election disputes. It was introduced in Parliament by law minister Dr. B. R. Ambedkar. The Act was enacted by the provisional Parliament under Article 327 of the Constitution of India, before the first general election.

== Background ==
An elected Constituent Assembly was set up on 9 December 1946 to frame the Constitution of India. Most provisions of the Constitution came into force on 26 January 1950, known as Republic Day. Transitional provisions under Part XXI enabled the functioning of a provisional Parliament, which enacted this Act for the first general elections held in 1951–52.

The basic qualification to represent the people is Indian citizenship and eligibility to vote under the Representation of the People Act, 1950.

== Amendments ==
The Act has been amended several times. Notable amendments include:

- The Representation of the People (Amendment) Act, 1966, which abolished election tribunals and transferred election petitions to the High Courts of India, with appeals lying to the Supreme Court of India.
- The Representation of the People (Amendment and Validation) Act, 2013.
- The Representation of the People (Amendment) Bill, 2016, introduced in the Lok Sabha.

== Application to constitutional offices ==
Registration of political parties is governed by Section 29A of this Act.

=== President ===
The Supreme Court of India decides disputes relating to presidential elections under Article 71 of the Constitution.

=== Vice president ===
Similar provisions apply to the Vice-President of India under Article 71.

=== Prime minister ===
The prime minister must remain qualified as a member of Parliament under this Act.

=== Speaker ===
The Speaker of the Lok Sabha may be disqualified if they cease to meet eligibility under the Act.

== Supreme Court rulings and RPA ==
In Lily Thomas v. Union of India (2013), the Supreme Court struck down Section 8(4) of the Act, making disqualification of convicted legislators immediate.

A subsequent ruling also restricted convicted legislators from contesting elections.

== Office of Profit ==
Elected representatives cannot hold an office of profit under Section 9(A) of the Act and Articles 102 and 191 of the Constitution.

== Section 8 ==
Section 8 deals with disqualification upon conviction for certain offences. The Supreme Court in Lily Thomas v. Union of India (2013) held that disqualification is immediate upon conviction.

As of recent proceedings, the Supreme Court has examined petitions regarding lifetime bans on convicted legislators.

== Some notable cases and instances ==
Indira Gandhi's election was set aside by the Allahabad High Court, leading to major constitutional developments.

Umlesh Yadav was disqualified by the Election Commission of India for suppression of election expenses.

Rahul Gandhi was disqualified following conviction in a criminal defamation case under Section 8(3), later reinstated after a stay by the Supreme Court.

== Provisions ==
The Act regulates political funding and requires disclosure of contributions above ₹20,000.
