= Yasin Khan =

Indian social reformer

Chaudhary Yasin Khan
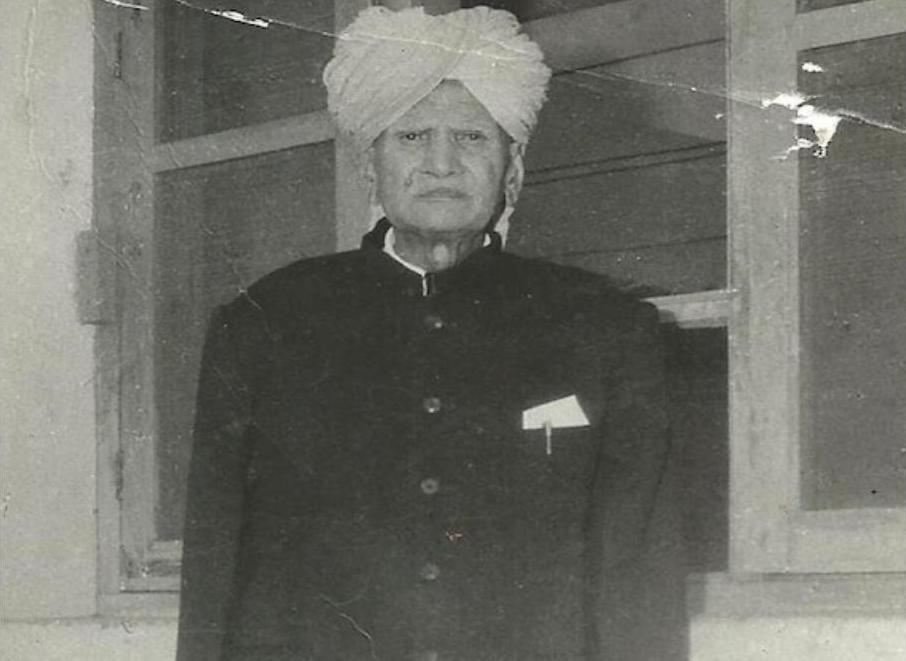

Member of the Punjab Legislative Assembly
- In office 1952–1962
- Constituency: Ferozepur Jhirka

Member of the Punjab Provincial Assembly
- In office 1926–1946
- Constituency: North-Western Gurgaon

Personal details
- Born: November 1, 1896 Village Rehna, Punjab Province, British India (present-day Nuh, Haryana, India)
- Party: Indian National Congress
- Other political affiliations: Unionist Party (until 1947)
- Children: Tayyab Husain (son), Hamid Hussain (son), Asgar Hussain (son)
- Education: Aligarh Muslim University
- Profession: Politician, advocate

Chaudhary Mohammad Yasin Khan Meo was an Indian politician, social reformer and a prominent leader in the Mewat region of India.

== Early life and education ==
Yasin Khan was born in 1896 in the village of Rehna in modern-day Nuh, Haryana. After experiencing the loss of his father at a young age, he was raised by an uncle who was revered as a spiritual Sufi leader. Yasin Khan excelled in academics and later pursued higher education at Aligarh Muslim University, becoming the first ever lawyer from the Mewat region.

== Political activism ==
Yasin Khan played a pivotal role as a member of the Punjab Legislative Assembly and the Punjab Provincial Assembly from the Ferozepur Jhirka constituency before 1946. He spearheaded initiatives to build infrastructure, including roads, schools, and hospitals, throughout Mewat.

Yasin Khan had met the freedom fighter, Sir Chhotu Ram, where he said the following quote to Khan:

What is Hindu for the Jat and Muslim for the Meo? We are all one.

— Sir Chhotu Ram

=== Role in Meo Uprising and Leadership ===
Yasin Khan emerged as a central figure during the Meo uprising of 1932 against the high agricultural taxes imposed by the Maharaja of Alwar, Jai Singh Prabhakar. He led efforts to negotiate with the authorities, eventually leading to a reduction in taxes and the exile of the Raja. This event elevated Yasin Khan's stature, earning him the title "Chaudhriyon ka Chaudhary," (lit. 'the Social Head of Social Heads') the leader of the Meo community.

=== Stance on Partition and Legacy ===
During the tumultuous period of Partition, Yasin Khan opposed the mass migration of Meos to Pakistan, fearing the loss of their land rights.

He was also responsible for bringing Mahatma Gandhi to Ghasera village in 1947 where allied with Gandhi, advocating for Meos to remain in India and emphasizing their crucial role in the nation's backbone. After his death, approximately one hundred thousand people assembled in Nuh to pay homage.

== Legacy ==
Yasin Khan's granddaughter, Anisa Rahim, wrote the book "An American Meo: A Tale of Remembering and Forgetting" in tribute and reference to her grandfather.
