= Taoru =

Tauru
- Town
- Taoru
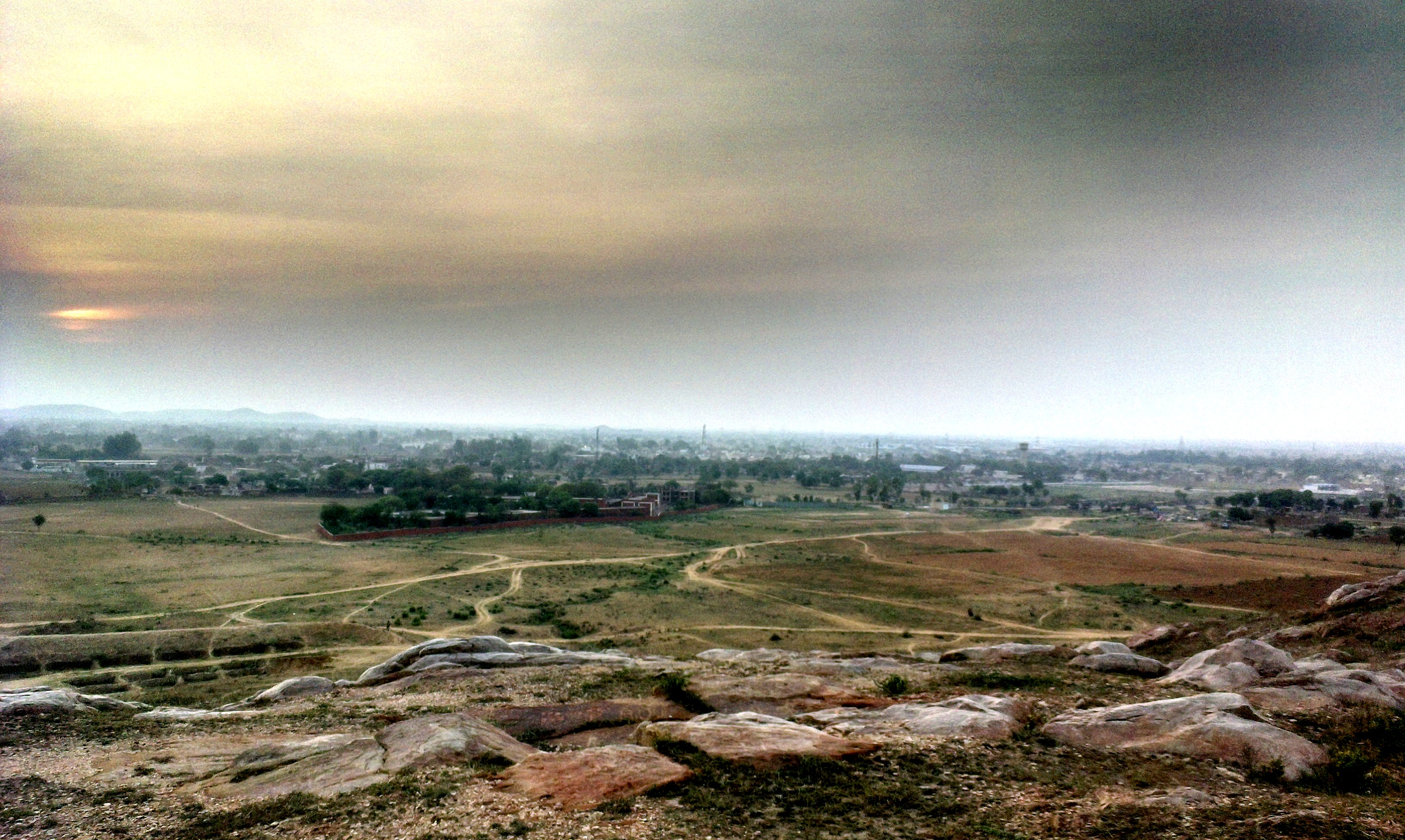
- Landscape of Taoru in Nuh district, Haryana.

- Location in Haryana, India Tauru (India)
- Coordinates: 28.22°N 76.95°E
- Country: India
- State: Haryana
- District: Nuh
- Established: =
- Elevation: 262 m (860 ft)

Population (2011)
  - Total: 22,599

Languages
  - Official: Hindi, Mewati, Ahirwati
- Time zone: UTC+5:30 (IST)
- PIN: 122105
- Telephone code: 01267
- ISO 3166 code: IN-HR
- Vehicle registration: HR 96
- Website: haryana.gov.in

Taoru or Tauru is a town, near Nuh city in Nuh district in the Indian state of Haryana.

== History ==
=== Fort ===
Fort of Taoru, also called Taoru Fort of Raja Nahar Singh, has chambers and rooms surrounded by high walls. It is presently used as a police station.

=== Taoru Tomb complex ===
Taoru Tomb Complex is a 3.5 acres (1.4 ha) walled tomb complex with 7 tombs, 2 of which has been restored by INTACH and Ansal University's Sushant School of Art and Architecture, of Tuglaq, Lodhi and Mughal architecture. It is rare in Delhi NCR region where multiple architectural styles of different eras are found in one complex itself. In 1828, The Imperial Gazetteer of India of the East India Company called this area "Lesser Balochistan", a likely reference to arrival of people from Balochistan during Lodhi era who might have been the rulers of Ferozepur Jhirka (a state which exited at least since Lodhi era which was later abolished by the British Raj in 1858 after the Rebellion of 1857) built these tombs during the successive dynasties. The largest tomb belongs to a Baloch. The complex located on Taoru-Sohna section of NH 919 is only 12 kilometres (7.5 mi) from the Delhi-Jaipur NH48. It is 40 kilometres (25 mi) from Gurgaon and 70 kilometres (43 mi) from Delhi.

In 2025, Haryana government announced a INR 95 crore restoration plan for upgrade of 20 monuments across the state including the Taoru tomb complex.

== Government ==
Taoru is part of the Sohna-Taoru Assembly constituency. Previously Taoru had its own Assembly constitiuency under its own name, Taoru. It is part of the Gurgaon Lok Sabha constituency.

== Geography ==
Taoru is located at 28.22°N 76.95°E. It has an average elevation of 262 metres (859 feet). It is surrounded by Aravalli Range from three sides.

It is reached by road from Dharuhera town of Rewari district that lies on NH 48 and from Sohna town of Gurgaon district. The Rewari-Dharuhera-Bhiwadi-Taoru-Sohna-Palwal road is called National Highway 919 (NH 919). Western Peripheral Expressway to Manesar or Palwal is approx 5 km from Taoru on NH 919.

== Demographics ==
As of 2001 India census, Taoru had a population of 17,227. Males constitute 53% of the population and females 47%. Taoru has an average literacy rate of 86.5%, higher than the national average of 69.5%: male literacy is 87%, and female literacy is 85%. In Taoru, 17% of the population is under 8 years of age.

Religion in Taoru Tehsil
Religion	Total Population	Percentage
Total	1,66,778	100%
Muslim	96,164	57.66%
Hindu	70,050	42.00%
Sikh	295	0.18%
Christian	177	0.11%
Not stated	55	0.03%
Jain	23	0.01%
Buddhist	14	0.01%
Other religions	0	0%

== Villages in Taoru Tehsil ==
There are 84 villages in Taoru Tehsil, namely:

Sikharpur, Buraka, Bhajlaka, Silkho, Chila, Sala-ka, Mala-ka, Mohmadpur, Pethredi, Hasanpur, Panchgaon, Chilawli, Charoda, Masit, Dhelamki, Nurpur, Bawla, Mandarka, Nanuka, Kangarka, Subasedi, Bhogipur, Didhara, Nijampur, Kalarpuri, Raniaki, Sewka, Gunawat, Chundika, Sunari, Khoire, Chote Khoire, Rathiwas, Uton, Jaurasi, Jhamwas, Fatepar, Kalwadi, Pada, Sekhpur, Gudha, Gudhi, Subras, Nanduki, Nihalgarh, Gogjaka, Goyla, Kalyaki, Sundh, Bhango, Jafrabad, Beri, Chahalka, Kharak Jalalpur, Khad Khadi, Rahadi, Nai Nangla, Dhulawat, Padheni, Khedki, Baghanki, Kota, Bissar, Sarai, Dadu, Dawla Pati etc.

== Schools ==
There are some private and government-run schools in Taoru. Chandravati Senior Secondary School, Hind High School, Janta High School, Government Senior Secondary School, Green Dales Public School, Spring Daisy Public School. One of these is Mewat Model School Taoru, which is run by Mewat Development Agency with the aim of eradicating various social issues such as poverty and social backwardness in the Mewat region.

== See also ==
- Hassanpur
- Mewat
- Gurgaon
- Sohna
- Bhiwadi
- Dharuhera
- Raniyaki
- Project Sarvoday
