= Udai Bhan =

Indian politician

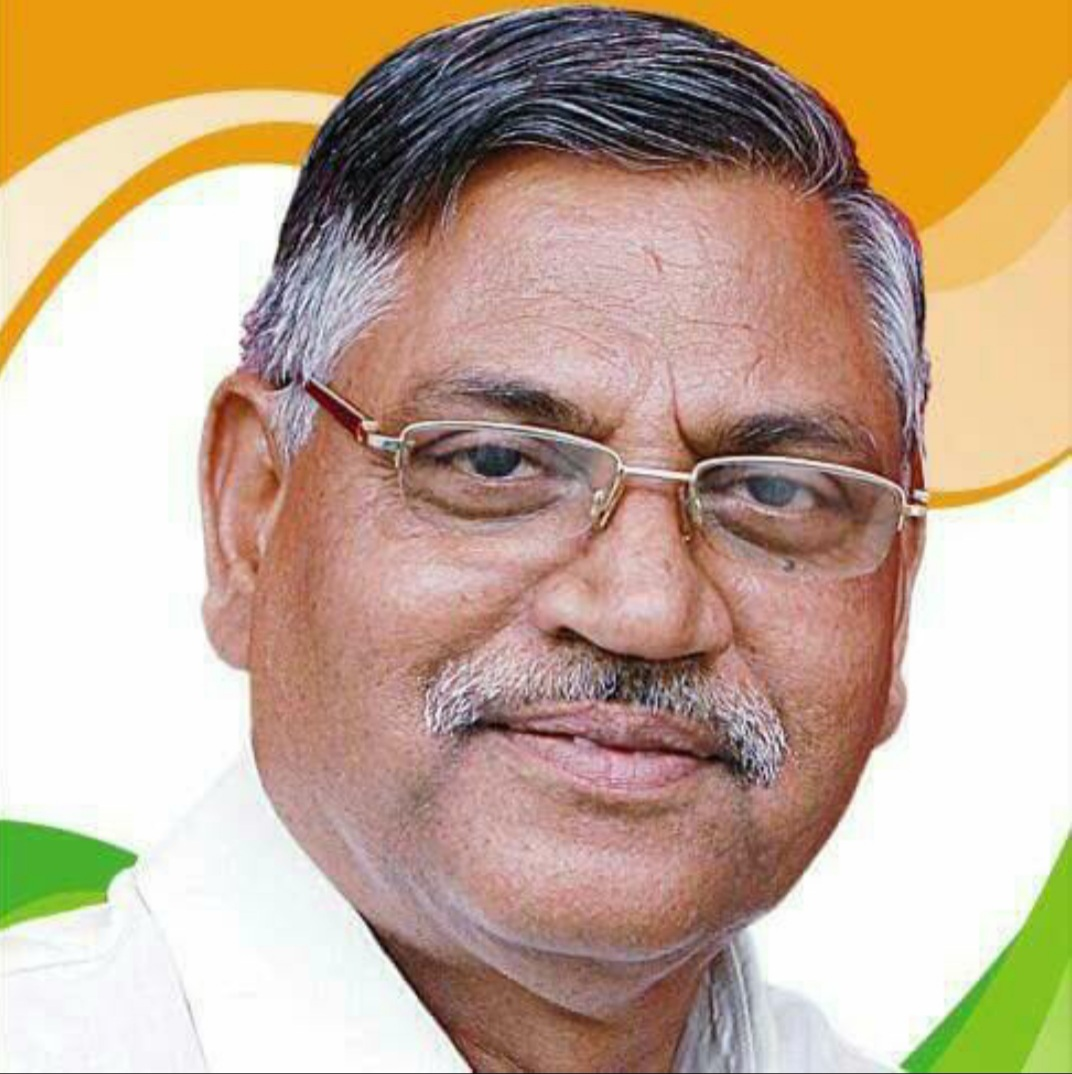

President of the Haryana Pradesh Congress Committee
- In office 27 April 2022 – 28 September 2025
- Preceded by: Selja Kumari
- Succeeded by: Rao Narendra Singh

Member of the Haryana Legislative Assembly
- In office October 2014 – October 2019
- Preceded by: Jagdish Nayar
- Succeeded by: Jagdish Nayar
- Constituency: Hodal
- In office 2000–2009
- Preceded by: Jagdish Nayar
- Succeeded by: Jagdish Nayar
- Constituency: Hassanpur

Personal details
- Born: 2 November 1955 (age 70) Hodal, Punjab, India (now in Haryana, India)
- Party: Indian National Congress
- Spouse: Shakuntala Devi
- Children: 4
- Parent: Gaya Lal

Udai Bhan (born 2 November 1955) is an Indian politician and a member of the Indian National Congress. He has been president of the Haryana Pradesh Congress Committee. He is former four-time elected Member of Haryana's Legislative Assembly (MLA). He represented Haryana's Hodal constituency from 2014 to 2019. He previously also represented the former constituency of Hassanpur in 1987, 2000 and 2005.

== Early life ==
Udai Bhan was born to Gaya Lal in the modern-day Palwal district of Haryana. His father was elected as a Member of the Haryana Legislative Assembly from the Hassanpur constituency multiple times.

In 1967, Udai Bhan's father, Gaya Lal, changed parties four times within one day. He was elected an independent candidate but he joined the Indian National Congress. Then he switched to the United Front, then back to Congress, and then within nine hours back to United Front again. When Gaya Lal decided to quit the United Front and join the Congress, then Congress leader Rao Birender Singh brought him to Chandigarh to attend a press conference. Rao Birender Singh declared "Aaya Ram Gaya Ram", based upon his name Gaya Lal.

The term "Aaya Ram Gaya Ram" became a well known expression in national Indian politics and is used within all regions of India to describe the act of frequent political defection. It is due to Gaya Lal's infamous incident that this term became prominent in the political vocabulary of India. In 1985, the Congress government amended the constitution to prevent such incidents under the Anti-defection law.

Ch. Udai Bhan's grandfather Dharam Singh was also a noted politician and was elected as the Chairman of Hodal Municipal Corporation several times between 1927 and 1942.

== Political career ==
Udai Bhan fought and won his first assembly election from Hassanpur in 1987 as a candidate of Lok Dal under the leadership of Chaudhary Devi Lal and won the seat twice thereafter — in 2000 as an Independent candidate and later in 2005 as a Congress candidate. Udai Bhan was the chairman of the Krishak Bharati Cooperative (KRIBHCO) between 1989 and 1993 and joined the Congress in 1997. Bhan won the Hodal (reserved) seat as a Congress candidate in 2014 but lost in the last assembly election to the BJP's Jagdish Nayar with a very small margin of 3,387 votes. He actively supported 2020–2021 Indian farmers' protest which was a protest against three farm acts that were passed by the Parliament of India in September 2020. On 19 November 2021, the union government decided to repeal the bills,[64] and both houses of Parliament passed the Farm Laws Repeal Bill, 2021 on 29 November.

In April 2022 Udai Bhan was appointed as the new State President of Haryana unit of Indian National Congress.

== Personal life ==
Udai Bhan is married to Shakuntala Devi and they have three sons and one daughter. Bhan's younger son Raj Gopal and his youngest son Devesh Kumar have also been in public life and been associated with the Congress. Udai Bhan's younger son Raj Gopal served as chairman, Municipal Council, Hodal, from 2016 to 2019.

== See also ==
- Chamar
- Ravidassia
