= Praveen Dagar =

Indian politician

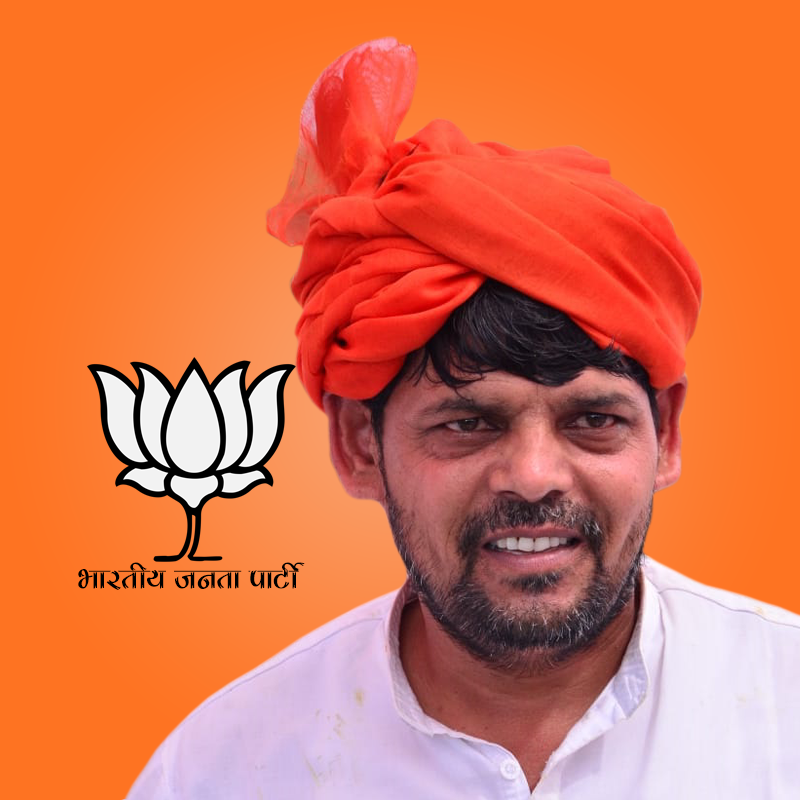
- Dagar in 2020

Member of Haryana Legislative Assembly
- In office 14 November 2019 – 2024
- Preceded by: Kehar Singh Rawat
- Succeeded by: Mohammad Israil
- Constituency: Hathin

Personal details
- Born: 1 January 1976 (age 50) Mandkola, Haryana
- Party: Bharatiya Janata Party
- Parent(s): Ramji Lal Dagar; Veerwati
- Occupation: Politician

Praveen Dagar is an Indian politician and member of the Bharatiya Janata Party. He was elected as a Member of the Haryana Legislative Assembly from the Hathin constituency in the 2019 Haryana Legislative Assembly election.

== Early life ==
Praveen Dagar was born on 1 January 1976 in Mandkola located in Hathin of Palwal district of Haryana, in a farmer family. His father Shri Ramji Lal Dagar is a farmer and politician who was known as a farmer leader and became an independent MLA in 1972. He started his political career by raising local issues of farmers and won his first election of Zila Parishad in 2005.

== Education ==
Praveen Dagar completed his early education from Mandkola village. He completed his graduation from Maharshi Dayanand University, Rohtak. After completing his graduation he started taking part in local politics and raising local issues.

== Political life ==
In 2005, he entered politics as a farmer leader and raised local farmers' issues. He fought the Zila Parishad election and won his first election in 2005. This was starting off his political career and since then he is active in politics. In 2019 he got the ticket from Bharatiya Janata Party from Hathin assembly constituency and won his first election as Member of the Haryana Legislative Assembly .
