= Hassanpur =

- township
- Location in Haryana, India Hassanpur (India)
- Coordinates: 27.97888°N 77.49239°E
- Country: India
- State: Haryana
- District: Palwal

Population (2011)
  - Total: 11,569

Languages
  - Official: Hindi
- Time zone: UTC+5:30 (IST)
- PIN: 121107
- Telephone code: 01275
- ISO 3166 code: IN-HR
- Vehicle registration: HR
- Website: haryana.gov.in

Hassanpur is a municipal town and sub-tehsil in Palwal district in the Indian state of Haryana in Delhi NCR.

== History ==
Hassanpur is part of the Braj region associated with the Mahabharata and the early life of Lord Krishna. The wider area around Hasanpur and the Yamuna banks contains traces of ancient Painted Grey Ware (PGW) culture, signaling continuous human habitation from the Vedic and Post-Vedic Classical India periods.

During the 17th century, the broader Palwal and Mewat region witnessed severe friction between the local Jat and Mewati peasant populations and the Mughals under Emperor Aurangzeb.

During British colonial rule, when Hasanpur and Palwal areas were part of the Gurgaon district in the Punjab Province, the Hasanpur and the surrounding villages actively participated in the 1857 First War of Independence. Following the suppression of the revolt, the British carried out harsh reprisals in the region, executing several natives.

After the 1947 partition of India and the subsequent reorganization of states, Hasanpur remained in Haryana state. On 15 August 1979, when Gurgaon district was divided, Hasanpur and the rest of the Palwal region became part of the newly created Faridabad district. On 15 August 2008, Palwal was officially carved out as Haryana’s 21st district and Hasanpur was designated as one of its sub-tehsils.

== Demographics ==
As of 2011 census of India, Hassanpur had a population of 11569. Males constitute 53% of the population and females 47%. Hassanpur has an average literacy rate of 60%, lower than the national average of 74.4%. In Hassanpur, 16.4 of the population is under 6 years of age.

== Education ==
=== Schools ===
- Aadrash Vidya Mandir Sr Secondary School
- B.L. Public senior secondary School
- Brij Mandal Senior secondary school
- Govt High Senior secondary school for girls
- Govt High Senior secondary school for girls
- KCM Public School
- Janta Vidya Mandir
- Sarasvati Vidya Mandir Sr Secondary School
- Maa Omwati
- SRS Public School

=== College ===
- Maa Omwati Degree college
- Maa Omwati Institute Of Management.

== Transport ==
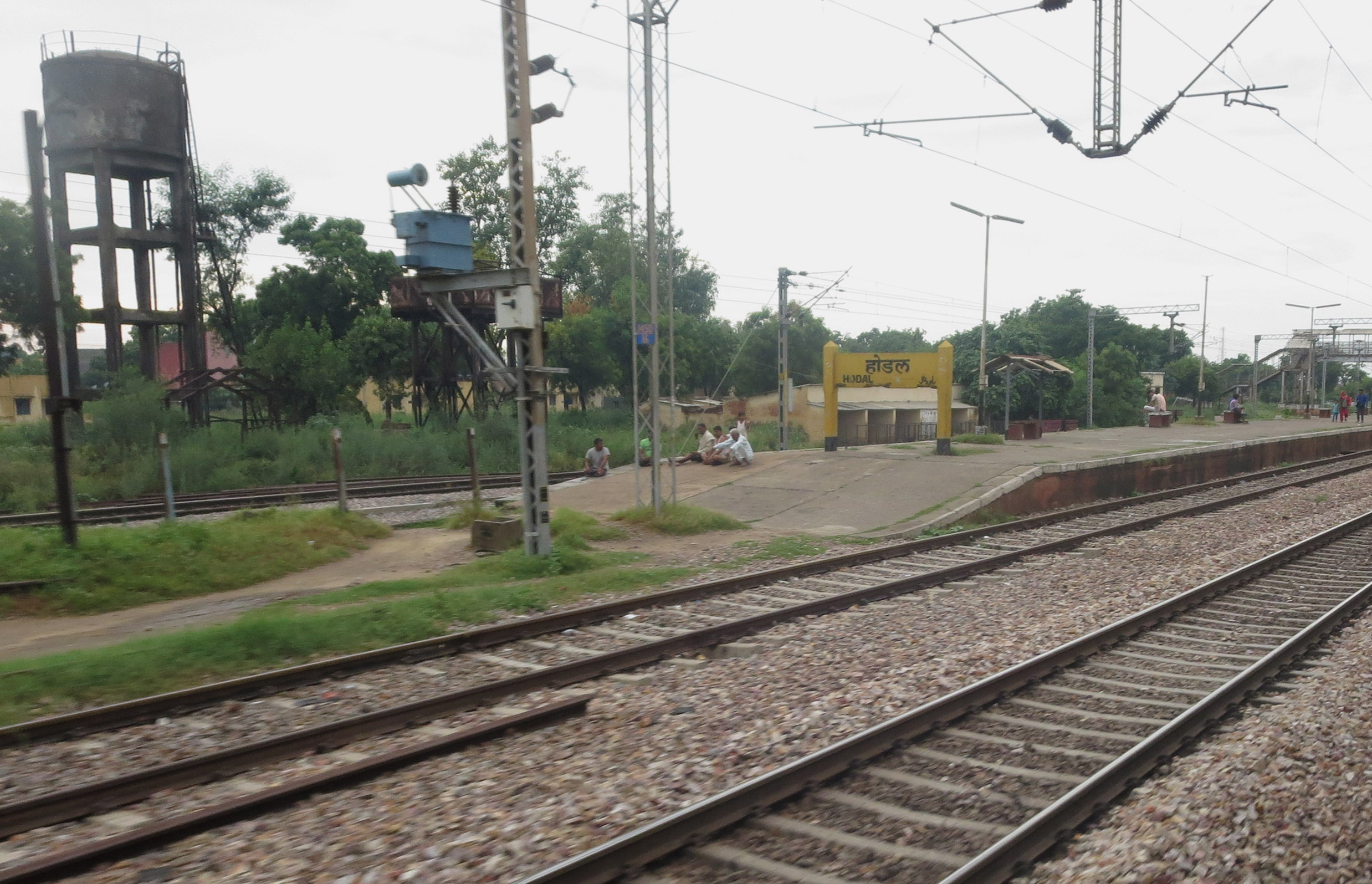
Hodal railway station.

=== Air ===
Nearest airports are Noida International Airport 45 km northeast, IGI Delhi 100 km northwest, Hindon Airport 110 km north.

=== Rail ===
Nearest railway stations are Hodal and Palwal on New Delhi–Howrah main line.

=== Road ===
Hasangarh is 25 km southeast of WPE towards Palwal and 15 km northwest of Hodal, both Palwal and Hodal lie on NH44.

Hasanpur Bridge, ₹200 crore project over the Yamuna River between Hasanpur in Haryana and Malav in Uttar Pradesh, provides shorter and faster connectivity to Aligarh, Khurja and Noida Airport. Braj Chaurasi Kos Parikrama (84 Kos Yatra) passes over this bridge.

== Notable People from Hassanpur ==
- Girraj Kishore Mahaur, Former MLA of Hasanpur

== See also ==
- List of tehsils of Haryana
