= Aaya Ram Gaya Ram =

Indian term for changing party allegiance

Aaya Ram Gaya Ram (lit. 'Ram has come, Ram has gone') is a Hindi expression referring to turncoats, who switch parties in the context of a legislative body. The term originated in 1967 in Haryana when the Member of the Legislative Assembly Gaya Lal shifted his party allegiances thrice within two weeks. Lal’s behavior eventually resulted in the imposition of President’s rule in Haryana later that year. Further pressure resulted in the passage of an anti-defection law in 1985. However, the practice of defection is still found today in state legislatures in India, albeit to a more limited extent.

== Origin of the term ==
The term was coined when Gaya Lal, a Member of the Legislative Assembly from the Hassanpur constituency (now Hodal) in Haryana, won elections as an independent candidate in 1967 and joined the Indian National Congress, and thereafter changed parties thrice in a fortnight, first by politically defecting from the Indian National Congress to the United Front, then counter defecting back to INC, and then defecting for the final time to the United Front. When Gaya Lal quit the United Front to join the INC, then INC leader Rao Birendra Singh, who had engineered Gaya Lal's defection to the INC, brought Gaya Lal to a press conference at Chandigarh and declared "Gaya Ram was now Aya Ram". This resulted in significant turmoil, eventually resulting in the dissolution of the Haryana Legislative Assembly and the imposition of President's rule.

Lal continued to switch parties to his last days. He contested legislative assembly elections in Haryana under the Akhil Bhartiya Arya Sabha in 1972, and joined the Bhartiya Lok Dal under Chaudhary Charan Singh in 1974. He won the seat as a Janata Party candidate in 1977 after the Lok Dal merged with the Janata Party.

== The Anti-defection law ==
The Anti-Defection Act was passed in 1985 to prevent such defections. It was chartered by the government of Rajiv Gandhi as the Tenth Schedule of the Constitution of India.

The Anti-Defection Act, applicable to both Parliament and state assemblies, specifies the process for the Presiding Officer of a legislature (Speaker) to disqualify a legislators on grounds of defection based on a petition by any other member of the House. Defection is defined as either voluntarily giving up the membership of his party or disobeying (abstaining or voting against) the directives (political whip) of the party leadership on a vote in legislature. Legislators can change their party without the risk of disqualification to merge with or into another party provided that at least two-thirds of the legislators are in favour of the merger, neither the members who decide to merge, nor the ones who stay with the original party will face disqualification. The Supreme Court mandated that in the absence of a formal resignation, the giving up of membership can be determined by the conduct of a legislator, such as publicly expressing opposition to their party or support for another party, engaging in anti-party activities, criticizing the party on public forums on multiple occasions, and attending rallies organised by opposition parties. The Presiding Officer has no time limit to make his decision, for example if less than two third legislators of party defect then the Presiding Officer can use his discretion to either disqualify the legislators before a vote of no confidence is held or delay the decision on disqualification until after the "vote of no confidence" is held. In another example, if less than two third legislators of party defect together in more than one batch in such a way that the combined strength of the united defectors is more than two third before the decision on the defection is made, the Presiding Officer can use his discretion to either disqualify each batch of the defecting legislators or accept the combined batches of the defectors as the legal defection (no disqualification). This allows a possibility of the misuse by the Presiding Officer to benefit a specific party through further horse-trading (counter-defections), formation of unholy alliances or electoral fraud by exploiting the loopholes in the existing anti-defection laws. However, the decision of the Presiding Officer is subject to the judicial review by courts.

== See also ==
- Aisle (political term)
- Conscience vote
- Frog (Malaysian politics)
- Keep the bastards honest
- Political nepotism
- Transformism, flexible centrist coalition government by unification of the extreme left and right
- Whip (politics), voting against the party line is known as "defying the whip"
