= Hathin Assembly constituency =

Legislative Assembly constituency in Haryana State, India

Coordinates: 28.04°N 77.23°E

Hathin
- Constituency No. 82 for the Haryana Legislative Assembly

Constituency details
- Country: India
- Region: North India
- State: Haryana
- District: Palwal
- Lok Sabha constituency: Faridabad
- Total electors: 2,40,570
- Reservation: None

Member of Legislative Assembly
- 15th Haryana Legislative Assembly
- Incumbent Mohammad Israil
- Party: INC
- Elected year: 2024

Hathin is one of the 90 Legislative Assembly constituencies of Haryana state in India.

It is part of Palwal district.

== Members of the Legislative Assembly ==
Year	Name	Party
1967	Devi Singh Tewatia	Indian National Congress
1968	Hem Raj Sehrawat	Independent politician
1972	Ramji Lal Dagar	Independent politician
1977	Aditya Vesh	Janata Party
1982	Azmat Khan	Janata Party
1987	Bhagwan Shai Rawat	Haryana Lok Dal
1991	Ajmat Khan	Indian National Congress
1996	Chaudhary Harsh Sorout	Haryana Vikas Party
2000	Bhagwan Sahai Rawat	Indian National Lok Dal
2005	Harsh Sorout	Independent
2009	Jaleb Khan	Independent
2014	Kehar Singh Rawat	Indian National Lok Dal
2019	Praveen Dagar	Bharatiya Janata Party
2024	Mohammad Israil	Indian National Congress

== Election results ==
=== Assembly Election 2024 ===
2024 Haryana Legislative Assembly election: Hathin
Party	Candidate	Votes	%	±%
INC	Mohd Israil	79,907	42.45%	▲15.07
BJP	Manoj Kumar	47,511	25.24%	▼3.95
INLD	Tayyub Hussain	37,843	20.10%	▲18.96
Independent	Dharmendra Tewatia	10,494	5.57%	New
JJP	Ravinder Kumar	5,699	3.03%	▼15.91
Independent	Kehar Singh	4,945	2.63%	New
AAP	Rajendra Singh Rawat	1,055	0.56%	New
NOTA	None of the Above	432	0.23%	New
Margin of victory		32,396	17.21%	▲15.41
Turnout		1,88,238	78.22%	▲1.57
Registered electors		2,40,570		▲15.17
INC gain from BJP		Swing	▲13.26	

=== Assembly Election 2019 ===
2019 Haryana Legislative Assembly election: Hathin
Party	Candidate	Votes	%	±%
BJP	Praveen Dagar	46,744	29.19%	▲3.88
INC	Mohammad Israil S/O Jaleb Khan	43,857	27.38%	▲6.74
BSP	Tayyab Hussain Bhimsika	35,233	22.00%	▲1.39
JJP	Harsh Kumar	30,334	18.94%	New
INLD	Rani Devi	1,828	1.14%	▼28.37
Margin of victory		2,887	1.80%	▼2.40
Turnout		1,60,163	76.65%	▼4.60
Registered electors		2,08,945		▲12.09
BJP gain from INLD		Swing	▼0.33	

=== Assembly Election 2014 ===
2014 Haryana Legislative Assembly election: Hathin
Party	Candidate	Votes	%	±%
INLD	Kehar Singh	44,703	29.52%	▲10.62
BJP	Harsh Kumar	35000	25.31%	▲24.78
INC	Chaudhary Jaleb Khan	31,270	20.65%	▼3.25
BSP	Tayub Husain Urf Nazir Ahmed	31,214	20.61%	▲15.42
HJC(BL)	Ramesh Chand	1,719	1.13%	▼1.11
Independent	Bhoop Singh	1,422	0.94%	New
Margin of victory		6,372	4.21%	▼1.46
Turnout		1,51,455	81.25%	▲4.47
Registered electors		1,86,402		▲25.30
INLD gain from Independent		Swing	▼0.05	

=== Assembly Election 2009 ===
2009 Haryana Legislative Assembly election: Hathin
Party	Candidate	Votes	%	±%
Independent	Chaudhary Jaleb Khan	33,774	29.57%	New
INC	Harsh Kumar	27,301	23.90%	▼2.10
INLD	Kehar Singh	21,578	18.89%	▼6.57
Independent	Ramji Lal	15,634	13.69%	New
BSP	Nasima	5,927	5.19%	▲1.47
Independent	Ajmat Khan	3,296	2.89%	New
HJC(BL)	Dr. Shakti Singh Rawat	2,563	2.24%	New
Independent	Indraj	1,709	1.50%	New
Independent	Ser Mohammad @ Shera	683	0.60%	New
BJP	Tekchand Sorot	602	0.53%	▼3.79
Margin of victory		6,473	5.67%	▼4.29
Turnout		1,14,224	76.78%	▲5.68
Registered electors		1,48,764		▲19.30
Independent hold		Swing	▼6.39	

=== Assembly Election 2005 ===
2005 Haryana Legislative Assembly election: Hathin
Party	Candidate	Votes	%	±%
Independent	Harsh Kumar	31,879	35.96%	New
INC	Chaudhary Jaleb Khan	23,049	26.00%	▲5.59
INLD	Azmat Khan	22,570	25.46%	▼4.00
BJP	Bhagwan Sahai Rawat	3,825	4.31%	New
BSP	Kailash Chand Gupta Bahin	3,298	3.72%	▼1.12
RLD	Ratan Singh Sorot	3,253	3.67%	New
Independent	Deenu	457	0.52%	New
Margin of victory		8,830	9.96%	▲8.28
Turnout		88,657	71.10%	▼5.06
Registered electors		1,24,694		▲17.64
Independent gain from INLD		Swing	▲6.50	

=== Assembly Election 2000 ===
2000 Haryana Legislative Assembly election: Hathin
Party	Candidate	Votes	%	±%
INLD	Bhagwan Sahai Rawat	23,777	29.46%	New
HVP	Harsh Kumar	22,423	27.78%	▲4.27
INC	Ajmat Khan	16,471	20.41%	▲14.83
RPI	Yudhbir Singh Zaildar	8,822	10.93%	New
Independent	Jogender	4,773	5.91%	New
BSP	Daler Singh	3,908	4.84%	▼3.19
Margin of victory		1,354	1.68%	▼7.18
Turnout		80,720	77.51%	▲11.06
Registered electors		1,05,994		▼0.21
INLD gain from HVP		Swing	▲5.95	

=== Assembly Election 1996 ===
1996 Haryana Legislative Assembly election: Hathin
Party	Candidate	Votes	%	±%
HVP	Harsh Kumar	16,252	23.51%	New
AIIC(T)	Ajmat Khan	10,131	14.65%	New
Independent	Chaudhary Jaleb Khan	10,069	14.56%	New
SAP	Mahendra	9,268	13.40%	New
JD	Bhagwan Sahai Rawat	7,465	10.80%	▼13.02
BSP	Liyakat Ali @ Vilayat Ali	5,553	8.03%	New
INC	Daya Chaudhary	3,855	5.58%	▼22.77
Independent	Islam Alias Islamudin	3,025	4.38%	New
Independent	Birender Singh	870	1.26%	New
Independent	Mohd. Usman	687	0.99%	New
Margin of victory		6,121	8.85%	▲4.32
Turnout		69,142	68.11%	▲0.69
Registered electors		1,06,213		▲6.27
HVP gain from INC		Swing	▼4.84	

=== Assembly Election 1991 ===
1991 Haryana Legislative Assembly election: Hathin
Party	Candidate	Votes	%	±%
INC	Ajmat Khan	18,250	28.35%	▲12.44
JD	Bhagwan Saye	15,334	23.82%	New
Independent	Harsh Kumar	13,959	21.68%	New
JP	Shiv Ram	11,525	17.90%	New
BJP	Ved Ram	4,462	6.93%	New
Margin of victory		2,916	4.53%	▼7.07
Turnout		64,375	67.59%	▼4.13
Registered electors		99,945		▲9.17
INC gain from LKD		Swing	▲0.84	

=== Assembly Election 1987 ===
1987 Haryana Legislative Assembly election: Hathin
Party	Candidate	Votes	%	±%
LKD	Bhagwan Shai	17,260	27.51%	▲3.04
INC	Ramji Lal	9,984	15.91%	▼7.74
Independent	Harsh Kumar	9,577	15.26%	New
Independent	Azmat Khan	8,527	13.59%	New
Independent	Zalab Khan	5,349	8.52%	New
Independent	Yogender Singh	4,206	6.70%	New
Independent	Noor Mohmad Mewati	2,685	4.28%	New
VHP	Khillan Singh	1,846	2.94%	New
Independent	Aditiya Vesh	1,614	2.57%	New
Independent	Ismali Khan	499	0.80%	New
Margin of victory		7,276	11.60%	▲11.26
Turnout		62,747	69.89%	▲2.19
Registered electors		91,554		▲17.47
LKD gain from JP		Swing	▲2.70	

=== Assembly Election 1982 ===
1982 Haryana Legislative Assembly election: Hathin
Party	Candidate	Votes	%	±%
JP	Azmat Khan	12,828	24.81%	▼10.47
LKD	Khillan Singh	12,655	24.47%	New
INC	Ramji Lal	12,230	23.65%	▲11.78
Independent	Wali Mohammed	7,800	15.08%	New
Independent	Bhagwan Sahai Rawat	3,954	7.65%	New
Independent	Sanshonu Ansari	587	1.14%	New
Independent	Chhutmal	329	0.64%	New
Margin of victory		173	0.33%	▼21.78
Turnout		51,712	67.43%	▲1.51
Registered electors		77,939		▲17.43
JP hold		Swing	▼10.47	

=== Assembly Election 1977 ===
1977 Haryana Legislative Assembly election: Hathin
Party	Candidate	Votes	%	±%
JP	Aditya Vesh	15,182	35.28%	New
Independent	Chhutmal	5,665	13.16%	New
INC	Prabhu Dayal	5,107	11.87%	▼17.39
Independent	Basir	4,751	11.04%	New
Independent	Hem Raj	3,744	8.70%	New
Independent	Rajinder Singh	2,358	5.48%	New
Independent	Net Ram	1,985	4.61%	New
Independent	Dal Singh	1,794	4.17%	New
Independent	Roop Chand	1,242	2.89%	New
Independent	Mohd. Lakdir	828	1.92%	New
Margin of victory		9,517	22.12%	▲11.80
Turnout		43,033	65.85%	▼2.41
Registered electors		66,372		▲2.87
JP gain from Independent		Swing	▼4.30	

=== Assembly Election 1972 ===
1972 Haryana Legislative Assembly election: Hathin
Party	Candidate	Votes	%	±%
Independent	Ramji Lal	17,173	39.58%	New
INC	Hem Raj	12,697	29.26%	▲0.54
Independent	Sufed Khan	10,680	24.61%	New
Independent	Suleman	1,632	3.76%	New
Independent	Jiwan Khan	1,210	2.79%	New
Margin of victory		4,476	10.32%	▲10.04
Turnout		43,392	69.18%	▲22.91
Registered electors		64,523		▲12.39
Independent hold		Swing	▲10.58	

=== Assembly Election 1968 ===
1968 Haryana Legislative Assembly election: Hathin
Party	Candidate	Votes	%	±%
Independent	Hem Raj	7,381	28.99%	New
INC	Debi Singh Tewatia	7,311	28.72%	▼21.46
VHP	Suleman	6,113	24.01%	New
SWA	Safed Khan	3,442	13.52%	▲11.84
ABJS	Bishnu Datt Sharma	1,210	4.75%	New
Margin of victory		70	0.27%	▼24.17
Turnout		25,457	46.13%	▼18.40
Registered electors		57,412		▲0.87
Independent gain from INC		Swing	▼21.19	

=== Assembly Election 1967 ===
1967 Haryana Legislative Assembly election: Hathin
Party	Candidate	Votes	%	±%
INC	D. Singh	17,921	50.18%	New
Independent	Rajinder Singh	9,190	25.73%	New
Independent	Wali Mohammed	8,001	22.40%	New
SWA	O. Singh	599	1.68%	New
Margin of victory		8,731	24.45%	
Turnout		35,711	67.57%	
Registered electors		56,915		
INC win (new seat)				

== See also ==
- List of constituencies of the Haryana Legislative Assembly
- Palwal district
