= Rasulpur, Haryana =

- village
- Location in Haryana, India Rasulpur, Haryana (India)
- Coordinates: 28.087230°N 77.400881°E
- Country: India
- State: Haryana
- District: Palwal district
- ISO 3166 code: IN-HR
- Website: haryana.gov.in

Rasulpur is a village and gram panchayat in the state of Haryana, district Palwal in northern India. It belongs to Gurgaon Division. Village is about 10 kilometres from Palwal City on the Hasanpur road. Village also connected with to Palwal-Aligarh Road.

== Demography ==
Rasulpur Village has a total population of 4373 as per Population Census 2011.

== See also ==
- Bhidauni
- Mandkola
