= Gaurav Gautam =

Indian politician

Minister of State, Government of Haryana
- Incumbent
- Assumed office 17 October 2024
- Governor: Bandaru Dattatreya
- Chief Minister: Nayab Singh Saini
- Ministry and Departments: Youth Empowerment & Entrepreneurship (IC); Sports (IC); Law & Legislative (Attached)
- Preceded by: Nayab Singh Saini

Member of Haryana Legislative Assembly
- Incumbent
- Assumed office 8 October 2024
- Preceded by: Deepak Mangla
- Constituency: Palwal Assembly constituency

Personal details
- Party: Bharatiya Janata Party
- Spouse: Rinki Gautam
- Profession: Politician

Gaurav Gautam is an Indian politician from Haryana. He is currently serving as a minister of state Youth Empowerment & Entrepreneurship (IC) Sports (IC) Law & Legislative (Attached) Department, Government of Haryana. He is member of the Haryana Legislative Assembly from 2024, representing Palwal Assembly constituency as a member of the Bharatiya Janata Party.

== Early life and background ==
Born in 1988, Gaurav Gautam comes from a middle-class family in Haryana. His father, Shri Hari Prakash Gautam, was a vice chairman in the Labor Department of the Haryana government. His mother, Ratan gautam, initially worked as an Anganwadi worker in the Women and Child Development Department of Haryana before becoming a homemaker.

=== Education ===
Gautam holds a PhD in journalism, demonstrating his academic commitment to understanding communication and social dynamics.

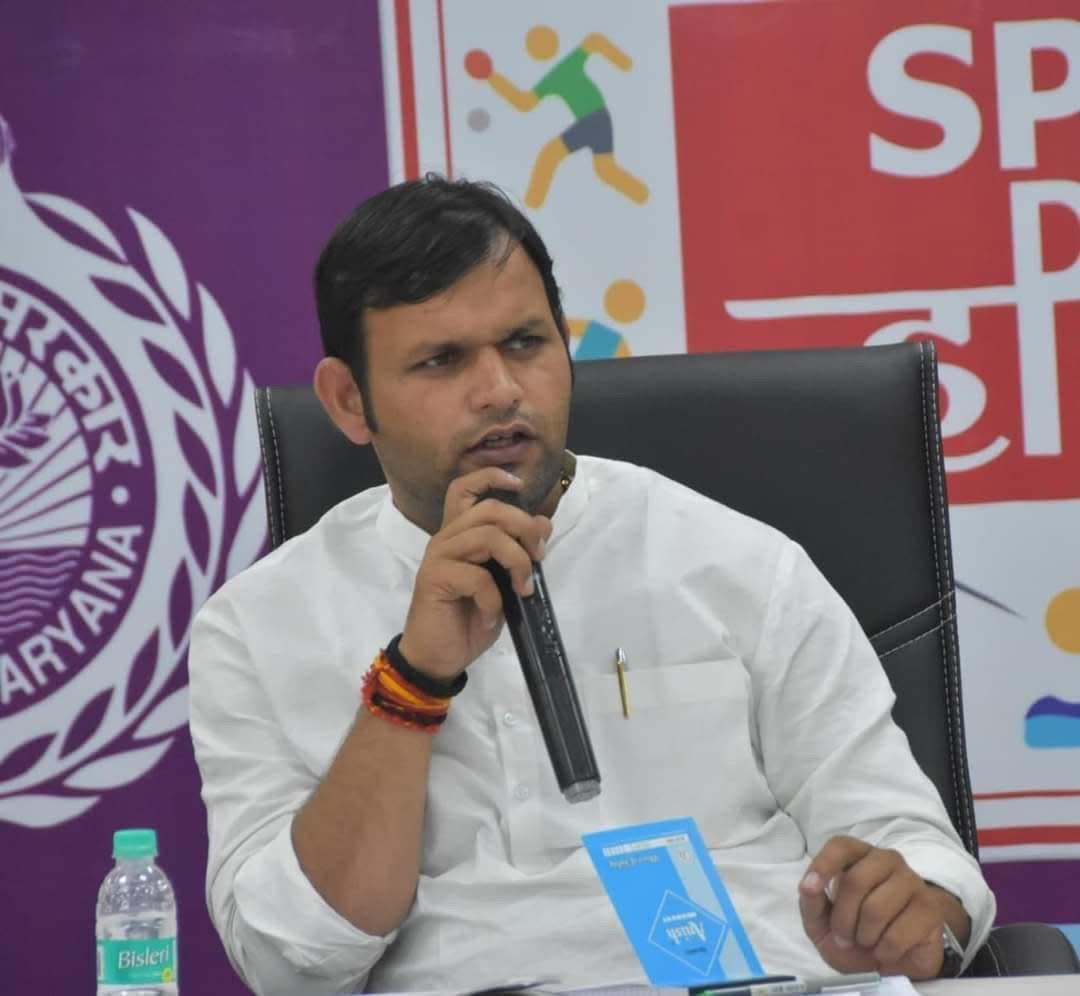

== Political career ==
=== Early Political Involvement ===
Gautam's political journey began in 2014 when he started working as a representative of Member of Parliament Krishan Pal Gurjar from the Faridabad parliamentary constituency. During this period, he gained significant recognition for addressing local issues and connecting with the public.

==== Bharatiya Janata Yuva Morcha Leadership ====
His leadership capabilities led to his appointment as the in-charge of the Bharatiya Janata Yuva Morcha (BJYM) in several states, including:

- Chhattisgarh

- Maharashtra

- Gujarat

In these roles, he was instrumental in connecting youth to the party's ideology and expanding the party's grassroots support.

=== Mentorship ===
Rajya Sabha MP Anil Jain was Gautam's political mentor, who significantly influenced his political approach and organizational skills.

=== 2024 Legislative Assembly Elections ===
In the 2024 Haryana Legislative Assembly elections, Gautam contested from the Palwal constituency. He won a historic victory against five-time MLA Chaudhary Karan Singh Dalal, who was considered a prominent leader in South Haryana.

=== Ministerial Position ===
Following his electoral success, Gautam was appointed a minister of state (independent charge) in the Haryana government under Chief Minister Nayab Singh Saini, handling the portfolios of Sports, Youth Affairs, and Law.

Gaurav Gautam's political journey made him an emerging leader in Haryana's political landscape.

== See also ==
- 2024 Haryana Legislative Assembly election
- Haryana Legislative Assembly
- Palwal Assembly Constituency
