= Party switching =

Changing of political parties by elected officials

Party switching or party hopping is any change in political party affiliation of a partisan public figure, usually one currently holding elected office. Party switching occurs quite commonly in Brazil, Canada, India, Indonesia, Italy, Malaysia, Romania, Ukraine, and the Philippines.

== Australia ==
It is rare in Australia for a member of a major party to switch to another political party, especially to another major party. It is more common for a member of parliament to become an independent or form their own minor political party. Notable individual party switchers at federal level include:

- Agnes Robertson – Liberal to Country, 1955
- Don Chipp – Liberal to Democrats (new party), 1977
- Peter Richardson – Liberal to Progress, 1977
- John Siddons and David Vigor – Democrats to Unite Australia (new party), 1987
- Cheryl Kernot – Democrats to Labor, 1997
- John Bradford – Liberal to Christian Democrats, 1998
- Julian McGauran – Liberal to National, 2006
- Cory Bernardi – Liberal to Conservatives, 2017
- Craig Kelly – Liberal to United Australia Party, 2021
- George Christensen – Liberal National to One Nation, 2022

Mass defections took place on some occasions in the 20th century due to Australian Labor Party (ALP) splits – in 1916 (to the National Labor Party, including the sitting prime minister Billy Hughes), in 1931 (to Lang Labor), in 1940 (to the Non-Communist Labor Party), and in 1955 (to the Anti-Communist Labor Party).

During the 2024 Tasmanian state election Liberal Premier Jeremy Rockliff announced an intention to amend the Tasmanian Constitution to add a clause that would legislate that if an MP left the party on which they were elected, they would vacate their seat of parliament. This would make Tasmania the only state with such a clause.

== India ==
In India before 1985, switching party was common.

Aaya Ram Gaya Ram (English: Ram has come, Ram has gone) expression in politics of India means the frequent floor-crossing, turncoating, switching parties and political horse trading in the legislature by the elected politicians and political parties. The term originated in 1967 in Haryana where excessive political horse trading, counter horse trading and counter-counter horse trading took place; triggering several rounds of frequent political defections by the serial-turncoat politicians within a span of few weeks; resulting in the dissolution of the Haryana Legislative Assembly and consequently the fresh elections were held in 1968. It became the subject of numerous jokes and cartoons. After 1967, several parties in India often continued to be involved in this type of political horse-trading to grab the power.

To end this trend, the anti-defection law was made in 1985. The trend still continues to surface every now and then, by exploiting the loopholes in existing anti-defection laws to benefit a specific party through further horse-trading, counter-defections, formation of unholy alliances and electoral fraud. This misuse, by the collusion of corrupt politicians/parties with the partisan Speaker and/or Governor, can be somewhat prevented by the political opponents (losing side in the political intrigue) by going to the court for immediate intervention.

The term was coined when Gaya Lal, a Member of the Legislative Assembly from Hodal in Haryana, won elections as an independent candidate in 1967 and joined the Indian National Congress, and thereafter he changed parties thrice in a fortnight, first by politically defecting from the Indian National Congress to the United Front, then counter defecting back to INC, and then counter-counter-defected within nine hours to United Front again. When Gaya Lal quit the United Front and join the INC, then INC leader Rao Birendra Singh who had engineered Gaya Lal's defection to INC, brought Gaya Lal to a press conference at Chandigarh and declared "Gaya Ram was now Aya Ram". This triggered the worst cyclic game of the political defections, the counter-defections, the counter-counter-defections, and so on, eventually resulting in the dissolution of the Haryana Legislative Assembly and the President's rule was imposed.

1985 Anti-defection Act was passed in 1985 to prevent such defections. It was included in constitution by Rajiv Gandhi government as the tenth schedule of Indian constitution.

The Anti-defection Act, applicable to both Parliament and state assemblies, specifies the process for the Presiding Officer of a legislature (Speaker) to disqualify a legislators on grounds of defection based on a petition by any other member of the House. Defection is defined as either voluntarily giving up the membership of his party or disobeying (abstaining or voting against) the directives (political whip) of the party leadership on a vote in legislature. Legislators can change their party without the risk of disqualification to merge with or into another party provided that at least two-thirds of the legislators are in favour of the merger, neither the members who decide to merge, nor the ones who stay with the original party will face disqualification. The Supreme Court mandated that in the absence of a formal resignation, the giving up of membership can be determined by the conduct of a legislator, such as publicly expressing opposition to their party or support for another party, engaging in anti-party activities, criticizing the party on public forums on multiple occasions, and attending rallies organised by opposition parties. The Presiding Officer has no time limit to make his decision, for example if less than two third legislators of party defect then the Presiding Officer can use his discretion to either disqualify the legislators before a vote of no confidence is held or delay the decision on disqualification until after the "vote of no confidence" is held. In another example, if less than two third legislators of party defect together in more than one batch in such a way that the combined strength of the united defectors is more than two third before the decision on the defection is made, the Presiding Officer can use his discretion to either disqualify each batch of the defecting legislators or accept the combined batches of the defectors as the legal defection (no disqualification). This allows a possibility of the misuse by the Presiding Officer to benefit a specific party through further horse-trading (counter-defections), formation of unholy alliances or electoral fraud by exploiting the loopholes in the existing anti-defection laws. However, the decision of the Presiding Officer is subject to the judicial review by courts.

== Italy ==
In Italy, party-switching is more common than in other Western European parliamentary democracies, with nearly 25% of members of the Italian Chamber of Deputies switching parties at least once during the 1996 to 2001 legislative term. A 2004 article in The Journal of Politics posited that party-switching in Italy "most likely is motivated by party labels that provide little information about policy goals and that pit copartisans against each other in the effort to serve constituent needs."

== Kazakhstan ==
In Kazakhstan, deputies elected to the Mäjilis through nationwide party lists are legally bound to the party under which they were elected. According to the Constitutional Law No. 2529 "On the Parliament of the Republic of Kazakhstan and the Status of its Deputies", withdrawal or expulsion from that party automatically terminates the deputy's mandate, effectively prohibiting party switching for list-elected members. For example, Nūrjan Ältaev, elected via Nur Otan's party list, lost his parliamentary seat after forming a new political organisation, El Tıregı. The law does not explicitly regulate party changes for deputies elected in single-mandate districts, leaving such cases less clearly defined. For ordinary party members and officials, changing party affiliation is generally permitted, though internal party rules determine the implications for leadership positions, candidate eligibility, and party responsibilities.

Other notable cases include Zharmakhan Tuyakbay, who served as Mäjilis chairman and left Otan in 2004 to help establish the opposition Nationwide Social Democratic Party, as well as several smaller parties whose memberships merged into Nur Otan, illustrating the consolidation of Kazakhstan's political landscape.

== Malaysia ==
Party switching has been a serious issue in Malaysian politics, and it has been one of the main reasons for the fall of two federal governments and several state governments during the political crisis. On 28 July 2022, in Malaysia, the Constitution (Amendment) Bill (No. 3) 2022 regarding the provision prohibiting members of the Dewan Rakyat from jumping parties was approved by a two-thirds majority vote of the members of the Dewan Rakyat. Thus, Malaysia is also one of the countries that prohibit 'party hopping' or 'party cheating'. Similar laws have also been passed by 10 of 13 state legislatures except for Johor, Pahang and Terengganu as of July 2023.

== South Korea ==
Although quite rare in South Korean politics, the phrase "migratory bird" (철새; cheol-sae) is used to describe politicians who switch parties. The majority of party switches in Korea come from politicians creating their own minor parties after expulsions or resignations from their major party. Notable examples of this include:

- Jasmine Bacurnay Lee - Liberty Korea Party to Justice Party (South Korea) (conservative to progressive; 2019)
- Lee Jun-seok - People Power Party to Reform Party (South Korea) (created own minor party after resignation)
- Lee Nak-yon - Democratic Party (South Korea, 2015) to New Future Democratic Party (created own minor party after conflict)
- Yoo Jae-il - Unified Progressive Party to Liberty Unification Party (leftist to far right)
- Kim Chong-in - constant flip-flop between the two major parties.
- Lee In-je - judge and former politician who was the first to be described as a "migratory bird," member of 14 different parties during his career.

== New Zealand ==
Party switching in New Zealand gained currency in the 1990s leading up to, and in the first years after, the adoption of mixed-member proportional representation in the New Zealand Parliament. In particular, the phrase "waka-jumping" entered the public consciousness in 1998 when then-Prime Minister Jenny Shipley expelled the New Zealand First party from the ruling coalition government, and several New Zealand First MPs resigned from the party and stayed loyal to the government. In response to these defections, the Electoral (Integrity) Amendment Act was passed in 2001, which later expired in 2005. A proposal to replace the Act failed in 2005 but was successful in 2018. A private members' bill to repeal the Electoral (Integrity) Amendment Act 2018 was considered in 2020 but was defeated in June 2021.

== Nicaragua ==
In Nicaragua, some major party switches occurred between 2002 and 2006 when the two major political parties, the Constitutional Liberal Party and the Sandinista National Liberation Front, formed a pact and members of both parties left to form new parties or make alliances with smaller ones.

== Philippines ==
Party-switching known in the Philippines as Political butterfly or commonly known as Balimbing (Note: Balimbing refers to politicians in the Philippines who frequently switch parties or allegiances for personal gain, often likened to the starfruit due to its many faces, symbolizing their fickleness and opportunism.), "has become the norm, the practice" in the Philippines, according to Julio Teehankee, a political science professor at De La Salle University. During midterm elections, politicians usually attach themselves to the party of the ruling president. This has led to transactional dealings, and parties are identified more on personalities instead of platforms. Aside from party-switching, internal squabbles within parties lead to the formation of new ones. Vice President Jejomar Binay, elected under PDP–Laban, formed his own United Nationalist Alliance (UNA) as his party for his 2016 presidential campaign. Ex-Lakas members who do not want to join the then-ruling Liberal Party in 2013 joined to form the National Unity Party.

These are presidents who have been members of another party but switched to a different party or founded a new one to run for president:

- Manuel Roxas, elected as assemblyman in 1922 as a Nacionalista; won the election as senator in 1941, lost out to incumbent president Sergio Osmeña in that party's nominating convention in 1946; founded the Liberal Party and won the election. Died in office in 1948.
- Elpidio Quirino, elected as congressman in 1919 as a Nacionalista, won election as senator in 1925, joined Roxas (above) in co-founding the Liberal Party in 1946 and won the vice-presidential election, succeeded Roxas upon the latter's death in 1948, won the presidential election in 1949, defeated in 1953.
- Ramon Magsaysay, elected as congressman in 1946 as a Liberal; lost out to incumbent president Elpidio Quirino in that party's nominating convention in 1953; switched to the Nacionalistas, and won the election. Died in office in 1957.
- Ferdinand Marcos, elected as a congressman in 1949 as a Liberal, won election as senator in 1959; lost out to incumbent president Diosdado Macapagal in that party's nominating convention in 1965; switched to the Nacionalistas, and won the election. Won reelection in 1969; declared martial law, subsequently ruled by decree, and banned opposition parties, forming the Kilusang Bagong Lipunan. Reelected in 1981, ousted in 1986 after being proclaimed as the winner in the 1986 snap election.
- Fidel V. Ramos lost out to speaker Ramon Mitra Jr. in the nominating convention of the Laban ng Demokratikong Pilipino (LDP) in 1991; co-founded the Lakas ng Tao and won the election. Lakas ng Tao would ultimately merge with several parties to become Lakas–NUCD–UMDP.
- Joseph Estrada, elected as mayor of San Juan in 1969 as a Nacionalista, won election as senator in 1987, switched to the Liberal Party mid-term, founded the Partido ng Masang Pilipino to run for president, switched to the Nationalist People's Coalition to run for vice president in the 1992 election, and won the election. Founded the Laban ng Makabayang Masang Pilipino as his presidential vehicle in 1998 and won; ousted in 2001, re-founded the Pwersa ng Masang Pilipino (PMP), ran for president in 2010 and lost, ran for mayor of Manila in 2013 under United Nationalist Alliance and won; reelected in 2016 and lost reelection in 2019 under the PMP.
- Gloria Macapagal Arroyo, elected as senator in 1992 under the LDP; founded the Kabalikat ng Malayang Pilipino (KAMPI) in 1997 to run for president, switched to Lakas to run for vice president and won. Succeeded to the presidency in 2001, ran for president in 2004 and won; Lakas–NUCD–UMDP renamed as "Lakas–CMD" in 2004. Lakas and KAMPI merged in 2009 to form Lakas Kampi CMD. Ran for congresswoman in 2010 and won; Lakas Kampi CMD renamed back to Lakas–CMD in 2011; won reelection in 2013 and 2016. Switched to PDP–Laban in 2017, became speaker in 2018; returned to Lakas in 2020.

Several more examples can be seen in lower positions.

== Russia ==
In the Russian Federation, party switching is considered illegal in the State Duma and is highly frowned upon. After major party switches during the Boris Yeltsin Presidency, party switching was declared illegal in the State Duma, and can result in a forced resignation of the State Duma representative by the chairman of their ex-political party. However, members of the State Duma considered an independent politician may be permitted to join and switch to a party at any time. They may not switch after that. After a forced resignation, the State Duma representative can run again in future elections, as their new party's whip. The chairman of the political party can choose to replace the party switcher with whomever they choose. Party merging, however, is not illegal and can be seen when a big number of political parties merged into United Russia, the ruling party of Russia.

== Turkey ==
Party switching is not unusual in Turkey, but Kubilay Uygun is known for his repeated switching during his single term in the Grand National Assembly of Turkey (1995 – 1999). He resigned from his party seven times and served four different parties, finishing as an independent.

== Ukraine ==
In Ukraine, the imperative mandate provision of the Ukrainian Constitution banned party switching in Parliament from 2004 to 2010. The mandate stipulated that the constitution and laws of Ukraine obliged members of the Verkhovna Rada, Ukraine's Parliament, to remain members of the parliamentary faction or bloc in which they were elected.

This was evident during the 2007 Ukrainian political crisis where members of the opposition crossed party lines with plans to undermine Presidential authority and move towards the 300 constitutional majority.

On 21 February 2014, the Ukrainian parliament passed a law that reinstated the 2004 imperative mandate. In practice, the imperative mandate causes the deprivation of the mandate of deputies who leave their faction by their own initiative while deputies who are removed from their faction become independent MPs.

== United States ==
Party-switching in the United States Congress (for example, from the Republican Party to the Democratic Party, or vice versa) is relatively rare. During the period between 1947 and 1997, only 20 members of the House of Representatives and Senate switched parties. Periods with a high degree of party switching (among both elected officials and citizens) are linked to periods of partisan realignment.

After the 1994 elections (in which Republicans gained control of both chambers of Congress for the first time in four decades), five House Democrats and two Senate Democrats switched to the Republican Party. Another notable switch took place in 2001 when Senator Jim Jeffords of Vermont left the Republican Party to become a political independent, which placed the Senate in Democratic control. Another notable instance occurred in April 2009, when Senator Arlen Specter of Pennsylvania, a Republican, switched to the Democratic Party. After Al Franken was seated in July 2009, this meant Democrats had a supermajority in the Senate, allowing them to end a filibuster. This was critical in the passage of the Affordable Care Act, also known as Obamacare.

== Vanuatu ==
In 2024, Vanuatu voted in a Constitutional referendum that would stop party switching. 59.28% voted in favor forcing MPs to vacate their seats if leaving or being excluded by the party under which they were elected.

== See also ==
- Crossing the floor, which in some Westminster systems may express a specialised meaning similar to party-switching
- Floor crossing (South Africa)
- List of Canadian politicians who have crossed the floor
- List of elected British politicians who have changed party affiliation
- List of United States representatives who switched parties
- List of United States senators who switched parties
- Waka-jumping - party-hopping in New-Zealand
- Party discipline
- List of Irish politicians who changed party affiliation
- Defection
