= Gaya Lal =

Indian politician

Member of the Haryana Legislative Assembly
- In office 1977–1982
- Constituency: Hassanpur
- In office 1967–1968
- Constituency: Hassanpur

Personal details
- Born: Palwal, British India
- Party: Independent (till 1967, 1982)
- Other political affiliations: Bharatiya Lok Dal (1972); Indian National Congress (1967); United Front (1967, 1967-1968); Arya Sabha (1972); Janata Party (1977)
- Relations: Udai Bhan (son)

Gaya Lal was an Indian politician and member of the Indian National Congress. Lal was a member of the Haryana Legislative Assembly from the Hassanpur constituency (now Hodal) in the Palwal district.

== Aaya Ram Gaya Ram incident ==
Gaya Lal in 1967 changed party thrice in a day first from the Indian National Congress to the United Front, then back to the Indian National Congress, and then within nine hours to the United Front again. When Gaya Lal decided to quit the Congress and join the United Front, then INC leader Rao Birender Singh brought him to Chandigarh press and declared "Aaya Ram Gaya Ram". It became the subject of numerous jokes and cartoons. In 1985 the Constitution was amended to prevent such defections.

Lal's son, Udai Bhan, became State President of the Haryana unit of the Indian National Congress.
