= Mohd Israil =

Indian politician

Chaudhary Mohammed Israil

Member of the Haryana Legislative Assembly
- Incumbent
- Assumed office 8 October 2024
- Preceded by: Praveen Dagar
- Constituency: Hathin

Personal details
- Born: Hathin, Haryana, India
- Party: Indian National Congress
- Parent(s): Jaleb Khan (father), Shrimati Rehmati (mother)

Chaudhary Mohammed Israil is an Indian politician who is a current member of the Haryana Legislative Assembly from the Hathin constituency of the Palwal district of Haryana. He was elected as a Member of the Haryana Legislative Assembly from the Hathin constituency in the 2024 Haryana Legislative Assembly election.

== Early life ==
Israil was born to Jaleb Khan and Shrimati Rehmati in the village of Kot/Uttawar Hathin, Haryana. Israil has a younger brother, Mohd Sajid Khan, who is serving as Deputy Superintendent of Jail in the Haryana Police. He is an ethnic Meo belonging to the Chhirkalot pal. His father was a famous Chaudhary in the Mewat region of Haryana.

== Political career ==
Mohd Israil contested his first election in the Hathin constituency after the death of his father in 2019 under the Indian National Congress, where he lost to Parveen dagar by a margin of 2887 votes. In 2024, he re-contested where he won his first election from the same seat. Chaudhary Mohd Israil an alumnus of Jamia Millia Islamia, University New Delhi, won the Hathin assembly seat in Haryana by a margin of 32396 votes. Mohd Israil defeated Manoj Kumar Rawat of the Bhartiya Janta party. He got a total of 79907 votes. This is the biggest margin on this seat since 1967 and after 34 years the Congress candidate has won this assembly seat.

=== Suspension from the Indian National Congress ===
In April 2026, Mohd Israil, along with four other Congress MLAs, was suspended from the Indian National Congress for anti-party activities following cross-voting for the BJP candidate, Satish Nandal, in the 2026 Rajya Sabha elections.

== See also ==
- Jaleb Khan
- 2024 Haryana Legislative Assembly election
- Haryana Legislative Assembly
