= Jaleb Khan =

Indian politician

Baba Chaudhary Jaleb Khan
- Jaleb Khan, 2017

Chief Parliamentary Secretary, Government of Haryana
- In office 27 July 2009 – 26 July 2014
- Ministries and Departments: Revenue and Disaster Management; Employment; Waqf; Mines and Geology
- Chief Minister: Bhupinder Singh Hooda
- Governor: Jagannath Pahadia

Member of the Haryana Legislative Assembly
- In office 2009–2014
- Constituency: Hathin

Personal details
- Born: 15 July 1942 Hathin, British India (present-day Haryana, India)
- Died: 18 September 2017 (aged 75)
- Party: Independent
- Spouse: Shrimati Rehmati
- Children: Mohammad Israil

Chaudhary Jaleb Khan also known as Baba Jaleb Khan (born 15 July 1942) was an Indian politician who served as a Chief Parliamentary Secretary in the Government of Haryana. He was elected as a Member of the Haryana Legislative Assembly from the Hathin constituency once in 2009 and served his complete term till 2014.

== Early life ==
Chaudhary Jaleb Khan was born on July 15, 1942, in the village of Kot/Uttawar in Hathin, Haryana, India, to Chaudhary Suleiman, a prominent Chaudhary in the Mewat region of India. He was an ethnic Meo belonging to the Chhirkalot pal (clan).

Jaleb Khan was not very literate and only received a primary education up to the fifth grade. He was married to Shrimati Rehmati, and had two sons, Mohd Israil and Mohd Sajid Khan.

== Personal life ==
The people of Mewat gave Jaleb Khan the honorific title of Baba (meaning father or respected elder) due to his simplistic lifestyle. He was also known for promoting Hindu-Muslim unity in his region of Hathin, which has the significantly higher Hindu population compared to other areas of the Mewat region of Haryana.

== Political career ==
Chaudhary Jaleb Khan contested the Haryana Legislative Assembly elections in 1996 independent where he earned 10069 votes and came in third position. Then he contested again in 2005 under the Indian National Congress where he lost by a margin of 8,830 ballots against the independent candidate, Harsh Kumar. It was in 2009 where he finally defeated Harsh Kumar despite himself being independent and Harsh Kumar receiving the Indian National Congress ticket by a margin of 6473 votes garnering a total of 29.59% of the total ballots in the Hathin constituency that year.

Jaleb Khan had a successful political career being elected as a Chief Parliamentary Secretary in the Government of Haryana under Bhupinder Singh Hooda's second ministry in Haryana.

He is also known to be the individual who asked for Hathin to become a constituent of Palwal district rather than the Nuh district (previously Mewat district) of Haryana.

== See also ==
- Mewat
- Hathin Assembly Constituency
- Haryana Legislative Assembly
