= Girraj =

Girraj is a given name. Notable people with the name include:

- Girraj Dandotiya (fl. 2018), Indian politician
- Girraj Kishore Mahaur (born 1950), Indian politician
- Girraj Singh Dharmesh (fl. 2017), Indian politician
