= Palwal Assembly constituency =

Legislative Assembly constituency in Haryana State, India

Coordinates: 28.15°N 77.32°E

Palwal
- Constituency No. 84 for the Haryana Legislative Assembly

Constituency details
- Country: India
- Region: North India
- State: Haryana
- District: Palwal
- Lok Sabha constituency: Faridabad
- Total electors: 2,67,868
- Reservation: None

Member of Legislative Assembly
- 15th Haryana Legislative Assembly
- Incumbent Gaurav Gautam
- Party: Bharatiya Janata Party
- Elected year: 2024

Palwal is one of the 90 Legislative Assembly constituencies of Haryana state in India.

It is part of Palwal district. As of 2019, it is represented by Deepak Mangla of the Bharatiya Janata Party.

== Members of the Legislative Assembly ==
Year	Member	Party
1967	Dhan Singh	Independent
1968	Roop Lal Mehta	Indian National Congress
1972	Sham Lal Tewatia	Akhil Bhartiya Arya Sabha
1977	Mool Chand	Janata Party
1982	Kalyan Singh	Indian National Congress
1987	Subhash Chand	Lokdal
1991	Karan Singh Dalal	Haryana Vikas Party
1996	Karan Singh Dalal	Haryana Vikas Party
2000	Karan Singh Dalal	Republican Party of India
2005	Karan Singh Dalal	Indian National Congress
2009	Subhash Choudhary	Indian National Lok Dal
2014	Karan Singh Dalal	Indian National Congress
2019	Deepak Mangla	Bharatiya Janata Party
2024	Gaurav Gautam	Bharatiya Janata Party

== Election results ==
=== Assembly Election 2024 ===
2024 Haryana Legislative Assembly election: Palwal
Party	Candidate	Votes	%	±%
BJP	Gaurav Gautam	109,118	56.57%	▲0.97
INC	Karan Singh Dalal	75,513	39.15%	▲1.14
ASP(KR)	Harit Kumar	2,578	1.34%	New
BSP	Abhishek Deshwal	2,540	1.32%	New
Independent	Shiv Dutt	1,116	0.58%	New
NOTA	None of the Above	506	0.26%	▼0.30
Margin of victory		33,605	17.42%	▼0.17
Turnout		1,92,880	71.97%	▲2.07
Registered electors		2,67,868		▲16.48
BJP hold		Swing	▲0.97	

=== Assembly Election 2019 ===
2019 Haryana Legislative Assembly election: Palwal
Party	Candidate	Votes	%	±%
BJP	Deepak Mangla	89,426	55.60%	▲21.78
INC	Karan Singh Dalal	61,130	38.01%	▲0.50
JJP	Gaya Lal	6,498	4.04%	New
NOTA	Nota	910	0.57%	▼0.04
Margin of victory		28,296	17.59%	▲13.91
Turnout		1,60,830	69.91%	▼7.80
Registered electors		2,30,061		▲16.77
BJP gain from INC		Swing	▲18.09	

=== Assembly Election 2014 ===
2014 Haryana Legislative Assembly election: Palwal
Party	Candidate	Votes	%	±%
INC	Karan Singh Dalal	57,423	37.51%	▼2.92
BJP	Deepak Mangla	51,781	33.82%	▲30.79
INLD	Subhash Chaudhary	32,676	21.34%	▼25.08
BSP	Subhash Chand Katyal	7,375	4.82%	▼2.51
NOTA	None of the Above	927	0.61%	New
Margin of victory		5,642	3.69%	▼2.30
Turnout		1,53,093	77.70%	▲5.50
Registered electors		1,97,019		▲27.70
INC gain from INLD		Swing	▼8.91	

=== Assembly Election 2009 ===
2009 Haryana Legislative Assembly election: Palwal
Party	Candidate	Votes	%	±%
INLD	Subhash Choudhary	51,712	46.42%	▲17.07
INC	Karan Singh Dalal	45,040	40.43%	▼16.87
BSP	Dharam Chand	8,161	7.33%	▼1.44
BJP	Anangpal Bainsla	3,376	3.03%	▲0.16
HJC(BL)	Dal Chand	759	0.68%	New
Independent	Phool Chand Aggarwal	692	0.62%	New
Margin of victory		6,672	5.99%	▼21.95
Turnout		1,11,396	72.20%	▲3.99
Registered electors		1,54,279		▲3.83
INLD gain from INC		Swing	▼10.88	

=== Assembly Election 2005 ===
2005 Haryana Legislative Assembly election: Palwal
Party	Candidate	Votes	%	±%
INC	Karan Singh Dalal	58,074	57.30%	▲51.10
INLD	Subhash Chand	29,751	29.35%	▲1.08
BSP	Tuhi Ram	8,888	8.77%	▼10.78
BJP	Sanjay S/O Net Ram	2,911	2.87%	New
Independent	Dr. K. P. Singh	932	0.92%	New
Margin of victory		28,323	27.94%	▲12.87
Turnout		1,01,355	68.21%	▼4.90
Registered electors		1,48,591		▲25.45
INC gain from RPI		Swing	▲13.95	

=== Assembly Election 2000 ===
2000 Haryana Legislative Assembly election: Palwal
Party	Candidate	Votes	%	±%
RPI	Karan Singh Dalal	37,539	43.35%	New
INLD	Devender Chauhan	24,487	28.27%	New
BSP	Subhash Chaudhary	16,933	19.55%	▲2.14
INC	Yogesh Gaur	5,369	6.20%	▼6.15
HVP	Jitender Singh Rawat	1,601	1.85%	▼48.79
Margin of victory		13,052	15.07%	▼18.15
Turnout		86,604	74.18%	▲5.78
Registered electors		1,18,450		▲0.41
RPI gain from HVP		Swing	▼7.29	

=== Assembly Election 1996 ===
1996 Haryana Legislative Assembly election: Palwal
Party	Candidate	Votes	%	±%
HVP	Karan Singh Dalal	40,219	50.64%	▲11.90
BSP	Subhash Chaudhary	13,832	17.42%	New
INC	Kishan Chand	9,808	12.35%	▼12.67
SAP	Devender Chauhan	7,203	9.07%	New
Independent	Subhash Chander	5,351	6.74%	New
JD	Balkishan Saini	660	0.83%	New
Independent	Master Girraj Singh	556	0.70%	New
Margin of victory		26,387	33.22%	▲19.50
Turnout		79,425	69.85%	▲3.28
Registered electors		1,17,962		▲4.98
HVP hold		Swing	▲11.90	

=== Assembly Election 1991 ===
1991 Haryana Legislative Assembly election: Palwal
Party	Candidate	Votes	%	±%
HVP	Karan Singh Dalal	27,882	38.74%	New
INC	Nitya Nand Sharma	18,008	25.02%	▲1.86
JP	Subhash Chand	16,811	23.36%	▲22.81
BJP	Chnder Bhan	7,805	10.84%	New
Independent	Virender Singh	374	0.52%	New
Margin of victory		9,874	13.72%	▼7.03
Turnout		71,975	66.40%	▼5.30
Registered electors		1,12,366		▲11.82
HVP gain from LKD		Swing	▼5.17	

=== Assembly Election 1987 ===
1987 Haryana Legislative Assembly election: Palwal
Party	Candidate	Votes	%	±%
LKD	Subhash Chand	30,602	43.91%	▲31.43
INC	Kishan Chand	16,139	23.16%	▼18.82
Independent	Shriram Verma	8,748	12.55%	New
Independent	Parmanand	7,727	11.09%	New
VHP	Raghubir Singh	4,045	5.80%	New
Independent	Kishan Singh Rawat	441	0.63%	New
JP	Shiv Narain	384	0.55%	New
Margin of victory		14,463	20.75%	▲6.03
Turnout		69,691	70.90%	▲0.15
Registered electors		1,00,489		▲24.43
LKD gain from INC		Swing	▲1.93	

=== Assembly Election 1982 ===
1982 Haryana Legislative Assembly election: Palwal
Party	Candidate	Votes	%	±%
INC	Kalyan Singh	23,463	41.98%	▲12.31
Independent	Subhash Chand	15,232	27.25%	New
Independent	Narain Datt	7,941	14.21%	New
LKD	Rajender	6,973	12.48%	New
Independent	Phool Chand Aggarwal	646	1.16%	New
Independent	Tuhi Ram	472	0.84%	New
Independent	Ranvir Kumar	352	0.63%	New
Independent	Ranvir Singh	328	0.59%	New
Independent	Chander Prabha	307	0.55%	New
Margin of victory		8,231	14.73%	▼6.33
Turnout		55,888	70.64%	▲0.93
Registered electors		80,762		▲15.95
INC gain from JP		Swing	▼8.75	

=== Assembly Election 1977 ===
1977 Haryana Legislative Assembly election: Palwal
Party	Candidate	Votes	%	±%
JP	Mool Chand	24,127	50.74%	New
INC	Kalyan Singh	14,112	29.68%	▼11.22
Independent	Laxmi Narain	5,476	11.52%	New
Independent	Harkrishan	2,260	4.75%	New
Independent	Krishan Pal Singh	825	1.73%	New
Independent	Om Prakash	753	1.58%	New
Margin of victory		10,015	21.06%	▲12.16
Turnout		47,553	69.03%	▼1.03
Registered electors		69,652		▼0.89
JP gain from Akhil Bhartiya Arya Sabha		Swing	▲0.94	

=== Assembly Election 1972 ===
1972 Haryana Legislative Assembly election: Palwal
Party	Candidate	Votes	%	±%
Akhil Bhartiya Arya Sabha	Sham Lal	24,253	49.79%	New
INC	Kalyan Singh	19,919	40.89%	▼12.98
Independent	Nanak Chand	2,983	6.12%	New
Independent	Rajender Prashad	1,553	3.19%	New
Margin of victory		4,334	8.90%	▼11.07
Turnout		48,708	71.11%	▲12.35
Registered electors		70,279		▲12.13
Akhil Bhartiya Arya Sabha gain from INC		Swing	▼4.08	

=== Assembly Election 1968 ===
1968 Haryana Legislative Assembly election: Palwal
Party	Candidate	Votes	%	±%
INC	Roop Lal Mehta	19,231	53.87%	▲28.34
SWA	Dhan Singh	12,102	33.90%	New
RPI	Om Parkash	3,259	9.13%	New
Independent	Chandgi Ram	1,107	3.10%	New
Margin of victory		7,129	19.97%	▲19.12
Turnout		35,699	58.49%	▼13.31
Registered electors		62,675		▲3.70
INC gain from Independent		Swing	▲27.09	

=== Assembly Election 1967 ===
1967 Haryana Legislative Assembly election: Palwal
Party	Candidate	Votes	%	±%
Independent	Dhan Singh	11,374	26.78%	New
ABJS	M. Chand	11,012	25.93%	New
INC	R. Mehta	10,843	25.53%	New
Independent	D. Parkash	5,825	13.72%	New
Independent	B. Ram	3,411	8.03%	New
Margin of victory		362	0.85%	
Turnout		42,465	74.01%	
Registered electors		60,436		
Independent win (new seat)				

== See also ==
- List of constituencies of the Haryana Legislative Assembly
- Palwal district
