= Mandkola =

- Village
- Location within Haryana Location within India
- Coordinates: 28°08′15″N 77°10′45″E
- Country: India
- State: Haryana
- District: Palwal
- Lok Sabha: Hathin (Assembly constituency)
- Vidhan Sabha: Palwal

Government
  - Type: Local government in India
  - Body: Gram Panchayat
  - Pradhan (Sarpanch): Savita

Population (2011)
  - Total: 10,773

Languages
  - Official: Hindi
  - Local: Haryanvi, Hindi
- Time zone: UTC+5:30 (IST)
- PIN: 121103
- Nearest city: Palwal, Hodal, Hatin, Mathura, Faridabad

Mandkola is a village and Gram panchayat located in Hathin Tehsil of Palwal district, Haryana, India. The Village is situated 14 km away from sub-district headquarter Hathin and 15 km away from district headquarter Palwal.
