= Phulwari, Haryana =

Phulwari
- village
- Location in Haryana, India Phulwari (India)
- Coordinates: 28.072720°N 77.325757°E
- Country: India
- State: Haryana
- District: Palwal

Languages
  - Official: Hindi, English
- Time zone: UTC+5:30 (IST)

Phulwari is a large Indian village in Palwal district of Haryana state.
