= Hasanpur Assembly constituency =

Hasanpur Assembly constituency may refer to:

- Hasanpur, Bihar Assembly constituency
- Hasanpur, Uttar Pradesh Assembly constituency

== See also ==
- Hassanpur Assembly constituency, Haryana
