= Off the Kuff =

American political blog

Off the Kuff is an American political blog based in Houston, Texas, mainly covering state and local politics. Founded in 2001 by Charles Kuffner, it is the oldest continuously run political blog in Texas, and has gained support throughout the state for its detailed political reporting and commentating.

Posts are predominantly written from a liberal point of view, but are often admired from both sides of the aisle.

Selected works from Off the Kuff have been syndicated in the Houston Chronicle, and the blog has been featured in both the Houston Press and Texas Monthly.
