= Kuslipur =

Village in the Palaal district, India

Kuslipur is a village in Palwal district, of Haryana State, India. It belongs to Faridabad Division. The village is connected by NH-2 Delhi—Agra.
