= Mankameshwar Temple =

Hindu temple in Agra, India

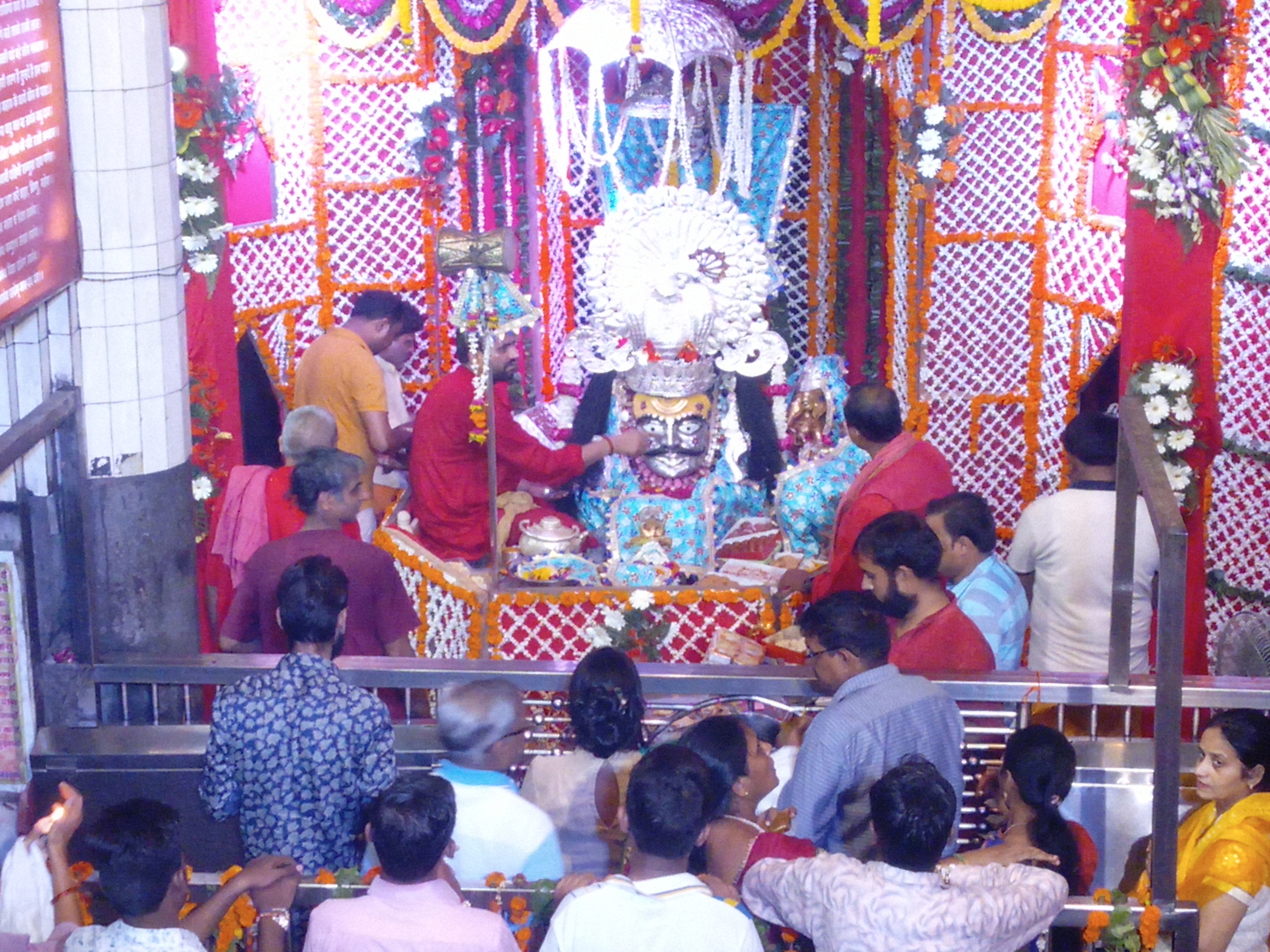
- Shri Mankameshwar Temple Agra

Religion
- Affiliation: Hinduism
- District: Agra
- Deity: Lord Shiva

Location
- Location: Rawatpara
- State: Uttar Pradesh
- Country: India
- Interactive map of Mankameshwar Temple

Mankameshwar Temple in a Hindu temple in Agra is one of the ancient temples devoted to Lord Shiva. The temple is situated at Rawatpara, near Agra Fort Railway Station. This temple is believed to be one of the oldest temples in the city. It is said that the Shiva Linga in the temple is covered by silver and was founded by Shiva himself in the Dvapara Yuga, when Krishna was born in Mathura.

== Overview ==
The temple has one sanctum sanctorum with a Vigraha of Lord Shiva . It is surrounded by the typical Shiva family idols. One has to descend down a score of stairs to reach the sanctum sanctorum. One can reach fully close to the Vigraha provided one does not wear leather items and English style pants, pyjamas, and salwaar suits.

Behind the sanctum sanctorum are several small temples within the main temple complex. These are devoted to various deities like Goddess Ganga, Saraswati, Gayatri, Hanuman, Kaila devi, Narasimha, Krishna, Rama to name a few.

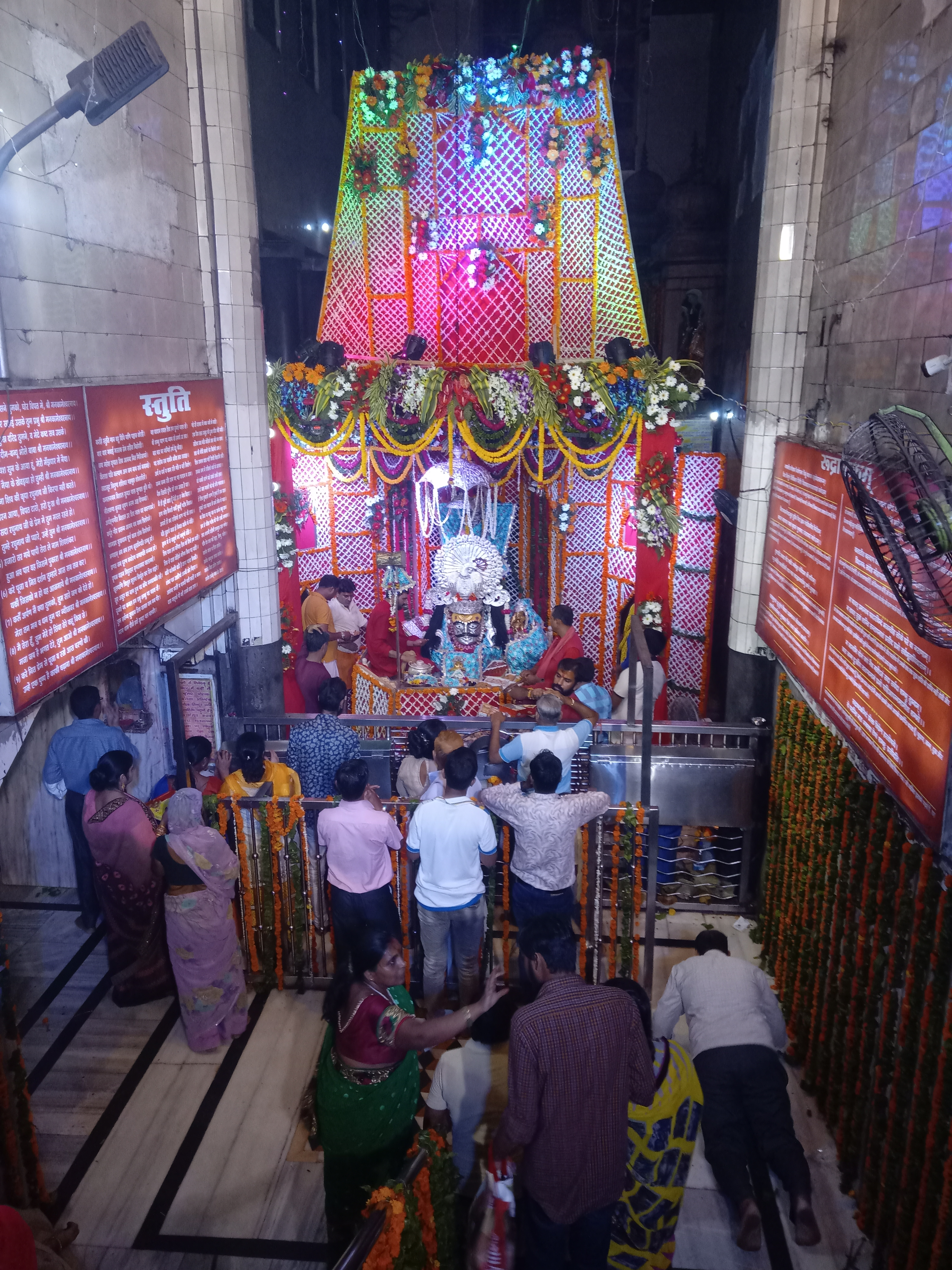
View of Shri Mankameshwar Temple Agra from outside

== See also ==
- Mankameshwar metro station
- Agra Fort
