= Bahin =

Village in Haryana, India

Bahin is a village in Hathin municipality in Palwal district, Haryana State, India.

== History ==
=== Kanha Rawat ===
Kanha Rawat, a Hindu Jat born in Bahin village, fought against the oppression of Aurangzeb's Islamic rule and his policy of persecuting Hindus, forcible conversion of Hindus to Islam, and high tax rate. While young he was married to Karpuri Devi and remarried Tarawati after the demise of first wife. On 9 April 1669, Aurangzeb issued a firman (Islamic diktat) to destroy Hindu temples and schools, following which a large number of Hindu schools and temples were destroyed in Mathura region. In 1678, Aurangzeb's faujdar (commander) of Mathura region began persecuting Hindus and started to destroy temples, consequently Jats and farmers under the leadership of Gokul rose against the oppressive Mughal Empire rule and stopped paying taxes, and Hindus refused offer of conversion to Islam made at Bahin village by Aurangzeb's emissary "Sher Khan". Kanha too was captured, refused to convert to Islam and killed at Rawatpara by burying alive in a pit in 1684. (Note: In accordance with the "al atuba ayat no five" (Surah at-Taubah (Repentance) 9:5), which states "And when the sacred months have passed, then kill the polytheists wherever you find them and capture them and besiege them and sit in wait for them at every place of ambush. But if they should repent, establish prayer, and give zakāh, let them [go] on their way. Indeed, Allāh is Forgiving and Merciful.")

Kanha's samadhi is at his native Bahin village, where Kanha Rawat Memorial Park was also constructed in his memory. A statue of Kanha was unveiled inside the park in February 2014 by Vishvendra Singh - the scion of Bharatpur State.

=== Post-independence ===
The village was granted sub-tehsil status in February 2014.

== See also ==
- Administrative divisions of Haryana
- List of cities in Haryana by population
- List of constituencies of the Haryana Legislative Assembly
- List of districts of Haryana
- List of highways in Haryana
- Outline of Haryana
- Railway in Haryana
