= Bela Palwal =

Bela is gram panchyat of three villages namely Azizabad, Aligarh (Gundbass) and Bela in Palwal district of Haryana, India. It is in Palwal.
