= Hodal =

Town in Haryana, India

- Town
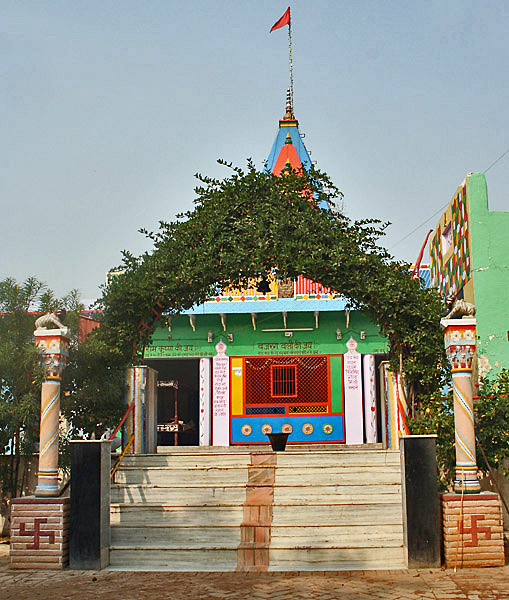
- Lord Hanuman Temple at Chameli Van dham

- Location in Haryana, India Hodal (India)
- Coordinates: 27.894°N 77.369°E
- Country: India
- State: Haryana
- District: Palwal
- Elevation: 190 m (620 ft)

Population (2011)
  - Total: 51,050

Languages
  - Official: Hindi, Regional Braj Bhasha, Haryanvi
- Time zone: UTC+5:30 (IST)
- PIN: 121106
- ISO 3166 code: IN-HR
- Vehicle registration: HR50
- Website: haryana.gov.in

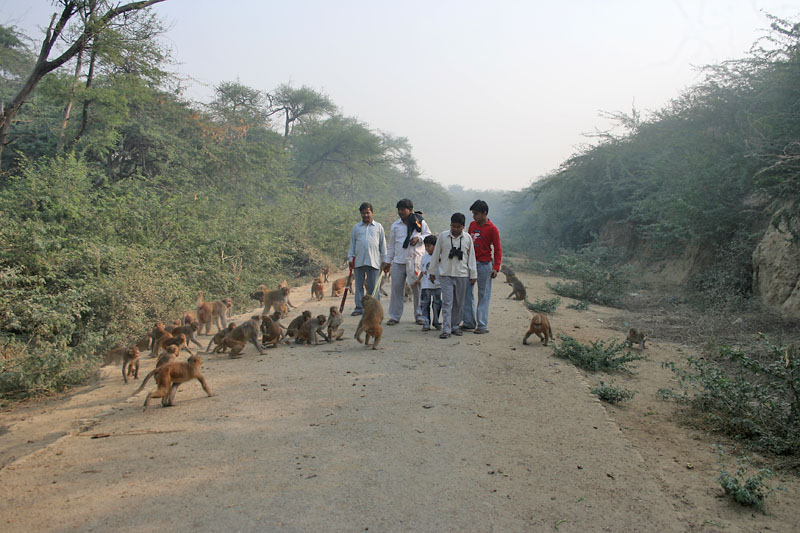
Monkeys at Chameli Van in Hodal in Palwal district of Haryana, India.

Hodal is a town and a municipal council, located, on Palwal Road in Palwal district in the Haryana state of India.It is Part of Braj region. Its language is Braj bhasha & Haryanvi. It is located at 27°53′39″N 77°22′09″E and has an average elevation of 190 meters (620 feet). Hodal is a Haryana Legislative Assembly constituency segment, within the Faridabad Lok Sabha constituency.

== Demographics ==
As of the 2001 India census, Hodal had a population of 55,306. Males constituted 53% of the population and females 47%. Hodal has an average literacy rate of 57%, lower than the national average of 59.5%: male literacy is 67%, and female literacy is 46%. In Hodal, 18% of the population is under 6 years of age.

Religion in Hodal City
Religion	Population (1911)	Percentage (1911)
Hinduism	4,075	74.52%
Islam	1,384	25.31%
Sikhism	2	0.04%
Christianity	7	0.13%
Total Population	5,468	100%

== See also ==
- Girraj Kishore Mahaur, former MLA of Hodal
- Hasanpur
- Bahin
- Hathin
