= Crossing the floor =

Changing one's political allegiance while in office

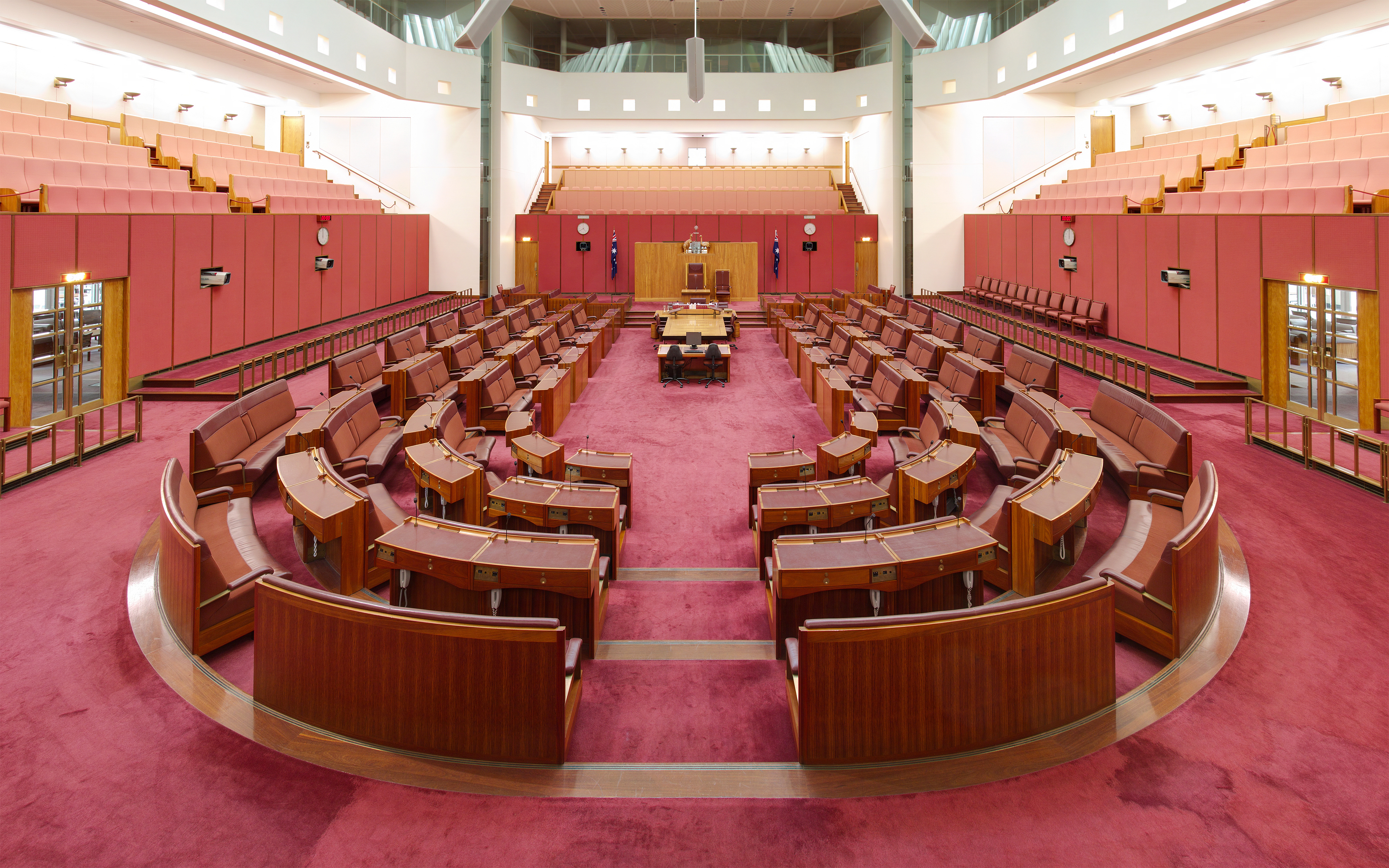
In the Australian Senate, Senators vote in favor of a motion by sitting on the benches to the president's right (left of photo), and against it by sitting on the benches to the president's left (right of photo)

In some parliamentary systems (e.g., in Canada and the United Kingdom), politicians are said to cross the floor if they formally change their political affiliation to a political party different from the one they were initially elected under. In Australia, this term simply refers to Members of Parliament (MPs) who dissent from the party line and vote against the express instructions of the party whip while retaining membership in their political party. (Note: The Australian Labor Party has sanctions which can include expulsion of a member from the party if they cross the floor.)

Voting against party lines may lead to consequences such as losing a position (e.g., as minister or a portfolio critic) or being ejected from the party caucus. While these practices are legally permissible in most countries, crossing the floor can lead to controversy and media attention. Some countries like Malaysia, Pakistan, India, Indonesia, the Maldives and Bangladesh have laws that remove a member from parliament due to floor-crossing.

== Etymology ==
The term originates from the British House of Commons, which is configured with the Government and Opposition facing each other on rows of benches. In consequence, MPs who switch from the governing party to one in opposition (or vice versa) also change the side of the chamber on which they sit. A notable example of this is Winston Churchill, who crossed the floor from the Conservatives to the Liberals in 1904, later crossing back in 1924. The term has passed into general use in other Westminster parliamentary democracies even if many of these countries have semicircular or horseshoe-shaped debating chambers.

The Australian meaning on the other hand arises from the way divisions—roll call votes—are conducted. In Australian chambers, members move to the government benches (on the presiding officer's right) to vote in favor of a motion, and to the opposition benches (on the presiding officer's left) to vote against a motion. Therefore, an MP who crosses the floor is on the opposite side of the chamber from the rest of their party, and on government motions frequently on the opposite side of the chamber than they normally sit.

In Nigeria, the term "crossing the carpet" or "carpet crossing" is used. In India, a similar expression is "Aaya Ram Gaya Ram", referring to political floor-crossing.

== Changing parties ==
In the United Kingdom and Canada, crossing the floor means leaving one's party entirely and joining another caucus. For example, leaving an opposition party to support the government (or vice versa), leaving or being expelled from the party one ran with at election and sitting as a clear (Note: Independents are MPs who are not members of any party recognized in the House, which may happen for a range of reasons. The House may have a minimum threshold caucus size for recognition in the House (as in official party status in Canada; this is distinct from party status with the electoral oversight body), so if only one or two politicians are elected from a minor party their party is not accorded status and they are treated as independents. Another reason could relate to e.g. the death of a party's candidate after ballots were printed but before polling began, so alternate candidate runs independently but pledging to "take the whip" of party X. These examples are not "clearly" independent MPs, unlike someone who resigns from party Y declaring they can no longer in principle remain with it, or someone who ran and was elected on a platform against all the existing parties.) independent, or even leaving one opposition party to join another. In both countries, the term carries only this meaning, not simply voting against the party line on a bill.

In April 2006, then-premier of Manitoba Gary Doer of the New Democratic Party of Manitoba proposed banning crossing the floor in the Manitoba legislature in response to "the concern some voters have expressed over the high-profile defections of three federal MPs from their parties in just over two years". The resulting legislation, which amended the provincial Legislative Assembly Act, mandated that members of the legislature who quit (or are expelled from) their political party had to serve out the remainder of their term as independents. However, in 2018, the Progressive Conservative government of Brian Pallister repealed the bill.

An extraordinary example occurred in Alberta, Canada, in December 2014 when Danielle Smith, the Leader of the Official Opposition. She and eight of her MLAs, all of the Wildrose Party, crossed the floor together to join the governing Progressive Conservative Association of Alberta. In 2019, eleven British MPs defected from the Conservative and Labour parties to form the Change UK party. In September 2019, the governing Conservative party lost its working majority when Phillip Lee MP defected to the Liberal Democrats during the first speech of new prime minister Boris Johnson. On 19 January 2022, Christian Wakeford, Conservative MP for Bury South, crossed the floor to the Labour benches.

== Voting against party lines ==
In some countries, the phrase "crossing the floor" describes members of a government party or parties who defect by voting with the opposition against some piece of government-sponsored legislation. Political parties commonly allow their members a free vote on some matters of personal conscience.

In Australia, one of the major parties, the Australian Labor Party requires members to pledge their support for the collective decisions of the caucus, which theoretically prohibits them from "crossing the floor" in this sense; however, in practice, some Labor members disregard this pledge, despite the disciplinary action which may result. Senator Fatima Payman was elected to the Senate with the Labor Party in 2022. On 25 June 2024, Payman crossed the floor to vote in favour of a resolution supporting Australian recognition of Palestinian statehood, voting with the crossbench against the government and opposition. Payman was suspended from the Labor Party while discussions took place about her willingness to follow the Caucus solidarity required of Labor members, but Payman resigned on 4 July 2024, becoming an independent Senator.

Among other parties, crossing the floor is rare, although then Senator Barnaby Joyce of the National Party crossed the floor 28 times. Tasmanian Senator Sir Reg Wright voted against his own party, the Liberal Party, on 150 occasions, which has been claimed as a record for this form of crossing the floor in the Australian Parliament.

By convention in Australia, members of the government and shadow ministries are bound to vote as per the party room line and when they fail to do so, they are expected to resign or offer to resign from their ministry position. This results in a situation where crossing the floor as a minister or shadow minister has become viewed as a lack of confidence in whoever the current leader happens to be. In 2026, this convention resulted in the split of the Liberal–National Coalition, after three National shadow ministers voted against laws in the wake of the 2025 Bondi Beach shooting despite the Coalition officially supporting them. Sussan Ley, the Leader of the Opposition and a member of the Liberal Party, the senior partner in the Coalition, accepted their resignations. The situation rapidly escalated with all National shadow ministers resigning their positions, and on 22 January 2026, the full withdrawal of the Nationals from the Coalition, breaking it up.

== See also ==
- Aaya Ram Gaya Ram, a term used in India for party-switching politicians
- Article 70 of the Constitution of Bangladesh
- Anti-defection law (India)
- Aisle (political term)
- Conscience vote
- Crossover voting
- Floor crossing (South Africa)
- Katak (Malaysia)
- List of British politicians who have crossed the floor
- List of Canadian politicians who have crossed the floor
- List of United States representatives who switched parties
- List of United States senators who switched parties
- Party switching for a similar concept
- Trasformismo for a similar concept in Italy
- Waka-jumping
- Whip (politics), in UK politics voting against the party line is known as "defying the whip"
- Party discipline
