= Karan Singh Dalal =

Indian politician

Member of Haryana Legislative Assembly
- In office 2014–2019
- Preceded by: Subhash Choudhary
- Succeeded by: Deepak Mangla
- Constituency: Palwal
- In office 1991–2009
- Preceded by: Subhash Chand
- Succeeded by: Subhash Choudhary
- Constituency: Palwal

Personal details
- Born: July 6, 1957 (age 68)
- Party: Indian National Congress
- Spouse: Jyoti Dalal
- Occupation: Politician
- Known for: Former Minister and MLA

Karan Singh Dalal (born July 6, 1957) is a seasoned politician from Haryana, representing the Palwal Assembly constituency in Haryana. He is a five-time MLA. The firebrand Congress leader lost to Subhash Chaudhary of INLD in the 2009 assembly elections. He was elected for the first time in 1991 on an HVP ticket, then re-elected in 1996 and became a minister in the cabinet of the then chief minister. He was again elected in 2000, 2005, and 2014. He was also elected as the first chairman of the Haryana Administrative Reform Commission.

== Electoral record ==
Year	Election	Party	Constituency Name	Result
1991	8th Haryana Assembly	Haryana Vikas Party	Palwal	Won
1996	9th Haryana Assembly	Haryana Vikas Party	Palwal	Won
2000	10th Haryana Assembly	Republican Party of India	Palwal	Won
2005	11th Haryana Assembly	Indian National Congress	Palwal	Won
2009	12th Haryana Assembly	Indian National Congress	Palwal	Lost
2014	13th Haryana Assembly	Indian National Congress	Palwal	Won
2019	14th Haryana Assembly	Indian National Congress	Palwal	Lost
2024	15th Haryana Assembly	Indian National Congress	Palwal	Lost
