= Anti-defection law (India) =

Anti party-defection law in India / Anti defection Bill

Constitution (Fifty-second Amendment) Act, 1985

Parliament of India
- Long title: An Act further to amend the Constitution of India.
- Territorial extent: India
- Passed by: Lok Sabha
- Passed: 30 January 1985
- Passed by: Rajya Sabha
- Passed: 31 January 1985
- Assented to: 15 February 1985
- Commenced: 15 February 1985

Legislative history

Initiating chamber: Lok Sabha
- Introduced by: Rajiv Gandhi
- Introduced: 24 January 1985

Amended by
- Constitution (Ninety-First Amendment) Act, 2003

Related legislation
- Addition of Tenth Schedule in the Constitution of India

Summary
- Disqualification on grounds of defection.
- Status: In force

The Anti-Defection law, or the 52nd Amendment to the Indian Constitution is a constitutional amendment limiting the ability of politicians to switch parties in parliament. The Constitution was amended to prevent elected MLAs and MPs from changing parties.

Before the introduction of the anti-defection law, the election of both the Prime Minister and Chief Ministers of some of its states and territories had experienced instances of perceived uncertainty resulting from legislators changing their political allegiance. It may be noted that the 'political party' was not a recognised word in the Constitution of India at that time. By one estimate, almost 50 percent of the 4,000 legislators elected to union and federal parliaments in the 1967 and 1971 general elections subsequently defected, leading to political turmoil in the country.

The law sought to limit such defections in India. In 1985, 52nd Amendment to the Constitution of India was passed by the Parliament of India to achieve this, which resulted in the introduction of the new word 'Political Party' in the Constitution of India. Thus, political parties got recognition in the Constitution. And added the Tenth Schedule to the constitution.

Following recommendations from many constitutional bodies, Parliament in 2003 passed the Ninety-first Amendment to the Constitution of India. This strengthened the act by adding provisions for the disqualification of defectors and banning them from being appointed as ministers for a period of time.

== Background ==
Beginning in the 1960s, the rise of coalition politics increased the incidence of defections as elected representatives sought to occupy a berth in the cabinet of ministers. (It may be noted that in many countries, including the UK, a Government minister does not have to be a member of either House of Parliament) As an example, in 1967 a legislator Gaya Lal changed his allegiance three times in two weeks, and gave rise to the infamous expression Aaya Ram Gaya Ram ("Ram has come, Ram has gone").

Between 1957 and 1967, the Congress (I) party emerged as the sole beneficiary of defections. It lost 98 of its legislators but gained 419, whilst those who left other parties and who did not then join Congress (I) formed separate new parties with the aim of exerting power on administration in the future through coalition government, rather than supporting established administration. This situation gave Congress (I) a strong hold of power on the administration. In the 1967 elections, approximately 3,500 members were elected to legislative assemblies of various states and union territories; out of those elected representatives, around 550 subsequently defected from their parent parties, and some legislatives crossed the floor more than once.

To tackle the scourge of political party defection, during the fourth Lok Sabha in 1967 a committee was formed under the chairmanship of Y. B. Chavan. This committee submitted a report in 1968 which led to a first attempt to submit an anti-defection bill in Parliament. Although the opposition was supportive of the bill, the Government, then led by Indira Gandhi, referred it for consideration by a Joint Select Committee; it did not emerge from committee before all other legislative proposals were voided by subsequent elections.

1977–79 was one of the crucial periods in Indian politics when the first-ever national non-Congress administration, led by Morarji Desai, was driven out of power due to the defection of 76 parliamentarians. This caused political uncertainty until 1979, when Gandhi was elected by a clear majority. There was a definite trend in the political landscape of India during the 1970-80s. Whenever there was a Congress-led administration at the center, the regional administrations fell due to the defection of non-Congress elected representatives. Then Chief Minister of Karnataka, Virendra Patil, called this trend a "goldrush". Though corruption was a global phenomenon, the Gandhi period saw the disruptive politics of defection become rampant in India.

With rising public opinion for an anti-defection law, immediately after securing a clear majority in 1984, Rajiv Gandhi proposed the new anti-defection bill in the Parliament. After marathon debates, both the Lok Sabha and Rajya Sabha unanimously approved the bill on 30 and 31 January 1985, respectively. The bill received the President's approval on 15 February 1985 and the act came into effect on 18 March 1985. The law laid out the process for disqualifying an elected member for the remaining term, who either resigned from, voted against the will of the belonging party or remained absent during voting on a crucial bill. However, the law allowed mergers and splits of political parties, allowing splits in the party by one-third of its members and merger (joining another party) by two-thirds of other party members. Experts believed defections should not be viewed in terms of numbers alone and should be seen in the context of how such political defections damage the people's mandate. But Ashoke Kumar Sen justified the act of allowing mass defections by terming it as freeing the legislators from "chains of obscurantism and orthodox politics". Recently,⁣ in April 2021, Sachin Pilot and his MLAs ( congress MLA's of Rajasthan ) moved to the high court and challenged the anti-defection law; stating that the provision should not jeopardize the fundamental freedom of speech and expression of a member of the house. They have also demanded the clause 2(1)(a), to be declared ultra vires (outside the scope) of the basic structure of the Constitution, and the freedom of speech and expression under Article 19(1)(a).

== Intent ==
The primary intentions of the law were:

- To curb political corruption, which was seen as a necessary first step to addressing other forms of corruption in the country. According to the then Central Vigilance Conmissioner, U. C. Aggarwal, the political arena has to be corruption-free to motivate other, lower levels to free themselves from corruption.
- To strengthen democracy by bringing stability to administration and ensuring legislative programmes of the Government are not jeopardised by a defecting parliamentarian
- To make members of parliaments more responsible and loyal to the political parties with whom they were aligned at the time of their election. Many believe that the party allegiance plays a key role in their election success.

The YB Chavan committee suggested that a member who changes party allegiance for monetary benefit or other forms of greed, such as a promise of executive office, should not only be removed from parliament but also barred from contesting elections for a specified time.

== The law ==
The anti-defection law enshrined through the introduction of the Tenth Schedule in the Constitution of India comprises 8 paragraphs. The following is a brief summary of the contents of the law:

- Paragraph-1: Interpretation. This section handles the definitions of distinct terms applied in laying out the legislation.
- Paragraph-2: Disqualification on grounds of defection. This section deals with the crux of the legislation, specifying factors on which a member could be disqualified from the Parliament or the State assembly. Provisions in para 2.1(a) provide disqualification of a member if he or she "voluntarily gives up the membership of such political party", whereas paragraph 2.1(b) provisions, addresses a situation when a member votes or abstains from any crucial voting contrary to the directive circulated by his/her respective political party. Paragraph 2.2 states that any member, after being elected as a representative of a certain political party, shall be disqualified if he/she joins any other political party after the election. Paragraph 2.3 states that a nominated member shall be disqualified if he/she joins any political party after six months from the date he/she takes his seat.
- Paragraph-3: Omitted after amending the schedule by the Ninety-first Amendment act – 2003, which exempted disqualifications arising out of splits with one-third of the members defecting from a political party.
- Paragraph-4: Disqualification on ground of defection not to apply in case of merger. This paragraph excludes from disqualification in the case of mergers of political parties. Provided if the said merger is with two-thirds of the members of the legislative party who have consented to merge with another political party.
- Paragraph-5: Exemption. This paragraph provides exemptions to the Speaker, Chairman and Deputy-Chairman of various legislative Houses.
- Paragraph-6: Decision on questions as to disqualification on ground of defection. This provision mandates the Chairman or the Speaker of the respective legislative house to be the ultimate decision-making authority in case of any disqualification that arises.
- Paragraph-7: Bar of jurisdiction of courts. This provision bars any court jurisdiction in the case of disqualification of a member under this schedule. This paragraph was declared unconstitutional by the Supreme Court of India in Kihoto Hollohon vs Zacillu, 1992. The Court held that the decision of the speaker or chairman is subject to judicial review under Article 32 and 226 of the Indian Constitution.
- Paragraph-8: Rules. This paragraph deals with framing the rules for disqualification. The schedule allows the Chairman and the Speaker to frame rules concerning their respective legislative houses to deal with the disqualification of members of their various houses of the legislature.

== Speaker's role ==
After enactment, some legislators and parties exploited loopholes in the law. There was evidence that the law did not fulfill the purpose of bringing a halt to political defection, and in fact legitimised mass defection by exempting from its provisions acts that it termed splits. For example, in 1990, Chandra Shekhar and 61 other parliamentarians did not receive penalties when they simultaneously changed allegiance. The Speaker of the Lok Sabha did not allow the defecting members of the breakaway faction of Janata Dal to explain their point of view. Another aspect of the law which was criticised was the role of the Speaker in deciding the cases arising out of political defections. The impartiality of the Speakers of various houses was questioned in regard to granting official recognition to different factions of political parties. Questions were raised about the nonpartisan role of the Speaker due to his/her political background with the party from which he/she was elected as the Speaker. In 1991, Janata Dal (S) was accused of undermining the spirit of the anti-defection law by keeping defecting members in ministerial posts. Later, all the opposition members of the house submitted an affidavit to the President of India, appealing to him to dismiss the ministers. Finally, responding to pressure to save the fallen dignity of the Speaker and of the House, the Prime Minister discharged the defecting members from their ministerial posts.

Some legal luminaries of the time suggested that a legitimate remedy be made accessible to legislators to seek protection from the Speaker's decision. They further proposed that the Speaker's decision pertaining to disqualification on grounds of defection should not be final, and recommended that a process of judicial review be made available to the members by empowering a judicial tribunal for dealing with such cases.

== Exceptions ==
The Election Commission of India (ECI) clarified that the Anti-Defection Law does not apply to Presidential elections and political parties cannot issue a whip to their MPs and MLAs regarding a specific candidate. The ECI affirmed that MPs and MLAs were at liberty "to vote for anyone or not to vote" in Presidential election. Furthermore, the Supreme Court had earlier observed that electors would not face penal provisions under the Tenth Schedule for their votes in Rajya Sabha elections

== Amendment ==
To make the existing law more effective in dealing with the frequent defections, an amendment was proposed to the Tenth Schedule in 2003. A committee headed by Pranab Mukherjee proposed the Constitution (Ninety-first Amendment) Bill, noting that the exception provided by allowing a split, granted in paragraph three of the Schedule, was being grossly exploited, causing multiple divisions in various political parties. Further, the committee observed, the lure of personal gain played a significant aspect in defections and resulted in political horse-trading. The bill was passed in one day by the Lok Sabha on 16 December 2003, and similarly passed by the Rajya Sabha on 18 December. Presidential consent was obtained on 1 January 2004 and the Constitution (Ninety-First Amendment) Act – 2003 was notified in the Gazette of India on 2 January 2004.

The amended act maintained that a member disqualified due to defection should not hold any ministerial post or any other remunerative political post until the term of his office as a member expired. The 2003 amended act excluded the provisions from the Tenth Schedule for authorizing the defections arising out of splits. The amended act also stipulated that the number of ministers in states and union territories should not exceed fifteen percent of the total number of members in the respective house.

== Recommended reforms ==
Reforms suggested by various bodies—including the Law Commission, Election Commission, National Constitution Review Commission, Dinesh Goswami Committee on electoral reforms, and Halim Committee on anti-defection law—can be read under the following heads.

== See also ==
- Crossing the floor
- Waka-jumping
- Party switching
- Aaya Ram Gaya Ram

== Bibliography ==
- Gehlot, N. S. (September 1991), "The Anti-Defection Act, 1985 and The Role of The Speaker", The Indian Journal of Political Science, 50 (3): 327–340, JSTOR 41855565
- Malhotra, G. C. (2005), The Anti-defection Law in India and Commonwealth, Lok Sabha Secretariat, ISBN 9788120004061
