= Rawatpara =

- Location within Uttar Pradesh Location within India Location within Asia
- Coordinates: 27.188691°N 78.0084426°E
- Country: India
- State: Uttar Pradesh
- Division: Agra
- District: Agra

Government
  - Type: Municipal Corporation
  - Body: Agra Municipal Corporation
- Elevation: 170 m (560 ft)

Language
  - Official: Hindi
- Time zone: UTC+5:30 (IST)
- Telephone code: 0562
- Vehicle registration: UP-80
- Website: Official District Website

Rawatpara is one of the oldest localities of the historic city of Agra, Uttar Pradesh, India. It is situated very close to Agra Fort and also the river Yamuna.

== Etymology ==
Rawatpara draws its name from the Hindu-origin title Rawat which means "the king".

== History ==
During a hunting trip near Agra when Salim, son of Akbar, the third Moghul emperor, had revolted and there was risk to Akbar's life due to skirmishes. A Hindu Brahmin protected Akbar's life until his troops arrived. Out of gratitude, Akbars granted the title of Rawat, a jagir and haveli to the Brahmin, and the area of Brahmin's jagir came to be known as Rawatpara. The Brahmin was given a title of "Bohare" by his won kinsmen. Brahmin's family continued to serve in the court of subsequent Mughal Empire rulers. However, oppressive Aurengzeb exerted the policy of forced conversion of Hindus to Islam. Rawats of Rawatpara, instead of converting to Islam, escaped to the wilds with whatever they could carry with them and moved towards the ravines of Chambal. In the process, the kin broke into small groups, many of whom settled down in the areas Kanpur and Shivpuri. The Haveli of Rawats at Rawatpara was abandoned. Over the years the place has assumed a new identity as a wholesale market for grains, pulses, spices etc.

Kanha Rawat, a Jat who along with Gokula raised the revolt against the oppressive rule of Aurangzeb and his policies of forced conversion of Hindus to Isam, was tortured, buried alive in a pit and killed here at Rawatpara.

== Economy ==
The best place to buy the famous Agra Petha and Dal Moth is Rawatpara. Most of the shops there are very old; some have been there since the Mughal period. It is also very close to Johari Bazar and Kinari Bazar, which are the most popular shopping markets for the locals and tourist alike.

== See also ==
- History of Agra
- Braj
- Gokula
- Kanha Rawat
