= Girraj Kishore Mahaur =

Indian politician

Girraj Kishore Bhajanlal Mahaur

Member of Harayana Legislative Assembly
- In office 1982–1987
- President: Zail Singh
- Prime Minister: Indira Gandhi
- Governor: Ganpatrao Devji Tapase
- Vice President: Mohammad Hidayatullah

Personal details
- Born: Girraj Kishore Bhajanlalji Mahaur; 1950 (age 75–76) Hassanpur, Faridabad district, Punjab (now Haryana)
- Party: Indian National Congress
- Other political affiliations: Lok Dal
- Parent: Bhajanlalji Mahaur

Girraj Kishore Bhajanlal Mahaur is an Indian politician and former Member of legislative assembly for Hassanpur constituency (Now Hodal (Vidhan Sabha constituency)) as Lokdal candidate in Haryana 1982. He belongs to the Mahaur Koli caste of Haryana.
