= Ramji Lal =

Indian politician (1932–2021)

Member of Parliament, Rajya Sabha
- In office 1994-2000
- Constituency: Haryana
- In office 1992-1993

Personal details
- Born: 25 March 1932
- Died: 15 January 2021 (aged 88)
- Party: Indian National Congress

Ramji Lal (25 March 1932 – 15 January 2021) was an Indian politician. He was a Member of Parliament, representing Haryana in the Rajya Sabha the upper house of India's Parliament, and a member of the Indian National Congress.
