= Hassanpur Assembly constituency =

Constituency of the Haryana legislative assembly in India

Coordinates: 27.97888°N 77.49239°E

- Former constituency for the Haryana Legislative Assembly

Constituency details
- Country: India
- Region: North India
- State: Haryana
- Established: 1967
- Abolished: 2005
- Total electors: 1,38,284

Hassanpur was an assembly constituency in the Indian state of Haryana. This constituency was proceeded by the Hodal Assembly constituency.

== Members of the Legislative Assembly ==
Election	Member	Party
1967	Gaya Lal	Independent politician
1968	Manohar Singh	Indian National Congress
1972	Bihari Lal	Indian National Congress
1977	Gaya Lal	Janata Party
1982	Gir Raj Kishore	Lokdal
1987	Udai Bhan	Lokdal
1991	Ram Rattan	Indian National Congress
1996	Jagdish Nayar	Haryana Vikas Party
2000	Udai Bhan	Independent politician
2005	Udai Bhan	Indian National Congress

== Election results ==
=== Assembly Election 2005 ===
2005 Haryana Legislative Assembly election: Hassanpur
Party	Candidate	Votes	%	±%
INC	Udai Bhan	45,683	50.10%	▲44.26
INLD	Jagdish Nayar	40,352	44.25%	▲1.73
BJP	Puran Lal	1,571	1.72%	New
Independent	Sunder Lal	928	1.02%	New
BSP	Haripal	678	0.74%	New
Independent	Daya Chand	543	0.60%	New
Independent	Satvir	407	0.45%	New
Margin of victory		5,331	5.85%	▼0.50
Turnout		91,181	65.94%	▼0.72
Registered electors		1,38,284		▲20.46
INC gain from Independent		Swing	▲1.23	

=== Assembly Election 2000 ===
2000 Haryana Legislative Assembly election: Hassanpur
Party	Candidate	Votes	%	±%
Independent	Udai Bhan	37,390	48.87%	New
INLD	Jagdish Nayar	32,535	42.52%	New
INC	Ram Rattan	4,468	5.84%	▼0.90
SP	Ishwar Prasad Alok	736	0.96%	New
Independent	Karan Singh	666	0.87%	New
Margin of victory		4,855	6.35%	▼1.71
Turnout		76,513	67.72%	▲5.77
Registered electors		1,14,792		▲1.10
Independent gain from HVP		Swing	▲7.90	

=== Assembly Election 1996 ===
1996 Haryana Legislative Assembly election: Hassanpur
Party	Candidate	Votes	%	±%
HVP	Jagdish Nayar	28,318	40.97%	New
Independent	Udai Bhan	22,748	32.91%	New
SAP	Lakhmi Chand	6,611	9.56%	New
INC	Ram Rattan	4,660	6.74%	▼30.37
BSP	Siri Chand	2,401	3.47%	New
AIIC(T)	Chandan Singh	1,968	2.85%	New
Arya Samaj	Jaivir	389	0.56%	New
Margin of victory		5,570	8.06%	▲6.82
Turnout		69,127	63.57%	▼1.25
Registered electors		1,13,541		▲4.88
HVP gain from INC		Swing	▲3.86	

=== Assembly Election 1991 ===
1991 Haryana Legislative Assembly election: Hassanpur
Party	Candidate	Votes	%	±%
INC	Ram Rattan	24,962	37.11%	▼1.31
JP	Udai Bhan	24,127	35.87%	New
JD	Lal Singh	11,402	16.95%	New
BJP	Santa Ram	3,736	5.55%	New
Independent	Prabhu Dayal	1,007	1.50%	New
Independent	Umed Singh	684	1.02%	New
Independent	Ghasi Ram	532	0.79%	New
Margin of victory		835	1.24%	▼5.95
Turnout		67,271	64.98%	▼2.04
Registered electors		1,08,263		▲11.68
INC gain from LKD		Swing	▼8.49	

=== Assembly Election 1987 ===
1987 Haryana Legislative Assembly election: Hassanpur
Party	Candidate	Votes	%	±%
LKD	Udai Bhan	28,371	45.60%	▲5.72
INC	Chhote Lal	23,899	38.41%	▲10.78
Independent	Ram Chand	2,655	4.27%	New
VHP	Babu Lal	2,596	4.17%	New
Independent	Chandan Singh	2,545	4.09%	New
Independent	Total Ram	808	1.30%	New
Independent	Bharat Singh	319	0.51%	New
Margin of victory		4,472	7.19%	▼5.01
Turnout		62,215	65.55%	▼1.15
Registered electors		96,939		▲18.78
LKD hold		Swing	▲5.72	

=== Assembly Election 1982 ===
1982 Haryana Legislative Assembly election: Hassanpur
Party	Candidate	Votes	%	±%
LKD	Gir Raj Kishore	21,259	39.88%	New
Independent	Gaya Lal	14,755	27.68%	New
INC	Bihari Lal	14,731	27.63%	▲15.98
Independent	Ram Rattan	1,393	2.61%	New
JP	Bhup Ram	312	0.59%	▼63.08
Independent	Chandgi Ram	273	0.51%	New
Margin of victory		6,504	12.20%	▼31.77
Turnout		53,311	67.02%	▲7.95
Registered electors		81,609		▲18.45
LKD gain from JP		Swing	▼23.79	

=== Assembly Election 1977 ===
1977 Haryana Legislative Assembly election: Hassanpur
Party	Candidate	Votes	%	±%
JP	Gaya Lal	25,163	63.66%	New
Independent	Chhote Lal	7,785	19.70%	New
INC	Daryao	4,604	11.65%	▼34.92
VHP	Charan Singh	719	1.82%	New
Independent	Hardayal	566	1.43%	New
Independent	Dharamvir Singh	369	0.93%	New
Independent	Harlal	319	0.81%	New
Margin of victory		17,378	43.97%	▲36.51
Turnout		39,525	58.00%	▲2.33
Registered electors		68,895		▲5.63
JP gain from INC		Swing	▲17.10	

=== Assembly Election 1972 ===
1972 Haryana Legislative Assembly election: Hassanpur
Party	Candidate	Votes	%	±%
INC	Bihari Lal	16,716	46.56%	▼13.61
Akhil Bhartiya Arya Sabha	Gaya Lal	14,039	39.11%	New
Independent	Umrao Singh	3,839	10.69%	New
Independent	Baboo	1,305	3.64%	New
Margin of victory		2,677	7.46%	▼26.35
Turnout		35,899	56.69%	▲10.68
Registered electors		65,225		▲11.72
INC hold		Swing	▼13.61	

=== Assembly Election 1968 ===
1968 Haryana Legislative Assembly election: Hassanpur
Party	Candidate	Votes	%	±%
INC	Manohar Singh	15,583	60.17%	▲32.84
SWA	Shyah Sunder	6,828	26.37%	New
ABJS	Man Singh	2,750	10.62%	▼7.18
Independent	Kanhaiya	736	2.84%	New
Margin of victory		8,755	33.81%	▲32.83
Turnout		25,897	45.76%	▼20.24
Registered electors		58,380		▲2.09
INC gain from Independent		Swing	▲31.86	

=== Assembly Election 1967 ===
1967 Haryana Legislative Assembly election: Hassanpur
Party	Candidate	Votes	%	±%
Independent	Gaya Lal	10,458	28.31%	New
INC	M. Singh	10,098	27.34%	New
ABJS	Man Singh	6,574	17.80%	New
Independent	Chiranjilal	4,713	12.76%	New
RPI	Ghasi Ram	2,331	6.31%	New
Independent	Puranlal	1,328	3.59%	New
Independent	Harkishan	1,097	2.97%	New
Independent	K. Singh	342	0.93%	New
Margin of victory		360	0.97%	
Turnout		36,941	68.77%	
Registered electors		57,183		
Independent win (new seat)				
