= Aisle (political term) =

American term referring to partisanship in government

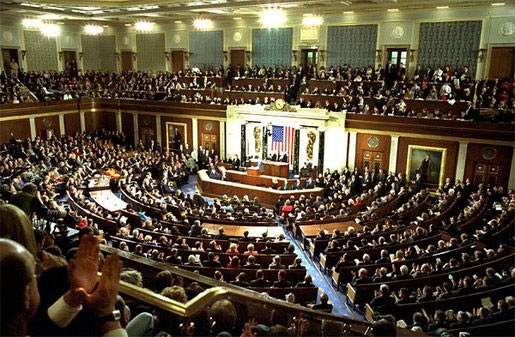
The U.S. House of Representatives is divided by several aisles

In the United States, the two major political parties, the Republicans and the Democrats, are often referred to as "the two sides of the aisle."

== Origin of the usage ==
Usage of the term "aisle" comes from the United States Congress. In the Senate, desks are arranged in the chamber in a semicircular pattern and the desks are divided by a wide central aisle. By tradition, Democrats sit on the right of the center aisle (as viewed from the presiding officer's chair) while Republicans sit on the left. Unlike in the Senate, there are no assigned desks in the House of Representatives chamber, but as in the Senate, Democrats sit on the right of the center aisle (as viewed from the presiding officer's chair) while Republicans sit on the left.

A member of one party who votes for legislation supported by the other party and generally opposed by his own party is described as "crossing the aisle" (a similar phrase used in countries operating under the Westminster system, is "crossing the floor").

== "Both sides of the aisle" ==
A (proposed) law that has bipartisan support is said to be supported by both sides of the aisle.

== See also ==
- Crossing the floor
