= Hodal Assembly constituency =

Legislative Assembly constituency in Haryana State, India

Coordinates: 27.89°N 77.37°E

Hodal
- Constituency No. 83 for the Haryana Legislative Assembly

Constituency details
- Country: India
- Region: North India
- State: Haryana
- District: Palwal
- Lok Sabha constituency: Faridabad
- Total electors: 1,97,043
- Reservation: SC

Member of Legislative Assembly
- 15th Haryana Legislative Assembly
- Incumbent Harinder Singh
- Party: Bharatiya Janata Party
- Elected year: 2024

Hodal is one of the 90 Legislative Assembly constituencies of Haryana state in India. It is part of Palwal district and is reserved for candidates belonging to the Scheduled Castes. This constituency was previously known as the Hassanpur Assembly constituency.

== Members of the Legislative Assembly ==
Year	Member	Party
Till 2009: Constituency did not exist
2009	Jagdish Nayar	Indian National Lok Dal
2014	Udai Bhan	Indian National Congress
2019	Jagdish Nayar	Bharatiya Janata Party
2024	Harinder Singh	Bharatiya Janata Party

== Election results ==
=== Assembly Election 2024 ===
2024 Haryana Legislative Assembly election: Hodal
Party	Candidate	Votes	%	±%
BJP	Harinder Singh	68,865	48.79%	▲2.99
INC	Udai Bhan	66,270	46.95%	▲3.93
Independent	Naveen Rohila	2,077	1.47%	New
INLD	Sunil Kumar	1,838	1.30%	▼0.11
NOTA	None of the Above	393	0.28%	▼0.19
Margin of victory		2,595	1.84%	▼0.94
Turnout		1,41,146	71.77%	▲3.44
Registered electors		1,97,043		▲10.17
BJP hold		Swing	▲2.99	

=== Assembly Election 2019 ===
2019 Haryana Legislative Assembly election: Hodal
Party	Candidate	Votes	%	±%
BJP	Jagdish Nayar	55,864	45.80%	▲21.91
INC	Udai Bhan	52,477	43.02%	▲1.48
JJP	Yashveer	8,590	7.04%	New
INLD	Ram Pal	1,724	1.41%	▼30.56
BSP	Gaya Lal	874	0.72%	▲0.20
Margin of victory		3,387	2.78%	▼6.79
Turnout		1,21,981	68.33%	▼7.36
Registered electors		1,78,516		▲10.66
BJP gain from INC		Swing	▲4.25	

=== Assembly Election 2014 ===
2014 Haryana Legislative Assembly election: Hodal
Party	Candidate	Votes	%	±%
INC	Udai Bhan	50,723	41.54%	▼5.18
INLD	Jagdish Nayar	39,043	31.98%	▼17.53
BJP	Ramrattan	29,170	23.89%	▲23.29
HJC(BL)	Subhash Singh	1,106	0.91%	New
BSP	Mahesh Rana	628	0.51%	▼0.54
Margin of victory		11,680	9.57%	▲6.78
Turnout		1,22,097	75.69%	▲0.03
Registered electors		1,61,317		▲29.90
INC gain from INLD		Swing	▼7.97	

=== Assembly Election 2009 ===
2009 Haryana Legislative Assembly election: Hodal
Party	Candidate	Votes	%	±%
INLD	Jagdish Nayar	46,515	49.51%	New
INC	Udai Bhan	43,894	46.72%	New
BSP	Trilok Chand	995	1.06%	New
BJP	Mahaveer Singh	560	0.60%	New
Independent	Hari Chand	509	0.54%	New
Margin of victory		2,621	2.79%	
Turnout		93,948	75.65%	
Registered electors		1,24,181		
INLD win (new seat)				

== See also ==
- List of constituencies of the Haryana Legislative Assembly
- Palwal district
