= Jagdish Nayar =

Indian politician

Jagdish Nayar is an Indian politician. He was elected to the Haryana Legislative Assembly from Hodal in the 2019 Haryana Legislative Assembly election as a member of the Bharatiya Janata Party.
