= Deepak Mangla =

Indian politician

In 2026, he was appointed a vice-president of the Bharatiya Janata Party’s Haryana unit.

Deepak Mangla is an Indian politician. He was elected to the Haryana Legislative Assembly from Palwal in the 2019 Haryana Legislative Assembly election as a member of the Bharatiya Janata Party.
