= Hathin =

- Town
- Location in Haryana, India Hathin (India)
- Coordinates: 28.0500°N 77.2333°E
- Country: India
- State: Haryana
- District: Palwal

Government
  - MLA: Mohd Israil (INC)

Area
  - Total: 365 km^{2} (141 sq mi)
- Elevation: 194 m (636 ft)

Population (2021)
  - Total: 30,000
  - Density: 82/km^{2} (210/sq mi)

Languages
  - Official: Hindi, Haryanvi, Mewati
- Time zone: UTC+5:30 (IST)
- Pin code: 121103
- Telephone Code: 01275
- ISO 3166 code: IN-HR
- Vehicle registration: HR 52
- Literacy rate: 71.97 %
- Lok Sabha constituency: Faridabad Lok Sabha Constituency
- Sex ratio: 879 ♂/♀
- Website: haryana.gov.in

Hathin is a town and a Municipal Committee in Palwal district of Haryana in India. It has the highest Muslim population in the Palwal district. It lies within the National Capital Region (NCR) as well as the historical Mewat and Braj region of India.

== Geography ==
It lies in the National Capital Region, located 65 kilometres south of Delhi, 10 kilometres west from NH44 and 10 kilometres south from KMP (Western Peripheral Expressway) and the upcoming Haryana Orbital Rail Corridor (HORC) and also 10 kilometres east from longest expressway in India (Delhi-Vadodara-Mumbai Expressway).

== Governance ==
Hathin is a Haryana Legislative Assembly constituency segment, within the Faridabad Lok Sabha constituency.

== History ==
Circa 150 BCE to 100 CE Shunga Empire or Kushan Empire era Hindu temple guard rail pillars were excavated from a filled well of Bhadas village and from Hathin. The pillars are exhibited in the Haryana State Museum. The railing pillars have images of Yaksha and three mortises carved on them. These pillars may have belonged to the same monument as the lens-shaped mortises because both have the same size, the color of the stone, distances between the three mortises carved on the pillars and yaksha carvings. The yaksha on the Bhadas pillar stands on protome of a Cloven hoofed animal, with the raised right hand (now-broken) holding a flower and the left hand on the hip holding up the drapery. Roundel on top of the pillar is a composite animal with protome of deer and hindquarters of makra superimposed over a lotus in bloom.

Hathin is part of the historical Mewat region and Braj region of India.

== Infrastructure ==
Electricity is provided by DHBVN.

State transport Haryana buses connects the town to Palwal and with cities like Gurgaon, Faridabad, Delhi, Sohna and Chandigarh etc.

An updated Community Health Center provides health facilities.

A new Rest House is under construction.

On 27 May 2015, Haryana chief minister Manohar Lal Khattar announced a budget of Rs 40 crore (400m) for a four-lane highway project from Palwal to Hathin and a bypass from Hathin to link NH-44. 5 crore to Hathin, 150 crore for improvement of irrigation facilities and improvement of existing government girls school buildings.

== Demographics ==
The Hathin Municipal Committee has a population of 17,461 of which 10,089 are male and 7,372 are female according to Census India 2011. The population of children ranging from 0-6 is 2,731, which is 15.64% of the total population of Hathin (MC). The female ratio is on par with state average of 879. The child ratio is 820 against a state average of 834. The literacy rate is 71.97% against the state average of 75.55%.

Town	Population	Hindu	Muslim	Christian	Sikh	Buddhist	Jain	Others	Not Stated
Hathin	17,461	60.06%	38.96%	0.08%	0.01%	0.09%	0.64%	0.00%	0.17%

== Transport ==
=== Rail ===
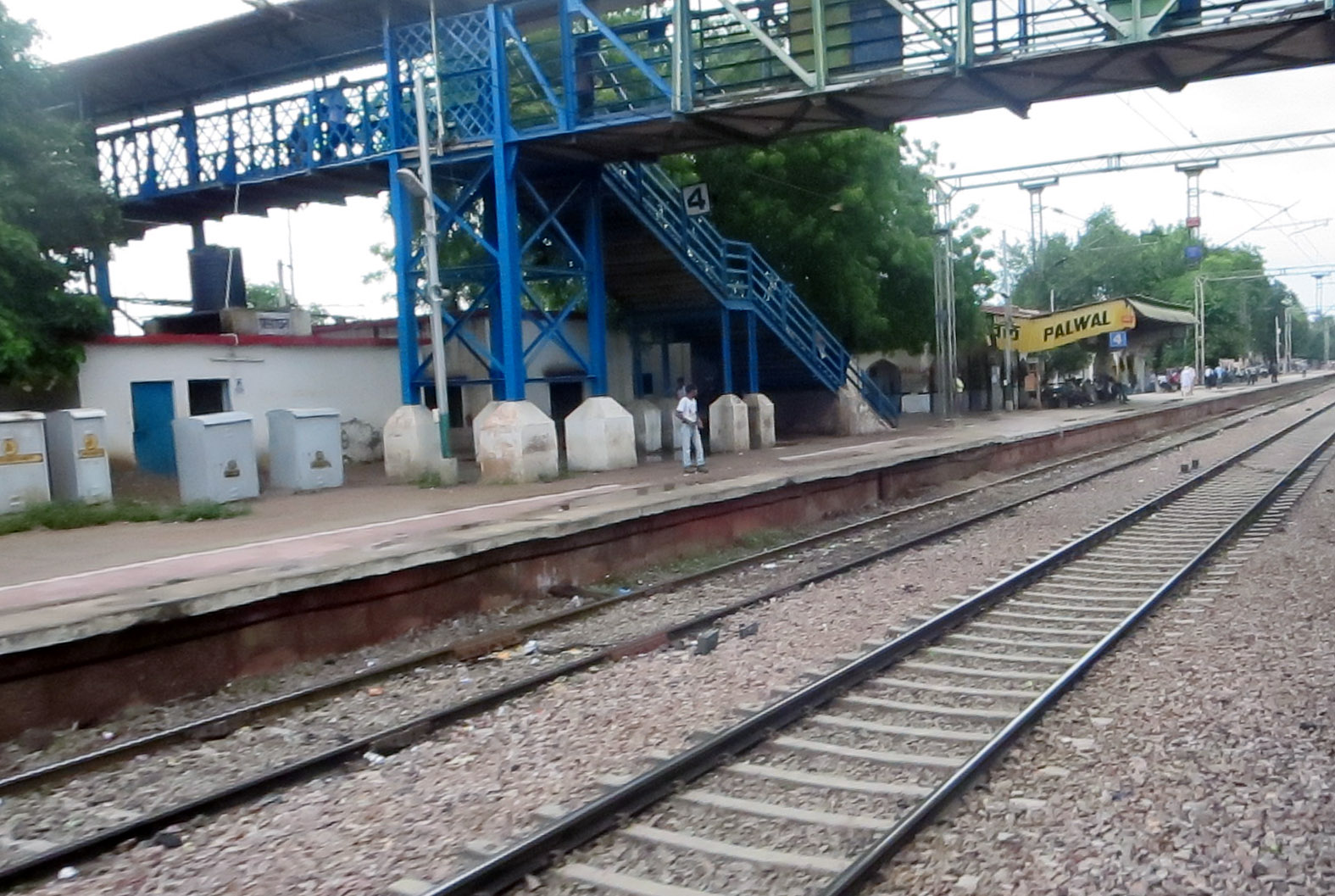
Palwal Railway station

Located 15 kilometres (9 miles) from Hathin, Palwal is the nearest railway station. The station has 10 platforms. It is one of the largest in India. Numerous trains connect Palwal to Delhi. Fast trains are available for longer distances. Women-only trains run between Palwal and Delhi.

Nearest Metro Station to Hathin is Raja Nahar Singh Ballabhgarh located 37 kilometres towards Faridabad.

== Education ==
=== Schools ===
- Govt. Model Sanskriti Sr. Sec. School, Hathin
- Modish Public School, Hathin
- KCM World School, Bhamnola Jogi Hathin
- Shanti Niketan Public School, Hathin
- Tagore Shiksha Niketan Public School, Hathin
- St. John's Public School, Hathin
- Yadav Academy School, Hathin
- Sehrawat Sr. Sec. School, Hathin
- Govt. Model Sanskriti Sr. Sec. School, Buraka Hathin
- Govt. Girls Sr. Sec. School, Hathin
- Govt. Primary School, Hathin
- New D.P.S, Bhanguri Hathin
- Krishna Public School, Swamika Hathin
- ASM Convent Public School, Hathin
- SR Mewat Public School, Hathin
- St. John's Public School, Rupraka Hathin
- Swami Sarvanand Public School, Hathin
- Sehrawat World School, Hathin

=== Colleges ===
- Sehrawat Degree College of Education, Hathin
- Yadav Degree College, Hathin
- Government Industrial Training Institute, Hathin
- Government Polytechnic Uttawar Hathin
- Mewat School of Education, Hathin
- Government College, Hathin (Palwal)

== See also ==
- Delhi-Mumbai Industrial Corridor Project
