= Palwal district =

- District of Haryana
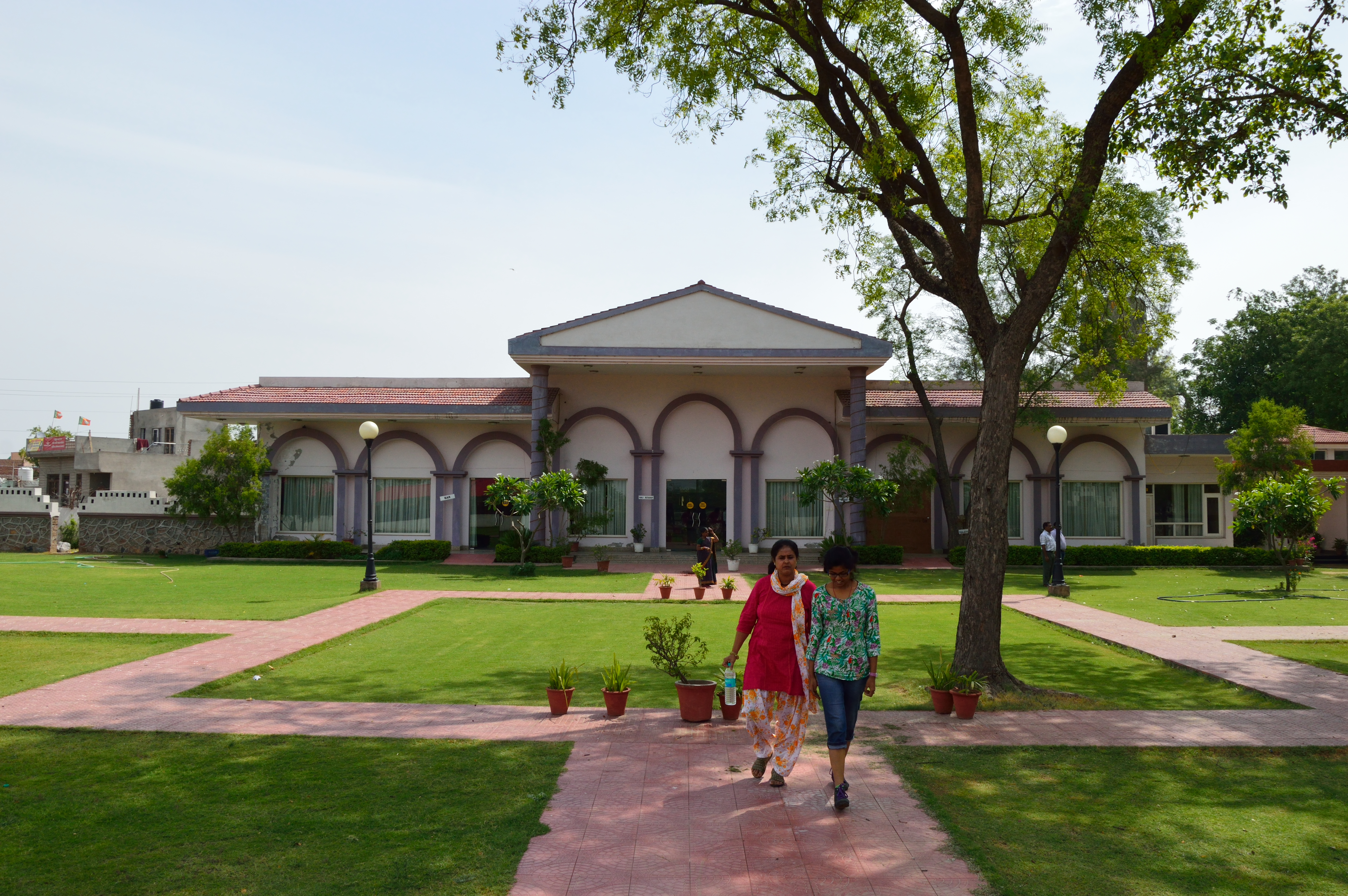
- Dabchick Tourist Complex in Hodal

- Location in Haryana
- Country: India
- State: Haryana
- Division: Faridabad
- Headquarters: Palwal
- Tehsils: Palwal, Hodal, Hathin

Area
  - Total: 1,359 km^{2} (525 sq mi)

Population (2011)
  - Total: 1,042,708
  - Density: 767.3/km^{2} (1,987/sq mi)
  - Urban: 236,544

Demographics
  - Literacy: 70.32%
  - Sex ratio: 879
- Time zone: UTC+05:30 (IST)
- Vehicle registration: HR 30 (PALWAL) HR 73 (RTA PALWAL) HR 52 (HATHIN) HR 50 (HODAL)
- Major highways: 3 (NH-44); KMP Expressway; KGP Expressway
- Average annual precipitation: 60–100 mm
- Lok Sabha constituencies: Faridabad (shared with Faridabad district)
- Vidhan Sabha constituencies: 4
- Website: palwal.gov.in

Palwal district is the 21st district of Haryana state in Delhi NCR region of northern India. It was created on 15 August 2008. Palwal City is the headquarters of the district. It is part of the Braj region.

The city is situated 60 km (37 mi) from Delhi, 29 km (18 mi) from Faridabad and 50 km (31 mi) from Gurugram on the Delhi-Agra national highway. The area of the city is 40 km^{2} (15 sq mi).

== Etymology ==
According to legend, the city of Palwal is named for the demon Palwalasur who was said to have ruled during the reign of Pandavas.

== History ==
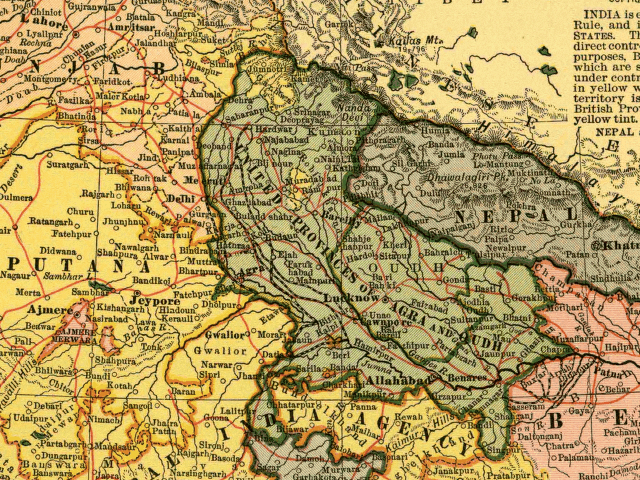
Palwal was part of Punjab Province in 1903.

=== Vedic period ===
Palwal is supposed to figure in the earliest Aryan traditions under the name of Apelava, part of the Pandava kingdom of Indraprastha, which was later restored by Vikramaditya.

==== Mound ====
Kaserua Khera mound in Manpur village, 20 km south of Palwal and 7 km west of Aurangabad on NH-44, is a 3 acres mound with an extensive layer of 3,000 years old mahabharta era Indo-Aryan vedic painted grey ware culture (PGW) of western Gangetic plain and the Ghaggar-Hakra-Saraswati River Valley, of which first ever ecavation commenced in 2023. The excavations of 2-m deposit of PGW revealed 20 m x 1 m cremation section, PGW sherds, Red Ware sherds, charred and uncharred animal bones, two burnt human jaws and a portion on human skull suggesting these relate to death rituals and cremation of human body. Other finds include an motif of four-legged animal with a horn and tail on a PGW pot sherd (first ever such animal motif in PGW, which is also filled with dots suggesting it is a deer). The site has a rich variety of PGW in terms of painting, designs, fabric and colours. In 2025, Haryana government announced a INR 95 crore restoration plan for upgrade of 20 monuments across the state including the Kaserua Khera mound.

=== Mughal period ===
During the reign of Mughal Empire, the freedom fighter Kanha Rawat carried forward the legacy of Jat leader Gokula to fight against Aurangzeb. After Kanha refused to convert his religion to Islam, Aurangzeb had him buried alive at Rawatpara. (Note: In accordance with the "al atuba ayat no five" (Surah at-Taubah (Repentance) 9:5), which states "And when the sacred months have passed, then kill them wherever you find them and capture them and besiege them and sit in wait for them at every place of ambush. But if they should repent, establish prayer, and give zakāh, let them [go] on their way. Indeed, Allāh is Forgiving and Merciful.") A statue of Kanha was unveiled inside the park in February 2014 by Vishvendra Singh - the scion of Bharatpur State. Kanha Rawat Memorial Park was constructed around his samadhi at his native Bahin village in Hathin tehsil.

=== British Raj ===
During the British Raj, Palwal was a part of the Punjab Province and Gurgaon district.

Mahatma Gandhi was first arrested at Palwal railway station. The historical building "Gandhi Ashrama" was erected in memory of the incident. Uttawar forced sterilisations, occurred when on November 6, 1976, when mass vasectomy of nearly 800 men of Uttawar village was done, in Palwal district, Haryana during India’s Emergency imposed by Indira Gandhi.

=== Independent India ===
On 15 August 1979, Gurgaon district was divided, with Palwal becoming part of the new Faridabad district. Later, Palwal became the 21st district of Haryana on 15 August 2008.

== Geography ==
=== Topography ===
Palwal is located at 28.15°N 77.33°E, between the eastern bank of Yamuna river and the western flank of Aravalli mountain range. It has an average elevation of 195 metres (639 ft).

=== Forests ===
The Forest Department aims to increase forestation for soil conservation in the district, in line with the National Forests Policy of the Ministry of Environment and Forests. According to the plan, about one-third of the geographical area should be under tree cover. In order to achieve this objective, large-scale plantings have been undertaken by the community, panchayat, government and private land over the last 20 years. Saplings of eucalyptus, shisham, neem, and other fruit plants were distributed free of costs to farmers to plant in their fields.

== Demographics ==
According to the 2011 census, Palwal district had a population of 1,042,708. Its population growth rate over the decade 2001–2011 was 25.49%. Palwal had a sex ratio of 879 females for every 1,000 males, and a literacy rate of 70.3%. Scheduled Castes make up 19.48% of the population.

=== Religion ===
Religion in Palwal district (2011)
Religion	Percent
Hinduism	79.25%
Islam	20.00%
Other or not stated	0.75%

Block	Hindu	Muslim	Other
Palwal	473,558	26,730	5,965
Hathin	109,003	159,298	714
Hodal	243,781	22,538	1,121

The region is located at the border of Mewat and Braj. Mewat is Muslim-dominated while Braj is Hindu-dominated.

=== Language ===
Languages of Palwal district (2011)
1. Hindi (88.3%)
2. Mewati (3.81%)
3. Urdu (3.59%)
4. Haryanvi (3.22%)
5. Others (1.11%)

At the time of the 2011 Census of India, 88.27% of the population spoke Hindi, 3.81% Mewati, 3.59% Urdu and 3.22% Haryanvi as their first language. The local language is Braj. Mewati is spoken in the Hathin tehsil.

=== Culture ===
Palwal has an annual festival known as "Baldev Chhat Ka Mela" which celebrates the legend of Balarama killing the demon Palwasur during the reign of Pandavas. There is also a temple dedicated to Balaram near the chowk (marketplace) of the municipal office.

== Administration ==
=== District setup ===
Palwal district comprises 282 villages, 237 gram panchayats, one municipal council, two municipal committees, three sub-divisions, four development blocks and three tehsils. The sub-divisions are under the control of sub-divisional magistrate while each development block is under the control of a block development and panchayat officer. All the blocks are covered under Swarn Jayanti Gram Swarozgar Yojna and other developmental programmes. Developmental programmes are overseen by the additional deputy commissioner-cum chief executive officer, DRDA Palwal. The district is under the overall charge of the deputy commissioner who is also the chairman of the District Rural Development Agency.

=== Villages ===
- Balai, Haryana
- Aurangabad, Haryana
- Bela Palwal
- Gahlab

== Economy ==
Palwal consists of agricultural and commercial areas, and has many temples, schools, colleges and banks. It also contains developed areas like Housing board colony, Kalra colony, New colony, main market, shivapuri, Krishna colony, kailash nagar, shiv colony, camp colony and Huda sector 2. There is a main chowk (English: market) called the Heart of Palwal. The government plans to develop the economy of Palwal in line with nearby cities like Delhi, Gurgaon, Noida, Faridabad, Hodal, Aligarh, and Mathura.

== Transport ==
NH-44 Delhi-Agra national highway and Howrah–New Delhi main line railway pass through Palwal.

== Notable people ==
- Sunil Lanba, 23rd Chief of the Naval Staff of the Indian Navy
- Devi Chitralekha, spiritual speaker
- Sudhir Chaudhary, Journalist at Aaj Tak
- Deepak Mangla, Current MLA of Palwal
- Karan Singh Dalal, Ex. MLA of Palwal and former Minister in the Government of Haryana.

== See also ==
- Administrative divisions of Haryana
- List of cities in Haryana by population
- List of constituencies of the Haryana Legislative Assembly
- List of districts of Haryana
- List of highways in Haryana
- Outline of Haryana
- Railway in Haryana
