= Delhi–Mumbai Expressway =

Indian expressway connecting New Delhi and Mumbai

Delhi–Mumbai Expressway
- National Expressway 4
- Delhi–Mumbai Expressway in red

Route information
- Maintained by National Highways Authority of India (NHAI)
- Length: 1,350 km (840 mi)
- Existed: 12 February 2023 (Sohna–Dausa); 2 October 2023 (Dausa-Sawai Madhopur) (Bhanpura Interchange-Thandla Interchange); February 2024 (Vadodara-Bharuch); 18 December 2024 (Kota-Laban) 11 January 2026 (Bharuch-Kharel) 13 April 2026 (Vadodara-Godhra)–present

Major junctions
- North end: 1. NH 44 in DND-KMP Expressway, Delhi; 2. NH 248A in Sohna Elevated Corridor, Haryana
- List: WPE / NH 148NA in Khalilpur; NH 921 in Pinan; NE 4C in Bandikui; NH 21 in Dausa; NH 148 in Lalsot; NH 23 in Lalsot; NH 552 in Sawai Madhopur; NH 27 in Kota; NH 52 in Kota; NH 752D in Garoth; NH 156 in Namli; NH 927A in Ratlam; NH 47 in Godhra; NE 1 in Vadodara; NH 48 in Vasad; NH 148M in Padra; NH 48 in Kim; NH 53 in Ena
- South end: 1. JNPT, Mumbai MMR, Maharashtra; 2. Virar, Mumbai MMR, Maharashtra

Location
- Country: India
- States: Delhi, Haryana, Rajasthan, Madhya Pradesh, Gujarat and Maharashtra
- Major cities: Delhi, Gurgaon, Faridabad, Ballabgarh, Sohna, Alwar, Bandikui, Dausa, Sawai Madhopur, Kota, Garoth, Mandsaur, Jaora, Ratlam, Thandla, Dahod, Godhra, Vadodara, Bharuch, Surat, Navsari, Valsad, Pardi, Vapi, Palghar, Virar and Mumbai

Highway system
- Roads in India; Expressways; National; State; Asian

The Delhi–Mumbai Expressway (also known as NE 4) is an under construction (partially operational), 1,350-kilometre-long (840 mi), eight-lane-wide (expandable to 12-lane), access-controlled, greenfield expressway connecting India's national capital New Delhi to its financial capital Mumbai, which cuts down the 24 hours Delhi-Mumbai travel time to 12 hours. Delhi–Mumbai Expressway connects the Sohna Elevated Corridor, Gurugram to the Jawaharlal Nehru Port in Navi Mumbai via Dausa, Kota, Ratlam, Vadodara and Surat. It passes through the Union territory of Delhi (12 km) and the states of Haryana (129 km), Rajasthan (373 km), Madhya Pradesh (244 km), Gujarat (426 km) and Maharashtra (171 km). The main length of the expressway from Sohna to Virar is 1,198 km, it's two extensions on either ends, DND–Faridabad–KMP (59 km) and Virar–JNPT (92 km), increase its length to 1,350 km. It also has two greenfield spurs, 32-km long 6-lane Faridabad–Jewar Expressway and 67 km long 4-lane Bandikui–Jaipur Expressway, taking the network length to 1450 km.

== History ==
=== Timeline ===
On 20 March 2018, the contract was awarded by the NHAI for the 24 km-long Package-1 of the Vadodara–Virar section in Gujarat to IRB Infrastructure, and construction work commenced in December 2018. In March 2019, Union Minister Nitin Gadkari laid the foundation stone for the DND–KMP section on 1 March 2019, and the Sohna–Vadodara & Virar–JNPT sections on 8 March 2019.

In October 2021, the NHAI began design work of the 30 km long side spur connecting the Noida International Airport in Jewar, Uttar Pradesh, with Ballabhgarh (Faridabad), Haryana on this expressway.

=== Construction ===
==== Financing and SPV ====
The total project value, including the land acquisition cost, is around ₹1,00,000 crores (~US$13.1 billion). The National Highways Authority of India (NHAI) has formed a wholly owned special-purpose vehicle (SPV), named DME Development Limited (DMEDL), to finance the construction and operation of the Delhi–Mumbai Expressway by diversifying its resource base to develop a sustainable and self-liquidating approach to raise finances. The toll on the projects housed in the SPV is collected by NHAI and the SPV gets the annuity payments without any construction and tolling risks.

==== Construction phases ====
The entire 1,350 km long Delhi–Mumbai Expressway is divided into 4 sections with a total of 52 construction packages/tenders.

Section	Length in km	No. of packages	State-wise packages
DND–Faridabad–KMP	59	03	1 in Delhi and 2 in Haryana
Sohna–KMP–Vadodara	844	31	3 in Haryana, 13 in Rajasthan, 9 in Madhya Pradesh and 6 in Gujarat
Vadodara–Virar	354	13	10 in Gujarat and 3 in Maharashtra
Virar–JNPT	92	05	5 in Maharashtra
Total	1,350	52	06 States

==== List of Packages & Status ====
The NHAI had awarded the construction work in 52 packages to around 20 construction companies. Around 15,000 hectares of land were acquired for this project. Status as of 28 March 2026.

DELHI-VADODARA SECTION

Package Name	Package Length (Km)	Name of Contractor	State	Current Status
1.	18	APCO Infratech	Haryana	Operational
2.	29	APCO Infratech	Haryana	Operational
3.	32	Centrodorstroy India	Haryana	Operational
4.	37	HG Infra	Rajasthan	Operational
5.	36	KCC Buildcon	Rajasthan	Operational
6.	31	KCC Buildcon	Rajasthan	Operational
7.	31	Gawar Constructions	Rajasthan	Operational
8.	33	HG Infra	Rajasthan	Operational
9.	46	HG Infra	Rajasthan	Operational
10.	26	Dhaya Maju Infra - Crescent EPC Projects	Rajasthan	98%
11.	12	Larsen & Toubro	Rajasthan	100%
12.	28	GR Infra	Rajasthan	Operational
13.	29	CDS Infra Projects	Rajasthan	Operational
14.	31	Dhaya Maju Infra - Crescent EPC Projects	Rajasthan	Operational
15.	8	Dilip Buildcon - Altis Holding Corp	Rajasthan	88%
16.	25	DRA Infracon	Rajasthan	Operational
17.	32	JiangXi Construction - MKC Infra	Madhya Pradesh	Operational
18.	33	GR Infra	Madhya Pradesh	Operational
19.	30	JiangXi Construction - MKC Infra	Madhya Pradesh	Operational
20.	25	GHV India	Madhya Pradesh	Operational
21.	30	GR Infra	Madhya Pradesh	Operational
22.	25	Larsen & Toubro	Madhya Pradesh	Operational
23.	25	GR Infra	Madhya Pradesh	Operational
24.	21	GR Infra	Madhya Pradesh	Operational
25.	23	GR Infra	Madhya Pradesh	Operational
26.	30	Atlas Construction - NKC	Gujarat	95%
27.	29	GHV India	Gujarat	100%
28.	26	GHV India	Gujarat	100%
29.	23	PNC Infratech	Gujarat	100%
30.	22	Patel Infrastructure	Gujarat	100%
31.	19	PNC Infratech	Gujarat	100%

VADODARA-VIRAR-JNPT Spur SECTIONS

Package Name	Package Length (Km)	Name of Contractor	State	Current Status
1.	24	IRB Infra	Gujarat	Operational
2.	32	IRCON	Gujarat	Operational
3.	31	Patel Infrastructure	Gujarat	Operational
4.	13	Ashoka Buildcon	Gujarat	Operational
5.	25	Sadbhav Engineering-Gawar Construction	Gujarat	Operational
6.	37	GR Infra	Gujarat	Operational
7.	28	IRB Infra	Gujarat	Operational
8.	35	Roadways Solutions India	Gujarat	5%
9.	27	Roadways Solutions India	Gujarat	10%
10.	25	Roadways Solutions India	Gujarat	43%
11.	26	RKC Infrabuild	Maharashtra	100%
12.	26	Montecarlo	Maharashtra	95%
13.	24	GR Infra	Maharashtra	92%
14.	17	IRCON	Maharashtra	88%
15.	23	Agroh Infrastructure	Maharashtra	95%
16.	27	Shivalaya Construction	Maharashtra	87%
17.	10	IRCON	Maharashtra	93%
18.	18	Merged with MSRDC Corridor	Maharashtra	

DND-Faridabad-KMP Spur SECTIONS

Package Name	Package Length (Km)	Name of Contractor	State	Current Status
1.	9	DRA Infracon	Haryana	98%
2.	25	DRA Infracon	Haryana	Operational
3.	26	DRA Infracon	Haryana	Operational
Jewar Spur	31	APCO Infratech	Haryana/Uttar Pradesh	64%

== Route alignment ==
At the Delhi end, the Delhi–Mumbai Expressway has two main entry/exit points: DND Flyway, Maharani Bagh in Delhi and Alipur village, north of Sohna in Haryana. Traffic coming from both ends and moving towards Vadodara / Mumbai will merge at the double trumpet interchange with KMP Expressway at Khalilpur village (Nuh district) of Haryana. The greenfield alignment is as follows:

=== Section 1: DND–Faridabad–KMP ===
==== NCT of Delhi (12 km) ====
- Begins in Delhi from the junction of DND Flyway and Ring Road at Maharani Bagh
- Pass through Khizrabad, Batla House and Shaheen Bagh on Yamuna river's west bank
- Starts moving exactly along the Agra Canal from Okhla Vihar metro station to Mithapur
- 2nd entry ramp near Kalindi Kunj metro station (from Noida towards Mithapur)
- Exits Delhi near MCD Toll, Mithapur Chowk.

==== Haryana-I (47 km) ====
- On Kalindi Kunj–Mithapur road, it will cross the Agra Canal at Sehatpur Bridge (Faridabad)
- Move on Faridabad bypass road from Sector-37, Faridabad to Kail Gaon, Ballabhgarh
- Interchange with Delhi–Agra (NH-2) near DPS Ballabhgarh school at Kail Gaon village
- Crosses Palwal–Sohna (NH-919) at Hajipur village (Gurgaon district)
- Toll Plaza at Kiranj (for Toll rates) (Nuh district). It is 56 km from the DND starting point.
- Trumpet interchange with KMP Expressway at Khalilpur (for Toll rates), (Nuh district).

=== Section 2: Sohna–KMP–Vadodara ===
==== Haryana-II (79 km) ====
- Sohna–Gurgaon road: Begins at Alipur village (Gurgaon district)
- NH-919 (Sohna–Palwal) interchange at Sancholi village (Gurgaon).
- Toll Plaza is at Hilalpur (Toll Rates) village near Bhirawati (Nuh district)

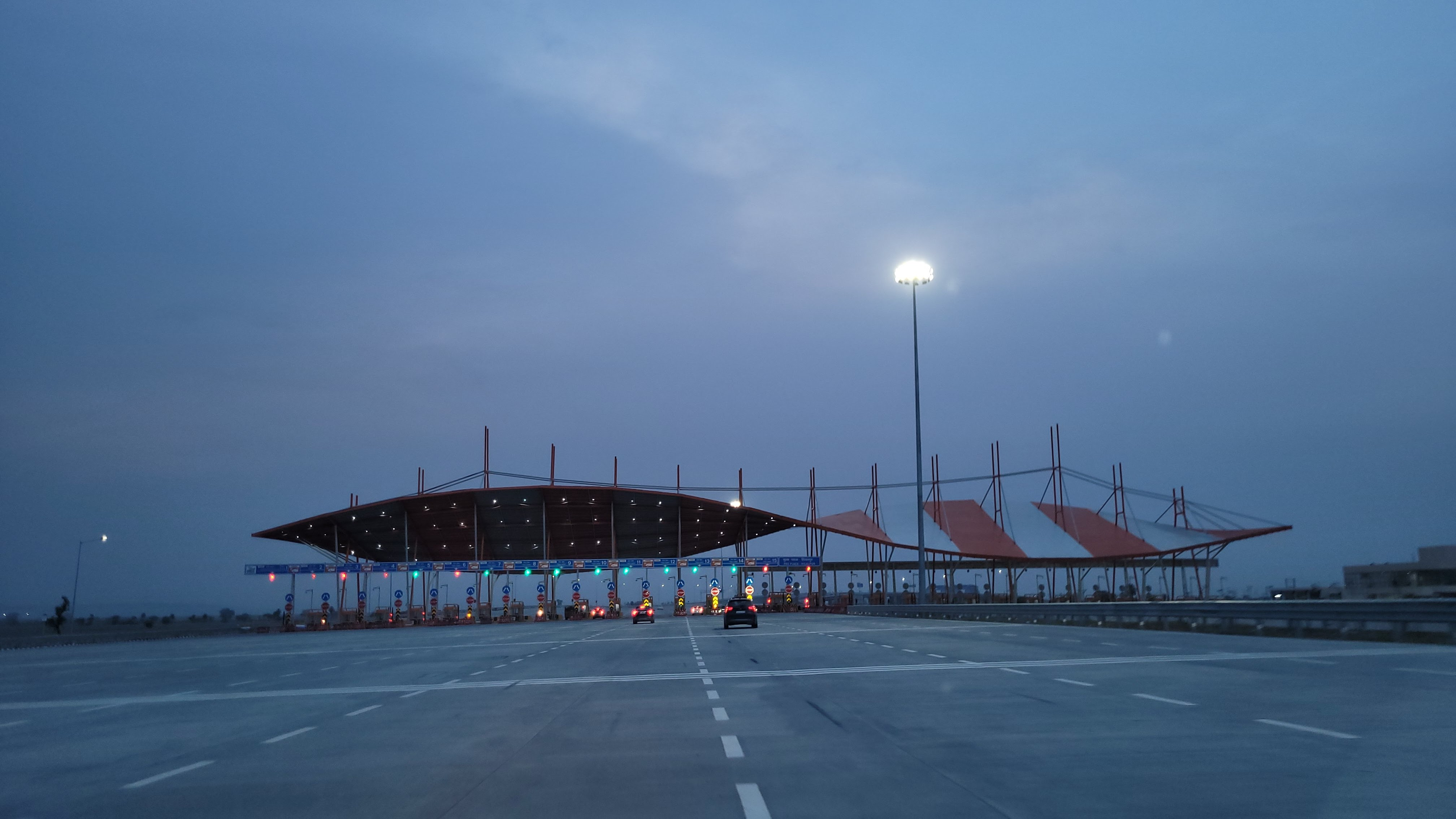
Hilalpur Toll Plaza

- Trumpet interchange with KMP Expressway at Khalilpur village in Nuh district. Traffic coming from Maharani Bagh in Delhi by 59 km long DND–Faridabad–KMP section will also merge here.
- Naurangabad village (Palwal district).
- SH-132 (Nuh–Hodal) interchange, east of Ujina
- Khanpur Ghati village (west of Pinangwan)
- Ferozepur Jhirka interchange at Ghata Shamasabad village (Nuh district).
- Exits Haryana from Kolgaon village (Nuh district).

==== Rajasthan (373 km) ====
- Enters Rajasthan at Munpur Karmala village (Alwar district)
- SH-45, Sirmaur village (Alwar district)
- SH-14 Alwar interchange at Seetal village, near Baroda Meo (Alwar district)
- SH-44, Chhila Chhoh village near Laxmangarh (Alwar district)
- NH-921 interchange at Pinan village (Alwar district) for Rajgarh and Mandawar
- Peechupara Khurd village near Bandikui
- NH-21 Dausa interchange at Bhandarej village (east of Dausa)
- NH-148, Lalsot interchange at Dungarpur village (Dausa district)
- NH-23 Lalsot interchange at Chimanpura (Dausa)
- East of Bonli (SAWAIMADHOPUR district)
- NH-552 Sawai Madhopur interchange at Jaisapura (Sawai Madhopur)
- SH-29 interchange, east of Indragarh (Bundi)
- East of Lakheri (Bundi district)
- SH-70, Sultanpur village (Kota district)
- NH-27 Kota interchange at Karariya village (Kota)
- NH-52 Kota interchange at Mandana village
- SH-9A Rawatbhata interchange at Chechat
- Exits Rajasthan at Moondiya village (Kota district)

==== Madhya Pradesh (244 km) ====
- Enters Madhya Pradesh at Dhabla Madhosingh village (Mandsaur district)
- SH-31A Neemuch / Jhalawar interchange, east of Bhanpura
- Garoth interchange at south of Garoth (Mandsaur district)
- Crosses Chambal River near Amli village (Mandsaur)
- SH-14 Mandsaur interchange at Dalawada village (east of Sitamau)
- SH-17 Jaora interchange at Bhuteda village (Ratlam district)
- Namli interchange at Nayapura village (Ratlam district)
- NH-927A Ratlam / Sailana interchange at Dhamnod village (north-west of Ratlam)
- SH-39 Thandla interchange at Manpur village (Jhabua)
- Crosses Anas river at Dhebar village (Jhabua)

==== Gujarat-I (149 km) ====
- enters Gujarat at Chhayan village (Dahod district)
- NH-56 interchange, north of Dahod
- NH-47 interchange, north of Godhra
- NE-1 Ahmedabad interchange at Dodka village (Vadodara district)

=== Section 3: Vadodara–Virar ===
==== Gujarat-II (277 km) ====
- NE-1 Ahmedabad interchange at Dodka village (Vadodara district)
- NH-48/ NH-64 Ahmedabad interchange at Fajalpur village (near Nandesari), north-west of Vadodara
- Vadodara-Padra road interchange between Samiyala and Laxmipura village, west of Vadodara
- Crosses Narmada River via Narmada Bridge, India's Longest Extradosed Cable Stayed Bridge
- SH-6 Dahej interchange at Dehgam village, west of Bharuch
- NH-48 interchange at Moti Naroli village, east of Kim (Surat district)
- NH-53 Surat interchange at Ena-Nani Dhamdod between Palsana and Bardoli
- east of Navsari
- east of Valsad, exit Gujarat and enters Maharashtra.

==== Maharashtra-I (79 km) ====
- Gujarat-Maharashtra border
- Virar (Palghar district)

=== Section 4: Virar–JNPT ===
==== Maharashtra-II (92 km) ====
This section forms eastern semi-circle around Mumbai.

- Virar (Palghar district),
- Vajreshwari (Thane district), from north of Virar turn eastward till Vajreshwari and then turn southward to Amne
- Amane (Thane district)
- Badlapur (Thane district), from here turn westward toward JNPT
- JNPT (Raigad District)

=== Side spurs ===
The expressway will have multiple side spurs in the future, which will help commuters to connect with other major cities which are not directly connected on the main route.

==== Faridabad–Jewar spur ====
- Faridabad–Jewar Expressway: 32-km long, 6 lane, greenfield side spur connecting Sector-65 of Faridabad bypass in Haryana with Noida International Airport in Jewar. In July 2022, the NHAI awarded the construction work.

==== Bandikui-Jaipur spur ====
- Bandikui–Jaipur Expressway: 67 km long, 4-lane, greenfield spur from Bandikui to Jaipur. Signed as NE 4C.

== Special features ==
The various special features of the Delhi–Mumbai Expressway are as follows.

=== Expandable to 12 lanes ===
Land for an additional four lanes is reserved in the middle of the road for future expansion from 8 lanes to 12 lanes, along with the space for utilities, plantation and public transport on both sides. This expressway, along with Western Dedicated Freight Corridor (Western DFC) is a vital backbone of the Delhi-Mumbai Industrial Corridor.

=== Wayside Amenities ===
The expressway will have Wayside Amenities at 93 places having facilities like ATM, hotels, retail shops, food courts, charging stations for electric vehicles and fuel stations. It will also be the first expressway in India to have helipads and fully equipped trauma centers at every 100 km for accident victims. Although this is planned, actual implementation and building of wayside amenities has been very slow, and it is usually advised to stock up on food, water and fuel before entering the motorway.

=== Electric highway ===
On 25 March 2021, Union Minister Nitin Gadkari said in Lok Sabha that there is a plan to develop a stretch of this expressway as an e-highway (electric highway) where trucks and buses can run at a speed of 120 km/hour, which will bring down the logistics cost by 70% as heavy vehicles will run on electricity instead of diesel. National Highways Authority of India (NHAI) has started the construction of this project, and is expected to be completed by March 2022. It will also have 4 dedicated lanes for electric vehicles in the entire expressway, out of 8 lanes.

=== Environment friendly ===
It is being developed as an environment-friendly expressway with a tree cover of 20 lakh trees, watered with drip irrigation along the entire stretch with a rainwater harvesting system at every 500 metres. Expressway will be lit using a mix of power supply from state grids and Solar energy.

=== Wildlife crossings ===
A combined length of 2.5 km of this 8-lane wide expressway will have run under 5 natural-looking wildlife crossings on the stretches identified as the known wildlife corridors between tiger reserves. One of these crossings will be a tunnel in Mukundara Hills National Park, which will be the country's second 8-lane wide tunnel, after Samruddhi Mahamarg. This will be the second expressway in India to have wildlife crossings, after Samruddhi Mahamarg. The crossing over the expressway will have 8 meters tall noise barrier walls on either side, and the uncovered stretch of expressway passing through the wildlife corridor will have 6-foot tall walls on both sides of the expressway to prevent animals and pedestrians from entering to minimize the impact of traffic zipping past at speeds up to 120 km/hour. This expressway runs through Aravalli Wildlife corridors especially affecting corridors in four Tiger Reserves of Rajasthan, namely Sariska Tiger Reserve, Mukundara Hills National Park, Ranthambore National Park and Ramgarh Vishdhari Wildlife Sanctuary, all of which are important Tiger reserves of India. There is overcrowding at Ranthambore, and tigers have migrated to other sanctuaries and reserves via the Aravalli wildlife corridor, for example, at least 3 tigers have migrated out of Ranthambore to Ramgarh since 2013.

Wildlife experts have expressed concerns as there are not sufficient wildlife crossings on this very wide 8-lane expressway, especially between Sariska and Ranthambore reserves as well as Sariska reserve and leopard habitat forests of Delhi-Gurugram-Faridabad-Nuh in Delhi NCR. This area is also a part of the leopard corridor of NCR. Additional wildlife crossings are needed at several locations, such as on the alignment near Faridabad (alignment near Nimot-Kot-Dhouj forested hills), hills east of Bhadas (hill from Devla Nagli to Rithat to Khanpur Ghati), hills near Firozpur Jhirka (crossings near Kheri Kalan, Regarh, Bhakro Ji, Bas Burja), Naugaon, Dohli, near Alwar and Sariska (Ghata-Chirawanda-Kalakha), Nangal Todiyal, Bandikui, Dausa, Chhateda, etc.

== Inter-connectivity ==
=== Delhi–Haryana-UP NCR ===
The Delhi–Mumbai Expressway will be directly connected with various other expressways like the Delhi–Noida Direct Flyway (DND Flyway) in Delhi, Western Peripheral Expressway (which will connect it to the Delhi–Katra Expressway) in Haryana, Eastern Peripheral Expressway (which will connect it to the Delhi–Dehradun Expressway in Haryana.

=== Haryana-Rajasthan ===
Paniyala (between Narnaul-Kotputli)-Alwar-Barodameo 86.5 km long 6-lane access-controlled National Highway, will also connect Delhi–Mumbai Expressway to the Trans-Haryana Expressway via the NH-148B. Paniyala-Alwar-Barodameo Highway (Barodameo interchange on Delhi–Mumbai Expressway), 86 km 6-lane highway costing ₹2876.42 crore including land acquisition, with 23 10m wide and 3m high wildlife underpasses for leopards and tigers of Sariska Tiger Reserve and 46 vehicle underpasses, started construction in March 2024 which by February 2025 was 15% complete and had already acquired 60 km of required total 86 km land, has target completion date of 2026.

NH-248A Nuh-Alwar National Highway, is being upgraded from single-lane to 3-lane highway with paved shoulder, with construction starting from September 2025 and 24 months expected completion by September 2027.

=== Rajasthan-UP ===
Alwar-Agra Expressway (Barodameo-Agra spur from Delhi–Mumbai Expressway), proposed mix of greenfield and brownfield upgrade, commenced DPR preparation in 2025 which proposed 3 route options including via Bharatpur to Agra where it will connect to Agra-Gwalior Expressway.

NH-530B Deeg-Govardhan-Govardhan-Mathura was upgraded in 2025 to 4-lane highway with paved shoulders as part of wider Deeg-Govardhan-Mathura-Bareilly national highway.

=== Rajasthan–MP–Maharashtra–Telangana ===
"NH-148NG Kota–Indore Expressway" (190 km 6-lane access-controlled highspeed highway upgrade) will connect it to Hyderabad–Indore Expressway (via Nanded-Akola-Omkareshwar-Indore), which will intersect Mumbai–Nagpur Expressway at Akola.

=== Gujarat ===
It will connect to Ahmedabad–Vadodara Expressway and at Ahmedabad it will connect to Ahmedabad–Dholera Expressway. At Surat, it will connect to Surat–Chennai Expressway.

=== Maharashtra ===
It will be connected with Mumbai–Nagpur Expressway (near Amne, northeast of Mumbai), Mumbai–Pune Expressway (near Navi Mumbai International Airport at Vichumbe, southeast of Mumbai) and NH-66 Mumbai-Goa Expressway (near Vichumbe, southeast of Mumbai).

== Timeline ==
- Mar 2018: Contract awarded by the NHAI on 20 March for 24 km-long Package-1 of the Vadodara–Virar section in Gujarat to IRB Infrastructure.
- Dec 2018: Construction work started on the Narmada River by Ashoka Buildcon on 10 December. It is part of Package-4 of the Vadodara–Virar section.
- Jan 2019: Land acquisition work is at last stage in Haryana. Construction work starts for Package-1 and 2 of the Vadodara–Virar section, while work on the Sohna–Vadodara section will start soon.
- Mar 2019: Foundation stone laid by Union Minister Nitin Gadkari for the DND–KMP section on 1 March 2019 and the Sohna–Vadodara & Virar–JNPT sections on 8 March 2019. Construction work awarded for 148 km, 400 km of work to be awarded in a month and the rest 800 km of work to be awarded in the next 6 months. The ₹90,000 crores expressway will take about 3 years to complete.
- Sep 2019: Construction work on the Sohna–Vadodara section starts on 5 September for Package-3 and on 13 September for Package-1 & 2. All 3 packages are in Haryana (Sohna to Kolgaon).
- Jun 2020: 497 km under construction, 162 km of work awarded, 569 km under the bidding process. Detailed Project Report (DPR) to be prepared for 92 km long Virar–JNPT (Virar–Mumbai).
- Aug 2020: Contracts awarded for all 3 packages of 59 km long DND–Faridabad–KMP section to DRA Infracon. It will pass through DND Flyway, Faridabad, Ballabhgarh and KMP Expressway.
- Oct 2020: Soil testing work started in Faridabad on DND–Faridabad–KMP section. Contracts awarded in Maharashtra for Packages 11, 12 & 13 of Vadodara–Virar section on 15 October 2020.
- Apr 2021: 710 km under-construction. Work awarded by NHAI for 41 out of 52 construction packages (1,110 km out of 1,350 km).
- July 2021: 350 km has been constructed, 825 km is under-construction and Tenders for the remaining 7 out of 52 packages to be awarded before March 2022: Nitin Gadkari said in Rajya Sabha.
- Aug 2021: A link road will be constructed which will connect Sector-65, Faridabad in Haryana on this expressway to the upcoming Noida International Airport in Jewar, Uttar Pradesh.
- Sep 2021: The construction work of the steel bridge over Narmada river near Bharuch in Gujarat has been completed in a record time of 32 months: Union Minister Nitin Gadkari.
- Oct 2021: NHAI begins design work of the 30 km long side spur connecting Noida International Airport in Jewar, Uttar Pradesh with Ballabhgarh (Faridabad), Haryana on this expressway.
- Mar 2022: Segment Launcher started erection of concrete structures in Delhi on 21 March. It is a part of DND–Faridabad–KMP section (Package-1) in which 7 km out of 9 km will be elevated.
- Mar 2022: GR Infraprojects Ltd emerges as the lowest bidder to construct and operate the 67 km long Bandikui–Jaipur spur section.
- July 2022: Tender for Faridabad bypass to Jewar Airport (Spur package) has been awarded by the NHAI to Apco Infratech Pvt. Ltd. on 29 July.
- Dec 2022: 1063 km under-construction out of 1386 km; 7 packages (202 km) out of 53 (1386 km) completed as of 30 December 2022.
- Feb 2023: Prime Minister Narendra Modi inaugurated the 246-km long Sohna–Dausa–Lalsot stretch of the expressway on 12 February 2023.
- September 2023: 244 km Madhya Pradesh section was opened on 20 September 2023.
- February 2024: The Vadodara to Bharuch section of Delhi-Mumbai expressway was inaugurated on 22 February 2024.
- July 2024: Per National Authority of India (NHAI), more than 80% of the work has been completed. This includes 96% completion of Delhi to Vadodara sector stretching 845 km.
- November 2024: A 24 km stretch was opened to public between Mithapur (Jaitpur Pushta) on the Delhi border and Kelly village in Ballabhgarh, Haryana.
- December 2024: An 80 km stretch of road was open to public between Gopalpura (Kota) and Laban (Bundi) in Rajasthan.
- April 2025: A total stretch of 756 km of Delhi–Mumbai Expressway has been made open to public.

- June 2026: A 63.5 km stretch was opened to public between Kim to Enna .

== Current status ==
- Main route:
  - Aug 2025: The entire Delhi-Vadodara stretch is expected to be completed by December 2026, with Vadodara-Mumbai section to be fully operational in 2027–28.
  - June 2026: Package VI and VII stated Kim to Enna is operational, Now Enna to Godhra stretch Operational ( Vadodara - Godhra Open for trail ) Godhra - Dahod is under construction with expected completion date by the end of 2026.

- Spurs:
  - Aug 2025: Bandikui-Jaipur Expressway spur is operational, Faridabad–Jewar Expressway spur is under construction with expected completion date by the end of 2026.

== See also ==
- Expressways of India
- National Highways Development Project
- Delhi–Amritsar–Katra Expressway
- Delhi–Jaipur Expressway
- Eastern Peripheral Expressway
- Western Peripheral Expressway
- Yamuna Expressway
- Mumbai–Nagpur Expressway
