= Beheading of Bhausaheb Maruti Talekar =

Militant attack in Kashmir, February 2000

The beheading of Bhausaheb Maruti Talekar by a group of Pakistani militants led by Ilyas Kashmiri of Harkat-ul-Jihad al-Islami occurred in the Rajouri district of Jammu and Kashmir on 27 February 2000.

Talekar was an Indian army personnel on guard duty at the Ashok Listening Post.

All seven soldiers on duty from the 17 Maratha Light Infantry battalion were killed by the militants. Talekar was beheaded, and his head was carried across the Line of Control to Pakistan.

== Early years ==
Talekar was a resident of Kolgaon village in Ahmednagar district, Maharashtra, India. He was the son of daily laborers and had studied till the tenth grade before joining the army. He was unmarried and 24 years old at the time of his killing. According to natives of his village, his family did not know that he was beheaded. The army declined Talekar's sister's request to see his face. His last rites were performed at his village.

== Attack ==
In the early hours of 27 February 2000, the Ashok Listening Post, an Indian army guard post, situated on the Line of control came under ambush attack, led by Ilyas Kashmiri and twenty-five HuJI militants.

The Ashok Listening Post was located near the village of Jhangar in Nowshehra sector in the Rajouri district of Jammu and Kashmir, India. The attack was covered by heavy mortar and rocket barrage from Pakistan army positions, which were dressed in black uniform and reported to be from Special Services Group.

The Indian post was surrounded on all three sides by the Pakistani posts and was said to be an unfavorable position.

Bhausaheb Maruti Talekar was on guard duty, and other seven soldiers of the 17 Maratha Light Infantry were in the post at the time of attack. Ilyas Kashmiri slit Talekar's throat and thereafter the other militants accompanying him opened fire inside the bunker in which all seven army men were killed.

The head of Talekar was taken across the Line of Control in Pakistan by the militants and was brandished as a trophy before the public, who cheered. According to Indian Army, Talekar was the first casualty of the attack. A captured militant revealed that they had played football with the head of Talekar.

Pakistan denied that its soldiers were involved in the incident.

== Aftermath ==
The President of Pakistan Gen. Pervez Musharraf honored Ilyas Kashmiri in a ceremony and rewarded him with one-lakh Pakistani rupees, in cash for bringing the head of an Indian army personnel.

Ilyas Kashmiri, was killed in an alleged US drone attack in 2011.

=== The inquiry against the commanding officer ===
The commanding officer of the unit was Colonel Sandes. He had communicated to the superiors seeking permission to shift the Ashok listening post because of the possibility of a sneaking attack such as the one which happened on 27 February 2000, but he was denied permission. He faced a court of inquiry after the incident which exonerated him, but his superiors had reported that Colonel Sandes was unfit for commanding a unit. The colonel had to fight a legal battle to be eligible for promotion. Sandes was promoted to the rank of Brigadier in 2010.

=== Talekar's memory ===
The army took up the responsibility of the education of his sister after the incident. His family continues to receive a pension of ₹10,000 per month. A sum of ₹12 lakh was given to Talekar's family as compensation.

In his memory, a community hall was built in his village. His sister is pursuing the hope to start a school for special children in his memory.

=== Similar incidents ===
During the Kargil War, Captain Saurabh Kalia of the Indian Army was captured by the Pakistani soldiers and later his dead body was handed back. Indian security officials allege that Saurabh Kalia's dead body was badly mutilated when they received it. In one decade before 2013, when Lance Naik Hemraj was beheaded, there have been at least three other such instances of decapitation of Indian soldiers by the Pakistani troops.

According to Indian newspaper, The Hindu, cross-border raids had almost ceased after 2003. However, they resumed again in 2007 and 2008. In 2017, India alleged that two of its soldiers were beheaded by Pakistani Border Action Team (BAT). According to Indian officials, the Border Action Team had crossed 250 metres (820 ft) deep into Indian territory to ambush Indian Army patrol party.

== See also ==
- Saurabh Kalia
- List of punitive expeditions across the LOC
