= Bhirawati =

- Location in Haryana, India Bhirawati (India)
- Country: India
- State: Haryana
- District: Nuh
- Elevation: 187 m (614 ft)

Population (2011)
  - Total: 1,424

Languages
  - Official: Hindi
- Time zone: UTC+5:30 (IST)
- PIN: 122103 Vehicle registration plate = HR-93
- ISO 3166 code: IN-HR
- Website: mewat.gov.in

Bhirawati is a village in Ferozepur Jhirka sub-division of Nuh district of Haryana state of India. It lies in the Mewat region of Delhi NCR and Delhi–Mumbai Industrial Corridor. It lies 10 km east of Sohna adjacent to the NH 919 and Delhi–Mumbai Expressway.

== Demography ==
It had a population of 1,424 as per 2011 census of India.

== Administration ==
The village local governance is managed by the elected panchayat headed by the Sarpanch.

== See also ==
- Bhiwadi
- Bhadas
- Gurgaon
- Moolthan
