= Kolgaon =

Kolgaon may refer to the following places:

- Kolgaon, Haryana, a village
- Kolgaon, Maharashtra, a village
