= Highways and expressways in Delhi =

Highways in Delhi, India

Delhi, a major metropolitan region of India, is connected to various parts of country through several national highways and expressways. All the highways and expressways from Delhi lead to Haryana or Uttar Pradesh and continue from there.

Delhi is directly connected to the state of Haryana by the Delhi–Gurgaon Expressway (part of National Highway 48) to the city of Gurgaon, National Highway 44 to the city of Sonipat, Delhi–Faridabad Skyway (part of National Highway 44) to the city of Faridabad, and National Highway 9 to the city of Bahadurgarh.

Delhi is directly connected to the state of Uttar Pradesh by the DND Flyway to the city of Noida and Delhi–Meerut Expressway (part of National Highway 9) to the city of Ghaziabad.

== Expressways ==
=== Operational ===
==== Delhi–Gurgaon Expressway ====
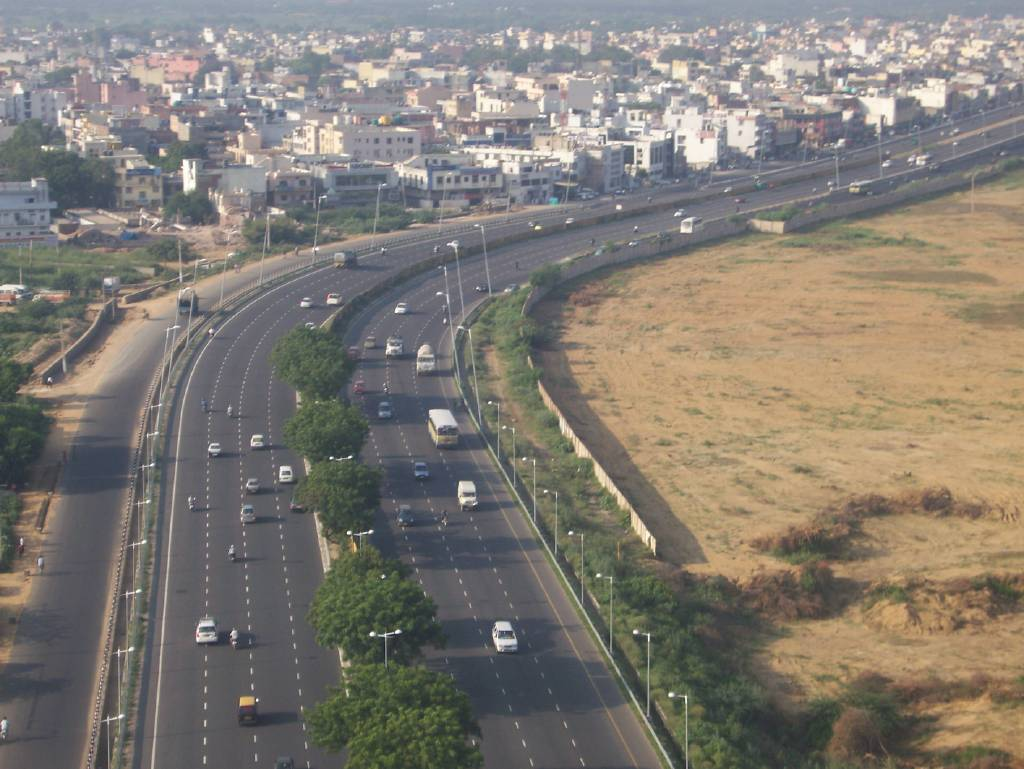
A view of Delhi-Gurgaon stretch of National Highway - 48 (NH48). The 8-lane expressway connects Delhi to Gurgaon and Indira Gandhi International Airport.

Delhi–Gurgaon Expressway is a 28 km long access-controlled toll expressway connecting Delhi, the national capital of India, and Gurgaon on NH48. The highway runs from Delhi to Mumbai wherein the Delhi-Gurgaon Expressway runs till outskirts of Gurgaon. The expressway is a part of Golden Quadrilateral project, which itself is a part of ambitious National Highway Development Project and emphasizes improving road connectivity between four metropolitan cities of India, namely Delhi, Mumbai, Chennai and Kolkata by developing 4–6 lane highways between them.

The much-delayed Rs.10 billion, 27.7 km expressway opened 23 January 2008. It has helped reduce the travel time for hundreds of thousands of commuters and international air passengers. Vehicle users have to pay a toll for using the expressway, which is collected at three points, near the Indira Gandhi International Airport, the Delhi-Gurgaon Border and the 42nd milestone. Since it began operation, it has also achieved notoriety for a large number of accidents involving pedestrians. There are only two over-bridges along the entire stretch to cater to the communities living on either side of heavily populated areas through which the expressway runs. The toll plaza at the Delhi-Gurgaon border has also proved inadequate to handle the increasing traffic, leading to traffic jams during peak hours. Though the plaza is tag enabled, only 40 percent of the traffic that passes through avails of this facility.

==== Delhi–Noida Direct Flyway (DND Flyway) ====
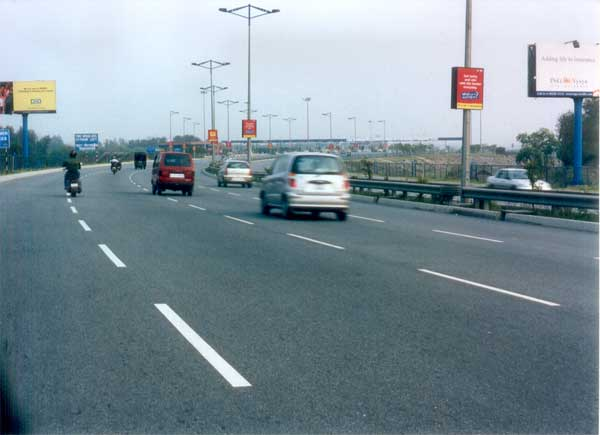
The DND Flyway

Delhi–Noida Direct Flyway or DND Flyway is an 8-lane access controlled tolled expressway which connects Delhi to Noida, an industrial suburb area. It was built and is maintained by The Noida Toll Bridge Company Ltd. The project, built by the Noida Toll Bridge Company Ltd. was developed under a Build-Own-Operate-Transfer model. The Noida Toll Bridge Company promoted by the Infrastructure Leasing and Financial Services (IL&FS). The project included the construction of a flyover at Ashram Chowk and the construction of a 552.5 meter bridge over the Yamuna river.

==== Delhi–Faridabad Skyway ====
The NH 44 or Delhi–Faridabad skyway is a flyover that connects Badarpur in Delhi to Sector-37 in Faridabad on Mathura Road (old NH-2). The toll plaza (border) through which thousands of passengers go to their destinations is called Badarpur border because the nearest area of Delhi which is near to the toll plaza is Badarpur. The Toll is collected by South MCD of Delhi.

==== Delhi–Meerut Expressway ====
Delhi–Meerut Expressway or National Expressway 3 is India's widest 96 km long controlled-access expressway, connecting Delhi with Meerut via Dasna in Ghaziabad in India.

=== Under Construction ===
==== Delhi–Mumbai Expressway ====
Delhi–Mumbai Expressway is a 1,350 km long 8-lane wide expressway connecting DND Flyway in Delhi with JLN Port in Mumbai. It is expected to be completed by March 2023.

==== Dwarka Expressway ====
Dwarka Expressway is a 27.6 km long, 8-lane wide expressway connecting Mahipalpur in Delhi to Gurgaon in Haryana.

== National Highways ==
=== National Highway 1 ===
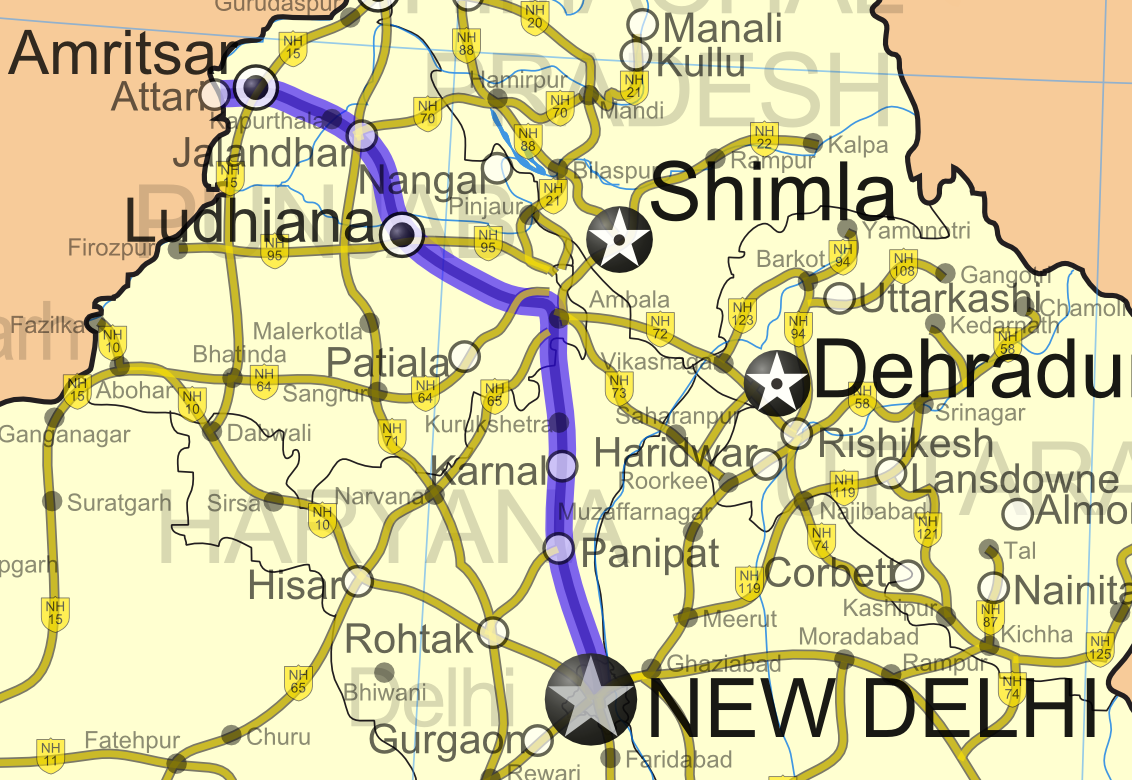
Road ma of India with National Highway 1 highlighted in solid blue color

National Highway 1

National Highway 1 or (NH 1) is a National Highway in Northern India that links the National capital New Delhi to the town of Attari in Punjab near the Indo-Pakistani border. The highway is maintained by National Highways Authority of India. The highway originally started from Lahore in Pakistan. This is one of the longest and oldest highways of India.

The present day NH 1 passes through Amritsar, Jalandhar, Ludhiana, Ambala, Kurukshetra, Karnal, Panipat, Sonipat and Delhi. It runs for a distance of 456 km. The Delhi–Lahore Bus travels on NH 1 in India. NH 1 presently has 4 different spur routes designated as 1A, 1B, 1C and 1D. Approximately 380 km stretch of NH 1 from Jalandhar to Delhi is a part of the North-South Corridor.

=== National Highway 2 ===
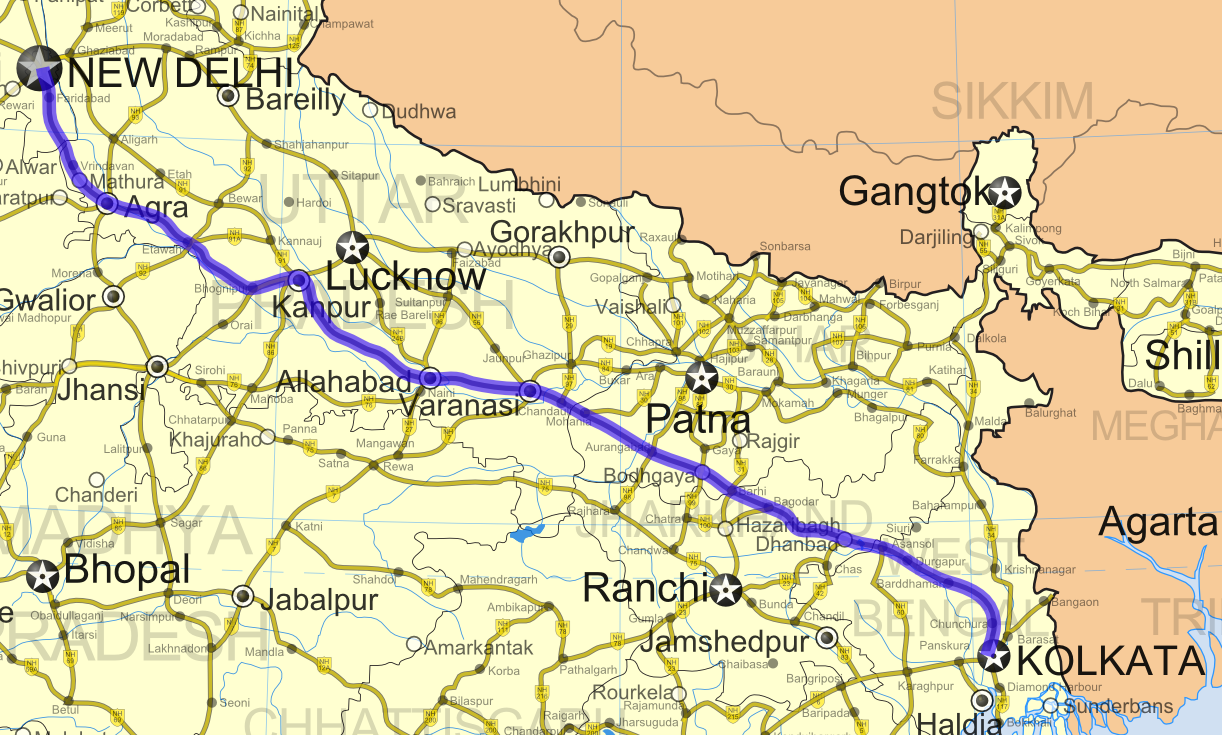
Road map of Iia with National Highway 2 highlighted in solid blue color

National Highway 2

National Highway 2 (NH 2), commonly referred as Delhi-Kolkata Road is a busy Indian National Highway that runs through the states of Delhi, Haryana, Uttar Pradesh, Bihar, Jharkhand, and West Bengal. It constitute a major portion of historical Grand Trunk Road along with NH 91 and NH 1 in India. The road is the part of National Highway network of India, and it is officially listed as running over 1465 km from Delhi to (Dankuni) Kolkata. The km in each of the states are Delhi (12), Haryana (74), Uttar Pradesh (752), Bihar (202), Jharkhand (190), West Bengal (235).

The highway touches the cities of Faridabad & Palwal in Haryana, Mathura, Agra, Etawah, Kanpur, Allahabad, Varanasi in Uttar Pradesh, Mohania & Sasaram in Bihar, Barhi, Dhanbad in Jharkhand and Asansol, Durgapur, Kolkata in West Bengal.

Almost all of the 1465 km stretch of NH 2 has been selected as a part of the Golden Quadrilateral by the National Highways Development Project. Approximately 253 km stretch of NH 2 between Delhi and Agra has been selected as a part of the North-South Corridor by the National Highways Development Project. Approximately 35 km stretch of NH 2 between Barah and Kanpur has been selected as a part of the East-West Corridor by the National Highways Development Project.

=== National Highway 8 ===
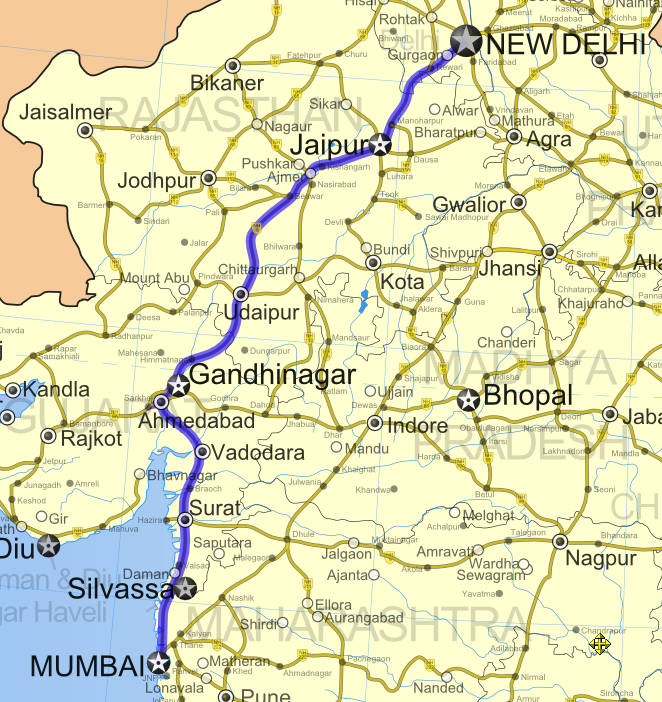
Road map of India with National Highway 8 ignited in solid blue color

National Highway 8

National Highway 8 (NH 8), is a National Highway in India that connects the Indian capital city of New Delhi with the Indian Financial capital city of Mumbai. The highway passes through the State capitals of Gandhinagar and Jaipur, as well as important cities like Ahmedabad, Surat and Vadodara.

This highway is part of the Golden Quadrilateral project undertaken by National Highways Authority of India and was the first part to be completed. The Delhi-Gurgaon Expressway is a part of NH 8. Before entering downtown Mumbai, NH 8 passes through nearly all suburbs on the Western line of Mumbai Suburban Railway, where it is popularly known as Western Express Highway.

=== National Highway 10 ===
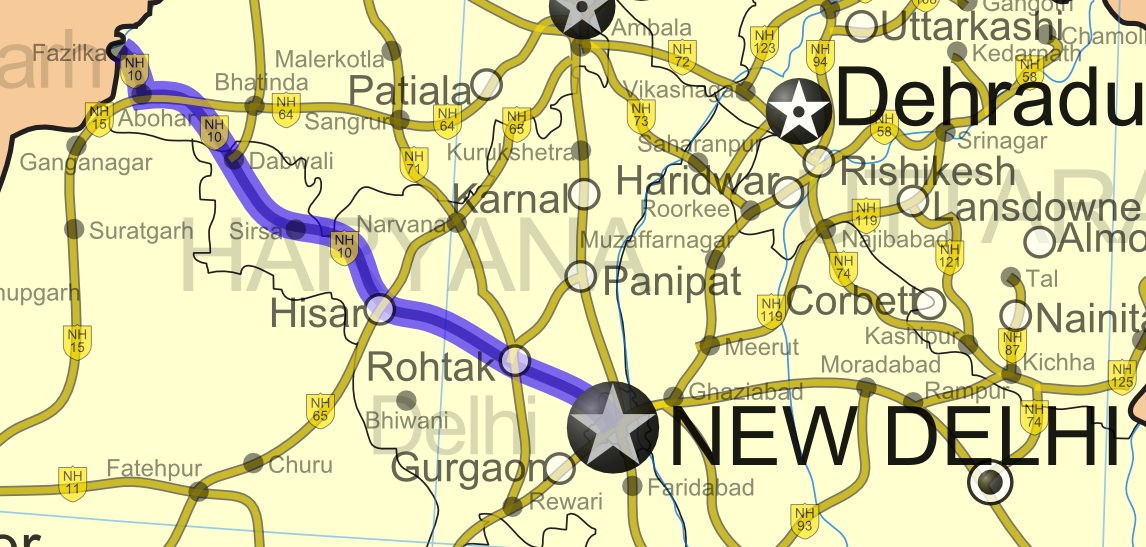
Road map of India with Nanal Highway 10 highlighted in solid blue color

National Highway 10

National Highway 10 (NH 10) is a National Highway in northern India that originates at Delhi and ends at the town of Fazilka in Punjab near the Indo-Pakistani border.

=== National Highway 24 ===
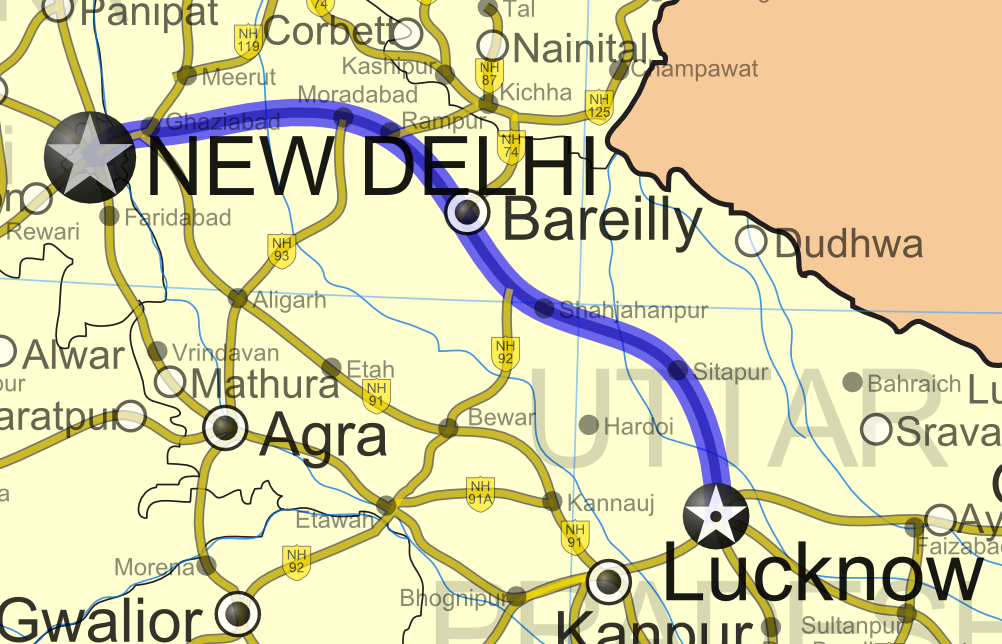
Road map of India with National Highway 24 highlighted in solid blue color

National Highway 24

National Highway 24 or NH 24 is a National Highway in India that connects the National capital Delhi to Uttar Pradesh state capital Lucknow running 438 kilometers in length.

== See also ==
- National highways of India
  - List of national highways in India
- National Highways Authority of India
- National Highways Development Project
- Transport in Delhi
