= Mamman Khan =

Indian politician

Member of the Haryana Legislative Assembly
- Incumbent
- Assumed office 2019
- Preceded by: Ch Naseem Ahmed
- Constituency: Ferozepur Jhirka

Personal details
- Born: 4 April 1967 (age 59) Bhadas, Ferozepur Jhirka, Haryana
- Party: Indian National Congress
- Profession: Politician, Civil Engineer

Mamman Khan is an Indian politician from the Indian National Congress, who was elected as a member of the Haryana Legislative Assembly in 2019 from Ferozepur Jhirka (Vidhan Sabha Constituency) in the Nuh district of Haryana. He is a member of the All India Congress Committee and also served as former Working President of the District Congress Committee, Nuh.

== Early life ==
Mamman Khan was born to Mohammed Hanif on 4 April 1967 in the village of Bhadas, Ferozepur Jhirka. He completed high school at a small school in his hometown before enrolling in Civil Engineering at Bengaluru University, Karnataka in 1994. Mamman Khan also worked for DLF, a commercial real estate development company, for a while before launching a hugely successful construction supply firm.

== Political career ==
Mamman Khan contested the Ferozepur Jhirka Assembly elections independent in 2014 and was defeated by Naseem Ahmed by only 3,245 votes. Mamman Khan then won the Ferozepur Jhirka Assembly elections under the Indian National Congress by a margin of 37,004 votes against Naseem Ahmed. This landslide victory was attributed to a variety of factors, including Ahmed's transfer from the Indian National Lok Dal to the Bharatiya Janata Party, which is unpopular amongst the predominantly Muslim Meos inhabiting the region, as well as Mamman receiving the candidacy ticket from the Indian National Congress.

== Electoral Performance ==
2019 Haryana Legislative Assembly election : Ferozepur Jhirka
Party	Candidate	Votes	%	±%
INC	Mamman Khan	84,546	57.62%	▲45.97
BJP	Naseem Ahmed	47,542	32.40%	▲20.31
JJP	Aman Ahmed	9,818	6.69%	New
BSP	Raghubir	1,314	0.90%	New
Sarva Hit Party	Mavashi	1,169	0.80%	New
Margin of victory		37,004	25.22%	▲22.85
Turnout		1,46,736	70.24%	▼5.14
Registered electors		2,08,910		▲15.08
INC gain from INLD		Swing	▲28.15	

2014 Haryana Legislative Assembly election : Ferozepur Jhirka
Party	Candidate	Votes	%	±%
INLD	Naseem Ahmed	40,320	29.47%	▼16.69
Independent	Mamman Khan	37,075	27.09%	New
Independent	Aman Ahmed	18,212	13.31%	New
BJP	Alam	16,540	12.09%	▲6.80
INC	Azad Mohammad	15,943	11.65%	▼14.89
Independent	Fakruddin	4,517	3.30%	New
HJC(BL)	Fakhruddin	995	0.73%	▼4.79
Independent	Mohd Ahmed	984	0.72%	New
Margin of victory		3,245	2.37%	▼17.24
Turnout		1,36,838	75.38%	▲4.03
Registered electors		1,81,528		▲39.59
INLD hold		Swing	▼16.69	

== Controversies ==
=== Alleged Involvement in the 2023 Haryana Riots ===
When speaking in the Haryana Legislative Assembly in February 2023, Mamman Khan displayed photographs depicting acts of violence allegedly by the cow vigilante, Monu Manesar. Mamman Khan raised concerns on Nasir and Junaid's incident, who were killed on the suspicion of cattle smuggling, were burnt by "influential” cow vigilantes and later they brutally thrashed them and handed them over to Ferozepur Jhirka police in Haryana, which is also Mamman Khan's constituency. This speech was not considered of any major significance until the 2023 Haryana Riots which took place in the Nuh district of Haryana, on 31 July 2023. During the riots, Mamman Khan was accused for instigating violence in the Nuh by the Home Minister of Haryana. Manohar Lal Khattar, also indirectly mentioned Mamman Khan when he said that “fingers are being pointed at some other Congress MLAs” in connection with the Nuh violence and added that absence of a response from the opposition party certainly proves that “something is suspicious".

Mamman Khan was called in front of the Special Investigation Team for an investigation into his involvement in the 2023 Haryana Riots to the Nagina village police station in Nuh. Six months proceeding the Nuh violence, Mamman Khan was later charged under the Unlawful Activities (Prevention) Act. Police had earlier accused Khan of inciting violence and being in touch with those involved in sharing provocative posts on social media platforms. Besides, he also faces some other charges in the FIR. This decision was heavily opposed by Bhupinder Singh Hooda and other members of the Indian National Congress.

=== Foiled Assassination plot ===
In October, 2025 multiple media outlets reported that the Haryana Police’s Special Task Force found out that two gangsters based abroad allegedly conspired to attack Khan. According to police, four associates in India were arrested for conducting reconnaissance, and a pistol was recovered during raids. Following the intelligence inputs, security around Khan was increased while the investigation continued.
