= DND Flyway =

India's first 8-lane wide expressway

Coordinates: 28.5801661°N 77.2770333°E

Delhi–Noida Direct Flyway
- DND Flyway
- Delhi–Noida Direct Flyway in red
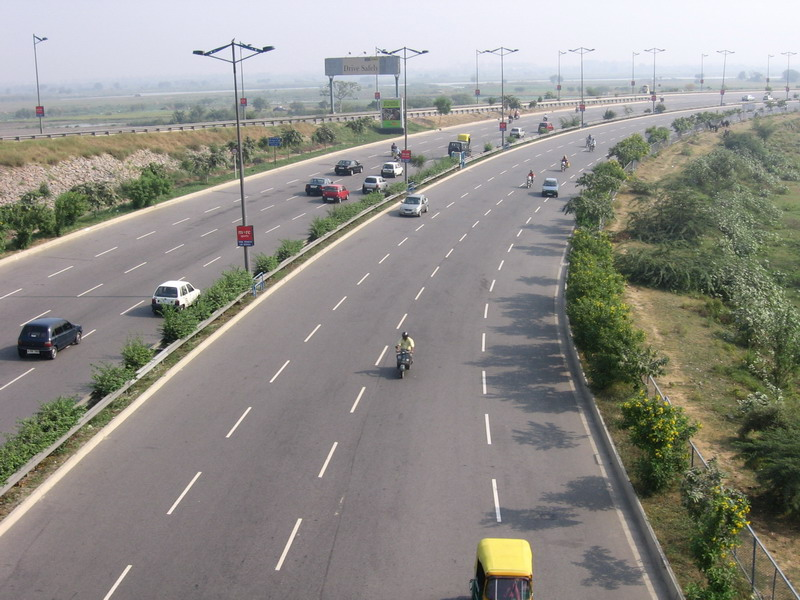

Route information
- Maintained by Noida Toll Bridge Company Limited (NTBCL)
- Length: 7.5 km (4.7 mi)
- Existed: 24 January 2001–present

Major junctions
- West end: 1. Maharani Bagh, Delhi; 2. Nizamuddin, Delhi
- East end: 1. Sector-15A, Noida; 2. Mayur Vihar, Delhi

Location
- Country: India
- States: Delhi and Uttar Pradesh
- Major cities: New Delhi and Noida

Highway system
- Roads in India; Expressways; National; State; Asian

The Delhi–Noida Direct Flyway or DND Flyway is India's first 8-lane wide, 7.5 km (4.7 mi) long access-controlled expressway in Delhi NCR. It connects Maharani Bagh and Nizamuddin on the western side to Noida (Sector-15A) and Mayur Vihar on the eastern side of the Yamuna river. The Noida Toll Bridge Company Limited (NTBCL) owned by IL&FS, operate and maintains it on build-own-operate-transfer (BOOT) basis. The expressway, which was opened to the public in January 2001 was constructed by Japan based Mitsui-Marubeni Corporation Ltd. The length of main carriageway (MCW), including bridge on Yamuna river is 6.0 km. Rest 1.5 km is Mayur Vihar link (MVL), which was opened in 2008.

DND Flyway was inaugurated four months ahead of schedule on 24 January 2001 by the then Chief Minister of Uttar Pradesh Rajnath Singh in presence of then Lt. Governor of Delhi Vijai Kapoor & the then Chief Minister of Delhi Sheila Dixit. The junction of DND Flyway and Inner Ring Road at Maharani Bagh in Delhi is the starting point of India's longest expressway i.e. Delhi–Mumbai Expressway.

== History ==
DND Flyway grew out of a need to bridge the growing population of Delhi with its neighboring places across the Yamuna river. A major portion of Delhi's population lives in the Trans-Yamuna area and there was a need to build a major connecting facility between the areas growing on both sides of the Yamuna. The project was the precursor to the National Highway Development Project and was approved by Government of India & Government of UP.

An MoU was signed on 7 April 1992 between Government of Delhi, NOIDA Authority (Government of UP) and IL&FS, led by Ministry of Urban Development (now MoHUA).

== NTBCL ==
On 8 April 1996, a special purpose vehicle (SPV) owned by the IL&FS called Noida Toll Bridge Company Limited (NTBCL) was incorporated for this job. NTBCL is also the first Indian 'Toll company' to be listed in National Stock Exchange of India (NSE) and AIM (sub-market of London Stock Exchange). The concession agreement was made for 30 years i.e. from 2001 to 2031. Mr. Pradeep Puri, a retired IAS officer of Karnataka cadre was the first President and CEO of NTBCL from 1997 to 2010. He was also its Vice-Chairman from November 2016 to August 2018. The Company is listed on the National Stock Exchange of India and the Bombay Stock Exchange of India. As of March 2018, around 65% equity of the company's is owned by the public. 26.3% of the equity is owned by ILFS Transportation Networks Ltd. 5.4% of the equity is owned by Noida Authority.

== Construction ==
The implementing agency was NTBCL, which was owned by the IL&FS. NTBCL had given the civil Construction work of DND Flyway to Japan based Mitsui-Marubeni Corporation Ltd. It has grade separated Trumpet interchange on Delhi end and Cloverleaf interchange on Noida end which is further connected to the Noida–Greater Noida Expressway. Denmark based Kampsax International was tasked with surveying, mapping & providing geographic information for the project.

The project included the construction of a flyover at Ashram Chowk which was handed over to the Delhi Public Works Department (PWD) for maintenance. The 552.5 meter long Main bridge and 3 minor bridges over the Yamuna river was constructed at a cost of ₹408 crores (₹4.08 billion), whose construction was started on 1 January 1999. The commercial service for public was started on 7 February 2001, costing ₹8 for one side journey. NTBCL in 2006, started the construction of a 1.5 km long extension to link Mayur Vihar with DND Flyway which was opened to traffic on 19 January 2008.

== Toll collection ==
Delhi–Noida Direct Flyway is also India's first road project to have electronic toll collection (ETC) lanes. The Allahabad High Court had on 26 October 2016, ordered that no toll would be collected from the commuters on the DND Flyway on a PIL by the Federation of Noida Residents Welfare Association (FONRWA). Later the Supreme Court of India on 13 July 2018, maintained that no tax will be levied on for now. The court was hearing a plea filed by the NTBCL against an Allahabad HC order.

The NTBCL official says that its income and funds both have dried up after the stretch was made toll-free in 2016. The company has been trying to stay afloat on the basis of advertising revenues by selling hoardings and signboards along the expressway.

== Entry/ Exits ==
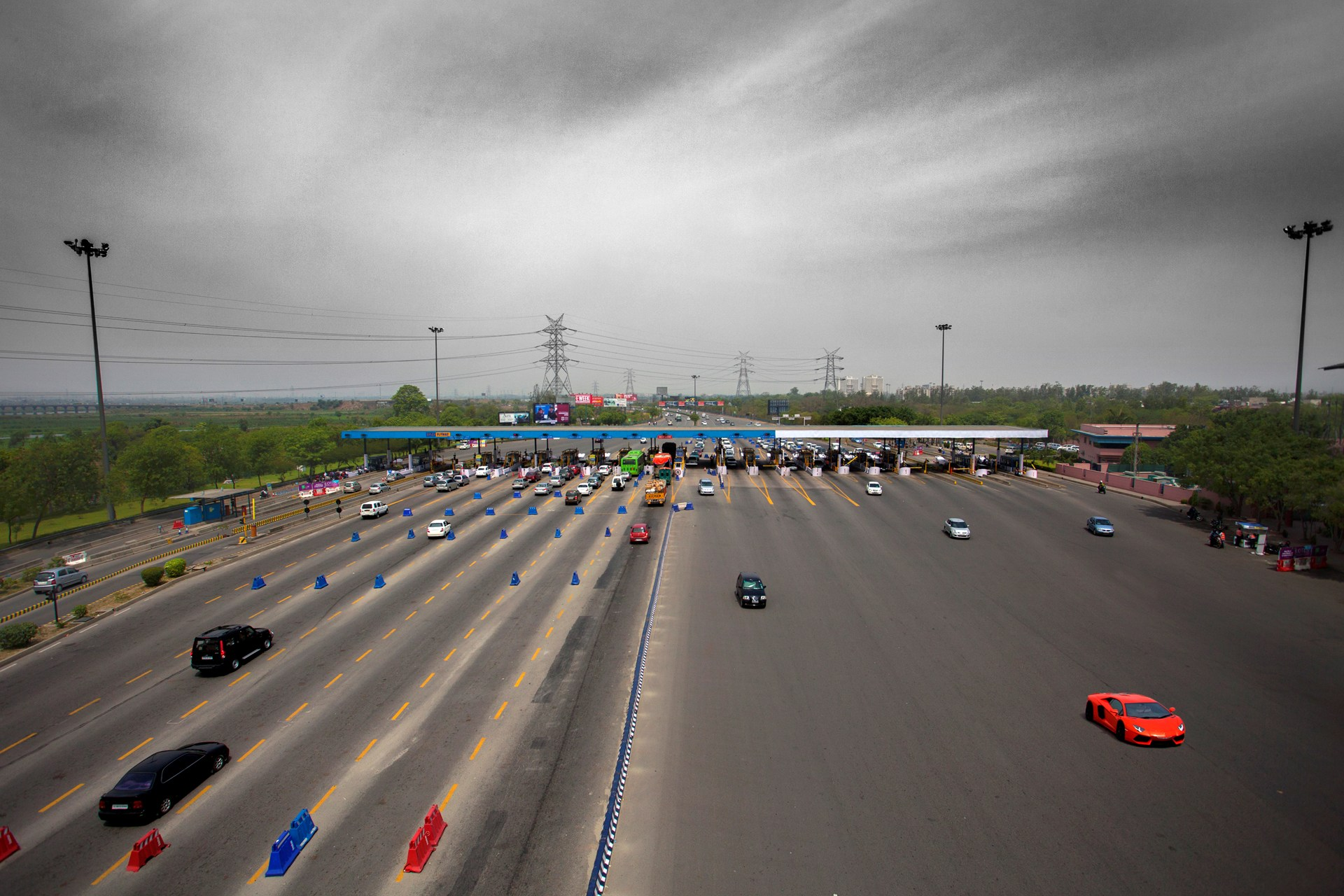
32-lane Toll Plaza of DND Flyway

The following table lists the exits in Noida and Delhi.

State	Side	Exit Location	Destinations
Uttar Pradesh	East	Sector 15A, Noida	Sector 15 & 15A, Sector 16 & 16A (Noida Film City), Sector 17, Sector 18 and Sector 37
Delhi	East	Mayur Vihar Extension	New Ashok Nagar, Patparganj, Vasundhara Enclave, Mayur Vihar
Delhi	West	Maharani Bagh	AIIMS, Ashram, Lajpat Nagar, Maharani Bagh, New Friends Colony
Delhi	West	Nizamuddin	Delhi Zoo, Nizamuddin, Pragati Maidan, ISBT Sarai Kale Khan

== Status updates ==
- Apr 1996: An SPV named Noida Toll Bridge Company Limited (NTBCL) is formed on 8 April.
- Jan 1999: Construction work started by Mitsui-Marubeni Corporation under the aegis of NTBCL.
- Jan 2001: Expressway is inaugurated jointly by Lt. Governor of Delhi, CM of Delhi and CM of Uttar Pradesh on 24 January.
- Jan 2008: Extension link to Mayur Vihar opened to the public on 19 January.
- Oct 2016: Allahabad High Court on 26 October, ordered that no toll would be collected from the commuters.
- Jul 2018: Supreme Court of India upheld the ruling of Allahabad HC on 13 July. DND Flyway to remain Toll-free.

== See also ==
- Expressways in India
- Highways passing from Delhi
- Delhi–Mumbai Expressway
- Delhi-Gurgaon Expressway
- Delhi–Faridabad Skyway
- Delhi-Meerut Expressway
- Dwarka Expressway
- Yamuna Expressway
