= List of cross LOC military operations =

The line of control which lies between the Indian and Pakistani controlled parts of the former princely state of Jammu and Kashmir is the de facto boundary which is generally respected by both sides. Indian and Pakistani troops have on occasion tried to alter the areas under their control in large scale operations. There have also been punitive expeditions across the border.

Acts of brutality and mutilation are a regular occurrence along the Line of Control. Armed teams of soldiers and militants are known to cross the border, outnumber a post and inflict heavy casualties and utilize beheading as an act of humiliation. Both sides have blamed each other for carrying out such cross-border attacks and denied their participation in such raids.

Lt. Gen. H. S. Panag, a former Indian army general, states that the Indian military usually used to conceal the incidents of beheading of Indian soldiers. However, nowadays it is becoming increasing difficult to conceal these incidents as soldiers and even porters working at military post have mobile phones. Indian media reports that from 1998 to 2003, Pakistan military conducted around 21 raids in Indian territories. Around 41 Indian soldiers were killed and 76 were injured in those raids. Pakistan's confidential UNMOGIP filings alleged that cross-LoC raids and attacks resulted in the deaths of at least 29 Pakistani civilians over that period, including notable early incidents such as the March 1998 Bandala civilian massacre in the Chhamb sector, where Pakistan reported 22 civilians killed and some bodies mutilated or decapitated. Pakistan accused Indian forces of killing many Pakistani soldiers and beheading at least 12 Pakistani soldiers in cross-LoC operations over a 15-year span.

Since 2021, India and Pakistan agreed to a ceasefire and such incidents have not been reported since.

== List of military operations across the LOC ==
Incident	Date	Description	Remarks
Operation Meghdoot	13 April 1984	India successfully occupied all of the Siachen Glacier.	India received intelligence that Pakistan was planning to occupy the Siachen glacier and executed an operation to deny the territory. This sparked a confrontation which has continued ever since.
Bandala Seri Massacre	26–27 March 1998	Indian Army special forces attacked Bandala village in the Chamb sector of LoC in Pakistani administered Kashmir region.	Indian Army special forces crossed the LoC on the night of 26–27 March 1998 and hacked 22 Pakistanis to death. According to Pakistan, the bodies of 2 Pakistanis were chopped off and were taken across LoC to India; the eyes of several others were gouged out by Indian soldiers. The Pakistani military claimed to have recovered an Indian-made watch from the scene of the carnage, along with a hand-written note which asked, “How does your own blood feel”? The massacre was committed by India in response to Prankote massacre of Hindu civilians by LeT
Binda Mohri Sehri massacare	27 April 1998	Indian Army attacked Binda Mohri Sehri village, 600 metres across the Line of Control (LoC) inside Pakistan administered Kashmir	Pakistan alleged that Indian Army soldiers carried out an massacare resulting in the deaths of 21 villagers, part of a cycle of cross-border retaliatory skirmishes and artillery exchanges during that period.
The Kargil War	May–July 1999	Pakistan tried to occupy Indian territory, to gain tactical advantage.	Pakistani army soldiers and militants infiltrated positions on the Indian side of the LOC in an attempt to occupy strategic peaks, but failed and withdrew after an Indian counter-offensive.
Chamb raid	22 January 2000	Indian army personnel raided a Pakistani post in Chamb sector.	Indian soldiers attacked a Pakistan Army post after midnight from three directions in the Iftikharabad sub-sector in the Chamb area. Seven Pakistani soldiers were captured and killed in the attack which was seen as a retaliation for the loss of Lt.Saurabh Kalia and 4 soldiers of 4 jat.
Lanjot Village masscare	25 February 2000	Indian Army para commandos attacked Pakistani administered Lanjot Village, Nikal sector.	Indian Army para commandos crossed over LoC at midnight into Lanjot village entered an house and brutally hacked 14 Pakistanis to death with 3 Pakistanis later succumbed to injuries. The heads of some men were chopped off and were taken across to India. The Dawn wrote that some killed people had deep dagger wounds in their skulls.
Ashok Listening Post attack	27 February 2000	Pakistani Soldiers attacked an Indian Post.	The Pakistani Special Services Group (SSG) conducted an operation in which 7 soldiers of the 17 Maratha Light Infantry manning the post were killed, and a soldier by the name of Bhausaheb Maruti Talekar was beheaded. His head was taken back to Pakistan as a trophy.
Attack on Indian military listening post in Poonch sector	August 2000	Pakistan's special forces attack an Indian military post.	Pakistan's special forces conducted an attack on an Indian military post in Poonch sector, killing three Indian soldiers and injuring seven others. Indian officials believe that the attack was in retaliation against an Indian army attack on a Pakistani post in Chamb.
Akbar post raid	August 2000	Indian soldiers raided a Pakistani post	An officer and thirteen soldiers of the Pakistani army were killed in a raid carried out by Indian troops following the end of the Kargil War. The slain officer was the son of a high ranking officer in Pakistani army.
Attack on Indian military listening post in Uri sector of Baramulla district	February 2003	Pakistan's Border Action Team (BAT) attacked an Indian post.	Pakistan's Border Action Team conducted a raid on an Indian army listening post in the Uri sector of the Baramulla district. Around four Indian soldiers were killed.
Pakistani post near Bhimber Gali in Poonch attacked.	18 September 2003	Indian soldiers attacked Pakistani post.	A JCO and three soldiers were killed in the attack. One soldier was allegedly decapitated, and his head was carried off as a trophy. Pakistan Lodged a complaint with the UNMOGIP.
Kranti post near Salhotri village in Poonch was attacked.	5 June 2008	Pakistani soldiers attacked Indian post.	A soldier in the 2-8 Gurkha Regiment, Jawashwar Chhame, was killed.
Pakistani post near Bhattal sector in Poonch attacked.	19 June 2008	Indian soldiers attacked Pakistani post.	Pakistan lodged a complaint with the UNMOGIP that Indian troops entered into Pakistan administered Kashmir, beheaded a soldier, and carried his head across. Four Pakistani soldiers allegedly died in the raid.
Indian army post in Gugaldhar ridge in Kupwara attacked	30 July 2011	Pakistan's Border Action Team (BAT) conducted the attack across the LoC	Pakistan's Border Action Team (BAT) attacked an Indian military post in Kupwara, killing 6 Indian soldiers belonging to 19 Rajput battalion and 20 Kumaon battalion. Two Indian soldiers of 20 Kumaon Regiment were beheaded by Pakistani Border Action Team (BAT) troops. Their heads were taken as a trophy. The attacking team took back the heads of Havildar Jaipal Singh Adhikari and Lance Naik Devender Singh of 20 Kumaon.
Operation Ginger Sharda sector, across the Neelam river valley in Kel.	29 August 2011	Indian para commandos conducted a covert strike across the border	India claims to kill 13 Pakistani soldiers in a cross LoC raid by Para SF commandos.Pakistani soldiers Subedar Parvez, Havildar Aftab and Naik Imran were beheaded, and their heads and rank insignias brought to India. Pakistan complained to the UNMOGIP that three soldiers, including a JCO were killed.
Beheading of Lance Naik Hemraj	8 January 2013	Pakistani soldiers crossed the LoC and ambushed Indian soldiers.	Lance Naik Hemraj and Lance Naik Sudhakar Singh were killed. Indian officials claimed that both bodies were mutilated, and that Hemraj was decapitated. Indian troops failed to recover the head even after a search of the area. India believes the Pakistanis took the head of Hemraj when they retreated.
Sarla post of Indian Army in Chakandabad Bagh area of Poonch sector	6 August 2013	Pakistani Border Action Team ambushed an Indian Army demolition patrol	Indian officials claimed that 20 armed militants, along with Pakistani Army soldiers, carried out an ambush and killed 5 soldiers of the 21 Bihar. Pakistani officials denied any involvement in the incident.
2016 India–Pakistan military confrontation	28 September 2016	Indian Para commandos stuck multiple terrorist launch pads along the LoC	India conducted "surgical strikes" against alleged militant launch pads across the Line of Control in Pakistani-Administered Kashmir, and inflicted "significant casualties". Indian media reported the casualty figures variously, from 35 to 50. Pakistan denied Indian claims.
Indian patrol attacked in Krishna Gati sector of Poonch district	2 May 2017	Pakistan Border Action Team (BAT) ambushed an Indian patrol along the LoC	India claimed that a Border Action Team (BAT) of the Pakistan Army ambushed a patrol of about 9-10 soldiers from the 22 Sikh Regiment of the Indian Army and 200 battalion of the Border Security Force. The ambush took place about 200–250 metres deep inside Indian territory, and bodies of two soldiers were mutilated.
Indian army patrol party attacked in Keri sector	23 December 2017	Pakistan border Action Team (BAT) attacked Indian patrol party	India claimed that a Border Action Team (BAT) of the Pakistan Army crossed 400m across the LoC to target a patrol party of the Indian Army. The attack resulted in the death of 4 Indian soldiers, including a major.
Pakistani patrol attacked at a temporary post in Rukh Chakri sector in Rawlakot	25 December 2017	Ghatak commandos ambushed a Pakistani patrol at a temporary post	India claimed that a team of 4–5 Ghatak commandos of Poonch Brigade under 25 Division crossed over about 200–300m across the LoC and attacked a Pakistani patrol consisting of 8–10 men in a retaliatory strike. The Indian commandos placed an IED at a temporary post and killed 3 soldiers, 1 major and 2 soldiers, and injured 1 soldier of the 59 Baloch regiment. Pakistan Foreign office denied that Indians had crossed the LoC, and claimed that 3 soldiers had died and 1 injured in response to an IED blast caused by "non-state actors".
Indian army team attacked along International border (IB)	28 September 2018	Border action team (BAT) attack Indian soldiers	A Pakistani military post attacked an Indian military team near the international border. As a result, the team retreated and later realized that 1 of its soldiers was missing. The missing soldier was later found dead. Indian military officials claim that the missing soldier was killed by the Border Action Team (BAT), which had crossed the border to attack the Indian soldiers.
