= IRB Infrastructure =

Indian construction company

IRB Infrastructure Developers Limited
- Type: Public company
- Traded as: NSE: IRB; BSE: 532947
- Industry: Conglomerate
- Founded: 27 July 1998; 28 years ago
- Headquarters: IRB Complex, Chandivali, Powai, Mumbai, India
- Key people: Virendra D. Mhaiskar (Chairman & MD)
- Services: Engineering, Procurement and Construction (EPC); Build, Operate and Transfer (BOT)
- Revenue: ₹2,750.27 crore (US$290 million) (2021)
- Net income: ₹188.51 crore (US$20 million) (2021)
- Website: www.irb.co.in www.irbinvit.co.in

IRB Infrastructure Developers Limited (formerly IRB Infrastructure Developers Private Limited, Ideal Road Builders) is an Indian highway construction company. It was incorporated in 1998, with its headquarters in Mumbai. It is part of the IRB Group and headed by Virendra Dattatraya Mhaiskar. The company primarily operates build-operate-transfer (BOT) road projects. Currently, it has about 3,404 lane km operational and about 2,330 lane km under development. Among its notable projects are the Mumbai-Pune Expressway and the Ahmedabad-Vadodara Expressway.

== History ==
IRB Infrastructure executed India's first ever BOT (build-operate-transfer) project, the Thane-Bhivandi Bypass. Over the years, its BOT portfolio (operational projects and projects under construction) in the country grew to a total length of around 12,000-lane km. IRB executed projects like the four-laning of the Goa-Karnataka border from Karwar to Kundapur section of NH66, Agra-Etawah Bypass project, Udaipur-Rajasthan NH8 project, and Kaithal to Rajasthan NH152 project.

In 2009, IRB Infra won the bid to develop the greenfield Sindhudurg Airport in the Sindhudurg district of Maharashtra on a build-operate-transfer basis.

In July 2011, IRB Infrastructure signed an agreement to develop a 102.3 km section in the Ahmedabad-Vadodara NH8 into six lanes from the existing four lanes. The project also included improvement of a 93.302 km section of the existing Ahmedabad – Vadodara Expressway (NE 1), on a Design Building Finance Operate and Transfer (DBFOT) basis.

In 2012, IRB acquired Tamil Nadu based BOT road builder MVR Infrastructure and Tollways for ₹130 crore.

IRB Infrastructure acquired the Mumbai-Pune Expressway and the Mumbai-Pune National Highway, which was concluded under the supervision of Maharashtra State Road Development Corporation (MSRDC).

IRB Infrastructure Developers Ltd. signed a contract worth ₹2,100 crore from NHAI for a six-lane project in Rajasthan and Gujarat. The project is to be developed on design, built, finance, operate and transfer (DBFOT) under the National Highways Development Programme (NHDP) phase V.

IRB achieved financial closure for its BOT project from Chittorgarh and Gulabpura. The project is an expansion of the 124.87-km section on NH79, converting from a four-lane to six-lane expressway. The concession period of this project is 20 years from the appointed date, including 910 days of construction, creating smoother transit. The total funding for the project by company will be ₹690 crore and by SPV (Special Public Vehicle) tied banks will be ₹1,400 crore.

IRB Infrastructure developed the Kaithal-Rajasthan project (NH65). The 166.26 km-long highway became operational in 2017, and has 20.90 km of service road, 18 pedestrian underpasses, 5 vehicular underpasses, 5 flyovers, 13 small bridges, 71 intersections, 241 culverts and railways over bridges. The cost of production for project was ₹2,290 crore, including a viability gap funding of ₹234 crore.

In March 2018, IRB Infrastructure won two hybrid annuity projects under NHDP phase IV in the state of Tamil Nadu, which included the four laning of NH-45A Puducherry to Poondiyankuppam and Poondiyankuppam to Sattanathapuram at a cost of ₹2,169 crore at a cost of ₹1,296 crore. The construction period is 730 days and the operation period is 15 years for the said projects.

The company also received a letter of award on from the National Highways Authority of India for a hybrid annuity project worth ₹1,640 crore under the National Highways Development Project phase VI in Gujarat. The order came after the company had emerged as the preferred bidder for the construction of the eight-lane Vadodara Kim expressway from Padra to Vadodara section of the Vadodara-Mumbai Expressway in Gujarat.

The company got the contract (3 out of 12 packages) of Ganga Expressway, the longest under-construction expressway in Uttar Pradesh.

== IRB InvIT Fund ==
IRB InvIT is India's first Infrastructure Investment trust sponsored by IRB Infrastructure Developers Ltd. Projects managed by IRB InvIT include:

1. Surat– Dahisar NH 8 Project
2. Tumkur to Chitradurga NH 4 Project
3. Bharuch – Surat NH 8 Project
4. Jaipur – Deoli NH 12 Project
5. Omalur – Salem – Namakkal NH 7 Project
6. Talegaon – Amravati NH 6 Project
7. Pathankot – Amritsar (Punjab) NH 15 Project
8. Kishangarh – Gualbpura (Rajasthan) NH 79 Project
9. Gualbpura - Chittorgarh (Rajasthan) NH 79 Project
10. Palsit – Dankuni (West Bengal) NH 19 Project

== Controversy ==
In April 2018, Virendra Mhaiskar, the chairman and managing director of IRB Infrastructure, and all other officials got a clean chit from CBI with regards to any sort of involvement in the murder of RTI activist Satish Shetty. They were summoned in May 2012 by the CBI, suspecting a connection with the case. During the investigation, CBI had asked Virendra Mhaiskar and other suspects to undergo a polygraph test. Mhaiskar along with the company officials had to undergo the polygraph test.

== Recognition ==
Virendra D. Mhaiskar, chairman and managing director of IRB, was conferred with the “Young Turk of the Year” award at the 6th Edition of CNBC TV 18 India Business Leader Awards on 11 December 2010 at Mumbai.

The company was given the CNBC TV 18 Essar Steel Infrastructure Excellence Award for the second time for its high quality work implemented on the Bharuch to Surat section of NH-8 under Highways and Bridges Category. The company also won the CNBC TV 18 Essar Steel Infrastructure Excellence Award in the Highways & Flyovers category for Mumbai-Pune section of NH-4 in 2009.

IRB Infrastructure Ltd won the Construction Times 2017 Award under the Best Executed Highway Project of the Year category for building the Ahmedabad–Vadodara Expressway Project.
