= Naseem Ahmed =

Indian politician

Member of the Haryana Legislative Assembly
- In office 2009–2019
- Preceded by: Azad Mohammad
- Succeeded by: Mamman Khan
- Constituency: Ferozepur Jhirka

Personal details
- Born: 10 January 1980 (age 46) Tigaon, Ferozepur Jhirka, Nuh, Haryana
- Party: Bharatiya Janata Party
- Other political affiliations: Indian National Lok Dal (before 2019)
- Spouse: Ayyaza Khan
- Children: 5

Naseem Ahmed (born 10 January 1980) was a member of the Haryana Legislative Assembly from the Indian National Lok Dal represented the Ferozepur Jhirka Vidhan sabha Constituency in Haryana from 2014 to 2019. He joined Bharatiya Janata Party just before 2019 Haryana Legislative Assembly election.
