= Ferozepur Jhirka Assembly constituency =

Constituency of the Haryana legislative assembly in India

Coordinates: 27.789°N 76.949°E

Ferozepur Jhirka
- Constituency No. 80 for the Haryana Legislative Assembly

Constituency details
- Country: India
- Region: North India
- State: Haryana
- District: Nuh
- Lok Sabha constituency: Gurgaon
- Established: 1967
- Total electors: 208,594
- Reservation: None

Member of Legislative Assembly
- 15th Haryana Legislative Assembly
- Incumbent Mamman Khan
- Party: Indian National Congress
- Elected year: 2024

Ferozepur Jhirka is one of the 90 constituencies in the Haryana Legislative Assembly of Indian state of Haryana. Ferozepur Jhirka is also part of Gurgaon Lok Sabha constituency.

This constituency has been primarily been occupied by the Shakrulla-Naseem clan from the political families in the region.

== Members of the Legislative Assembly ==
Election	Name	Party
1952	Yasin Khan	Indian National Congress
1957	Yasin Khan	Indian National Congress
1962	Tayyib Hussain Khan	Indian National Congress
1967	Deen Mohammad	Swatantra Party
1968	Deen Mohammad	Vishal Haryana Party
1977	Deen Mohammad	Independent
1977^	Shakrulla Khan	Independent
1982	Shakrulla Khan	Indian National Congress
1987	Ajmat Khan	Lok Dal
1991	Shakrulla Khan	Indian National Congress
1996	Azad Mohammad	Samata Party
2000	Mohammad Ilyas	Indian National Lok Dal
2005	Azad Mohammad	Indian National Congress
2009	Naseem Ahmed	Indian National Lok Dal
2014	Naseem Ahmed	Indian National Lok Dal
2019	Mamman Khan	Indian National Congress
2024	Mamman Khan	Indian National Congress

^By poll

== Election Results ==
=== Assembly Election 2024 ===
2024 Haryana Legislative Assembly election: Ferozepur Jhirka
Party	Candidate	Votes	%	±%
INC	Mamman Khan	130,497	72.03%	
BJP	Naseem Ahmed	32,056	17.69%	
INLD	Mohammad Habib	15,638	8.63%	
JJP	Jaan Mohammad	720	0.4%	
NOTA	None of the Above	439	0.24%	
Majority		98,441	54.34%	
Turnout		1,81,166		
INC hold		Swing		

=== Assembly Election 2019 ===
2019 Haryana Legislative Assembly election : Ferozepur Jhirka
Party	Candidate	Votes	%	±%
INC	Mamman Khan	84,546	57.62	▲45.97
BJP	Naseem Ahmed	47,542	32.40	▲20.31
JJP	Aman Ahmed	9,818	6.69	New
BSP	Raghubir	1,314	0.90	New
Margin of victory		37,004	25.22	▲22.85
Turnout		1,46,736	70.24	▼5.14
Registered electors		2,08,910		▲15.08
INC gain from INLD		Swing	▲28.15	

=== Assembly Election 2014 ===
2014 Haryana Legislative Assembly election : Ferozepur Jhirka
Party	Candidate	Votes	%	±%
INLD	Naseem Ahmed	40,320	29.47%	▼16.69
Independent	Mamman Khan	37,075	27.09%	New
Independent	Aman Ahmed	18,212	13.31%	New
BJP	Alam	16,540	12.09%	▲6.80
INC	Azad Mohammad	15,943	11.65%	▼14.89
Independent	Fakruddin	4,517	3.30%	New
HJC(BL)	Fakhruddin	995	0.73%	▼4.79
Independent	Mohd Ahmed	984	0.72%	New
Margin of victory		3,245	2.37%	▼17.24
Turnout		1,36,838	75.38%	▲4.03
Registered electors		1,81,528		▲39.59
INLD hold		Swing	▼16.69	

=== Assembly Election 2009 ===
2009 Haryana Legislative Assembly election : Ferozepur Jhirka
Party	Candidate	Votes	%	±%
INLD	Naseem Ahmed	42,824	46.15%	▲23.61
INC	Mamman Khan	24,630	26.54%	▼5.91
Independent	Mohd. Iqbal	12,448	13.42%	New
HJC(BL)	Aman Ahmed	5,116	5.51%	New
BJP	Dr. Mahender Kumar Garg	4,909	5.29%	▲2.15
BSP	Ghanshyam Dass	1,497	1.61%	New
Independent	Mohd. Yunus	719	0.77%	New
Margin of victory		18,194	19.61%	▲17.93
Turnout		92,791	71.35%	▲1.79
Registered electors		1,30,045		▼12.03
INLD gain from INC		Swing	▲13.70	

=== Assembly Election 2005 ===
2005 Haryana Legislative Assembly election : Ferozepur Jhirka
Party	Candidate	Votes	%	±%
INC	Azad Mohammad	33,372	32.45%	▲2.08
Independent	Shakrulla Khan	31,649	30.78%	New
INLD	Chaudhary Mohammad Ilyas	23,182	22.54%	▼27.78
Independent	Dayawati	8,544	8.31%	New
BJP	Bhani Ram	3,228	3.14%	New
Independent	Haneef	1,251	1.22%	New
Independent	Rujdar	538	0.52%	New
Margin of victory		1,723	1.68%	▼18.28
Turnout		1,02,836	69.57%	▼0.04
Registered electors		1,47,823		▲16.91
INC gain from INLD		Swing	▼17.87	

=== Assembly Election 2000 ===
2000 Haryana Legislative Assembly election : Ferozepur Jhirka
Party	Candidate	Votes	%	±%
INLD	Chaudhary Mohammad Ilyas	44,288	50.32%	New
INC	Shakrulla Khan	26,728	30.37%	▲10.41
BSP	Rakesh Kumar	14,924	16.96%	▲11.34
HVP	Abdul Razak	1,142	1.30%	▼25.65
Independent	Haneef	479	0.54%	New
Independent	Mamta	446	0.51%	New
Margin of victory		17,560	19.95%	▲16.63
Turnout		88,007	70.41%	▲6.01
Registered electors		1,26,441		▲1.17
INLD gain from SAP		Swing	▲20.06	

=== Assembly Election 1996 ===
1996 Haryana Legislative Assembly election : Ferozepur Jhirka
Party	Candidate	Votes	%	±%
SAP	Azad Mohammad	24,056	30.27%	New
HVP	Abdul Razak	21,414	26.94%	New
INC	Shakrulla Khan	15,864	19.96%	▼12.49
AIIC(T)	Ishaq	6,751	8.49%	New
BSP	Idrish	4,463	5.62%	New
SP	Mohd. Sualeh Khan	1,960	2.47%	New
JD	Sohrab	1,501	1.89%	▼25.59
Independent	Israil S/O Niwaj Khan	705	0.89%	New
Independent	Nasru	443	0.56%	New
Margin of victory		2,642	3.32%	▼1.66
Turnout		79,479	65.76%	▼0.64
Registered electors		1,24,983		▲14.96
SAP gain from INC		Swing	▼2.19	

=== Assembly Election 1991 ===
1991 Haryana Legislative Assembly election : Ferozepur Jhirka
Party	Candidate	Votes	%	±%
INC	Shakrulla Khan	22,661	32.45%	▲11.86
JD	Ishaq	19,184	27.47%	New
Independent	Iqbal	8,545	12.24%	New
BJP	Jaswant Kumar	7,285	10.43%	New
Independent	Ajmat Khan	4,523	6.48%	New
Independent	Sardar Mohammad	4,394	6.29%	New
Independent	Mubeen Khan	2,109	3.02%	New
Independent	Abdul Rahim	441	0.63%	New
JP	Altaf Hussain	428	0.61%	New
Margin of victory		3,477	4.98%	▼7.29
Turnout		69,826	67.37%	▼7.84
Registered electors		1,08,715		▲10.54
INC gain from LKD		Swing	▼0.41	

=== Assembly Election 1987 ===
1987 Haryana Legislative Assembly election : Ferozepur Jhirka
Party	Candidate	Votes	%	±%
LKD	Ajmat Khan	23,289	32.86%	New
INC	Shakrulla Khan	14,596	20.59%	▼1.33
Independent	Prem Chand Premi	12,642	17.84%	New
Independent	Sardar Khan	8,133	11.48%	New
Independent	Mubin	5,402	7.62%	New
VHP	Ishaq	3,662	5.17%	New
Independent	Karm Ilahi	1,736	2.45%	New
Independent	Lalita Devi	406	0.57%	New
Independent	Abdul Razak	371	0.52%	New
Margin of victory		8,693	12.27%	▲8.59
Turnout		70,875	73.04%	▲2.10
Registered electors		98,348		▲20.22
LKD gain from INC		Swing	▲10.93	

=== Assembly Election 1982 ===
1982 Haryana Legislative Assembly election : Ferozepur Jhirka
Party	Candidate	Votes	%	±%
INC	Shakrulla Khan	12,552	21.93%	▲10.62
Independent	Banwari Lal	10,450	18.26%	New
Independent	Ajmat Khan	10,215	17.85%	New
Independent	Yakub Khan	8,799	15.37%	New
Independent	Sardar Mohammad	5,586	9.76%	New
Independent	Din Mohhamad	2,495	4.36%	New
Independent	Yasin Khan	1,389	2.43%	New
Independent	Umar Mohd.	1,260	2.20%	New
Independent	Karam Ilahi	1,032	1.80%	New
Independent	Alisher	868	1.52%	New
Independent	Mohd. Sardar Khan	859	1.50%	New
Margin of victory		2,102	3.67%	▼2.02
Turnout		57,242	71.21%	▲8.44
Registered electors		81,810		▲17.21
INC gain from Independent		Swing	▼0.62	

=== Assembly Election 1977 ===
1977 Haryana Legislative Assembly election : Ferozepur Jhirka
Party	Candidate	Votes	%	±%
Independent	Shakrulla Khan	9,682	22.54%	New
Independent	Yakub Khan	7,236	16.85%	New
Independent	Banwari Lal	6,814	15.87%	New
JP	Shamshad	5,237	12.19%	New
INC	Abdul Razak	4,856	11.31%	▼14.72
Independent	Din Mohhamad	4,645	10.82%	New
Independent	Akhtar Hassain	1,865	4.34%	New
Independent	Bhanwar Singh	1,141	2.66%	New
Independent	Abdul Hai	957	2.23%	New
Independent	Alisher	514	1.20%	New
Margin of victory		2,446	5.70%	▼3.75
Turnout		42,947	62.57%	▼5.41
Registered electors		69,798		▲14.40
Independent hold		Swing	▼12.93	

=== Assembly Election 1972 ===
1972 Haryana Legislative Assembly election : Ferozepur Jhirka
Party	Candidate	Votes	%	±%
Independent	Abdul Razak	14,489	35.48%	New
INC	Din Mohhamad	10,631	26.03%	▼23.25
Independent	Ajmat Khan	10,176	24.92%	New
Independent	Sultan Khan	2,302	5.64%	New
Independent	Bhoria	2,236	5.47%	New
Independent	Girdhari Lal	1,008	2.47%	New
Margin of victory		3,858	9.45%	▲8.01
Turnout		40,842	68.91%	▲21.23
Registered electors		61,012		▲13.13
Independent gain from VHP		Swing	▼15.24	

=== Assembly Election 1968 ===
1968 Haryana Legislative Assembly election : Ferozepur Jhirka
Party	Candidate	Votes	%	±%
VHP	Abdul Razak	12,503	50.72%	New
INC	Imam Khan	12,148	49.28%	▲1.88
Margin of victory		355	1.44%	▼3.75
Turnout		24,651	47.25%	▼21.52
Registered electors		53,931		
VHP gain from SWA		Swing		

=== Assembly Election 1967 ===
1967 Haryana Legislative Assembly election : Ferozepur Jhirka
Party	Candidate	Votes	%	±%
SWA	D. Mohammad	19,040	52.60%	New
INC	T. Huisain	17,160	47.40%	New
Margin of victory		1,880	5.19%	
Turnout		36,200	70.20%	
Registered electors		53,848		
SWA win (new seat)				

== See also ==
- Ferozepur Jhirka
- Mewat district
- List of constituencies of Haryana Legislative Assembly
