= Kolgaon, Haryana =

Kolgaon
- Location in Haryana, India Kolgaon (India)
- Coordinates: 27°39′48″N 76°56′57″E
- Country: India
- State: Haryana
- District: Nuh
- Elevation: 187 m (614 ft)

Population (2011)
  - Total: 2,862

Languages
  - Official: Hindi
- Time zone: UTC+5:30 (IST)
- ISO 3166 code: IN-HR
- Website: mewat.gov.in

Kolgaon is a village in the Ferozepur Jhirka sub-division of Nuh District, Haryana state, India.

It is located in the Mewat region of Haryana.

== Geography ==
It is located next to Aravalli Range on the foothill of Kalinjar-Mohun-Kolgaon ridge of Delhi Supergroup.

== Demography ==
It had a population of 2862 in 498 houses as per 2011 Census of India. 1497 of the population were noted as male and 1365 female.

== Administration ==
The village local governance is managed by the elected panchayat headed by the Sarpanch.

== See also ==
- Bhiwadi
- Bhadas
- Gurgaon
- Moolthan
