= Ilyas Kashmiri =

Pakistani al-Qaeda militant (1964–2011)

Maulana, Mufti Ilyas Kashmiri
- الیاس کشمیری
- Ilyas Kashmiri
- Born: 10 February 1964; Thathi, Azad Kashmir, Pakistan
- Died: 3 June 2011 (aged 47); North Waziristan, Federally Administered Tribal Areas, Pakistan
- Cause of death: Drone strike
- Education: Jamia Uloom-ul-Islamia; Allama Iqbal Open University
- Occupations: Pakistani SSG; Militant
- Organization(s): Harkat-ul-Jihad al-Islami; Harkat-ul-Mujahideen; Jaish-e-Mohammad; 313 Brigade
- Known for: Beheading of Bhausaheb Maruti Talekar
- Movement: 313 Brigade

Ilyas Kashmiri (Note: Also referred to as Maulana Ilyas Kashmiri, Mufti Ilyas Kashmiri and Muhammad Ilyas Kashmiri) (Urdu: الیاس کشمیری, romanized: Ilyās Kaśmīrī; 10 February 1964 – 3 June 2011) was a Pakistani Special Forces Operator turned Islamist jihadist militant leader. He was a major insurgent in Jammu and Kashmir, and had fought against Indian troops there during several engagements. He was killed on 3 June 2011 in US drone attack on a compound in South Waziristan district.

NBC News said that United States officials had mentioned him as a possible successor to Osama bin Laden as head of Al-Qaeda. Prior to his death, a CNN headline called him the "most dangerous man on Earth", and the journalist Syed Saleem Shahzad said, "He is invariably described by the world intelligence agencies as the most effective, dangerous, and successful guerrilla leader in the world."

== Early life and education ==
Kashmiri was born on 10 February 1964 in Thathi village Samahni, Bhimber District, Pakistan-administered Azad Kashmir. He would later himself build a madrasa as well a mosque in his home village Thathi, with his wife and four children living next to these buildings.

Kashmiri served in the Pakistan Army's Special Services Group (SSG), its elite special forces. However he denied this in an interview with journalist Syed Saleem Shahzad.

His school teacher described the young Kashmiri as "an obedient student, a good athlete and an excellent debater." Kashmiri later spent a year studying communications at the Allama Iqbal Open University. He also studied for some time in Karachi's Jamia Uloom-ul-Islamia, where he'd form, with two follow students, the nucleus of what would become the first jihadist outfit of the country, Harkat-ul-Jihad al-Islami (HuJI). He was physically described by the US Department of State as "approximately six feet tall" and weighting "about 200 pounds."

== Military career and militant activities ==
=== Afghanistan activities ===
During the Soviet-Afghan War in Afghanistan, Ilyas Kashmiri trained Afghan mujahideen rebels in the handling and usage of explosives in Miranshah, Khyber Pakhtunkhwa on behalf of Pakistan. During the fighting, he lost an eye and an index finger.

=== Kashmir activities ===
Kashmiri continued his militant activities in Kashmir after the war as a member of Harkat-ul-Jihad al-Islami (HuJI), though disagreements with leader Qari Saifullah Akhtar several years after initially joining in 1991 led Kashmiri to establish his own new unit within HuJI known as the 313 Brigade. During the mid-1990s, Kashmiri and Nasrullah Mansoor Langrial were near Poonch when they were seized by the Indian Army and sent to prison, where he would spend the next two years before escaping and returning to Pakistan. Upon his return Kashmiri continued to conduct operations against India. He was reportedly being rewarded personally with Rs 1,00,000 (about US$1,164.24) by then Army Chief General Pervez Musharraf for presenting the severed head of Bhausaheb Maruti Talekar, an Indian Army soldier to him. Pictures of Kashmiri with the head of the soldier in his hands were published in some Pakistani newspapers.

=== Post-Kashmir activities ===
Kashmiri rejected orders to serve under Maulana Masood Azhar in the newly founded jihadist organisation Jaish-e-Mohammed and was once even targeted by the group. Falling out of favour with the Pakistani military, he was taken into custody and tortured in late 2003 in the wake of an attempt to assassinate President Musharraf. From his release in February 2004 until the 2007 siege of Lal Masjid he apparently did little, but later returned to the 313 Brigade in the terrorist organisation Harkat-ul-Jihad al-Islami (HuJI), which is closely tied to Al-Qaeda. Kashmiri rebuilt its strength while collaborating with the Taliban. This was part of a broader movement of Kashmir militants moving to Waziristan, and Kashmiri reportedly moved personnel from his Kotli training camp (in Azad Kashmir) to a new one in Razmak (North Waziristan district, Khyber Pakhtunkhwa). A U.S. indictment of Kashmiri stated that he "was in regular contact with al Qaeda [their italics] and in particular with Mustafa Abu al Yazid..."

Kashmiri has been associated with a number of attacks, including the 2008 Mumbai attacks, the 2010 Pune bombing, the assassination of Benazir Bhutto and the killing of Ameer Faisal Alavi. Syed Saleem Shahzad wrote that Kashmiri proposed the Mumbai attacks to Al-Qaeda leaders as a way to create a war that would bring operations against Al-Qaeda to a halt. The plan was approved and given to former LeT commander Major Haroon Ashique. According to Asia Times Online, Kashmiri was behind a 2008 plan to assassinate Chief of Army Staff General Ashfaq Parvez Kayani as he stepped out of his car during daily visits to a gym; however, the Al-Qaeda leadership rejected the plan on strategic grounds. According to The News International, Kashmiri is accused of organising the December 2009 Camp Chapman attack against the CIA and the United States was seeking his arrest and extradition.

In early 2010, Kashmiri was reported to be the new leader of Al-Qaeda's Lashkar al-Zil, or Shadow Army, following the death of its former leader Abdullah Said al Libi by an American drone. According to journalist Amir Mir, citing Pakistani security sources, Kashmiri was subsequently assigned the role of organising attacks against Western targets after the regional command was taken by Saif Al-Adel, a former Egyptian army colonel newly released from Iran. Before his death, bin Laden had asked Kashmiri to plan an attack on Barack Obama, according to a column by David Ignatius published on the Washington Post web site. Ignatius stated that his column was based on documents seized from the raid on bin Laden's compound. In the wake of the killing of Al-Qaeda leader Osama bin Laden on 2 May 2011 during an American operation in Abbottabad, Khyber Pakhtunkhwa, Pakistan, terrorism analysts put forth Kashmiri's name as one of several possible successors to lead the organisation.

==== U.S. indictment ====
On 27 October 2009, a press release from the U.S. Department of Justice named Kashmiri as a conspirator to whom an American citizen from Chicago, David Headley, arrested on terrorism related charges, "allegedly reported and attempted to report". The statement also noted that Kashmiri "issued a statement this month that he was alive and working with Al-Qaeda". A report on details of the investigation stated that Kashmiri "was in regular contact with Headley for some time and their communications suggested that they were in the process of plotting fresh attacks in India." Headley was reportedly distraught at news of Kashmiri's death, but after receiving confirmation that he was still alive, set off for Pakistan, at which time he was arrested by the FBI. Kashmiri was officially indicted on two counts, for "conspiracy to murder and maim in Denmark" (against the newspaper Jyllands-Posten) and "conspiracy to provide material support to terrorism in Denmark". During court testimony on 31 May 2011, Headley indicated that he had conducted preliminary research for Kashmiri in a plot targeting Robert J. Stevens, the CEO of Lockheed-Martin, the defence contractor.

==== Blacklisted as a terrorist by the US and the UN ====
On 6 August 2010, the United States labelled Kashmiri a "Specially Designated Global Terrorist" while the United Nations added him and his group HuJI to its ISIL (Da'esh) and Al-Qaida Sanctions Committee blacklist established under UN Security Council Resolution 1267. The label allows the United States to freeze any of his assets in US jurisdiction and to "prohibit US persons from engaging in any transactions with him." The UN resolution requires UN member states to freeze assets, ban travel and ban the sale of arms to Kashmiri and HuJI.

==== Assassination attempt and reported death in 2009 ====
Kashmiri was reported killed along with Hanifullah Janikhel and Kaleemullah in Machikhel, North Waziristan district on 7 September 2009 when they were hit by a missile fired from a U.S. drone. At the time he was reportedly one of the top 10 most wanted militant commanders in Pakistan. However, in mid-October Kashmiri was reported to have survived the airstrike and granted an interview to Asia Times's Syed Saleem Shahzad. A senior American official was later quoted by The Washington Times as saying, "While there were preliminary indications that Kashmiri may have been dead, there is now reason to believe that he could be alive". One rumour among militants asserted that Kashmiri had been outside urinating when the house he was staying at was hit.

== Death ==
On 3 June 2011, a US drone attack targeted a compound in the Ghwakhwa area of South Waziristan district, a Taliban stronghold. Nine islamic jihadists, including Ilyas Kashmiri, were reportedly killed in the missile strike. Three other militants were badly injured in the attack. Local officials reported that the militants in the compound were all members of the Tehrik-i-Taliban Pakistan. Kashmiri had moved to Wana from Khyber Pakhtunkhwa 10 days earlier.

Lala Wazir, a spokesman for Mullah Nazir, a Taliban commander associated with the owner of the compound which was attacked, confirmed his death. Qari Muhammad Idress, a close aide to Kashmiri and a senior HuJI commander, also claimed he was killed in the drone strike. Al-Qaeda also eulogised Kashmiri in the August issue of the Nawai Afghan Jihad magazine. On 7 July 2011, CNN reported that an unnamed US Intelligence official said US officials were 99 percent certain Kashmiri was killed but he added "the folks that make that determination aren't ready to say so definitively." The US State Department's Rewards for Justice Program, which at one at point designated Kashmiri as a wanted terrorist and offered a US$5,000,000 bounty for information leading to his capture, removed him from the list after he was killed. On 31 August 2016, Asia Times reported that a well known Taliban commander named Shah Sahib had replaced Kashmiri as commander of the Brigade 313.

However, doubts remained of his death. A spokesman for the Tehrik-i-Taliban Pakistan (TTP) stated in June 2011 that Kashmiri was alive and well. In mid-July 2016, Dawn reported that Kashmiri was still alive and active in the border areas of Pakistan and Afghanistan. On 30 July 2011, the Indian government listed him as one of the nation's five most wanted fugitives, indicating that Indian authorities think Kashmiri might still be alive. In March 2012, the Daily Times reported that "reliable sources" had recently seen Kashmiri meeting with TTP head Hakimullah Mehsud in North Waziristan district, but that journalists were unable to access the tribal regions in northern Pakistan to verify the report.

Shortly after his death, the Pakistan Ministry of Interior alleged that Kashmiri's group had organised the assassination of Minister of Minority Affairs Shahbaz Bhatti and The Daily Telegraph reported based on unnamed Pakistani officials that Kashmiri was organising a death squad to avenge Osama Bin Laden's death. On 16 March 2012, Ustad Ahmad Farooq, Al-Qaeda's lead spokesman in Pakistan, confirmed Kashmiri's death in an audiotape and eulogised him along with other pro-Al Qaeda militant leaders that were killed by US airstrikes in the tribal region. On 10 May 2012, the United Nations Security Council officially labeled Kashmiri as "reportedly deceased" on the Al Qaeda Sanctions list and made it clear that they would treat him as dead until it could be proven otherwise.

== In popular culture ==
Character inspired from Ilyas Kashmiri was portrayed as "Major Iqbal" by actor Arjun Rampal in the 2025-26 Indian spy action thriller duology Dhurandhar and Dhurandhar: The Revenge.
