= National Highway 8 (India, old numbering) =

Highway in India

National Highway 8
- Map of Old NH 8 in red

Route information
- Maintained by National Highways Authority of India
- Length: 2,807 km (1,744 mi)

Major junctions
- North end: New Delhi
- List: NH 1 in Delhi; NH 2 in Delhi; NH 10 in Delhi; NH 24 in Delhi; NH 71 in Bawal; NH 11A in Manoharpur; NH 11 in Jaipur; NH 12 in Jaipur; NH 79A in Kishangarh; NH 79 in Ajmer; NH 89 in Ajmer; NH 14 in Beawar; NH 76 in Udaipur; NH 8C in Chiloda; NH 59 in Ahmedabad; Ahmedabad Vadodara Expressway in Vadodara; Ahmedabad Vadodara Expressway in Kheda; NH 6 in Surat; NH 3 in Mumbai
- South end: Mumbai

Location
- Country: India
- Primary destinations: Jaipur - Ajmer - Beawar - Udaipur - Ahmedabad - Kheda - Nadiad- Anand - Vadodara - Surat - Navsari

Highway system
- Roads in India; Expressways; National; State; Asian
← NH 7A	→ NH 48A

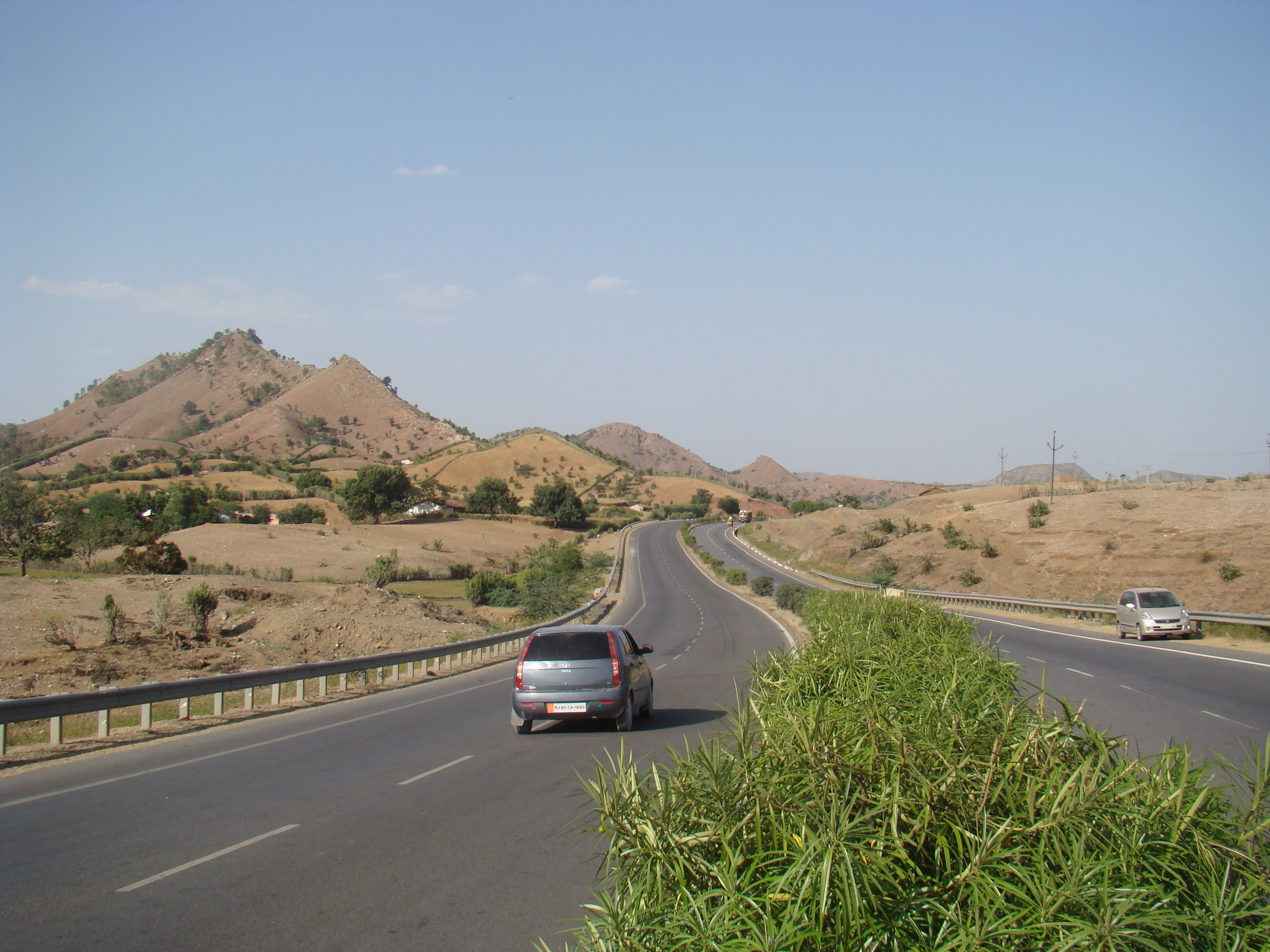
NH 48 between Udaipur and Ahmedabad

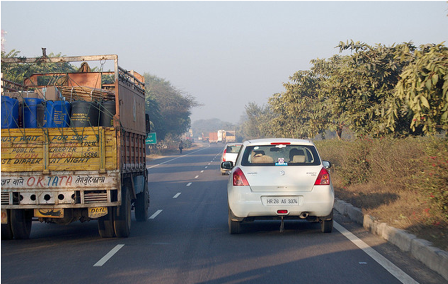
Section of NH48 between Delhi and Jaipur

National Highway 8 (NH 8) is a 4-lane (6-lane in most parts) National Highway in India. According to estimates, it is the busiest highway in the subcontinent, as it connects the national capital Delhi to the financial capital Mumbai, as well as important cities Gurgaon, Jaipur, Ajmer, Udaipur, Ahmedabad, Kheda, Nadiad, Anand, Vadodara, Surat, The total length is 1428km. Under the new numbering it has become part of the NH48.

The highway is part of the Golden Quadrilateral project undertaken by National Highways Authority of India (NHAI) and was the first section to be completed. The Delhi-Gurgaon Expressway, Jaipur-Kishangarh Expressway, and Ahmedabad Vadodara Expressway are part of NH 8. Before entering downtown Mumbai, NH 8 passes through nearly all the suburbs on the western line of Mumbai Suburban Railway, where it is popularly known as Western Express Highway.

== Route ==
- Delhi
- Gurgaon
- Manesar
- Bawal
- Shahjahanpur
- Behror
- Paota
- Shahpura
- Jaipur
- Dudu
- Ajmer
- Beawar
- Bhim
- Rajsamand
- Nathdwara
- Udaipur
- Shamlaji
- Himatnagar
- Gandhinagar
- Ahmedabad
- Kheda
- Nadiad
- Anand / Vasad
- Vadodara
- Bharuch
- Ankleshwar
- Surat
- Valsad / Chikhli, Gujarat
- Vapi
- Thane
- Mumbai

== Delhi Mumbai Industrial Corridor Project ==
This Indo-Japanese multi-billion Corridor lies on National Highway-8. Delhi Mumbai Industrial Corridor Development Corporation Limited (DMICDC), the special purpose vehicle (SPV) floated by the government of India for implementing the DMIC projects, had appointed the consultant for undertaking a study on the master plan for the Manesar-Bawal Investment Region (MBIR) and undertaking pre-feasibility studies for two early bird projects. The Haryana government had identified four Early Bird Projects to be implemented as a pilot initiative within the DMIC region, which includes Mass Rapid Transportation System between Gurgaon-Manesar-Bawal, exhibition-cum-convention centre, integrated multi-modal logistics hub and new passenger rail link. The first phase was completed by 2012 with an estimated $90 billion (Rs 4,23,000 crore) invested in developing infrastructure in the investment regions.

== Northern Peripheral Road or Dwarka Expressway ==
The Northern Peripheral Road (commonly known as Dwarka Expressway) is being developed under the public private partnership (PPP) model. This stretch will connect Dwarka with NH 8 (now renumbered National Highway 48 (India)|NH 48) at Kherki Dhaula and will intersect Gurgaon-Pataudi road.

Dwarka Expressway has been planned as an alternate link road between Delhi and Gurgaon, and is expected to ease traffic congestion on the Delhi-Gurgaon Expressway. The road will also provide connectivity to the Garhi Harsaru dry depot ICD. It was planned to be completed in 2013 but has faced many hurdles as land on some sections has not been acquired. It has been declared a national highway and numbered NH 248-BB to overcome the hurdle of land acquisition as NHAI can acquire land directly bypassing the state governments. It may be completed in 2023.

== See also ==
- List of national highways in India
- National Highways Development Project
