= Moolthan =

- Location in Haryana, India Moolthan (India)
- Coordinates: 27°57′54″N 76°56′55″E
- Country: India
- State: Haryana
- District: Nuh
- Elevation: 187 m (614 ft)

Population (2011)
  - Total: 2,732

Languages
  - Official: Hindi
- Time zone: UTC+5:30 (IST)
- PIN: 122108 Vehicle registration plate = HR-93
- ISO 3166 code: IN-HR
- Website: mewat.gov.in

Moolthan is a village in Ferozepur Jhirka sub-division of Nuh district in Haryana state, India. The village lies in the Mewat region of Delhi NCR. It is located on Delhi–Mumbai Expressway on the Haryana-Rajasthan border.

== Demography ==
It had a population of 2,732 in 498 houses as per 2011 census of India, with a literacy rate of 55.90% compared to 75.55% of Haryana, Male literacy of 72.08% and female literacy of 38.27%. Out of the population, 1426 persons were recorded as male and 1306 as female.

== Administration ==
Moolthan village local governance is managed by the elected panchayat headed by the Sarpanch.

== See also ==
- Bhiwadi
- Bhadas
- Gurgaon
