= Ahmedabad–Vadodara Expressway =

Road in India

Ahmedabad Vadodara Expressway
- Mahatma Gandhi Expressway

Route information
- Maintained by National Highways Authority of India (NHAI)
- Length: 93.1 km (57.8 mi)
- Existed: 16 August 2004; 21 years ago–present

Major junctions
- North end: Ahmedabad
- List: NH 47 / NH 48 in Ahmedabad; SH 12 in Nadiad; SH 60 in Anand; NE 4 in Vadodara
- South end: NH 48 in Vadodara

Location
- Country: India
- States: Gujarat
- Major cities: Nadiad/Kheda, Anand

Highway system
- Roads in India; Expressways; National; State; Asian

The Ahmedabad Vadodara Expressway or Mahatma Gandhi Expressway or National Expressway 1 is an expressway connecting the cities of Ahmedabad and Vadodara in the state of Gujarat, India. The 93.1 km (57.8 mi) long expressway reduces the travel time between the two cities from two and a half hours to an hour. It was declared as National Expressway 1 in 1986.

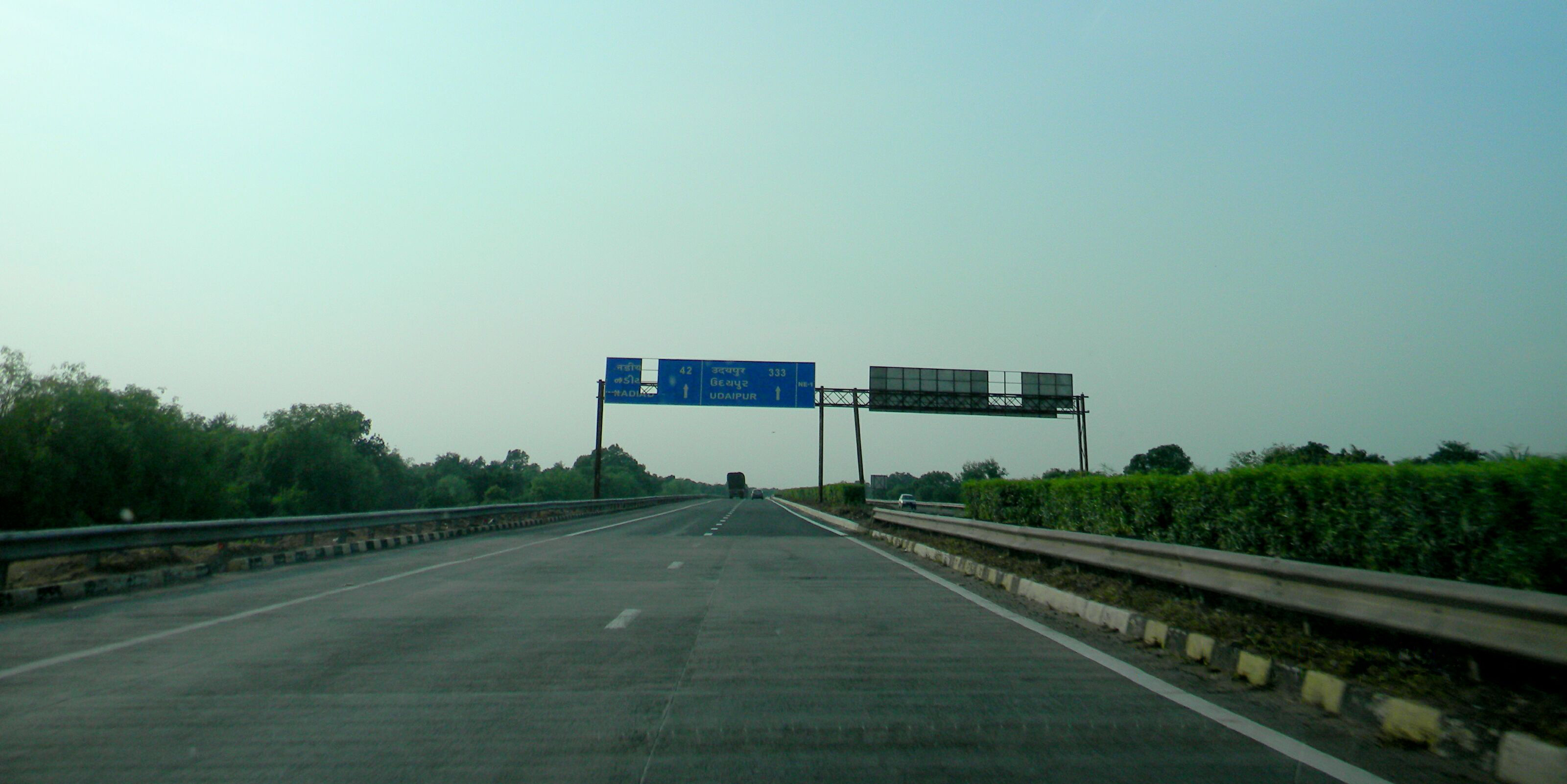
Expressway

The expressway has 2 lanes each side. The expressway opened in 2004. It has two exit loops at Nadiad / Kheda and Anand. In 2009, the National Highways Authority of India announced plans to upgrade the expressway to six lanes. Two-wheeler vehicles of all kinds are forbidden on the expressway. The expressway is fenced to prevent the entry of two wheelers and cattle, along with several underpasses and overbridges to allow vehicles to cross over.

== History ==
The expressway was built at a cost of ₹ 475 crore and inaugurated by the then Prime Minister of India, Atal Bihari Vajpayee. In 2009, the Government of Gujarat asked the Government of India to extend the expressway to Mumbai. In 2011, IRB Infra won a bid to upgrade the expressway from four lanes to six lanes with service lanes and collect toll. In 2013, it was announced that IRB Infra, which was also upgrading the stretch of the National Highway connecting Ahmedabad and Vadodara as part of the deal, would not collect toll till construction work was completed. The process of upgrading the expressway to six lanes is being done at a cost of ₹ 3300 crore.{{

== Toll rates ==
Toll will be charged at four points - at Ahmedabad, SP Ring Road Ahmedabad, Nadiad, Anand & Vadodara. A summary table of toll rates is as below:

Vehicle category	Ahmedabad to Vadodara	Nadiad to Vadodara	Nadiad to Ahmedabad	Ahmedabad to Anand	Anand to Vadodara
Two wheeler	Not allowed	Not allowed	Not allowed	Not allowed	Not allowed
Car/Jeep/Van	135	75	55	75	55

== Safety ==
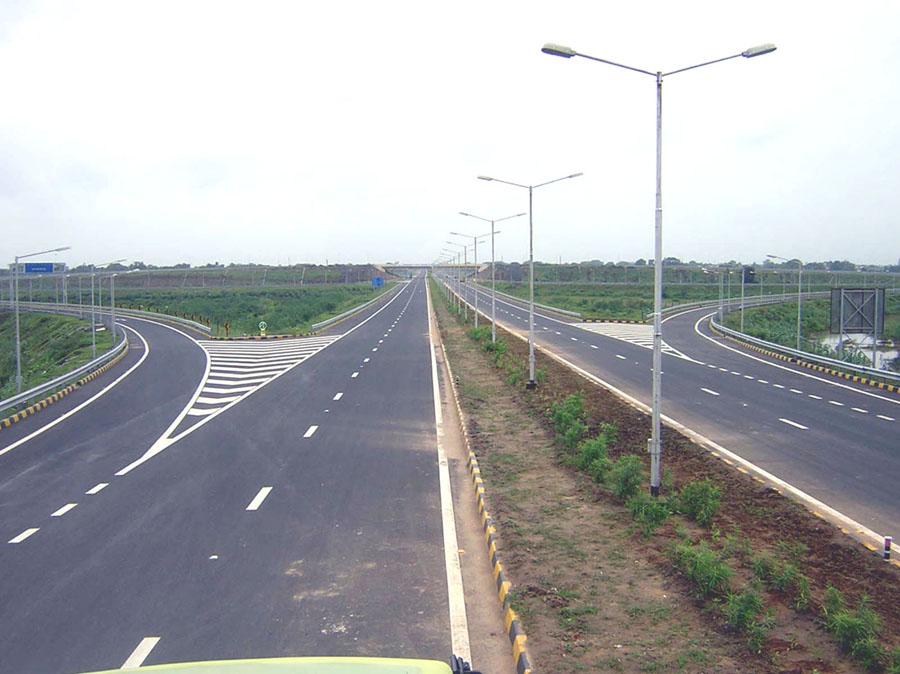
A view of Mahatma Gandhi Expressway dedicated to the Nation on 24 August 2004 by Union Minister T. R. Baalu at Vadodara

In 2004, it was reported that the road surface quality on certain stretches of the expressway was inferior due to the substandard quality of construction materials used. In 2005, it was reported that a major accident took place on the expressway, resulting in a pileup that involved nine vehicles due to fog. The Ahmedabad-Nadiad stretch is considered the most dangerous, with fatal accidents reported since the opening of the expressway. The expressway has been referred to as not accident-prone when compared to the Mumbai–Pune Expressway. GSRTC buses are known to travel slowly on the expressway due to speed limits set prior to the opening of the expressway.

== See also ==
- Expressways of India
- National Highways Development Project
- Golden Quadrilateral
- Delhi–Mumbai Expressway
- National Highway 8 (India, old numbering)
