= Chechat =

Town in Kota district, Rajasthan, India

Chechat is a 700-year-old town situated near the Takali River in Kota district, Rajasthan, India. Chechat represents a conglomerate of more than 36 surrounding villages, which are integrated into the economy of Chechat itself. Chechat has been destroyed three times between 1300 and 1900 AD. According to a census conducted in 2011, Chechat has a population of 11,690 and a literacy rate of 68%. The population is 53% male and 47% female.
