= Ena, Gujarat =

Ena
- village
- Location in Gujarat, India Ena (India)
- Coordinates: 21.17°N 72.83°E
- Country: India
- State: Gujarat
- District: Surat

Population
  - Total: 2,501

Languages
  - Official: Gujarati, Hindi
- Time zone: UTC+5:30 (IST)
- PIN: 394310
- Telephone code: 02622
- Vehicle registration: GJ-19
- Website: www.enavillage.in

Ena is a village in the Indian state of Gujarat located in Surat District, (Tahsil Palsana), near Bardoli.

== See also ==
- List of tourist attractions in Surat

Since 2022 Ena, Gujarat, is developed.
