= Vichumbe =

- Village
- Location within Maharashtra
- Coordinates: 18.9873°N 73.1364°E
- Country: India
- State: Maharashtra
- District: Raigad
- Nearest City: Mumbai, Navi Mumbai

Government
  - Body: Vichumbe Gram Panchayat
  - Sarpanch: Pramod Shantaram Bhingarkar

Population (2011)
  - Total: 6,332

Languages
  - Official: Marathi
- Time zone: UTC+5:30 (IST)
- PIN: 410206
- Telephone code: 022
- Vehicle registration: MH-46

Vichumbe is a village in Panvel Taluka situated in New Panvel, Raigad district in the Indian State of Maharashtra. The village of Vichumbe comes under the Cidco smart city NAINA project.

== Education ==
There are many Institutes nearby to this village

- Pillai Institute of Information Technology, Engineering, Media Studies & Research
- St. Josephs High School, New Panvel (EAST)
- Changu Kana Thakur School and Jr College
- DAV Public School
- DD Vispute College of Pharmacy (B.Pharm.)

== Hospitals ==
- Life Care Multi Speciality Hospital

== Transport ==
The nearest railway station is accessible through New Panvel called Panvel Railway Station.

Buses are available from Usarli Khurd to Panvel Railway Station (East).

Municipal Transport Corporations	Route No.	Route
NMMT	59	Mansarovar Railway Station to Vicumbe village New Panvel (East) via Khanda Colony
NMMT	51	Neelkant Vishwa to Railway Station Via Vichumbe.T
