= Delhi–Gurgaon Expressway =

Road in India

Delhi–Gurugram Expressway
- Delhi–Gurugram Expressway highlighted in red

Route information
- Length: 27.7 km (17.2 mi)
- Existed: 23 January 2008–present

Major junctions
- West end: Manesar (Gurugram)
- East end: Delhi

Location
- Country: India
- States: Delhi, Haryana
- Major cities: New Delhi, Gurugram

Highway system
- Roads in India; Expressways; National; State; Asian

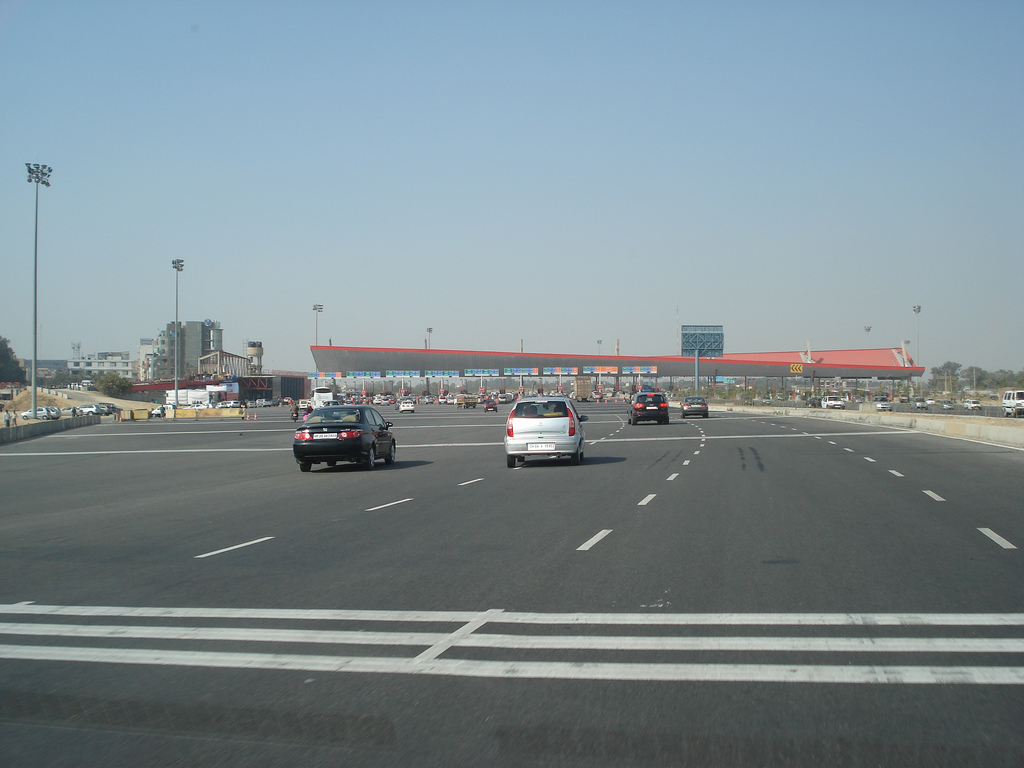
The 32-lane, now-removed toll gate at the Delhi–Gurgaon border was the largest in South Asia and the second largest in Asia.

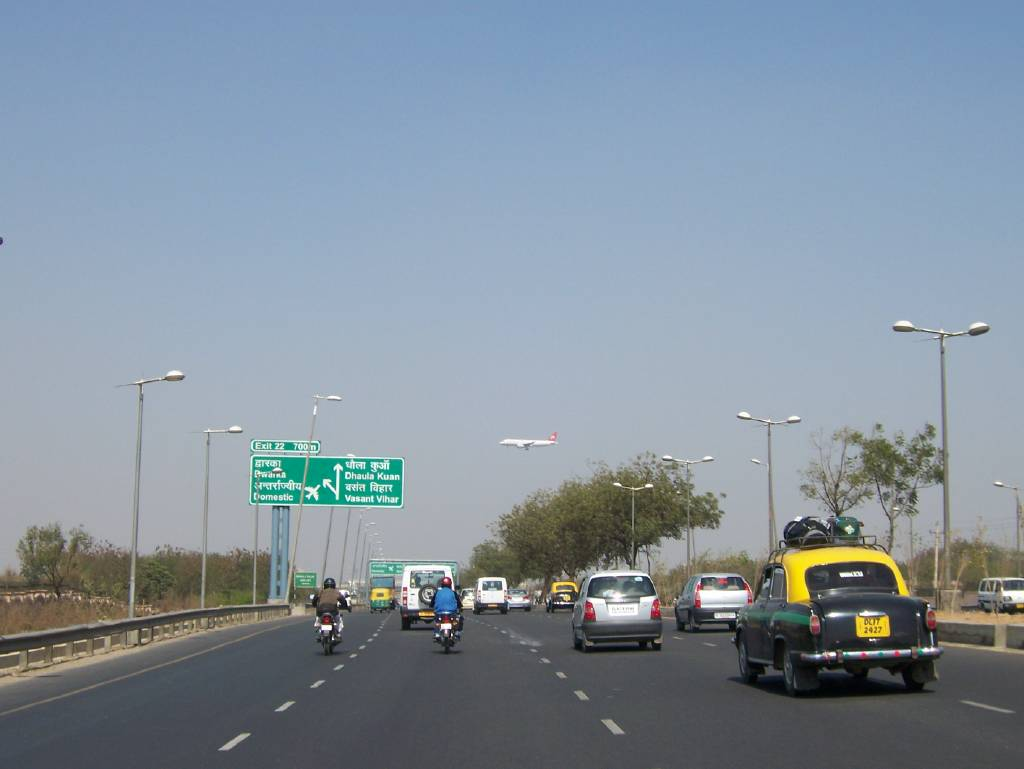
Expressway also connects both cities with the airport

The Delhi–Gurugram Expressway on NH-48 is a 27.7 km (17.2 mi) six to eight lane expressway connecting the national capital, Delhi and the Millennium city of Gurugram, Haryana in the National Capital Region of India. The expressway is a part of the Golden Quadrilateral project, which itself is a part of the National Highway Development Project. The ₹10 billion (US$103.8 million), 27.7 km (17.2 mi) brownfield expressway was opened in phases with the final section opening on 23 January 2008. This expressway is the busiest inter-city route in India and handles more than 180,000 PCUs daily. It starts at Dhaula Kuan in Delhi and terminates on the outskirts of Gurugram. Gurugram City is located at both sides of this Expressway.

== See also ==
- Expressways in India
- Highways passing from Delhi
- List of highways in Haryana
- National highways of India
- National Highways Development Project
