= Kolgaon, Maharashtra =

Village in Maharashtra

Kolgaon
- village
- Location in Maharashtra, India Kolgaon (India)
- Country: India
- Maharashtra: Maharashtra
- Ahmednagar: Ahmednagar district
- Founder: Nalage_Patil
- Named for: Kolgaon

Government
  - Type: Grampanchayat

Languages
  - Official: Marathi
- Time zone: UTC+5:30 (IST)
- 413728: 413728
- Website: www.abhinavhvac.com

Kolgaon is a village in the Shrigonda Taluka of Ahmednagar district in Maharashtra state, India.

== Demographics ==
Covering 763 hectares (1,890 acres) and comprising 245 households at the time of the 2011 census of India, Kolgaon had a population of 999. There were 502 males and 497 females, with 94 people being aged six or younger.
