= Saurabh Kalia =

Indian Army officer killed during the 1999 Kargil War

Captain Saurabh Kalia
- Kalia in 1998
- Born: 29 June 1976; Palampur, Himachal Pradesh, India
- Died: 9 June 1999 (aged 22); Kargil, Jammu and Kashmir (now Ladakh), India
- Military career
- Allegiance: Republic of India
- Branch: Indian Army
- Service years: 1998–1999
- Rank: Captain
- Service number: IC-58522
- Unit: 4 Jat
- Conflicts: Kargil War (POW) (executed)

Captain Saurabh Kalia (Punjabi pronunciation: [saurabha kālī'ā]; 29 June 1976 – 9 June 1999) was an officer of the Indian Army who was killed during the Kargil War while being held as a prisoner of war by the Pakistan Army. He and five soldiers in his patrol group were captured by Pakistani troops following a gunfight at the Line of Control and tortured prior to their execution.

== Early years ==
Saurabh Kalia was born on 29 June 1976 in Amritsar, Punjab, India, to Vijaya and N. K. Kalia. He attended D. A. V. Public School in Palampur, Himachal Pradesh, and then graduated from Himachal Pradesh Agricultural University in 1997 with a First-Class BSc-Med degree. He won various scholarships throughout his academic career.

== Military career ==
Saurabh Kalia was selected the Indian Military Academy in August 1997 through the Combined Defence Services Examination and was commissioned on 12 December 1998. He was posted to the 4th battalion Jat Regiment in the Kargil Sector, where he arrived in mid-January 1999 after reporting at the Jat Regimental Centre, Bareilly, on 31 December 1998.

== Kargil war ==
In the first two weeks of May 1999, several patrols were conducted in the Kaksar Langpa area of Kargil district to see if snow had receded enough for the area to be re-occupied. Kalia, who then held the rank of lieutenant, was the first Indian army officer to observe and report large-scale intrusion of Pakistani Army and foreign mercenaries on the Indian side of the Line of Control (LoC) at Kargil. He assumed guard of Bajrang Post at 13,000–14,000 feet to check infiltration in the Kaksar area.

On 15 May 1999, Kalia and five other soldiers – Sepoys Arjun Ram, Bhanwar Lal Bagaria, Bhika Ram, Moola Ram and Naresh Singh of the 4th Jat Regiment - were on a routine patrol of the Bajrang Post in the Kaksar sector in the Ladakh mountains when they engaged in a firefight with Pakistani forces across the LOC. The patrol out of ammunition, were encircled by a platoon of Pakistani army personnel and were captured before Indian reinforcements could reach them. Radio Skardu of Pakistan announced the capture.

Indian officials stated that Kalia and his men were held captive from May 15, 1999, to June 7, 1999, and were subjected to severe torture. They stated that the evidence of torture was apparent from the injuries on their bodies when they were handed over by the Pakistani Army on June 9, 1999. Post-mortem examinations conducted by India reported that the prisoners variously had cigarette burns, ear-drums pierced with hot rods, many broken teeth and bones, fractured skulls, eyes that had been punctured before being removed, cut lips, chipped noses, and amputated limbs and genitalia. According to the examinations, these injuries preceded the captives being shot dead in the head.

== Reaction ==
On 15 June 1999, India served Pakistan with a notice of breach of the Geneva Convention for the torture and killing of the prisoners of war. The Minister of External Affairs, Jaswant Singh, raised the issue with Sartaj Aziz, the Foreign Minister of Pakistan, seeking identification and punishment of those responsible, but Pakistan denied the charges of torture.

On 14 December 2012 Pakistan's Interior Minister, Rehman Malik, said that he had just recently heard of the case and that it was not known whether Kalia was killed with a Pakistani bullet or died because of the weather. He also said he would like to meet Kalia's father to find out what exactly had happened with his son. The same day, the Supreme Court of India ordered the Government of India to respond within ten weeks to a petition filed by Kalia's father.

== Efforts by family ==
Kalia's family has campaigned to have the acts declared a war crime by the United Nations and the people responsible punished in accordance with the Geneva Convention.

Kalia's father approached various national and international organisations to put pressure on Pakistan to identify and punish the persons allegedly responsible. As of 2004, Britain had responded by saying that it had unsuccessfully sought a full report from the Indian army, while Israel noted it had no diplomatic relations with Pakistan. Germany said it had no response to enquiries made to the Ministry of External Affairs, and Pakistan rejected the allegations.

The father stated in 2009 that he has failed to achieve his goals despite

shuttling between various government offices and organisations ... I am ashamed of being an Indian. The country has spineless leaders ... Though the then Atal Bihari Vajpayee-led National Democratic Alliance government at the Centre expressed concern over the heinous crime and promised to take up the issue at the international level, in all these years the issue got diluted.

An online petition started by the father to highlight the plight of the war victims was pursued by the MP Rajeev Chandrasekhar, who wrote to the External Affairs Minister and raised questions in Parliament as to why the Government had not taken up the case with the United Nations Human Rights Council (UNHRC). In response, Defence Minister A. K. Antony wrote to Kalia's parents in October 2013 that India was bound by the Simla Agreement, and any differences with Pakistan would be settled bilaterally.

"In order to declare a war crime, the Ministry of Defence needs to write to the Ministry of External Affairs, which then takes up the matter with the UNHRC. The council then refers the matter to the General Assembly, which can declare war crime. It then goes to the international court of justice (ICJ). It is the ministry of external affairs that did not follow up the case with the UN" said Colonel S. K. Aggarwal, a former Judge Advocate General officer. An affidavit filed by the External Affairs ministry in November 2013, said that "moving the ICJ is not a legally enforceable right" and that Pakistan may not permit India submitting a proposal to ICJ.

In 2012, Indian Army Chief General Bikram Singh reportedly supported the efforts of Kalia's father by writing to the Ministry of Defence and National Human Rights Commission conveying his concerns.

N. K. Kalia, along with Chandrasekhar, and the Flags of Honour Foundation, (an organisation dedicated to building ceaseless engagement between society and the families of killed soldiers), filed a petition on 7 December 2012 with Juan E. Méndez, UN Special Rapporteur on Torture, of the Office of High Commissioner of Human Rights in Geneva. The Indian External Affairs Ministry said it would look at the nature of the petition, as the UNHRC is an inter-state body and usually acts only in terms of initiatives taken by its member states.

Following the formation of the Narendra Modi ministry, the Supreme Court accepted a public interest litigation (PIL) case in September 2014, filed by N. K. Kalia and Sarwa Mitter, and asked the government to respond within six weeks. The Court wanted to know the stance of the new regime, and wondered why the government had not approached the International Court of Justice. The government's reply listed the actions taken by the previous government but did not state any proposals for the future. Instead, the government challenged the validity of the petition, saying that a PIL cannot seek action against a foreign country and that foreign policy is a government function.

== Memorials ==
In Himachal Pradesh, a memorial park in Palampur is named "Saurabh Van Vihar", a street as "Capt Saurabh Kalia Marg" and the locality as "Saurabh Nagar". A statue in his memory has been erected in Amritsar by Amritsar Working Journalists Association. A liquefied petroleum gas agency has been allotted by the Indian Oil Corporation to his parents.

== Bibliography ==
- Bisht, Rachna Singh (2019). Kargil: Untold Stories from the War. Penguin Books. ISBN 9-789-353-05591-2.
- Singh, Mohinder (2001). Punjab 2000: Political and Socio-economic Developments. Anamika Publishers & Distributors. ISBN 978-81-86565-90-2.
- Dwivedi, Diksha (2017). Letters from Kargil: The war through our soldier's eyes. Juggernaut Books. ISBN 978-93-86228-43-7.
