= Bhadas, Haryana =

Bhadas
- Village
- Location in Haryana, India Bhadas (India)
- Coordinates: 27°56′50″N 77°00′27″E
- Country: India
- State: Haryana
- District: Nuh
- Elevation: 187 m (614 ft)

Population (2011)
  - Total: 6,830

Languages
  - Official: Hindi, Haryanvi
- Time zone: UTC+5:30 (IST)
- PIN: 122108 Vehicle registration plate = HR-28
- ISO 3166 code: IN-HR
- Website: mewat.gov.in

Bhadas is a village, near Nuh city in Nuh district of Haryana state of India. It lies in the Mewat region of Delhi NCR and Delhi–Mumbai Industrial Corridor. It is located on the MDR135 to Hathin–Palwal and is also adjacent to the Delhi–Mumbai Expressway. It is 20 km from the Ferozepur Jhirka subdivision and 20 km from the Nuh city, district headquarter, 100 km far from national capital New Delhi and 355 km from state capital Chandigarh. It falls on the southern border of Haryana, near Alwar and Bharatpur Districts of Rajasthan. This lies in one of the most backward areas of the nation.

== History ==
Circa 150 BCE to 100 CE Shunga Empire or Kushan Empire era Hindu temple guard rail pillars were excavated from a filled well of Bhadas village as well as from Hathin, and they are now exhibited in the Haryana State Museum. The railing pillars have images of Yaksha and 3 mortises carved on them. These pillars from Bhadas and Hathin might have belonged to the same monument as the lens-shaped mortises on both have same size, same color of stone, same distance between each of three mortises craved on the pillars and same yaksha carvings. The yaksha on the Bhadas pillar stands on protome of a cloven hoofed animal, with raised now-broken right hand holding a flower and left hand on the hip holding the drapery. Roundel on the top of the pillar has a composite animal with protome of deer and hindquarters of makara superimposed over a blooming lotus.

== Ecology ==
Bhadas lake is an important wetland in the area that receives many migratory birds here in the winter season and other ponds around Nuh, including wood pigeon and stock dove that arrive in pairs.

== Demography ==
It had a population of 6,830 in 1,028 houses as per 2011 census of India.

== Education ==
- Al-Falah Model Senior Secondary School
- Govt School

== See also ==
- Gurgaon
- Bhiwadi
