= Khandala, Satara =

Khandala
- Town
- Interactive map of Khandala
- Location in Maharashtra, India
- Coordinates: 18.03°N 74.01°E
- Country: India
- State: Maharashtra
- District: Satara

Government
  - Body: Nagar Panchayat
- Elevation: 700 m (2,300 ft)

Population (2011)
  - Total: 6,832

Languages
  - Official: Marathi
- Time zone: UTC+5:30 (IST)
- Postal code: 412802
- Area code: 02169
- Vehicle registration: MH-11
- Website: www.satara.nic.in

Khandala is a town and taluka in the Satara district in the Indian state of Maharashtra.

== Geography ==
Khandala, Shirwal and Lonand are large towns in the taluka.

The Nira River flows from the northern border. Veer is the largest dam on the river. The southern border is covered by Mahadev Hills. Khandala Taluka is situated on the northern side of Satara district. Khandala is located approximately 55 km south of Pune. It is surrounded by the mountainous region of the Sahyādris. To the east of Khandala are the talukas of Phaltan and Baramati, to the west lie the taluka of Wai and Bhor, the northern border abuts Purandar Taluka in Pune district and the south border is shared with the Wai and Koregaon.

The headquarters of the taluka is the eponymous city.

== Demography ==
According to the 2011 Census, the population is 6,832 souls. 187 are Scheduled Tribes (STs) and 1,090 are Scheduled Castes (SC). The sex ratio is 3,301 females per 3,531 males. The literacy rate in the city is 91.12 per cent, 93.99 for males and 88.08 for females.

== Economy ==
Agriculture is the predominant occupation in Khandala taluka. According to the 2011 Census of India, out of 63,766 workers in the taluka, 27,673 were cultivators and 8,856 were agricultural labourers.

== Villages ==
Among the villages in the taluka are:

- Ahire
- Ajnuj
- Deoghar
- Golegaon
- Harali
- Javale
- Kanheri
- Khandala
- Khed
- Lonand
- Naigaon
- Padali
- Palashi
- Sangavi
- Shindewadi
- Shirwal
- Tondal
- Wathar
- Wing
