= National Highway 48 (India) =

National highway in India

National Highway 48
- Map of NH48 in red
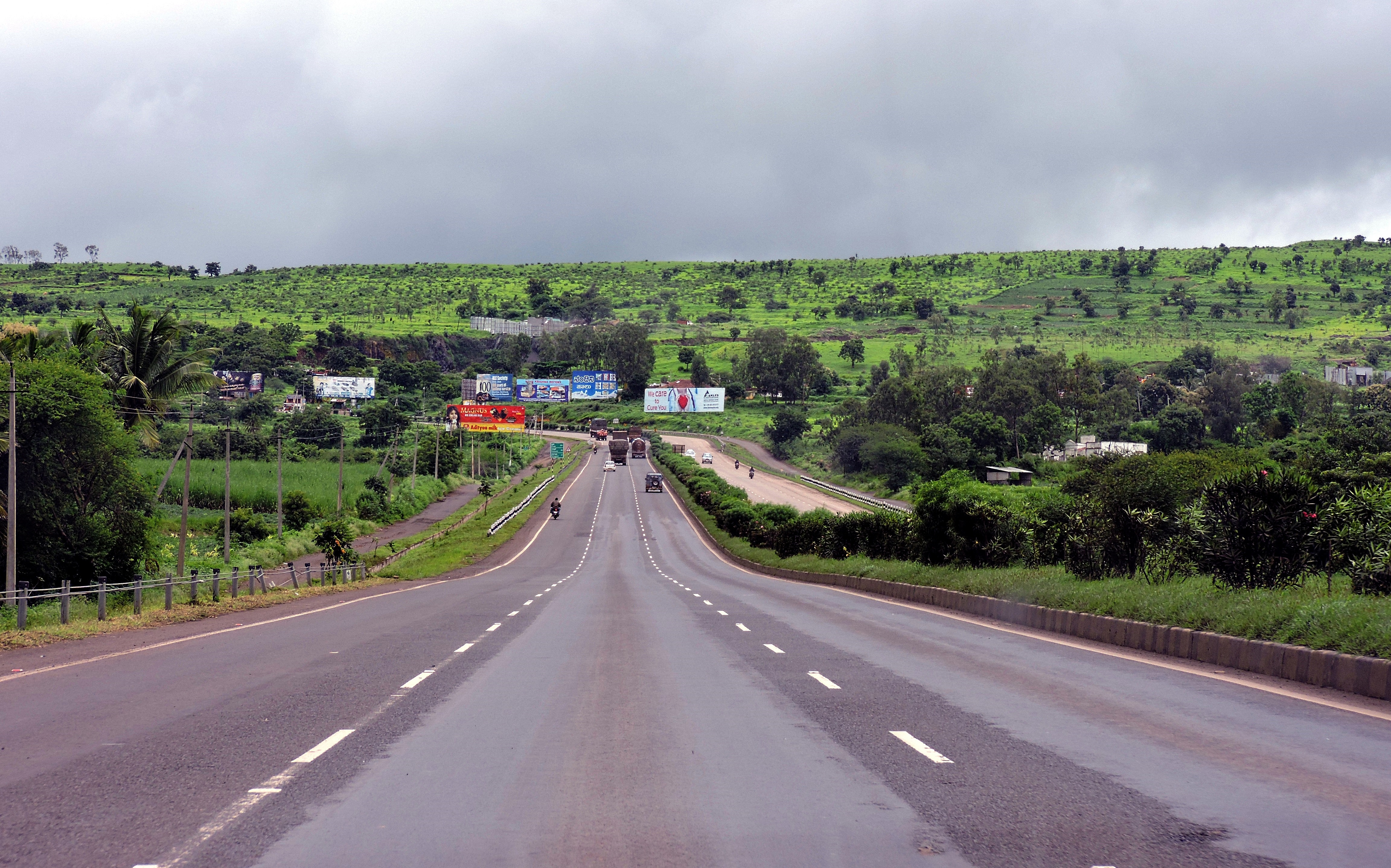
- A stretch of NH 48 in 2016

Route information
- Part of AH43 AH45 AH47
- Maintained by National Highways Authority of India
- Length: 2,807 km (1,744 mi)

Major junctions
- North end: Delhi
- List: NH 21 / NH 52 in Jaipur, Rajasthan; NH 27 from Chittorgarh to Udaipur, Rajasthan; NH 58 in Udaipur, Rajasthan; NH 68 in Prantij, Gujarat; NH 47 / NE 1 in Ahmedabad, Gujarat; NH 64 from Ahmedabad to Anand, Gujarat; NE 4 in Vasad, Gujarat; NE 1 in Vadodara, Gujarat; NH 53 in Palsana, Gujarat; NH 56 in Vapi, Gujarat; NH 66 in Panvel, Maharastra; NH 65 in Pimpri-Chinchwad, Maharastra; NH 60 in New Katraj Tunnel, Maharastra; NH 67 from Dharwad to Hubbali, Karnataka; NH 52 in Hubbali, Karnataka; NH 50 in Chitradurga, Karnataka; NH 69 in Sira, Karnataka; NH 73 in Tumakuru, Karnataka; NH 75 from Nelamangala to Bengaluru, Karnataka; NH 44 from Bengaluru, Karnataka to Krishnagiri, Tamil Nadu; NH 77 in Krishnagiri, Tamil Nadu; NH 38 / NH 75 in Vellore, Tamil Nadu; NH 40 in Walajapet, Tamil Nadu
- South end: Chennai

Location
- Country: India
- States: Delhi, Haryana, Rajasthan, Gujarat, Maharashtra, Karnataka, Tamil Nadu

Highway system
- Roads in India; Expressways; National; State; Asian
← NH 47	→ NH 49

National Highway 48 (NH 48) is a major National Highway of India that starts at Delhi and terminates at Chennai, traversing through seven states of India. It has a total length of 2807 km (1744 miles). NH 48 passes through the states of Delhi, Haryana, Rajasthan, Gujarat, Maharashtra, Karnataka, and Tamil Nadu. The stretch between Pune and Bengaluru was known as P.B. Road in olden days.

Its stretch from Delhi to Mumbai was earlier designated as NH 8, and the stretch between Mumbai and Chennai was designated, NH 4 before all the national highways were renumbered in the year 2010.

== Route ==
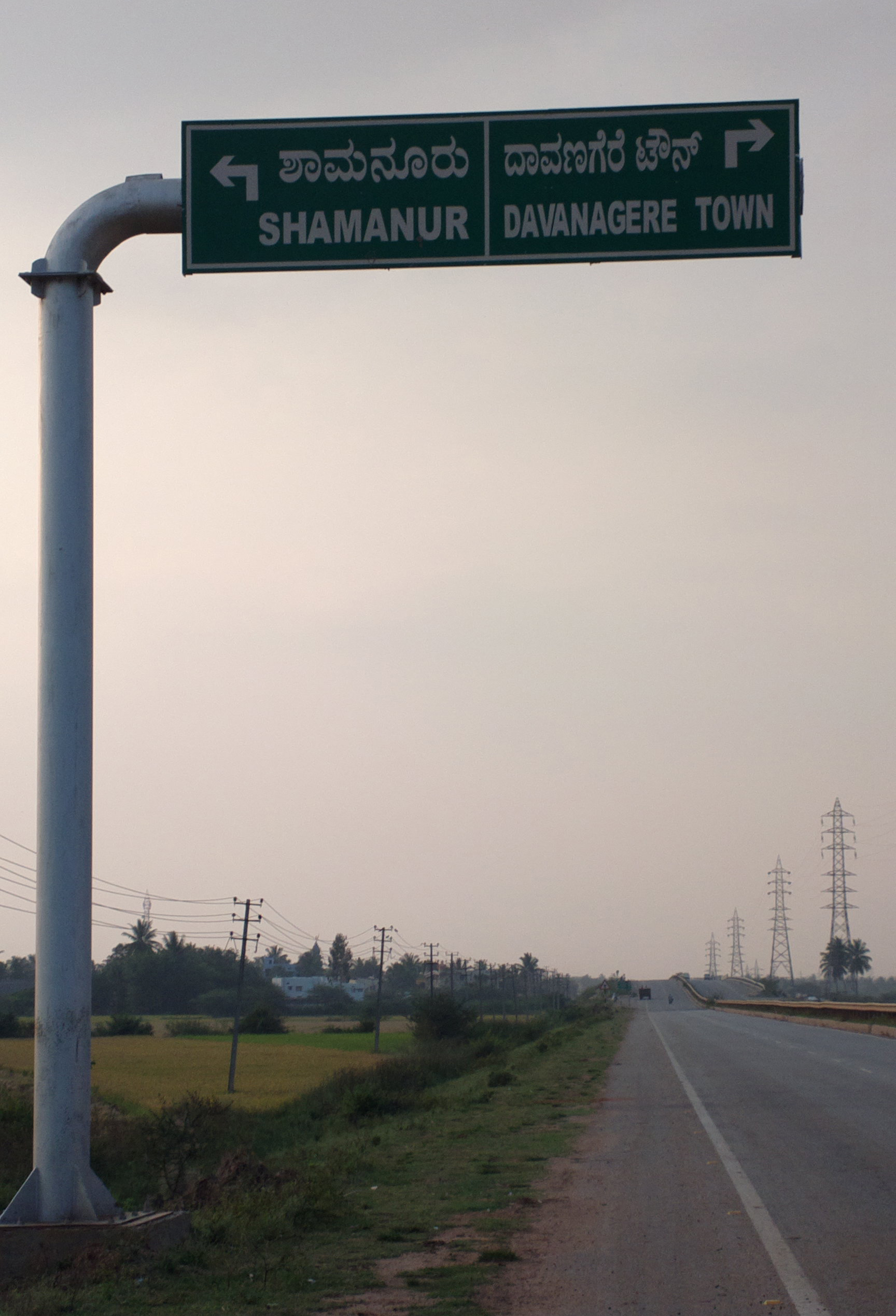
Signboard on National Highway 48, showing directions for Shamanur and Davangere City

The NH 48 passes through these important cities and towns that are given below:

- Delhi
- Gurugram
- Rewari
- Behror
- Kotputli
- Shahpura
- Jaipur
- Ajmer
- Bhilwara
- Udaipur
- Himatnagar
- Gandhinagar
- Ahmedabad
- Kheda
- Nadiad
- Anand
- Vadodara
- Bharuch
- Ankleshwar
- Surat
- Navsari
- Valsad
- Pardi
- Vapi
- Palghar
- Vasai-Virar
- Mumbai
- Thane
- Navi Mumbai
- Lonavala
- Pimpri Chinchwad
- Pune
- Satara
- Karad
- Uran Islampur
- Kolhapur
- Kagal
- Nipani
- Sankeshwar
- Belgaum
- Kittur
- Dharwad
- Hubli
- Haveri
- Ranebennuru
- Davanagere
- Chitradurga
- Hiriyur
- Sira
- Tumkur
- Dobbaspet
- Nelamangala
- Bangalore
- Electronic City
- Attibele
- Hosur
- Krishnagiri
- Vaniyambadi
- Ambur
- Pallikonda
- Vellore
- Arcot
- Ranipet
- Walajapet
- Kanchipuram
- Sriperumbudur
- Chennai

== Junction list ==
Delhi
Terminal at Delhi in Dhaula Kuan.

Haryana
NH 148A at IFFCO Chowk, Gurugram
NH 248A near Gurgaon
Western Peripheral Expressway near Manesar
NH 919 - Interchange near Dharuhera
NH 352 Interchange near Malhawas, Rewari

Rajasthan

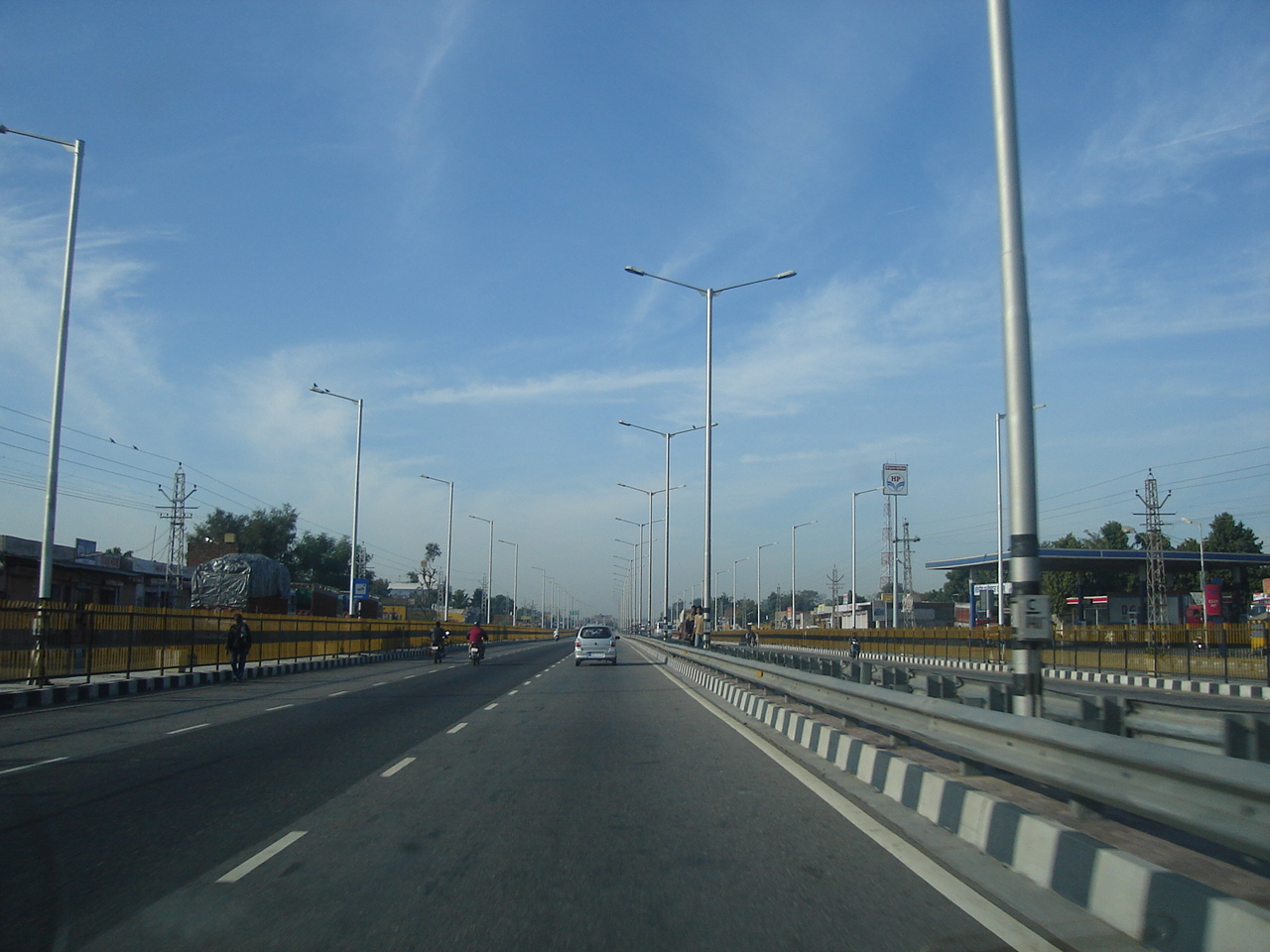
NH 48 in Rajasthan

NH 148B near Kotputli at Behror
NH 248A near Sahpura
NH 148 near Manoharpur
NH 248 near Chandwaji
NH 52 near Jaipur bypass
NH 21 near Hirapura
NH 248 near Hirapura
NH 448 interchange near Kishangarh
NH 448 interchange near Nasirabad
NH 148D near Gulabpura
NH 158 near Mandal
NH 758 near Bhilwara
NH 27 interchange near Chittorgarh
NH 162 near Bhatewar
NH 58 near Udaipur
NH 927A near Kherwara Chhaoni

Gujarat

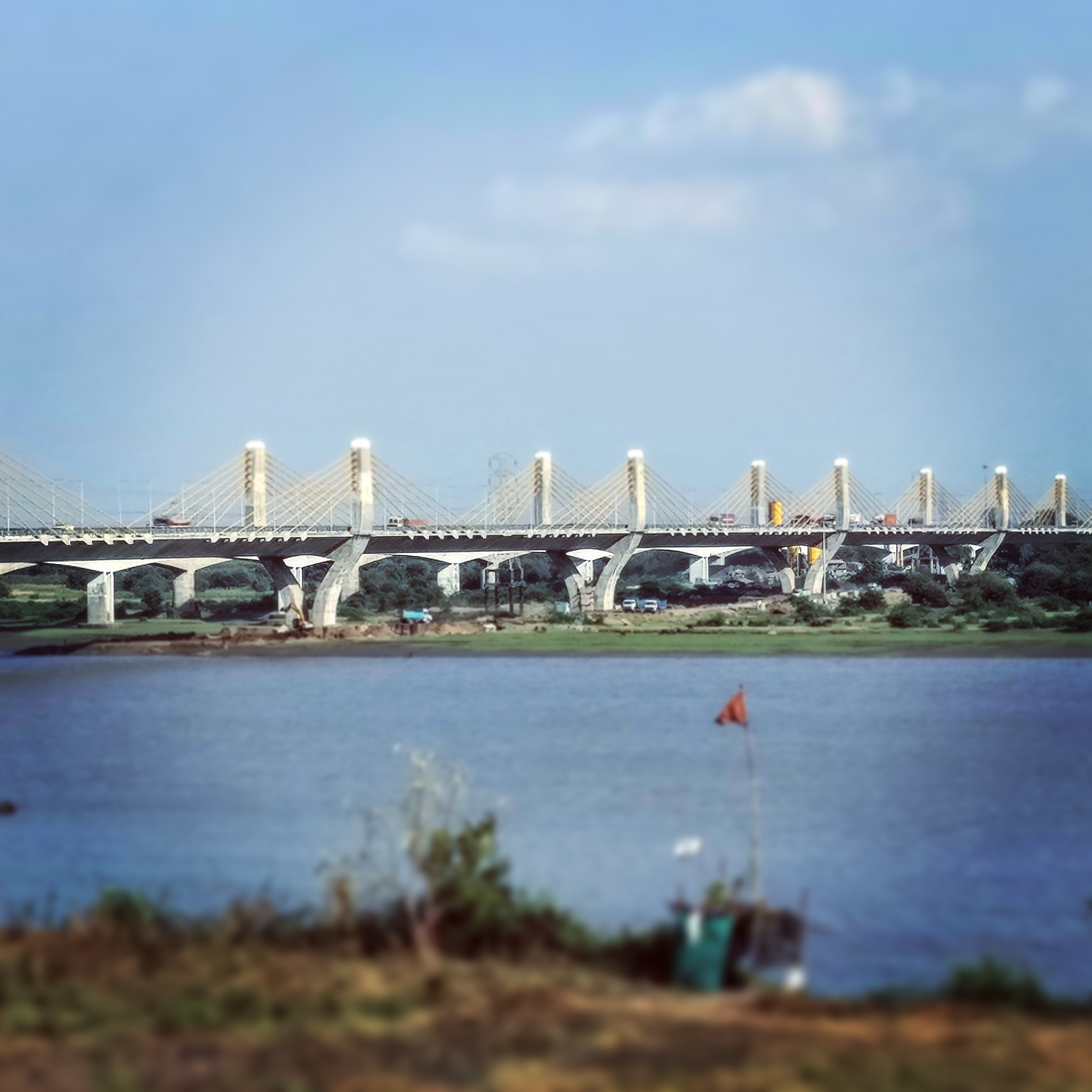
Cable bridge on NH48 across Narmada River near Bharuch

NH 58 near Himatnagar (58EXT)
NH 68 near Prantij (68EXT)
NH 147 near Chiloda
NH 47 near Kheda
NH 47 near Nadiad
NH 47 near Ahmedabad
NE 1 near Ahmedabad
NH 64 near Anand
NE 4 near Vasad
NH 148M near Vadodara
NE 4 near Kim
NH 53 near Palsana, Surat
NH 360 near Chikli
NH 848 near Pardi
NH 56 near Vapi
NH 848A near Bhilad

Maharashtra

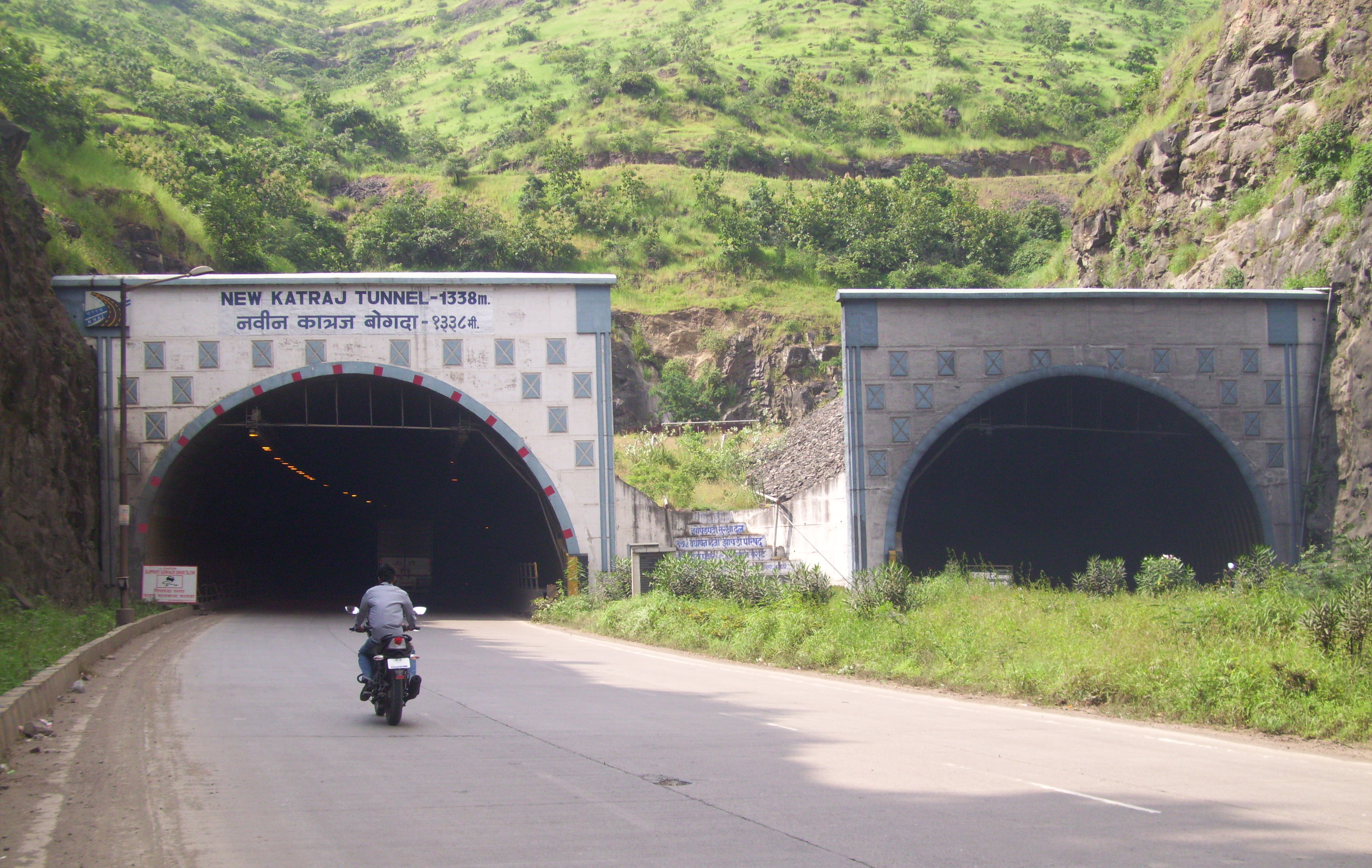
New Katraj Tunnel on NH48 near Pune

NH 160 near Thane
NH 848A near Talasari
NH 160A near Manor
NH 848 near Thane
Mumbai–Pune Expressway near Kalamboli
NH 548 near Kalamboli
NH 348 near Palspe
NH 66 near Panvel
Mumbai–Pune Expressway Interchange near Arivali village
NH 548A near Chowk Gaon
Mumbai–Pune Expressway Interchange near Kusgaon
NH 548D near Talegaon Dabhade
NH 65 near Dehu Road, Pune
Mumbai–Pune Expressway Dehu Road Interchange (Terminal point of MPE)
NH 753F near Pune
NH 548DD near Pune
NH 60 near New Katraj Tunnel, Pune
NH 965DD near Shirwal
NH 965D near Wade Phata, Satara
NH 548C near Satara
NH 166E near Karad
NH 166H near Peth Islampur
NH 166 near Kolhapur
NH 166G near Kolhapur

Karnataka

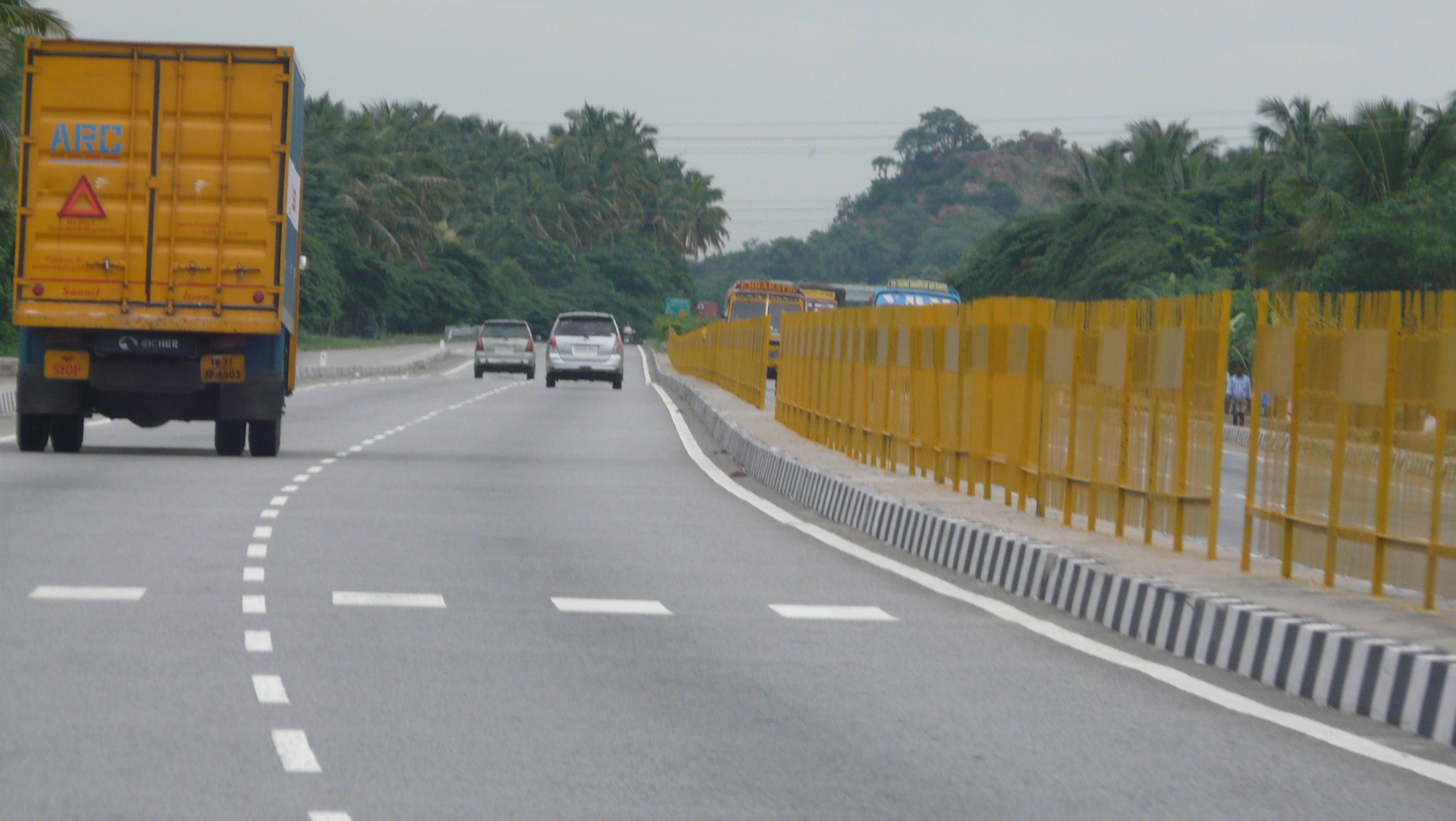
NH 48 in Karnataka

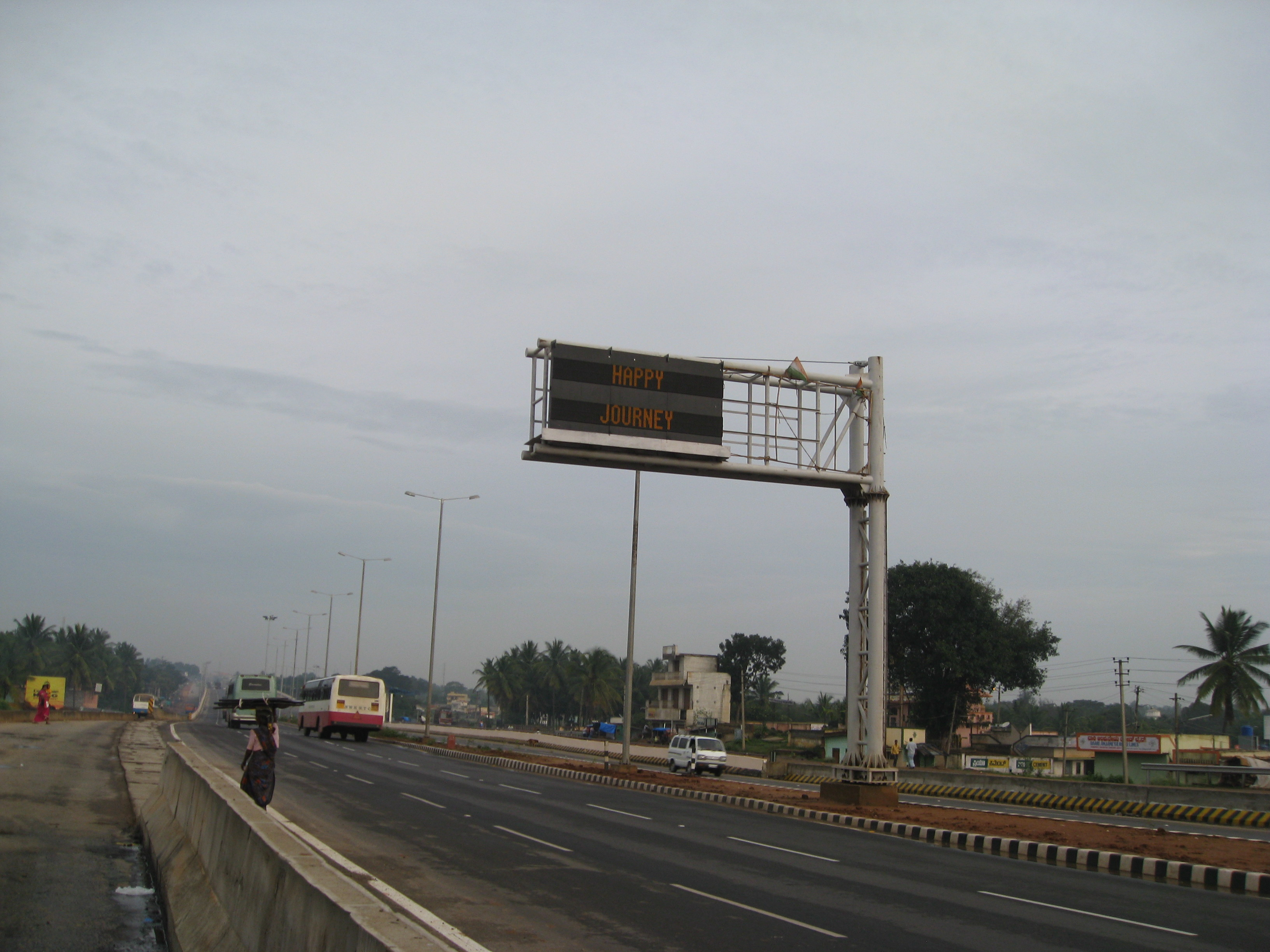
Variable message board at Nelamangala

NH 548H near Sankeshwar
NH 160 near Sankeshwar - Gotur
NH 748 near Belgaum
NH 67 near Dharwad
NH 67 Interchange near Hubli
NH 52 Interchange near Hubli
NH 766E near Haveri
NH 766C near Ranibennuru
NH 369 near Chitradurga
NH 50 near Chitradurga
NH 150A near Hiriyur
NH 69 near Sira
NH 544E near Sira
NH 73 near Tumkur
NH 648 near Dobbaspet
NH 75 near Nelamangala
NH 44 near Bangalore
NH 948 near Bangalore
NICE Road Interchange near Electronic City

Tamil Nadu

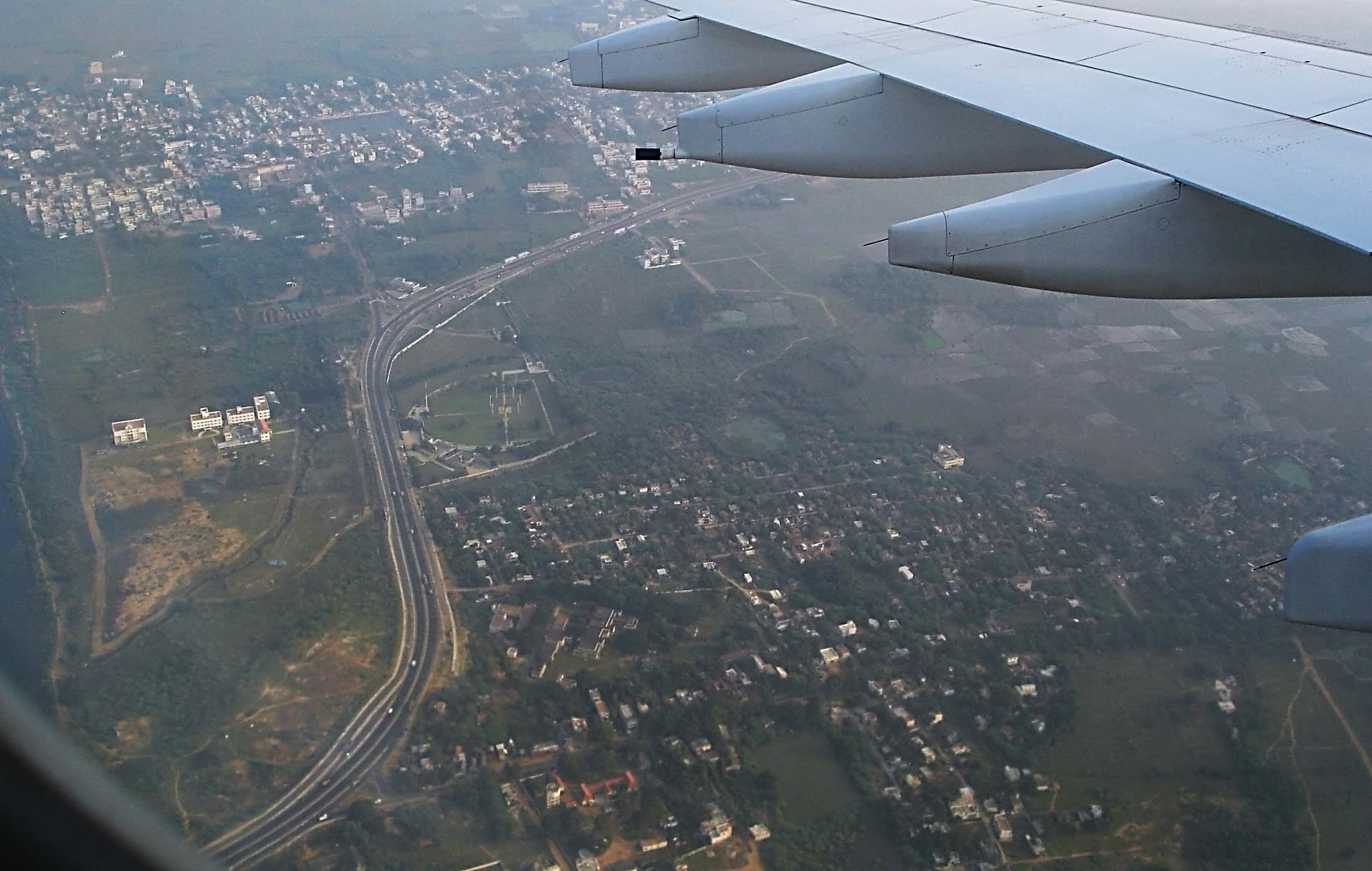
Aerial view of NH48 at Sriperumbudur

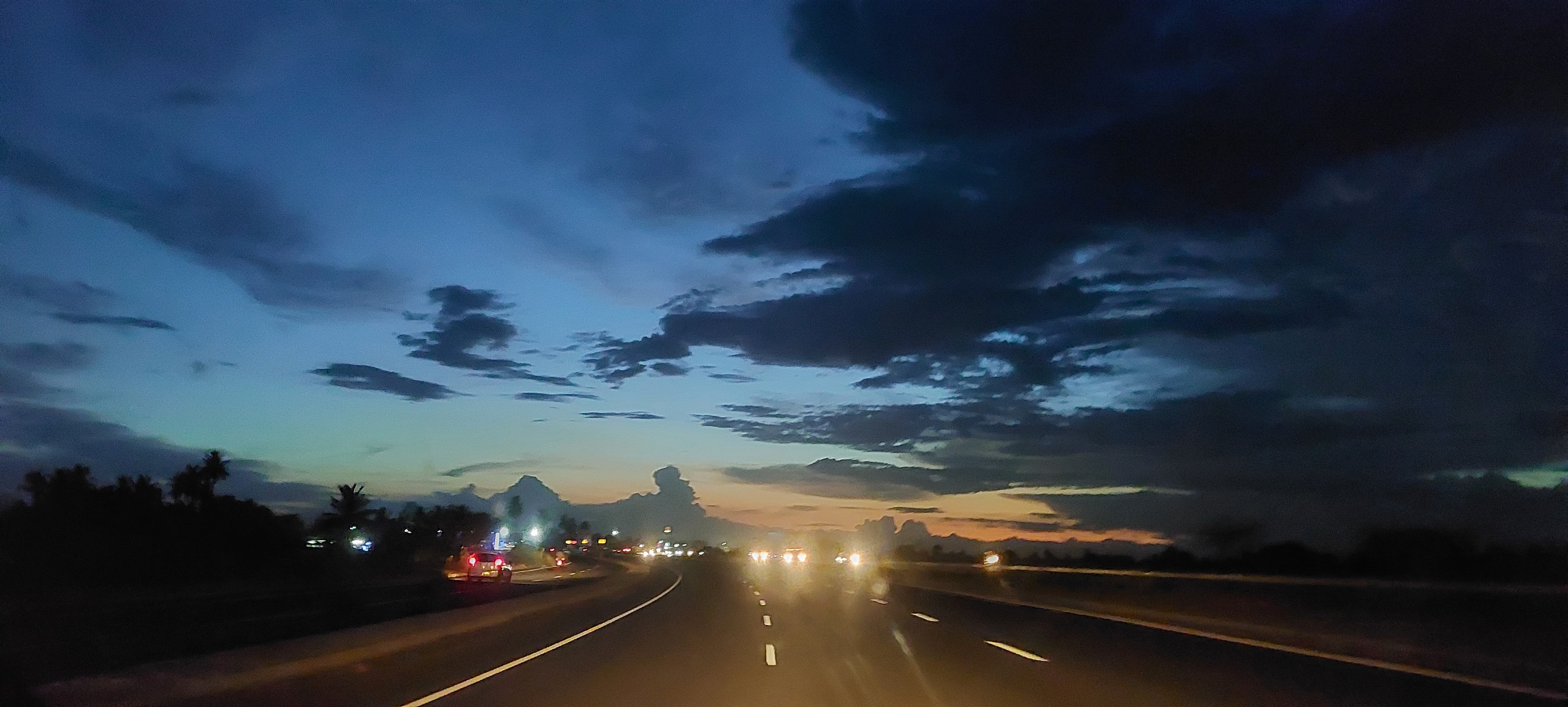
Section of NH 48 near Kanchipuram during dusk

NH 844 near Hosur
NH 77 near Krishnagiri
NH 179A near Vaniyambadi
NH 38 near Pallikonda
NH 75 near Vellore
NH 40 near Ranipet
NH 132B near Kanchipuram
NH 16 Terminal near Chennai

== Map with spur routes ==
Map of NH48 in red, spur routes in blue

== See also ==
- List of national highways in India
- List of national highways in India by state
- National Highways Development Project
- National Highway 169 (India)
- National Highway 66 (India)
