= National Highway 162A (India) =

National highway in India

National Highway 162A
- Map of the National Highway in red

Route information
- Length: 50 km (31 mi)

Major junctions
- South end: Mavli
- North end: Khandel

Location
- Country: India
- States: Rajasthan

Highway system
- Roads in India; Expressways; National; State; Asian
← NH 162	→ NH 758

National Highway 162A, commonly called NH 162A is a national highway in India. It is a spur road of National Highway 162. NH-162A traverses the state of Rajasthan in India.

== Route ==
Mavli - Fatehnagar - Dariba - Railmagra - Khandel.

== Junctions ==
NH 162 Terminal near Mavli.
NH 758 Terminal near Khandel.

== See also ==
- List of national highways in India
- List of national highways in India by state
