= Kedgaon =

Kedgaon may refer to one of the following places:

- Kedgaon, Ahmednagar district, Maharashtra State, India
- Kedgaon, Pune district, Maharashtra State
- Kedgaon, Solapur district, Maharashtra State
