= National Highway 448 (India) =

National highway in India

National Highway 448
- Map of National Highway 448 in red

Route information
- Auxiliary route of NH 48
- Length: 57 km (35 mi)

Major junctions
- North end: NH 48 in Kishangarh
- NH 58 in Ajmer
- South end: NH 48 in Nasirabad

Location
- Country: India
- States: Rajasthan
- Primary destinations: Ajmer

Highway system
- Roads in India; Expressways; National; State; Asian
← NH 348BB	→ NH 548

National Highway 448, commonly called NH 448 is a national highway in India. It is a spur road of National Highway 48. NH 448 traverses the state of Rajasthan in India. It connects Ajmer to Kishangarh Airport, and to NH 48.

== Route ==
Kishangarh – Ajmer – Nasirabad.

== See also ==
- List of national highways in India
- List of national highways in India by state
