= Katraj =

Neighbourhood in Pune

- Neighbourhood
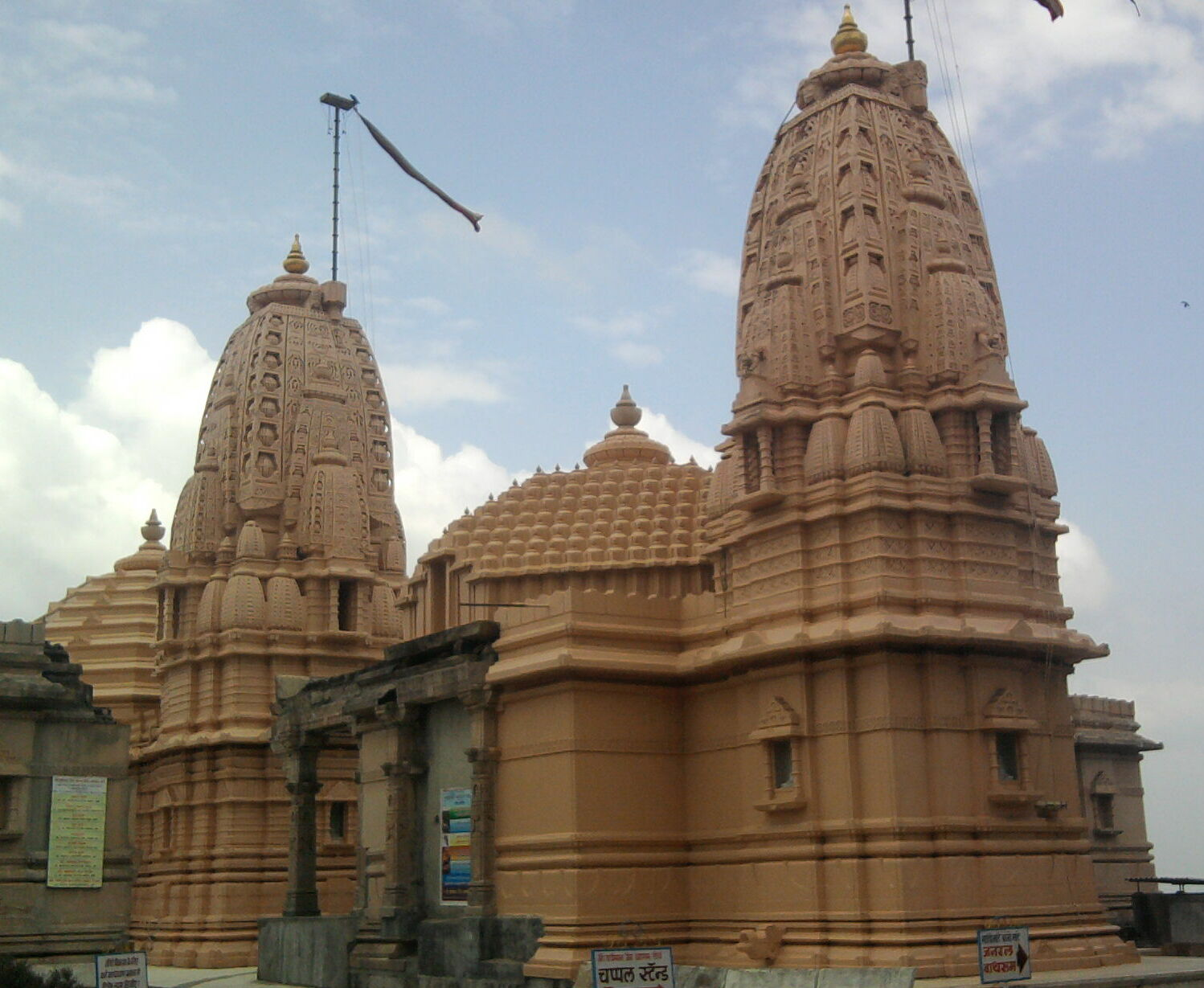
- Katraj Jain temple

- Location within Maharashtra
- Coordinates: 18°27′13″N 73°51′42″E
- Country: INDIA
- State: Maharashtra
- District: Pune

Government
  - Body: Pune Municipal Corporation

Languages
  - Official: Marathi
- Time zone: UTC+5:30 (IST)
- PIN: 411 046
- Telephone code: +91-20
- Vehicle registration: MH-12

Katraj is suburb of Pune in the Indian state of Maharashtra, and within the jurisdiction of Pune Municipal Corporation. Katraj is famous for its Peshwa-era (18th century) lake that supplied water to the city during that period. The village lies at the foot of the Katraj Ghat or mountain pass on the main National Highway 4 connecting Pune with places south of the city, such as Kolhapur and Bangalore. In recent decades area surrounding the lake and the village of Katraj became part the City of Pune. The former rural area is now surrounded by residential complexes. The lakeside hosts the Rajiv Gandhi Zoological Park. Bharati Vidyapeeth, a deemed university, has its main campus here. A large Jain temple was built here in late 20th century.

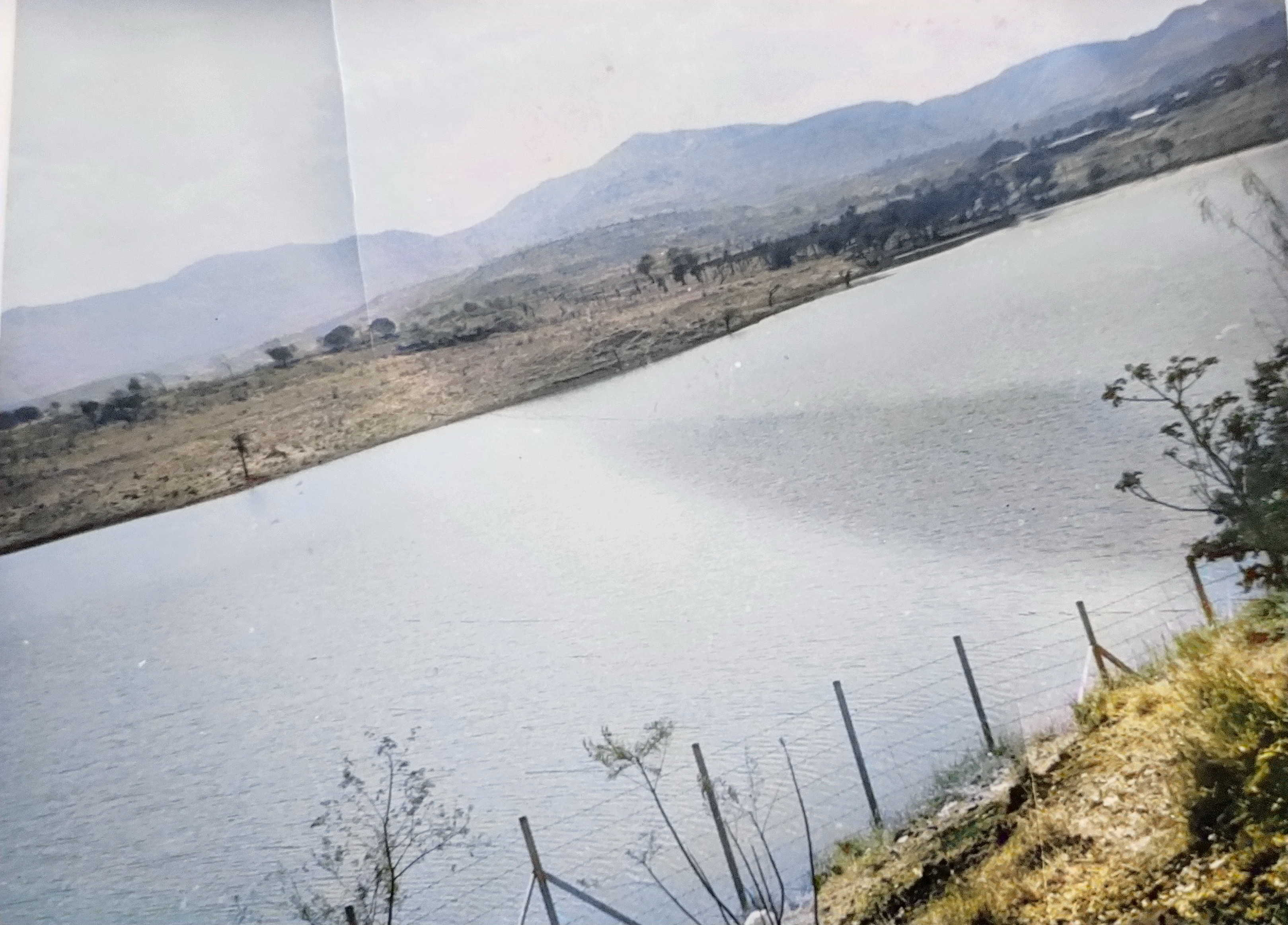
Katraj lake and surrounding Mountain range in 1976

== Katraj Jain temple ==
The Jain temple was built in late 20th century and is one of the major Śvetāmbara Jain pilgrimages in Pune. This temple was constructed under direction of Acharya Daulatsagarsuri. This temple houses copper-plate prints of the Śvetāmbara canon on its walls and is one of the several Aagam mandirs. An image of Padmavati, who is popular among devotees, was installed inside the temple in 1999. Temple has rich architecture. Temple also has a dharamshala with modern facilities along with bhojanalya.

== See also ==
- New Katraj Tunnel
