= National Highway 158 (India) =

National Highway in India

National Highway 158
- Map of the National Highway in red

Route information
- Length: 135 km (84 mi)

Major junctions
- North end: Merta City
- South end: Mandal

Location
- Country: India
- States: Rajasthan

Highway system
- Roads in India; Expressways; National; State; Asian
← NH 58	→ NH 48

National Highway 158, commonly referred to as NH 158 is a national highway in India. It is a spur road of National Highway 58. NH-158 traverses the state of Rajasthan in India.

== Route ==
Merta City, Lambia, Ras, Beawar, Badnor, Asind, Mandal.

== Junctions ==
NH 58 Terminal near Merta City.
NH 458 near Merta and Lambia.
NH 25 and
NH 58 near Beawar.
NH 148 near Asind.
NH 48 Terminal near Mandal, Bhilwara.

== See also ==
- List of national highways in India
- List of national highways in India by state
