= NH 123 =

NH 123 may refer to:

- National Highway 123 (India)
- New Hampshire Route 123, United States
