= National Highway 148M (India) =

National Highway in India

National Highway 148M
- Map of National Highway 148M in red

Route information
- Auxiliary route of NH 48
- Length: 56 km (35 mi)

Major junctions
- South end: NH 48 in Vadodara
- NE 4 in Vadodara; NH 64 in Mahuvad
- North end: SH 11 in Anklav

Location
- Country: India
- States: Gujarat

Highway system
- Roads in India; Expressways; National; State; Asian
← NH 148D	→ NH 148N

National Highway 148M, commonly referred to as NH 148M is a national highway in India. It is a secondary route of National Highway 48. NH-148M runs in the state of Gujarat in India.

== Route ==
NH148M connects Vadodara, Bhaili, Samiyala, Laxmipura, Sangma, Padra, Dabhasa, Mahuvad, Kinkhlod, Pakiza Society in Borsad, Nisraya, Alarsa, Kosindra Indiranagar and Anklav in the state of Gujarat.

== See also ==
- List of national highways in India
- List of national highways in India by state
