= National Highway 166H (India) =

National Highway in India

National Highway 166H
- Map of National Highway 166H in red

Route information
- Auxiliary route of NH 66
- Length: 55 km (34 mi)

Major junctions
- South end: Sangli
- North end: Peth Naka

Location
- Country: India
- States: Maharashtra

Highway system
- Roads in India; Expressways; National; State; Asian
← NH 166	→ NH 48

National Highway 166H, commonly referred to as NH 166H is a national highway in India. It is a secondary route of National Highway 66. NH-166H runs in the state of Maharashtra in India.

== Route ==
NH 166H connects Sangli city and Peth Naka in the state of Maharashtra.

Miraj - Sangli - Ashta - Islampur - Peth Naka

== Junctions ==
- NH 166 Terminal near Sangli.
  NH 160 near Miraj.
  NH 48 Terminal near Peth Naka.

== See also ==
- List of national highways in India
- List of national highways in India by state
