= National Highway 248A (India) =

National highway in India

National Highway 248A
- Map of National Highway 248A in red

Route information
- Auxiliary route of NH 48
- Length: 213 km (132 mi)

Major junctions
- South end: Sahpura
- North end: Gurgaon

Location
- Country: India
- States: Rajasthan, Haryana

Highway system
- Roads in India; Expressways; National; State; Asian
| ← NH 248 | → NH 248BB |

National Highway 248A, commonly called NH 248A is a national highway in India. It is a spur road of National Highway 48. NH-248A traverses the states of Rajasthan and Haryana in India.

== Route ==
Sahpura - Alwar - Ramgarh - Nuh - Gurgaon.

== Junctions ==
NH 48 Terminal near Sahpura.
NE 4 near Sohna.
KMP Expressway T interchange, south-west of Sohna.
NH 919 near Sohna.
NH 48 Terminal near Gurgaon.

== See also ==
- List of national highways in India
- List of national highways in India by state
