= National Highway 348B (India) =

National Highway in India

National Highway 348B
- Map of National Highway 348B in red

Route information
- Auxiliary route of NH 48
- Length: 20 km (12 mi)

Major junctions
- North end: Ulwe
- South end: Raigad (Barapada)

Location
- Country: India
- States: Maharashtra

Highway system
- Roads in India; Expressways; National; State; Asian
← NH 348	→ NH 66

National Highway 348B, commonly referred to as NH 348B is a national highway in India. It is a secondary route of National Highway 48. NH-348B runs in the state of Maharashtra in India.

== Route ==
NH348B connects Near Ulwe, Padeghar, Jambhulpada, Kauli Belodak, Chirner, Sai and Raigad (Barapada) in the state of Maharashtra.

== Junctions ==
NH 348 Terminal near Ulwe.
NH 348BB near Chirner
NH 66 Terminal near Raigad(Barapada).

== See also ==
- List of national highways in India
- List of national highways in India by state
