= NH 11C =

NH 11C may refer to:

- National Highway 11C (India)
- New Hampshire Route 11C, United States
