= National Highway 58 (India) =

National highway in India

National Highway 58
- Map of NH 58 in red

Route information
- Length: 679 km (422 mi)

Major junctions
- North end: NH 11 / NH 52 in Fatehpur
- List: NH 458 in Ladnu; NH 158 / NH 458 in Merta; NH 448 in Ajmer; NH 25 / NH 158 in Beawar; NH 458 in Jass Khera; NH 148D in Bhim; NH 758 in Rajsamand; NH 162 in Nathdwara; NH 27 / NH 48 in Udaipur; NH 927A in Garanwas
- South end: NH 27 in Palanpur

Location
- Country: India
- States: Rajasthan, Gujarat

Highway system
- Roads in India; Expressways; National; State; Asian
← NH 57	→ NH 59

National Highway 58 (NH 58) is a National Highway in India connecting Fatehpur and Udaipur in the state of Rajasthan. NH58 route is extended from Udaipur to Palanpur in Gujarat.

== Route ==
=== Rajasthan ===
Fatehpur - Ladnun - Nagaur - Merta City - Ajmer - Beawar - Deogarh - Udaipur - Jhadol - Gujarat border.

=== Gujarat ===
Rajasthan Border - Idar - Vadali - Dharoi - Satlasana - Palanpur.

== Map with spur routes ==
Map of NH58 in red, spur routes in blue

== See also ==
- List of national highways in India
- List of national highways in India by state
