= National Highway 848 (India) =

National highway in India

National Highway 848
- Map of the National Highway in red

Route information
- Length: 273.6 km (170.0 mi)

Major junctions
- South end: Thane
- North end: Pardi

Location
- Country: India
- States: Maharashtra, Gujarat

Highway system
- Roads in India; Expressways; National; State; Asian
← NH 48	→ NH 48

National Highway 848, commonly called NH 848 is a national highway in India. It is a spur road of National Highway 48. NH-848 traverses the states of Maharashtra and Gujarat in India.

== Route ==
Maharashtra

Thane - Nashik - Peint - Gujarat border.

Gujarat

Maharashtra border - Kaprada - Pardi.

== Junctions ==
NH 48 Terminal near Thane.
NH 48 Terminal near Pardi.

== Upgradation ==
The MORTH granted Rs 39 crore for widening of 15 km stretch of the Nashik-Peth-Gujarat border of NH848 in 2014.

== See also ==
- List of national highways in India
- List of national highways in India by state
