= National Highway 21 (India) =

National highway in India

National Highway 21
- Map of National Highway 21 in red
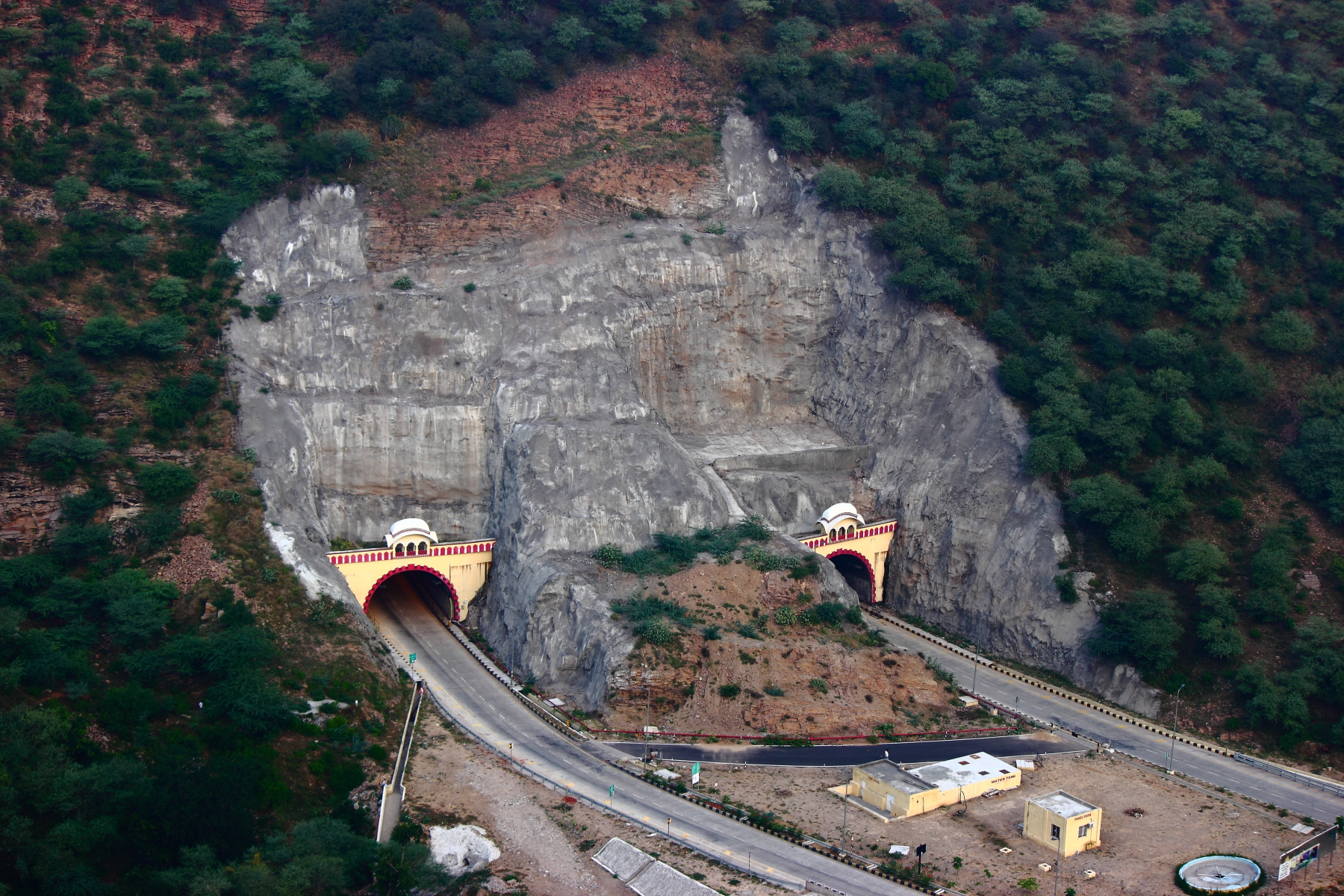
- Ghat ki Guni Tunnel near Jaipur

Route information
- Length: 502 km (312 mi)

Major junctions
- West end: NH 48 in Jaipur, Rajasthan
- List: NH 52 / NH 148C / NH 248 in Jaipur, Rajasthan; NH 148 in Dausa, Rajasthan; NE 4 in Bhadarej, Rajasthan; NH 921 in Mahwa, Rajasthan; NH 123 in Nagla Uncha, Rajasthan; NH 19 / NH 44 / NH 509 in Agra, Uttar Pradesh; NH 321G in Jalesar, Uttar Pradesh; NH 34 / NH 530B in Sikandra Rao, Uttar Pradesh; NE 10 in Binawar, Uttar Pradesh
- East end: NH 30 / NH 530 in Bareilly, Uttar Pradesh

Location
- Country: India
- States: Rajasthan, Uttar Pradesh
- Primary destinations: Jaipur, Dausa, Bharatpur, Agra, Kasganj, Ujhani, Budaun, Bareilly

Highway system
- Roads in India; Expressways; National; State; Asian
← NH 48	→ NH 30

National Highway 21 (NH 21) is a primary national highway in India. This highway connects Jaipur in Rajasthan to Agra and Bareilly in Uttar Pradesh This national highway is 502 km (312 mi) long starting from Patrika Chowk in Jaipur till its end at Lalpur Chauraha in Bareilly.

== Route ==
- Jaipur to Bharatpur
- Bharatpur to Agra
- Agra to Sikandra Rao
- Sikandra Rao to Budaun
- Budaun to Bareilly

The Jaipur to Agra section of NH 21 was known as NH 11 before renumbering of all national highways by the Ministry of Road Transport and Highways in 2010.

== See also ==
- List of national highways in India
- List of national highways in India by state
