= Ajnuj =

Village in Maharashtra

- Village
- Location in Maharashtra, India Ajnuj (India)
- Coordinates: 18°03′06″N 74°00′09″E
- Country: India
- State: Maharashtra
- District: Satara

Government
  - Body: Ajnuj Grampanchayat
- Elevation: 710 m (2,330 ft)

Population (2011)
  - Total: 1,198

Languages
  - Official: Marathi
- Time zone: UTC+5:30 (IST)
- Postal code: 412802
- Area code: 02169
- Vehicle registration: MH-11
- Website: www.satara.nic.in

Ajnuj is a village that is situated west of the taluka city of Khandala in the Satara district of Maharashtra, India, on the Khandala-Bhor Road. The MSRTC Depot of Khandala is in Ajnuj.Farmin

Agriculture in Ajnuj mainly includes crops such as sugarcane, wheat, and vegetables, which are common crops in the Satara region.

Janubai is village deity. Mahadev mandir located on top of hill just next to village is most scenic place in Ajnuj. Mesmerizing views of surrounding areas can be experienced from here.

Western ghats are located On south and west side of village.this village is rich in flaura and fauna.
