= National Highway 921 (India) =

National Highway in India

National Highway 921
- Map of National Highway 921 in red

Route information
- Auxiliary route of NH 21
- Length: 48 km (30 mi)

Major junctions
- South end: Mahwa
- North end: Rajgarh

Location
- Country: India
- States: Rajasthan

Highway system
- Roads in India; Expressways; National; State; Asian
← NH 21	→ NH 921

National Highway 921, commonly referred to as NH 921 is a national highway in India. It is a spur road of National Highway 21. NH-921 runs in the state of Rajasthan in India.

== Route ==
NH921 connects Mahwa, Mandawar, Garhi Sawai Ram, Pinan, Machadi Mode, Kandholi Bypass, Rajgarh and Rajgarh in the state of Rajasthan.

== Junctions ==
NH 21 Terminal near Mahwa.

== See also ==
- List of national highways in India
- List of national highways in India by state
