= National Highway 148N (India) =

National highway in India

National Highway 148N
- NH 148N in red

Route information
- Length: 59.625 km (37.049 mi)

Major junctions
- North end: NH 23 in Lalsot
- South end: NH 552 in at Sawai Madhopur

Location
- Country: India
- States: Rajasthan

Highway system
- Roads in India; Expressways; National; State; Asian
← NH 148M	→ NH 149

National Highway 148N (NH 148N) is a National Highway in India.
