= National Highway 166G (India) =

National Highway in India

National Highway 166G
- Map of National Highway 166G in red

Route information
- Auxiliary route of NH 66
- Length: 84 km (52 mi)

Major junctions
- West end: Talera
- East end: Kolhapur

Location
- Country: India
- States: Maharashtra

Highway system
- Roads in India; Expressways; National; State; Asian
← NH 66	→ NH 48

National Highway 166G, commonly referred to as NH 166G is a national highway in India. It is a secondary route of National Highway 66. NH-166G runs in the state of Maharashtra in India.

== Route ==
NH166G connects Talera, Vaibhavawadi, Gaganbawada (Bavda), Kale and Kolhapur in the state of Maharashtra.

== Junctions ==
NH 66 Terminal near Talera.
NH 48 Terminal near Kolhapur.

== See also ==
- List of national highways in India
- List of national highways in India by state
