= Katraj Ghat =

Mountain pass in Pune, Maharashtra, India

- Interactive map of Katraj Ghat

Third Approach
- Location: Maharashtra, India
- Range: Sinhagad-Bhuleshwar spur of Sahyadri Mountains

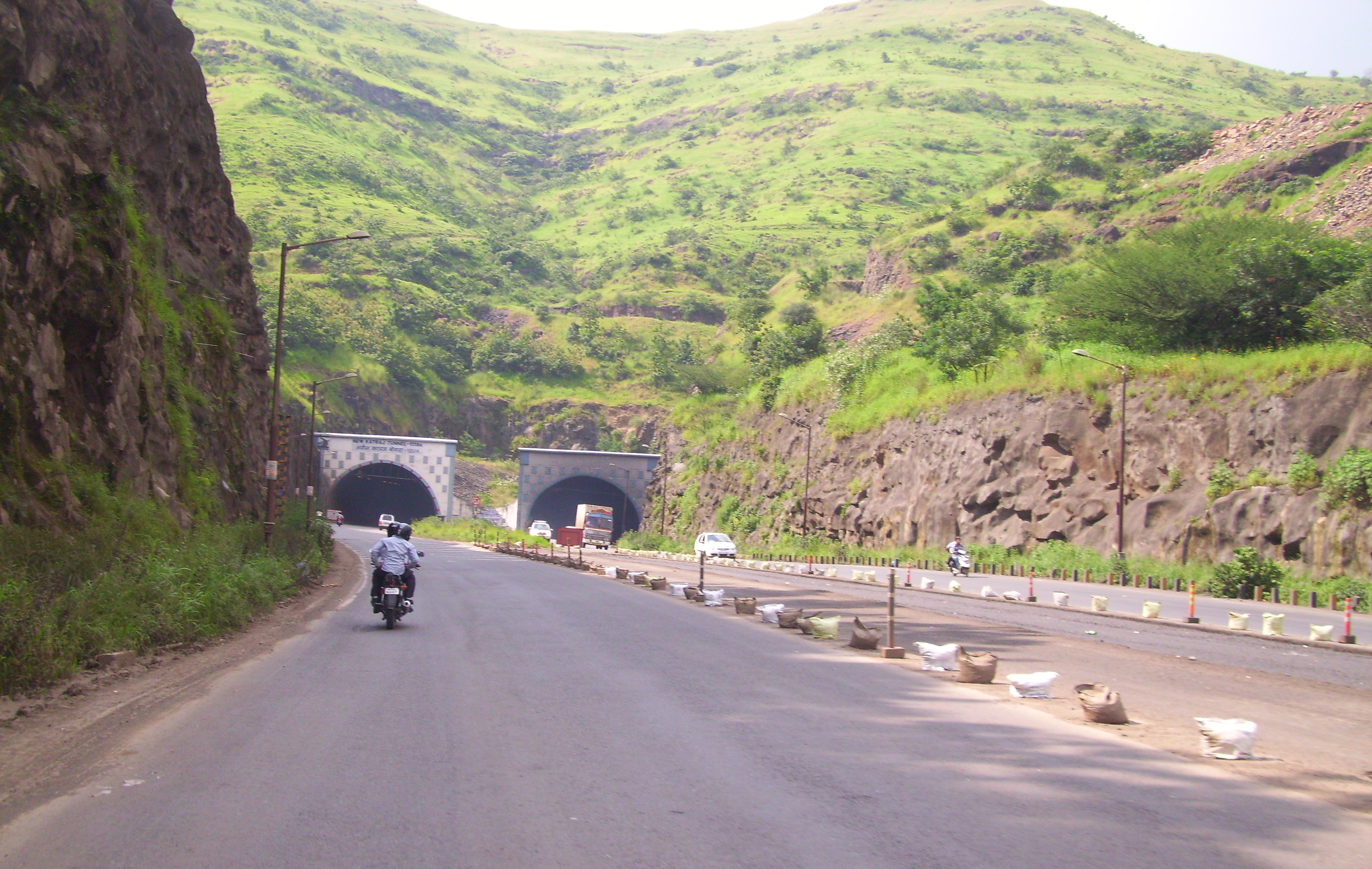
Katraj Tunnel

Katraj Ghat is a mountain pass located on the southern outskirts of the city of Pune in Maharashtra, India. A New Katraj Tunnel new tunnel of 6 lanes is constructed to bypass this ghat.

== Road ==
Katraj Ghat begins at the south of Katraj village. At the southern end of the ghat, the new alignment of NH4 through the New Katraj Tunnel merges with the old alignment of the highway.
