= National Highway 965D (India) =

National Highway in India

National Highway 965D

Route information
- Auxiliary route of NH 65
- Length: 95 km (59 mi)

Major junctions
- North end: Kedgaon
- South end: Satara

Location
- Country: India
- States: Maharashtra

Highway system
- Roads in India; Expressways; National; State; Asian
← NH 65	→ NH 48

National Highway 965D, commonly referred to as NH 965D is a national highway in India. It is a secondary route of National Highway 65. NH-965D runs in the state of Maharashtra.

== Route ==
NH965D connects Kedgaon, Supe, Morgaon, Nira, Lonand, Wathar and Satara in the state of Maharashtra.

== Junctions ==
NH 65 Terminal near Kedagaon.
NH 965DD near Lonand
NH 48 Terminal near Satara.

== See also ==
- List of national highways in India
- List of national highways in India by state
