= Majeepura =

Coordinates: 27.296°N 75.829°E

Majeepura is a village in Shahpura tehsil, Jaipur district in Rajasthan.
