= Daulatsagarsuri =

Indian Jain ascetic (1920–2024)

Shri Sangh Sthavir Gachchhadhipati Acharya Daulatsagarsuri Maharaj Saheb
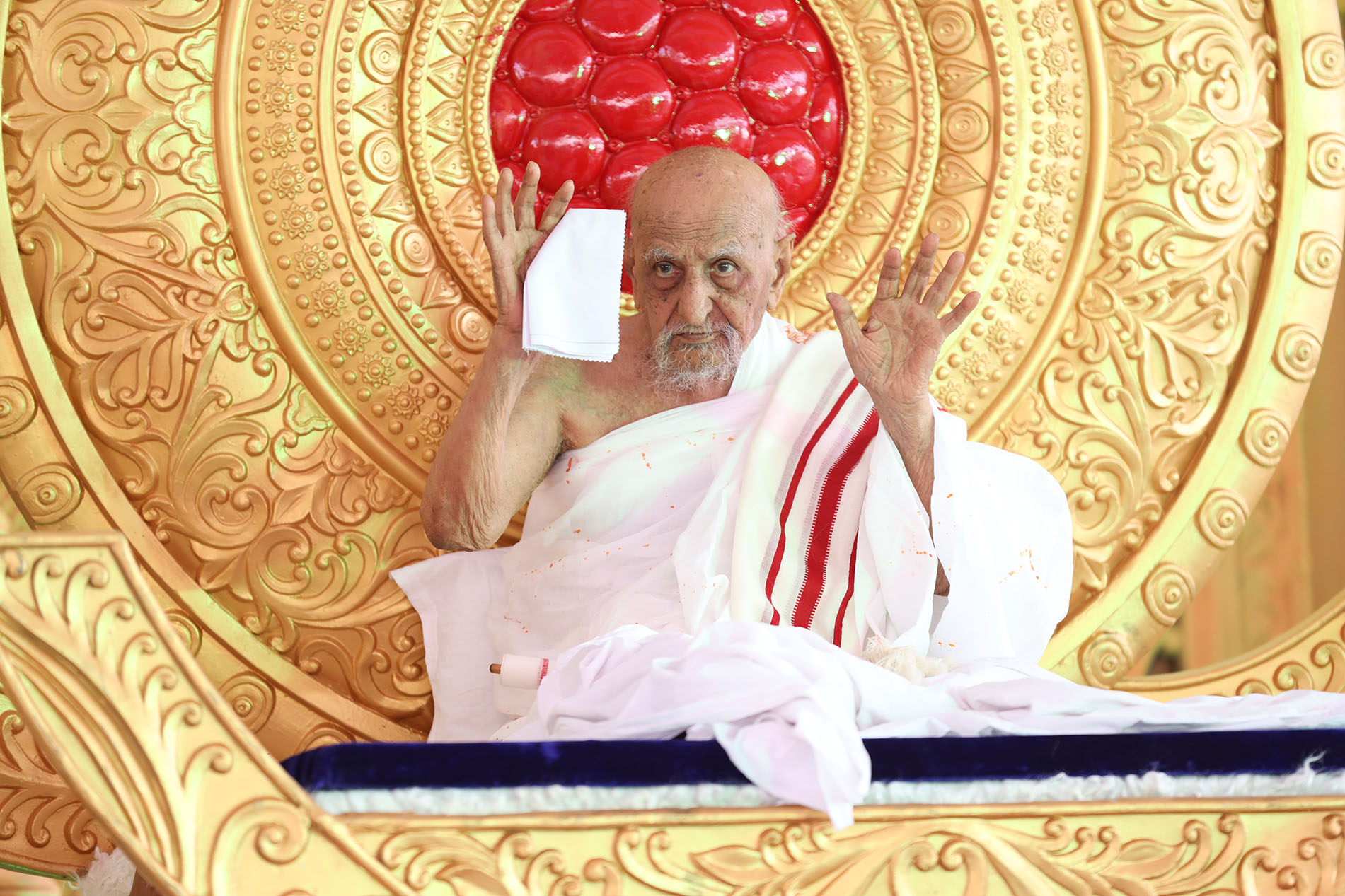
- Shri Sangh Sthavir Gachchhadhipati Acharya Daulatsagarsuri Maharaj Saheb

Personal life
- Born: Shankar Patel; 1920 Jetpur, Navagadh, Gujarat, British India
- Died: 17 February 2024 (aged 103–104) Pune, Maharashtra, India
- Parents: Maldaas Bhai (father); Diwaliben (mother)

Religious life
- Religion: Jainism
- Sect: Śvetāmbara
- Initiation: by Acharya Anandsagarsuri

Daulatsagarsuri (1920 – 17 February 2024) was a Jain ascetic, philosopher, and a revered saint belonging to the Śvetāmbara sect. He was the head of the monastic order (Gacchadhipati) of the "Sagar Samudaay" of the Tapa Gaccha. While he was alive, he was the preceptor of 900 monks and nuns. He was awarded the rarest of the rare and ancient title of "Shri Sangh Sthavir" based on his austerity, knowledge of the canonical scriptures of Jainism, and spiritual leadership, becoming the only second of the modern Jain ascetics to have achieved this feat.

== Early life ==
He was born in a Hindu, more specifically, a Patel family in Jetpur, Gujarat. At a young age of 14, he migrated to Ahmedabad seeking employment due to poor financial condition of his family. He began working for a Jain couple. It was during this job that he began taking interest in Jainism when he heard the Namokar Mantra for the first time from Śrāvikā Champa Ben. Witnessing Jain rituals regularly sowed the seeds of Jainism in him.

At 18 years of age, during Chaturmas, he met a Jain ascetic Acharya Devendrasagarsuri, who was the disciple of Acharya Anandsagarsuri. The latter was also known with the title given to him "Aagam Uddhaarak" (the savior of the aagams). This event increased his interest in Jainism manifold and he started observing Jain principles in his daily life. Witnessing Jain ascetics visiting for alms, left an indelible mark on him. This was when he decided to follow their path.

== Initiation and ascetic life ==
At 19, he renounced his family and sought refuge with Acharya Anandsagarsuri. He was initiated in the "Sagar Samudaay" of the Tapa Gaccha by Acharya Anandsagarsuri.

Despite his humble beginnings, Daulatsagarsuri displayed exceptional intellectual prowess and memory. Within 12 days, he mastered the Panch Pratikraman, and in 6 days, the Karmagranth scripture. He also memorized the Navsmaran (the 9 holy recitations of the Śvetāmbaras that include the Bhaktāmara Stotra and the Kalyan Mandir Stotra) within 36 hours, as well as 225 verses of the Veetrag Stotra within 24 hours, demonstrating his enormous memory and an immense dedication to Jain scriptures.

He is said to have spent 3 Chaturmas at his birthplace Jetpur, where no Jain family resides. He installed an idol of Munisuvrata there and inspired over 150 people to visit the temple and perform puja daily. He inspired many people belonging to other communities to emulate Jain principles in their daily life. He was given the "Gani" padvi in 1965 and his "Upadhyay" padvi in 1985. He became an Acharya in 1987. He became the head of the monastic order (Gacchadhipati) of the "Sagar Samudaay" of the Tapa Gaccha in 2009.

On 8 March 2022, he was awarded with the position of "Shri Sangh Sthavir" in a grand ceremony and in the presence of monks and nuns from all the 4 existing Gacchas of the Śvetāmbara Murtipujakas at Ahmedabad.

He also visited the 119 Kalyanak Bhoomis (places where one or more of the Panch Kalyanaka of a Tirthankara have occurred) independently to spread the message of Jainism to diverse communities.

He consecrated 37 temples and numerous idols including the 108 ft tall idol of Rishabhanatha at Jambudweep Temple, Palitana and Rohishala tirth, Palitana.

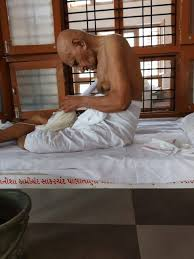
A 100-year old Acharya Daulatsagarsuri performing inspection of his rajoharan

In terms of austerities, he never consumed dairy products until 70 years of age and until 80 years of age, he always walked barefoot and did not use any vehicles. He is said to have performed Chaityavandan of every idol at Palitana temples. Until 90 years of age, he gave sermons on the canonical scriptures.

== Establishment of Aagam Mandirs ==
Daulatsagarsuri inspired and drove the movement of the establishment of "Aagam Mandirs", which are temples where all the 45 Aagam sutras are inscribed on copper plates and embedded into walls. Most "Aagam Mandirs" have Mahavira as the principal deity. He established several aagam mandirs, and the Shree Vardhaman Jain Aagam Tirth, Katraj is one of them.

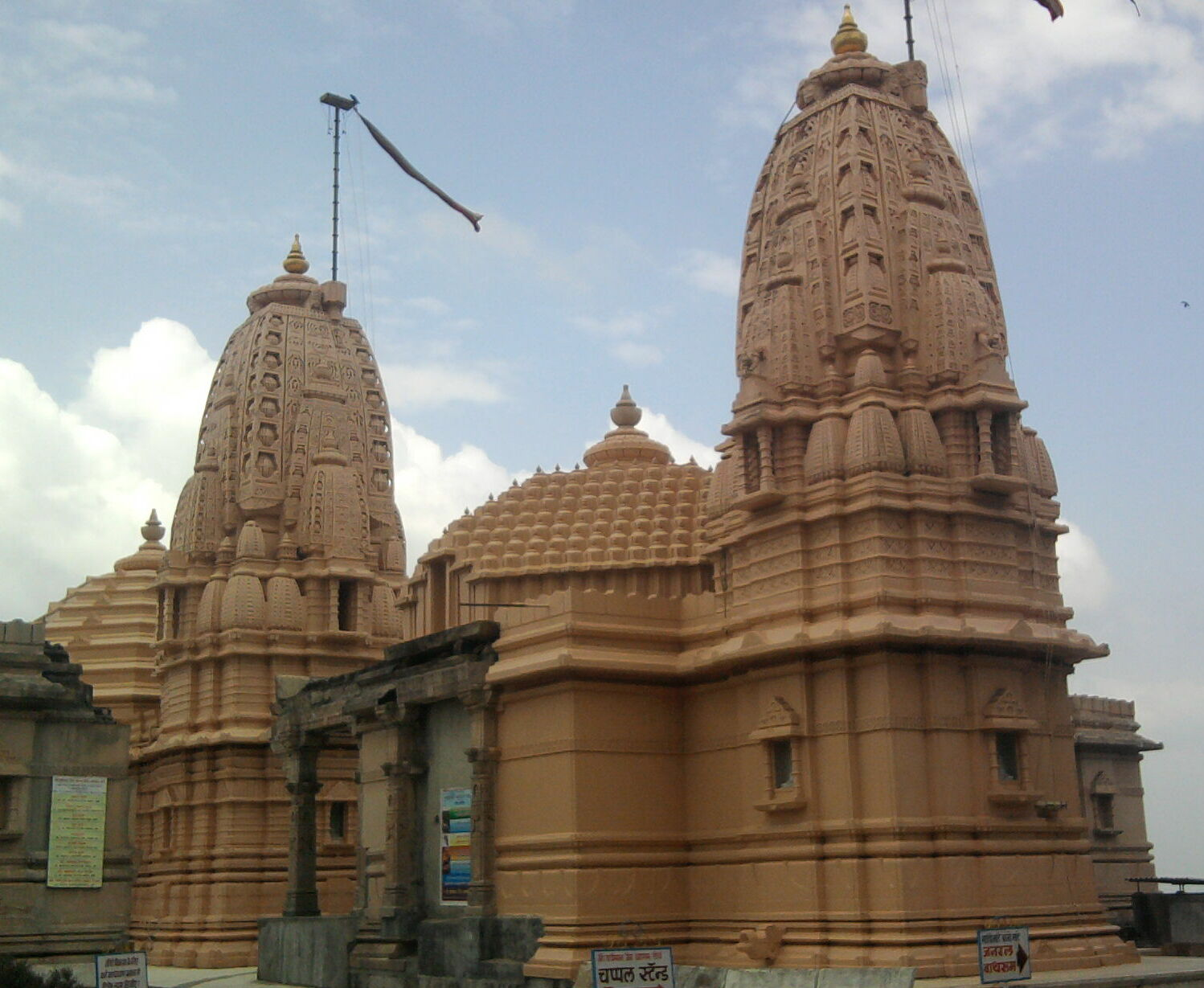
Aagam Mandir at Katraj

Apart from the above, he also established and consecrated 35 Bārsā Sūtra Mandirs and a total of 37 temples after he became an acharya.

He earned the title of "Jinagam-Sevi" (the savior of Jain Aagams) for his tireless devotion to studying and disseminating Jain scriptures, spending hours daily immersed in readings.

== Death and legacy ==
His life came to a peaceful end on 17 February 2024, at the age of 103 at Pune while reciting Namokar Mantra. His body was taken to the Katraj Aagam Mandir. A sum of 1.11 crore INR was donated after a bid to perform his final rites by his followers.

When he completed 100 years of age, his followers celebrated the day in a grand fashion coupled with several acts of charity.

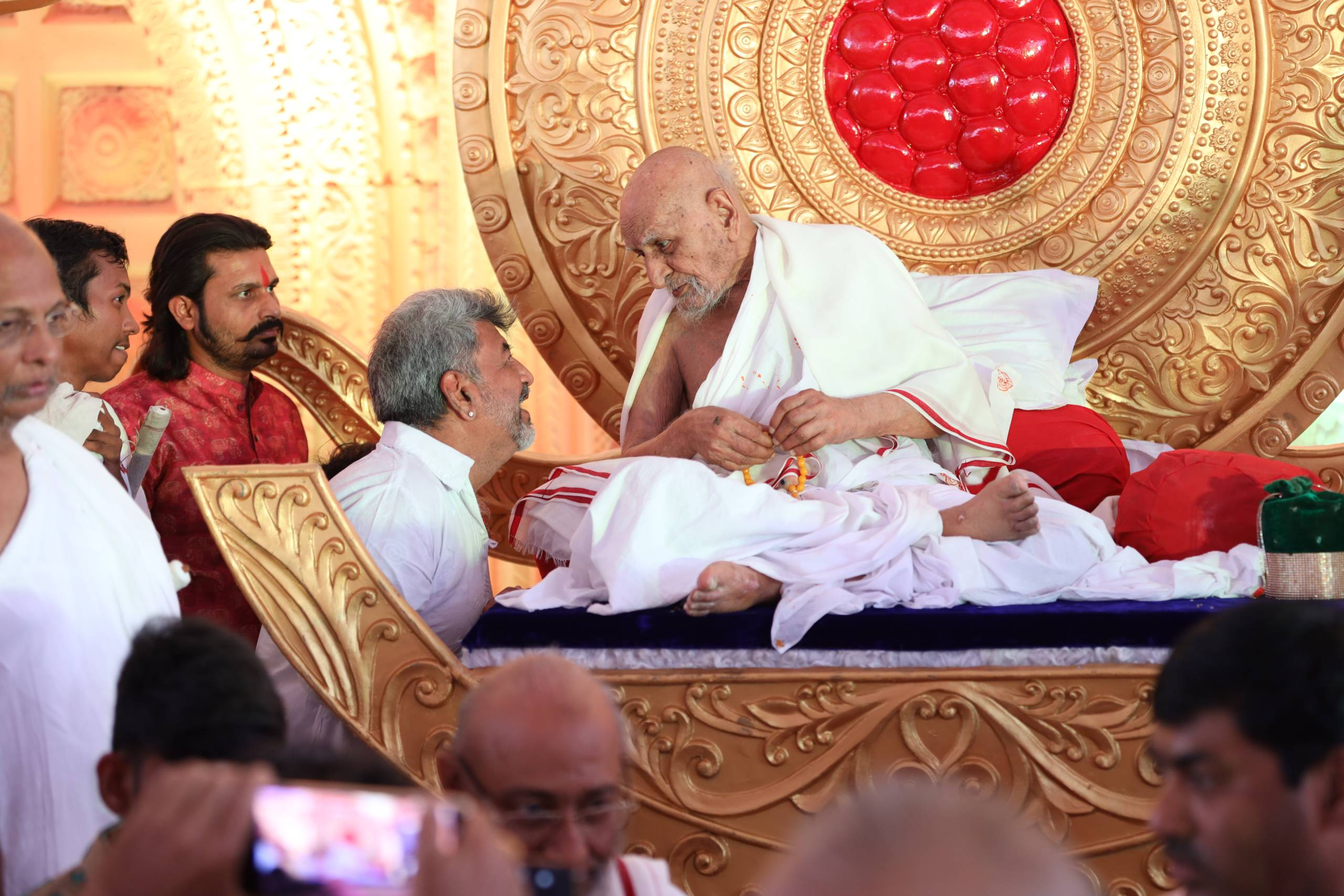
Acharya Daulatsagarsuri with his followers at the ceremony where he was awarded with the title of "Shri Sangh Sthavir" on 8 March 2022

Daulatsagarsuri's contributions to Jainism earned him widespread recognition and numerous accolades. He revived the ancient title of "Sangh Sthavir," bestowed upon him after an 88-year hiatus, signifying his wisdom and spiritual leadership. Additionally, he received numerous accolades for his record 84 years of ascetic life, becoming a revered figure in the Jain community. Of the 103 years of his life, 84 were spent in monkhood, which makes him one of the very few Jain ascetics who have spent 84 years of their life in monkhood.

Deepratnasagar muni, a monk he initiated, also wrote a short biography on him. A devotional song was also released by his followers on his 100th birth anniversary.

== Sources ==
- Devluk, Nandlal B. 2008. Dhanyadhara Shashwat Saurabh Part 01, Arihant Prakashan
- Aagamoddharakshishu Acharya Kanchansagarsuri, Shri Shatrunjay Giriraj Darshan in Sculptures and Architecture, Shree Aagamoddharak Granthmala series; volume 59, Aagamoddharak Granthmala; 1982; Kapadwanj, Gujarat, India (In English, and Gujarati)
- Federation of JAINA 2003, Jain Digest 2003 07 Volume 22 No 3, USA Federation of JAINA

== See also ==
- Devardhigani Kshamashraman
- Manatunga
- Kalapurnasuri
