= National Highway 348BB (India) =

National Highway in India

National Highway 348BB

Route information
- Auxiliary route of NH 48
- Length: 6.5 km (4.0 mi)

Major junctions
- East end: Chirner
- West end: Khopta Creek

Location
- Country: India
- States: Maharashtra

Highway system
- Roads in India; Expressways; National; State; Asian
← NH 348B	→ NH 348BB

National Highway 348BB, commonly referred to as NH 348BB, is a national highway in India. It is a secondary route of National Highway 48. NH-348BB runs in the state of Maharashtra in India.

== Route ==
NH348BB connects Chirner, Koproli and Khopta Creek in the state of Maharashtra.

== Junctions ==
NH 348B Terminal near Chirner.

== See also ==
- List of national highways in India
- List of national highways in India by state
