= National Highway 321G (India) =

National Highway in India

National Highway 321G
- Map of National Highway 321G in red

Route information
- Auxiliary route of NH 21
- Length: 19 km (12 mi)

Major junctions
- From: Jalesar
- To: Awagarh

Location
- Country: India
- States: Uttar Pradesh

Highway system
- Roads in India; Expressways; National; State; Asian
← NH 21	→ SH 31

National Highway 321G, commonly referred to as NH 321G is a national highway in India. It is a spur road of National Highway 21. NH-321 runs in the state of Uttar Pradesh in India. Agra to Etah (Via Jalesar Rejua Noohkheda Nidholi kalan)

== Route ==
NH321G connects Agra and Etah Via Rejua, Noohkhrda,Nidholi Kalan in the state of Uttar Pradesh.

== Junctions ==
NH 21 Terminal near Jalesar.
SH 31 Terminals near Awagarh.

== See also ==
- List of national highways in India
- List of national highways in India by state
- List of state highways in Uttar Pradesh
