= Wathar =

Town in Maharashtra, India

- Town
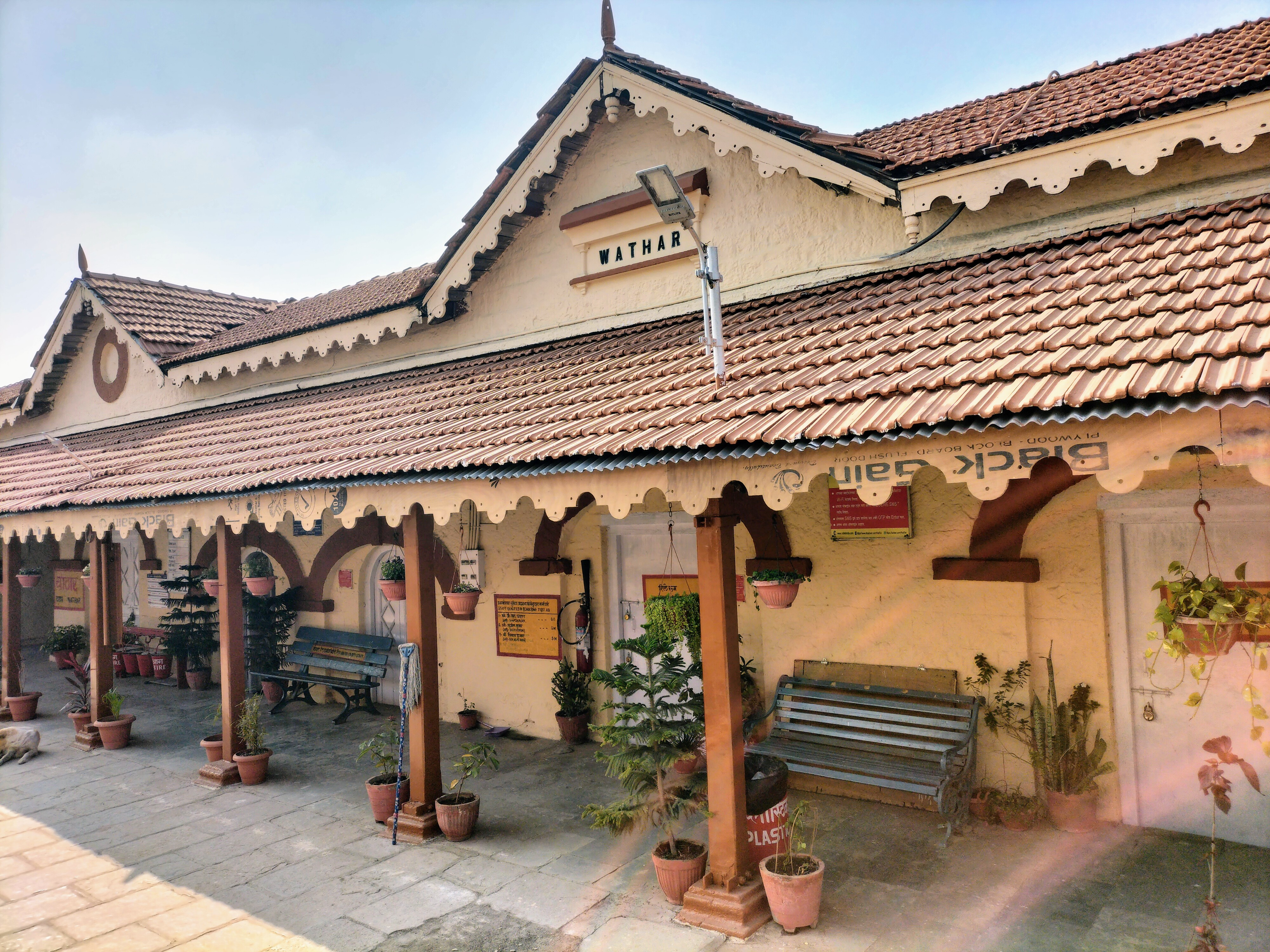
- Wathar Railway Station

- Location in Maharashtra, India
- Coordinates: 17.8903553°N 74.138383°E
- Country: India
- State: Maharashtra
- District: Satara
- Taluka: Koregaon

Government
  - Body: Gram Panchayat
- Elevation: 803 m (2,635 ft)

Population (2011)
  - Total: 5,393
  - Literacy: 80.40%
- Demonym(s): Watharkar, Satarkar

Languages
  - Official: Marathi
- Time zone: UTC+5:30 (IST)
- Pin Code: 415524
- Telephone Code: 02371
- Vehicle registration: MH-11
- Major Highways: NH-965D

Wathar also known as Wathar Station is a town in Koregaon taluka of Satara district in the Indian state of Maharashtra. It is located on NH-965D and Pune-Miraj-Londa Railway Line. It comes under Phaltan Assembly constituency and Madha Lok Sabha constituency. Wathar has a population of about 5393.

== Geography ==
Wathar is in northern Koregaon taluka, 26 km away from Satara, district headquarters.

== In popular culture ==
Wathar railway station in Satara district is one of the preferred location for shoots. This town is a major contributor to the revenue of the Indian Central Railway Zone for shooting films and commercial advertisements.

List of some movies and commercial shot in Wathar
Sr.No.	Movie/Commercial shot	Year
1.	Gori Tere Pyaar Mein	2013
2.	Zila Ghaziabad	2013
3.	Gunday	2014
4.	Jigariyaa	2014
5.	Cola Advertisement	2018
6.	Dabangg 3	2019
