= Kalapurnasuri =

20th century Indian Jain ascetic

Adhyatmayogi Acharya Kalapurnasuri Maharaj Saheb
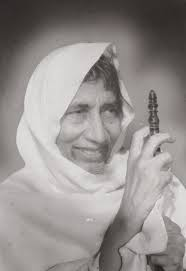
- Adhyatmayogi Acharya Shree Kalapurnasurishwarji Maharaja

Personal life
- Born: Akshayraj; May 5, 1924 Phalodi, Rajasthan
- Died: February 16, 2002 (aged 77) Keshavana, Rajasthan
- Parents: Pabudanji (father); Khamabai (mother)

Religious life
- Religion: Jainism
- Sect: Śvetāmbara
- Initiation: by Acharya Kanaksuri

Kalapurnasuri (1924–2002) was a Jain ascetic, philosopher and author of the Śvetāmbara sect. He was given the title of Adhyatmayogi based on his advanced spirituality and knowledge of scriptures.

== Early life and marriage ==
He was born in a Marwari Jain family to Pabudanji and Khamabai on May 5, 1924 (Vaishakh Sud 2, Vikram Samvat 1980) at Phalodi, Rajasthan. His parents named him Akshayraj.

He exhibited an innate affinity towards the religion and its practices since a young age. Under the guidance of his maternal uncle Shri Manekchandji, he received early training in Jain rituals. He regularly performed Snaatra Puja (ritualistic bathing of the Tirthankara idols emulating the bathing of a Tirthankara performed by Indra right after a Tirthankara's birth) and other religious rituals in temples. He had also memorized several hymns, and sutras.

Despite familial responsibilities, Akshayraj maintained a devout lifestyle, balancing his professional duties with rigorous religious observances. His marriage to a pious and courteous Ratanben at the age of 16 did not deter his spiritual pursuits; instead, it strengthened his resolve to embrace celibacy and pursue a life dedicated to Jain principles. He also had two sons - Gyanchand and Ashkaran.

== Initiation ==
In a transformative moment, at the age of 27, Akshayraj resolved to renounce worldly life. At that time, a courteous Ratanben wrote to her father Shri Mishrimalji in an attempt to convince him to talk to Akshayraj out of it. However, Mishrilalji was himself planning on renunciation. With this decision, Akshayraj and Ratanben, as well as their sons Gyanchand and Ashkaran along with Mishrilalji decided to renounce their worldly life under the guidance of revered monks. Mishrilalji had already decided that he would become a monk under Acharya Kanaksuri. Akshayraj accepted his decision wholeheartedly.

In 1952 (Vikram Samvat 2009) Akshayraj and Mishrilalji met Acharya Kanaksuri at Palitana. They were advised to read and learn religious scriptures before renunciation.

Akshayraj began his religious studies at Ahmedabad Vidyashala under the guidance of the highly revered Acharya Siddhisuri. Ratanben studied under the guidance of Sadhvishri Nirmalashriji at Bhavnagar. On completion of their studies, Acharya Kanaksuri decided to initiate all the five members of Akshayraj's family. On May 12, 1954 (Vaishakh Vad 10 of Vikram Samvat 2010), under the tutelage of Shri Ratnakarvijay and Shri Kanchanvijayji, they were initiated at Phalodi, Rajasthan.

He was renamed as Muni Kalapurnavijay while Ratanben was renamed Sadhvi Swarnaprabhashreeji. Mishrilalji was renamed Muni Kalaghotvijay, and both the sons were renamed as Muni Shri Kalaprabhvijay and Muni Shri Kalpataruvijay. Kalapurnavijay and Kalaghotvijay were declared as Acharya Kanaksuri's disciples while baal munis (child ascetics) Kalaprabhvijay and Kalpataruvijay were declared as disciples of Kalapurnavijay.

As a muni, he embarked on a journey of self-realization and spiritual growth by immersing himself in deep study of the scriptures. On completing Chaturmaas (Monsoon season) at Phalodi, Rajasthan, Kalapurnavijay and Kalaghotvijay proceeded towards Radhanpur, Gujarat where his Vadi Diksha (main initiation ceremony) took place under the tutelage of Acharya Kanaksuri.

== Ascetic life ==
After the ceremony at Radhanpur, Acharya Kanaksuri sent him to Acharya Premsuri to learn Karmasiddhant. He spent two years studying it. Later he also studied Nyaydarshan under Pandit Vajralalbhai in Jamnagar.

After 15 years of monkhood, Acharya Devendrasuri bestowed upon him, the position of a Panyas at Phalodi in 1968. Later in 1971, he was given the title of an Acharya at Bhadreshwar and was since then called Acharya Shrimad Vijay Kalapurnasurishwar Maharaja.

As a monk, he exhibited a high degree of restraint and devotion. After meeting Panyas Bhadrankarvijay at Kutch, he received valuable guidance on the realization of meditation and philosophy. He undertook great penances, and after each discourse he used to spend hours in front of Tirthankara idols, immersed in devotion. Kalapurnasuri spent most of his life spreading Jainism in Chennai, Bangalore, Coimbatore, and Rajnandgaon. In matters of devotion, he had immense reverence and devotion towards Shankheshwar Parshvanath. He spent hours in the temple, just looking at the main idol.

Acharya Kalapurnasuri and Panyas Bhadrankarvijay had a deep influence on Acharya Yashovijaysuri (then muni) and transformed him into a bhaktiyogi.

== Temple and idol consecration ceremonies ==
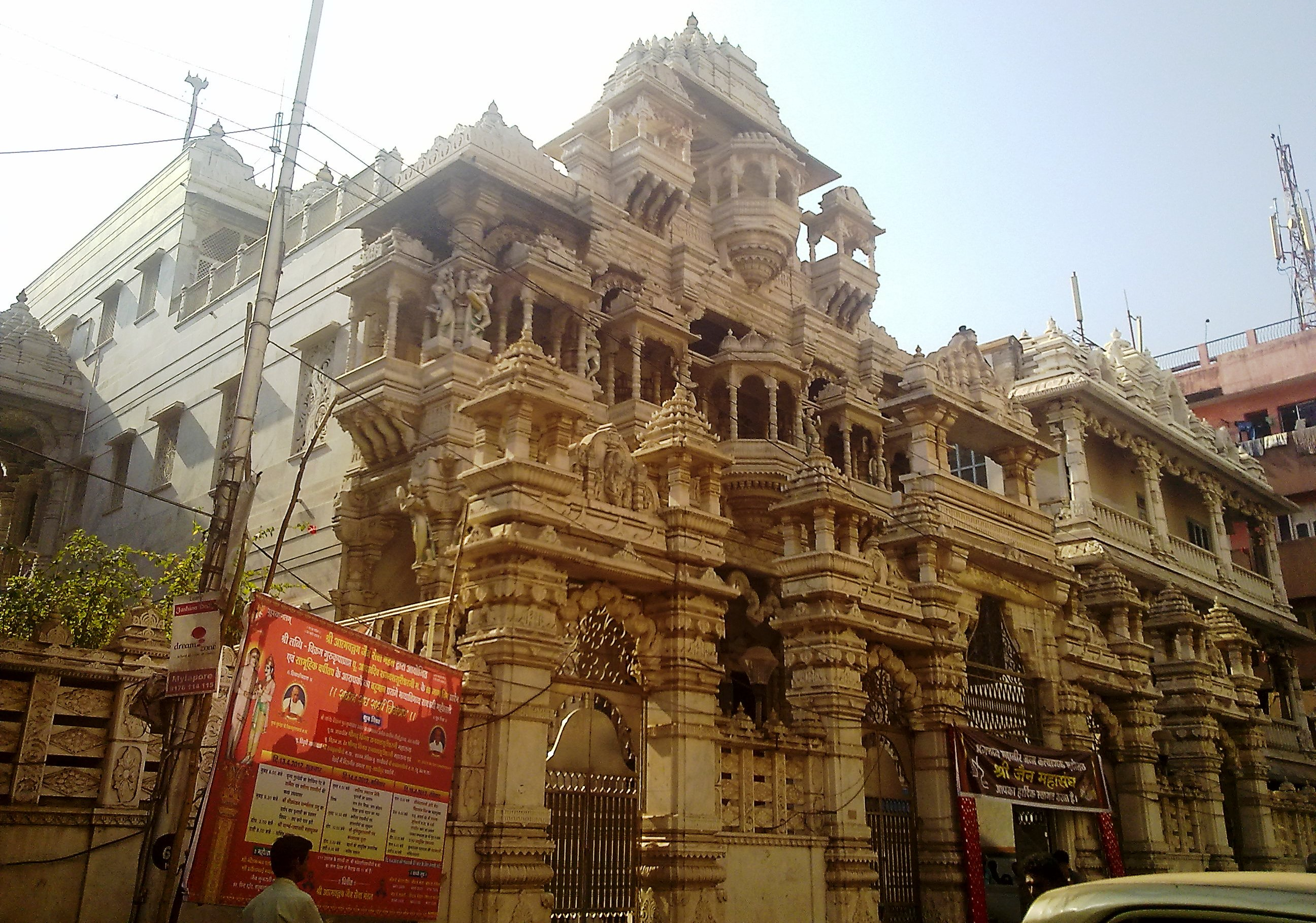
Chandraprabhu Naya Mandir in Mint Street, Sowcarpet, Chennai

In 1994, the two-storeyed Chandraprabhu Swami Naya Mandir was constructed under his guidance and the temple as well as the images were consecrated by him. In 1995, a grand temple was constructed within the premises of the Kesarwadi Tirth in Pulhal, Chennai under his guidance. The temple houses an idol of Parshvanatha consecrated by him. It also houses a Bhaktāmara Stotra Temple in the basement. On May 23, 1996, Kalapurnasuri consecrated a temple with Sambhavanatha as the main deity in Vepery. Apart from these temples in Chennai, he also consecrated many in Bangalore and Gujarat.

== Literary Works & Contributions ==
As an ascetic, he also wrote several scriptural texts and their interpretations as well as commentaries. Some of his most popular works have been listed below: -

- Kahe Kalapurnasuri
- Sarvagya Kathit Param Samayik Dharm
- Haimanushasana Trikam
- Dhyanavichar
- Param Tattvani Upasana
- Sahaj Samadhi
- Prachin Sajjhay Mahodadhi Sachitra

== Death and legacy ==
During the early hours of February 16, 2002, he felt uneasy when he was rushed from Keshavana to Jalore Hospital. He died before he could reach the hospital. His followers say he was chanting "Chandesu Nimmalayara" during the time he was feeling uneasy and his followers were chanting the Uvasaggaharam Stotra and other holy recitations. His final rites were performed at Shankheshwar, as he was most devoted to this idol of Shankheshwar Parshvanath.

His legacy remains as one of the most popular ones till date. He and his sons were the first Gacchadhipatis in sequence belonging to the same immediate family.

A shibir (religious school) for the youth has been organised under his name. Several works of philanthropy are performed in his name by his followers. A biography on his life called Kalapurna Prabodh has also been written by his followers. Further, his teachings and quotes have been compiled into a series of books titled Kahe Kalapurnasuri.

Between 2006 and 2023, a huge pilgrimage site with a grand Jain temple was built by his followers at Deolali and it was named after him, Kalapurnam.

== Sources ==
- Devluk, Nandlal B. 2010. Vishwa Ajayabi Jain Shraman. Arihant Prakashan.
- Devluk, Nandlal B. 2008. Jinshasan na Zalhlta Nakshatro. Arihant Prakashan.

== See also ==
- Siddhasena
- Yashovijaya
- Daulatsagarsuri
