= National Highway 548H (India) =

National Highway in India

National Highway 548H
- Map of National Highway 548H in red

Route information
- Auxiliary route of NH 48
- Length: 92 km (57 mi)

Major junctions
- East end: Sankeshwar
- West end: Banda

Location
- Country: India
- States: Karnataka, Maharashtra

Highway system
- Roads in India; Expressways; National; State; Asian
← NH 48	→ NH 66

National Highway 548H, commonly referred to as NH 548H is a national highway in India. It is a spur road of National Highway 48. NH-548H traverses the states of Karnataka and Maharashtra in India.

== Route ==
Karnataka

Sankeshwar

Maharashtra

Gadhinglaj, Ajara, Amboli, Madkhol, Sawantwadi, Insuli - Maharashtra border.

Goa border - Banda.

== Junctions ==
NH 48 Terminal near Sankeshwar.
NH 66 Terminal near Banda.

== See also ==
- List of national highways in India
- List of national highways in India by state
