= National Highway 965DD (India) =

National Highway in India

National Highway 965DD
- Map of National Highway 965DD in red

Route information
- Auxiliary route of NH 65
- Length: 168 km (104 mi)

Major junctions
- West end: Lonand
- East end: Pacharal

Location
- Country: India
- States: Maharashtra

Highway system
- Roads in India; Expressways; National; State; Asian
← NH 965D	→ NH 965DD

National Highway 965DD, commonly referred to as NH 965DD is a national highway in India. It is a secondary route of primary National Highway 65. NH-965DD runs in the state of Maharashtra in India.

== Route ==
NH965DD connects Lonand, Andori, Shirwal, Bhor, Apti, Mahad, Mandangarh and Pacharal in the state of Maharashtra.

== Junctions ==
NH 965D Terminal near Lonand.
NH 48 near Shirwal
NH 66 near Mahad

== See also ==
- List of national highways in India
- List of national highways in India by state
