= National Highway 23 (India) =

National highway in India

National Highway 23
- Map of the National Highway in red

Route information
- Length: 432 km (268 mi)

Major junctions
- West end: NH 52 in Kothun (Ajmer extension planned)
- NE 4 / NH 148 / NH 148N in Lalsot; NH 123 in Dholpur
- East end: NH 44 in Dhaulpur

Location
- Country: India
- States: Rajasthan

Highway system
- Roads in India; Expressways; National; State; Asian
← NH 52	→ NH 44

National Highway 23 (NH 23) is a primary national highway in India. NH-23 runs in an east–west direction, entirely in the state of Rajasthan.

== Route ==
Schematic map of National Highways in India

NH23 connects Kothun, Lalsot, Karauli, Bari and Dhaulpur in the state of Rajasthan. A further 204 kilometres (127 mi) extension of this highway to Ajmer via Phagi, Dudu & Nasirabad is planned & going on. Post completion this highway will be 432 kilometres (268 mi) long.

== See also ==
- List of national highways in India
- List of national highways in India by state
