= National Highway 848A (India) =

National highway in India

National Highway 848A
- Map of National Highway 848A in red
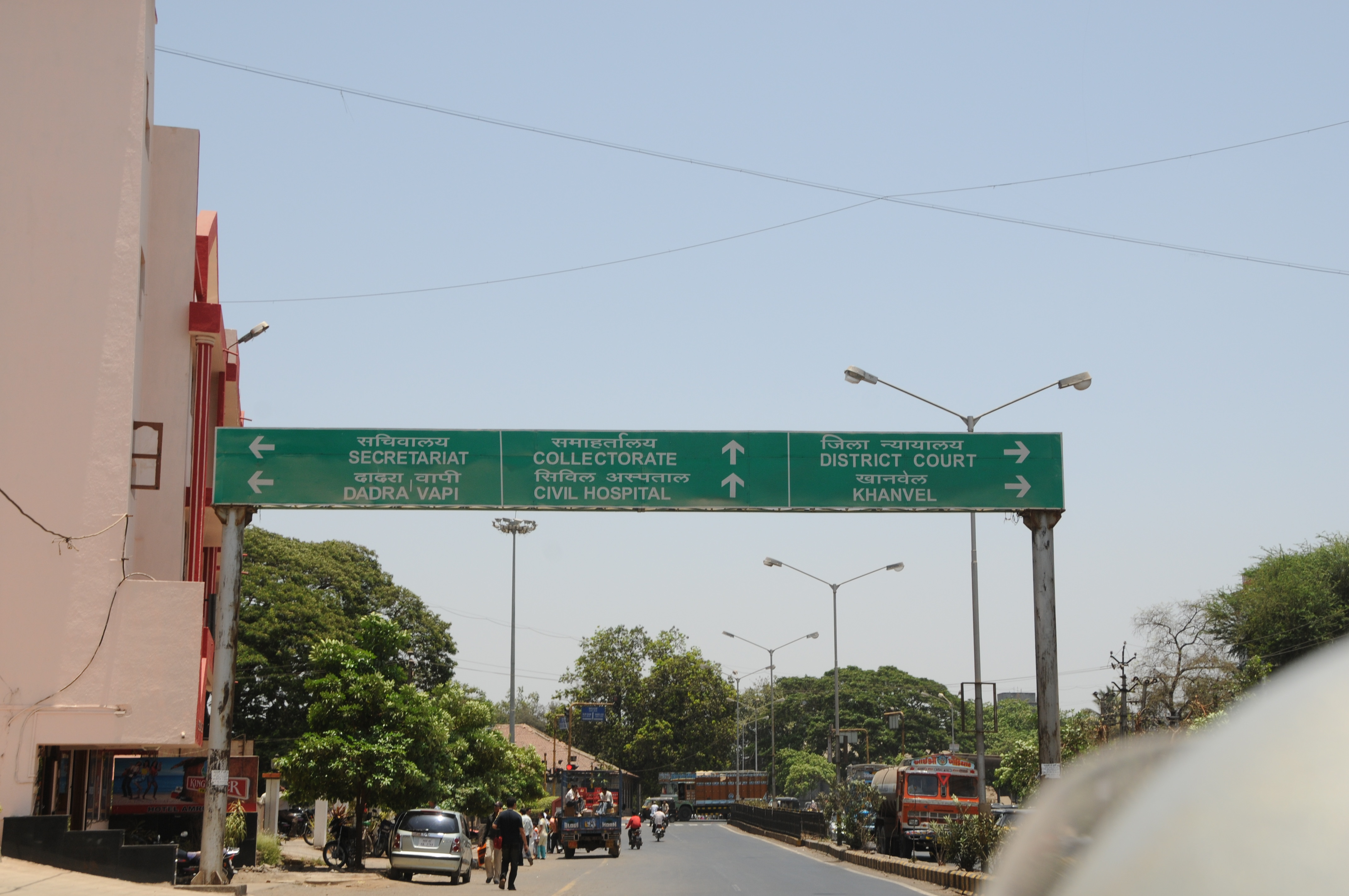
- NH848A passing through Silvassa

Route information
- Auxiliary route of NH 48
- Length: 43 km (27 mi)

Major junctions
- North end: Vapi
- South end: Talasari

Location
- Country: India
- States: Gujarat, Dadra and Nagar Haveli and Daman and Diu, Maharashtra

Highway system
- Roads in India; Expressways; National; State; Asian
← NH 48	→ NH 48

National Highway 848A, commonly called NH 848A is a national highway in India. It is a branch of National Highway 48. NH-848A traverses the states of Gujarat, Maharashtra and the union territory of Dadra and Nagar Haveli and Daman and Diu.

== Route ==
Vapi - Dadra - Pipria(Piparia) - Silvassa - Ultanfalia - Bhurkudfalia - Khadol- Surangi -Velugam - Sutrakar - Talasari.

== Junctions ==
NH 48 Terminal near Vapi.
NH 48 Terminal near Talasari.

== See also ==
- List of national highways in India
- List of national highways in India by state
