= National Highway 123 (India) =

National highway in India

National Highway 123
- Map of National Highway 123 in red

Route information
- Length: 74 km (46 mi)

Major junctions
- South end: Dholpur
- North end: Uncha Nagla

Location
- Country: India
- States: Rajasthan, Uttar Pradesh

Highway system
- Roads in India; Expressways; National; State; Asian
← NH 23	→ NH 21

National Highway 123, commonly referred to as NH 123, is a national highway in India. It is a spur road of National Highway 23. NH-123 traverses the states of Rajasthan and Uttar Pradesh in India.

== Route ==
Dholpur, Sepau, Sarendhi, Ghatoli, Rupbas, Khanuawa(Khanua), Uncha Nagla.

== Junctions ==
NH 23 Terminal near Dholpur.
NH 21 Terminal near Uncha Nagla.

== See also ==
- List of national highways in India
- List of national highways in India by state
