= National Highway 248 (India) =

National highway in India

National Highway 248
- Map of National Highway 248 in red

Route information
- Auxiliary route of NH 48
- Length: 53 km (33 mi)

Major junctions
- North end: NH 48 in Chandwaji
- South end: NH 21 in Jaipur

Location
- Country: India
- States: Rajasthan
- Primary destinations: Jaipur

Highway system
- Roads in India; Expressways; National; State; Asian
← NH 48	→ NH 48

National Highway 248, commonly referred to as NH 248, is a national highway in India. It is a spur road of National Highway 48, that branches off at Chandwaji to serve the eastern side of Jaipur. NH-248 traverses the state of Rajasthan in India.
