= National Highway 64 (India) =

National highway in India

National Highway 64
- Map of National Highway 64 in red
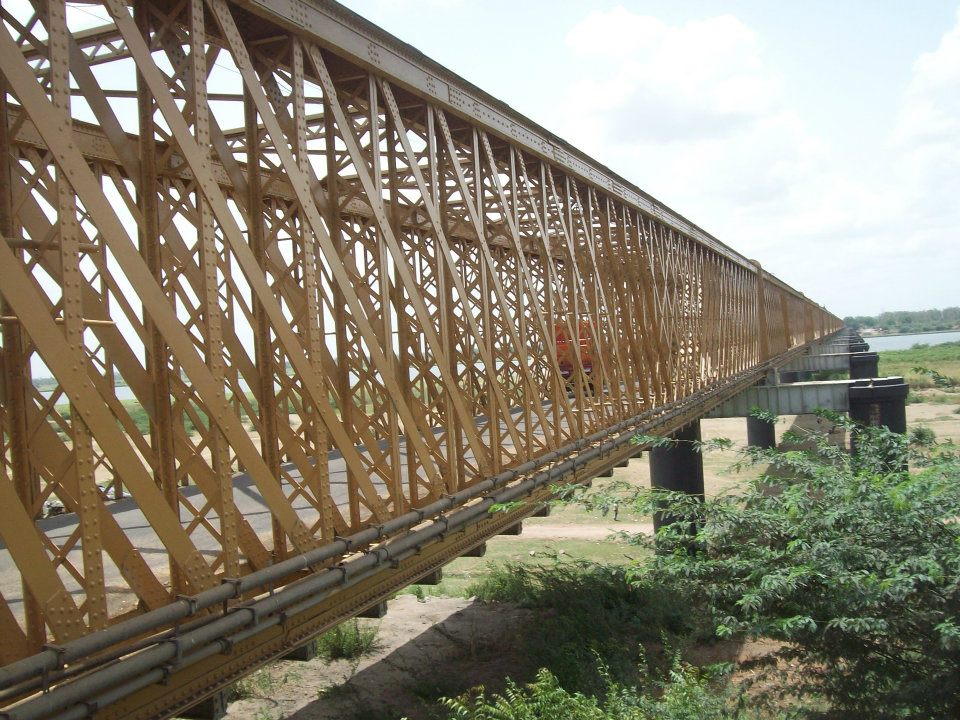
- Golden Bridge across Narmada River at Bharuch

Route information
- Length: 528 km (328 mi)

Major junctions
- North end: NH 47 in Maliya, Morbi District
- NH 48 in Maliya, Morbi District; NH 53, Sachin
- South end: Hazira

Location
- Country: India
- States: Gujarat
- Primary destinations: Dhrangadhra – Viramgam – Ahmedabad – Kheda – Anand – Vadodara – Baroda – Jambusar – Bharuch – Ankleshwar – Surat – Navsari – Dandi

Highway system
- Roads in India; Expressways; National; State; Asian
← NH 63	→ NH 65

National Highway 64 (NH 64) is a National Highway in India connecting Maliya in Morbi District and Dandi in state of Gujarat traveling 528 kilometres (328 mi) long distance.

Before renumbering, the stretch from Anand to Dandinown as NH 228, while the section from Ahmedabad to Anand was known as NH 8. This latter stretch is shared with the new NH 48.

Schematic map of National Highways in India
