= Khed, Satara =

Khed
- Census town
- Location in Maharashtra, India
- Coordinates: 17°42′19″N 74°01′44″E
- Country: India
- State: Maharashtra
- District: Satara
- Elevation: 25 m (82 ft)

Population (2001)
  - Total: 6,897

Languages
  - Official: Marathi
- Time zone: UTC+5:30 (IST)
- ISO 3166 code: IN-MH
- Website: maharashtra.gov.in

Khed is a census town in Satara district in the Indian state of Maharashtra.

== Demographics ==
As of 2001 India census, Khed had a population of 6897. Males constitute 52% of the population and females 48%. Khed has an average literacy rate of 66%, higher than the national average of 59.5%: male literacy is 71%, and female literacy is 60%. In Khed, 14% of the population is under 6 years of age.
