= New Katraj Tunnel =

Highway tunnel in Maharashtra, India

Coordinates: 18.400°N 73.847°W

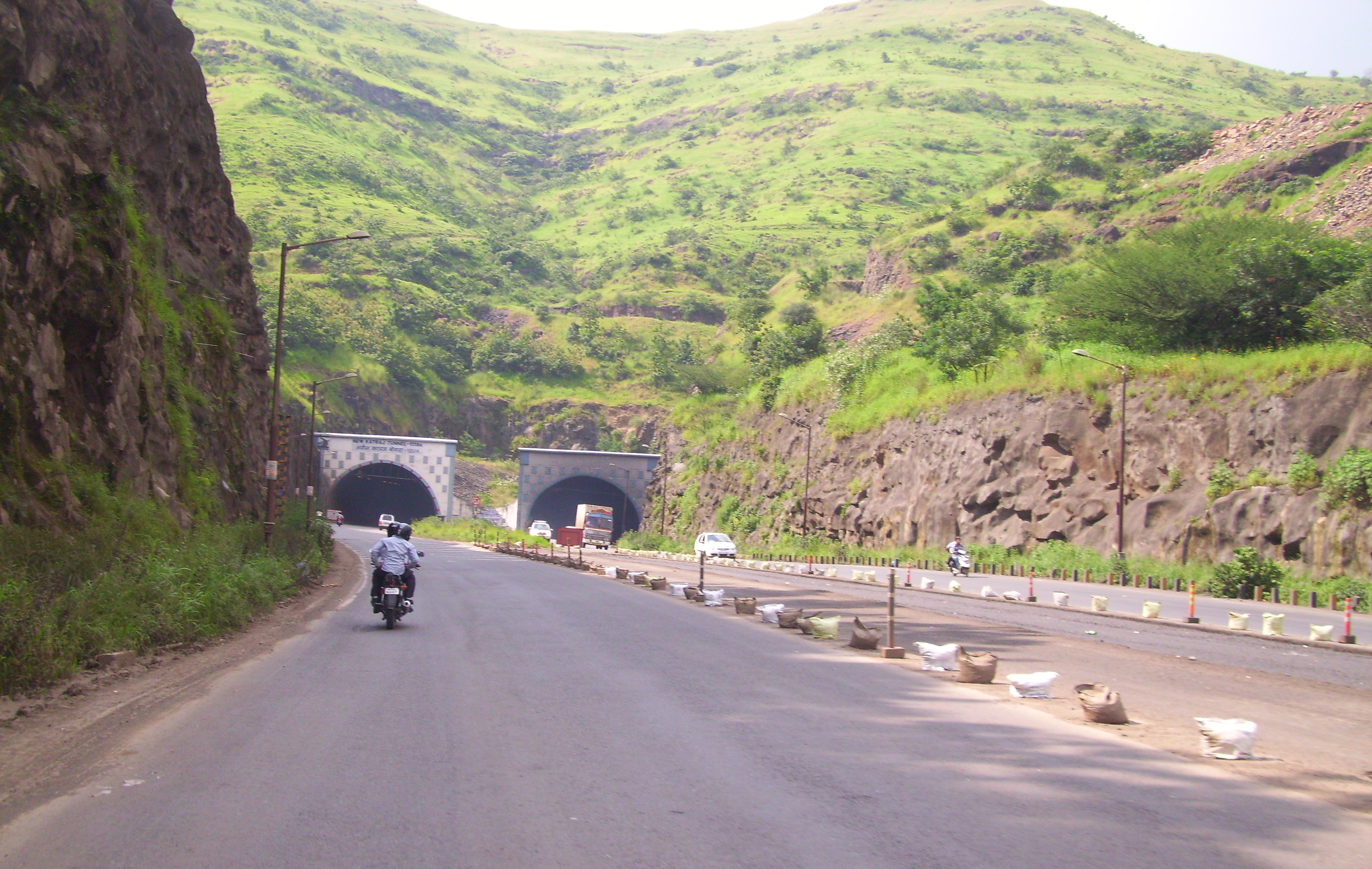
Front view (going from Pune to Satara)

The New Katraj Tunnel is a highway tunnel located on the NH 48 (formerly NH 4), Pune, in Maharashtra state of India.

It is a three-laned tunnel which stretches up to 1,223 metres on Katraj Ghat. This tunnel replaced the Old Katraj Tunnel. The Tunnel was constructed using NATM (New Austrian Tunnelling Method).

It was opened on 15 December 2006 by Chief Minister Mr. Vilasrao Deshmukh. The tunnel is part of the Golden Quadrilateral Project.
