= Kedgaon, Solapur district =

Village in Maharashtra

Coordinates: 18°16′21″N 75°04′41″E

Kedgaon
- village
- Location in Maharashtra, India Kedgaon (India)
- Country: India
- State: Maharashtra
- District: Solapur district

Languages
  - Official: Marathi
- Time zone: UTC+5:30 (IST)

Kedgaon is a village in the Karmala taluka of Solapur district in Maharashtra state, India.

== Demographics ==
Covering 1,579 hectares (3,900 acres) and comprising 585 households at the time of the 2011 census of India, Kedgaon had a population of 2690. There were 1462 males and 1228 females, with 304 people being aged six or younger.
