= National Highway 148 (India) =

National highway in India

National Highway 148
- Map of National Highway 148 in red

Route information
- Auxiliary route of NH 48
- Length: 105 km (65 mi)

Major junctions
- North end: Manoharpur (Jaipur district)
- South end: Lalsot (Dausa district)

Location
- Country: India
- States: Rajasthan
- Primary destinations: Dausa

Highway system
- Roads in India; Expressways; National; State; Asian
← NH 48	→ NH 23

National Highway 148, commonly referred to as NH 148, is a national highway of India. It is a spur road of National Highway 48. NH-148 traverses the state of Rajasthan in India. This highway is part of former NH 11A.

== Route ==
Manoharpur - Dausa - Lalsot.

== Junctions ==
NH 48 Terminal near Manoharpur.
NH 21 near Dausa.
NH 23 Terminal near Lalsot.

== See also ==
- List of national highways in India
- List of national highways in India by state
