= Golegaon =

Village in Maharashtra

Golegaon (Palam) is a small village in Purna taluka of Parbhani district in the Marathwada region of Maharashtra, India with total 163 families residing. The Golegaon Palam village has population of 835 of which 454 are males while 381 are females as per Population Census 2011.

In Golegaon Palam village population of children with age 0-6 is 102 which makes up 12.24% of total population of village. Average Sex Ratio of Golegaon Palam village is 843 which is lower than Maharashtra state average of 929. Child Sex Ratio for the Golegaon Palam as per census is 855, lower than Maharashtra average of 894.

Golegaon Palam village has lower literacy rate compared to Maharashtra. In 2011, literacy rate of Golegaon Palam village was 71.27% compared to 82.34% of Maharashtra. In Golegaon Palam Male literacy stands at 82.37% while female literacy rate was 58.08%.

As per constitution of India and Panchyati Raaj Act, Golegaon Palam village is administrated by Sarpanch (Head of Village) who is elected representative of village.

It is situated on the bank of the Godavari River, near to Palam.

This village has a poor transport system,

Education is major issue and agriculture is the main domain.
