= National Highway 548 (India) =

National highway in India

National Highway 548
- Map of National Highway 548 in red

Route information
- Auxiliary route of NH 48
- Length: 5 km (3.1 mi)

Major junctions
- North end: Kalamboli Circle
- South end: Kalamboli at NH 348 Junction

Location
- Country: India
- States: Maharashtra

Highway system
- Roads in India; Expressways; National; State; Asian
← NH 48	→ NH 348

National Highway 548, commonly called NH 548 is a national highway in India. It is a spur road of National Highway 48. NH-548 traverses the state of Maharashtra in India.

== Route ==
Kalamboli – Junction with NH348.

== Junctions ==
NH 48 Terminal near Kalamboli.
NH 348 Terminal at Km 5.67.

== See also ==
- List of national highways in India
- List of national highways in India by state
