= National Highway 458 (India) =

National Highway in India

National Highway 458
- Map of National Highway 458 in red

Route information
- Auxiliary route of NH 58
- Length: 276 km (171 mi)

Major junctions
- North end: Ladnun
- South end: Bheem

Location
- Country: India
- States: Rajasthan

Highway system
- Roads in India; Expressways; National; State; Asian
← NH 65	→ NH 58

National Highway 458, commonly referred to as NH 458 is a national highway in India. It is a spur road of National Highway 58. NH-458 traverses the state of Rajasthan in India.

== Route ==
Ladnu -nimbi-Sherani-Khatu - Degana - Merta - Lambia - Jaitran - Raipur - Bheem.

== Junctions ==
- Terminal with National Highway 58 near Ladnun.
- Terminal with National Highway 58 near Bheem.

== See also ==
- List of national highways in India
- List of national highways in India by state
