= Peth Islampur =

Village in Maharashtra

Coordinates: 17.056°N 74.229°E

Peth Islampur is a village in the Sangli district of India, with a population of 11,238 as of 2011. The village is depicted in a movie named Chandu Champion as native village of Murlikant Petkar.
