= Kedgaon, Ahmednagar district =

Village in Maharashtra

Kedgaon Nagar Kedgaon
- village
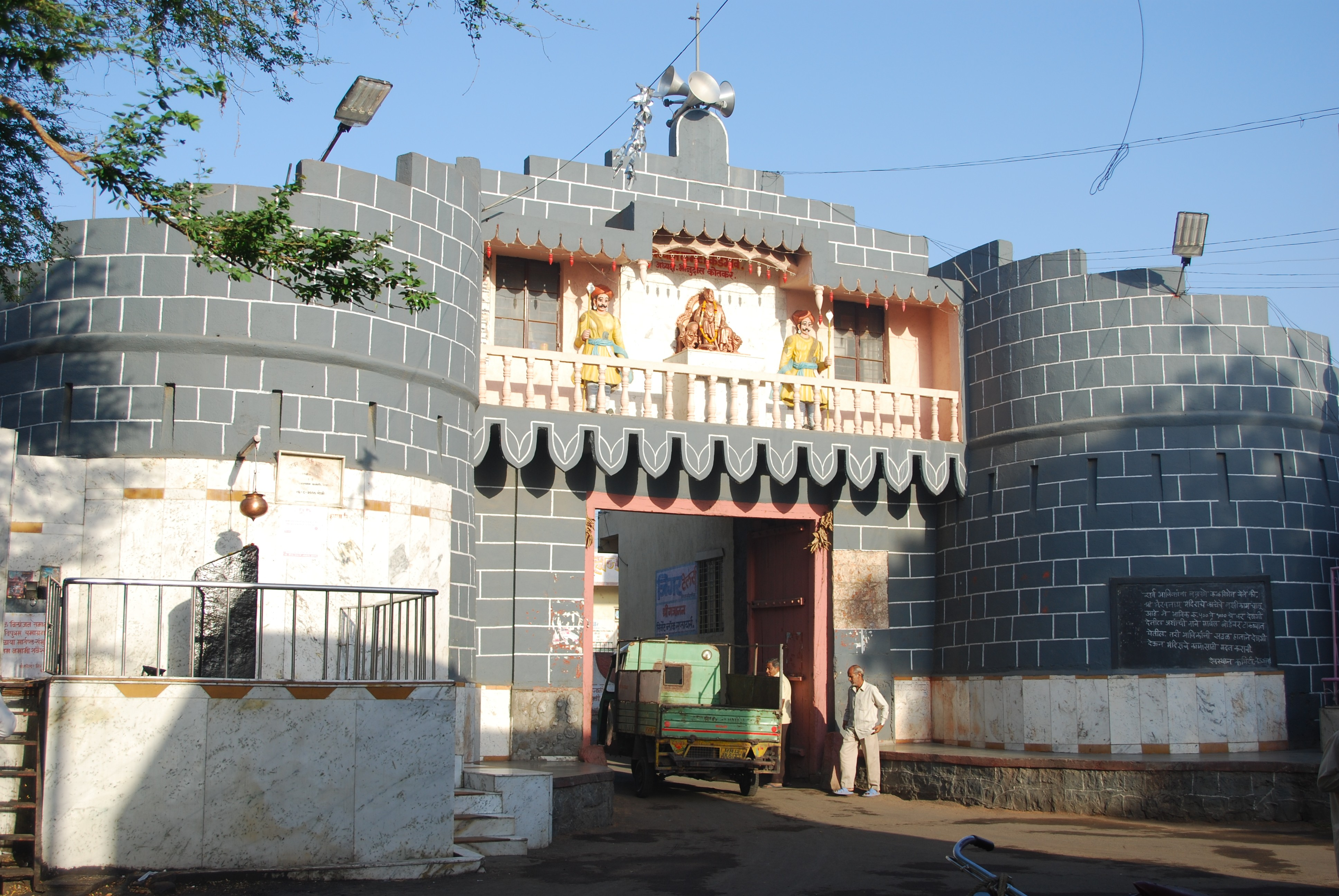
- Village gate, 2009

- Location in Maharashtra, India Kedgaon (India)
- Coordinates: 18.43°N 74.35°E
- Country: India
- State: Maharashtra
- District: Ahmednagar

Population (2006)
  - Total: 45,000

Languages
  - Official: Marathi
- Time zone: UTC+5:30 (IST)
- PIN: 414005
- Telephone code: 0241
- Vehicle registration: MH 16 sex_ratio =

Kedgaon is part of Ahmednagar Municipal Corporation divided by the Nagar-Pune highway in Ahmednagar district in Maharashtra state of India. Its population is 75,000. Kedgaon is around 3 km from Ahilyanagar railway station and 5 km from Ahmednagar ST (state transport) old bus-stand. The village has a famous Durga/Renuka goddess temple. People from all religions visit this temple to celebrate Navratri festival. Kedgaon is included in Ahmednagar city municipal corporation and most of its citizens speak Marathi.

== Images of the place ==
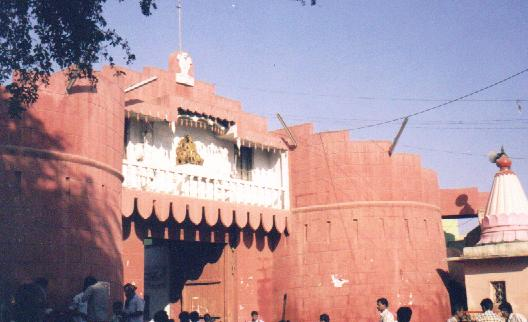
Gate to enter Kedgaon - year 2000

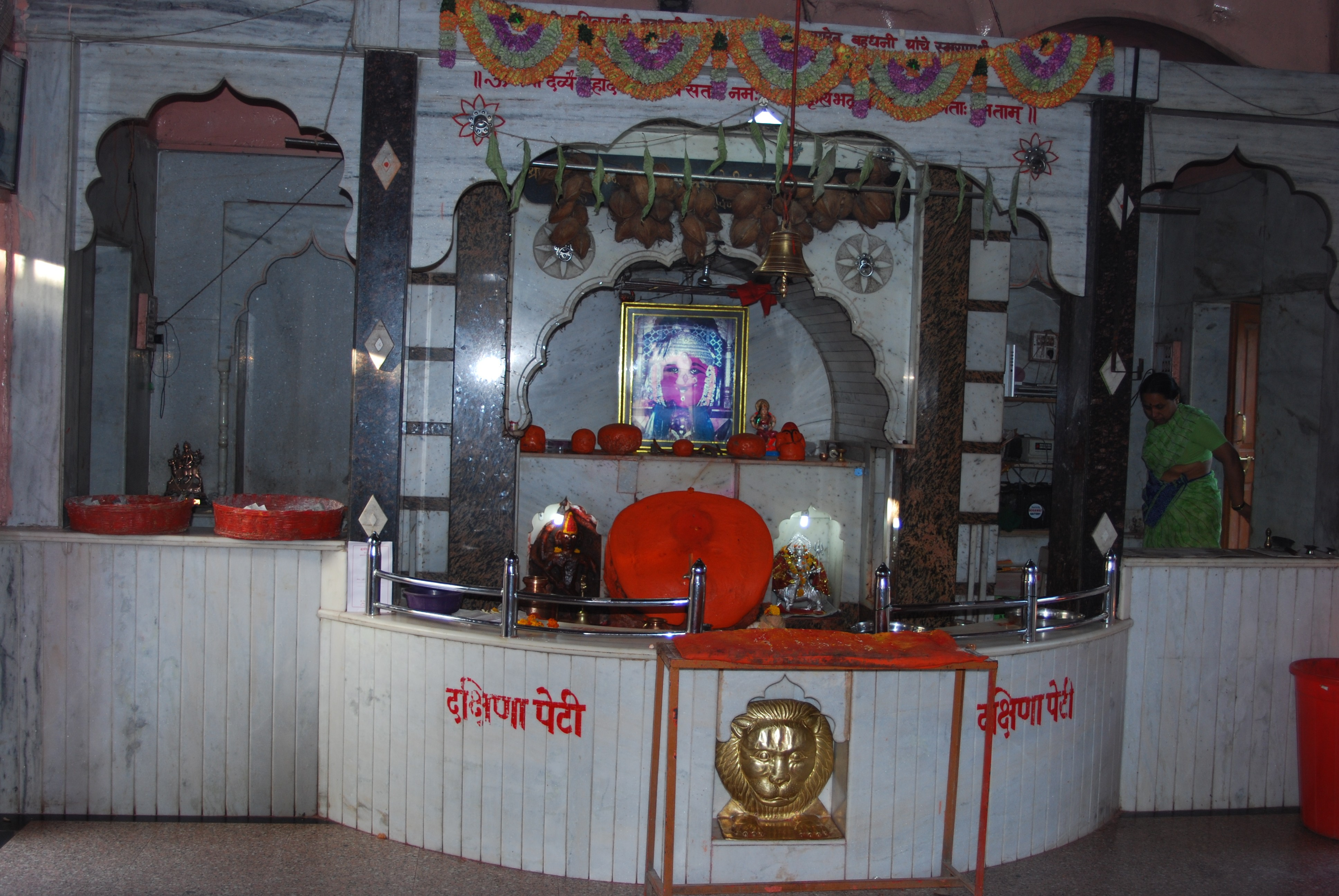
Renuka/Durga Goddess

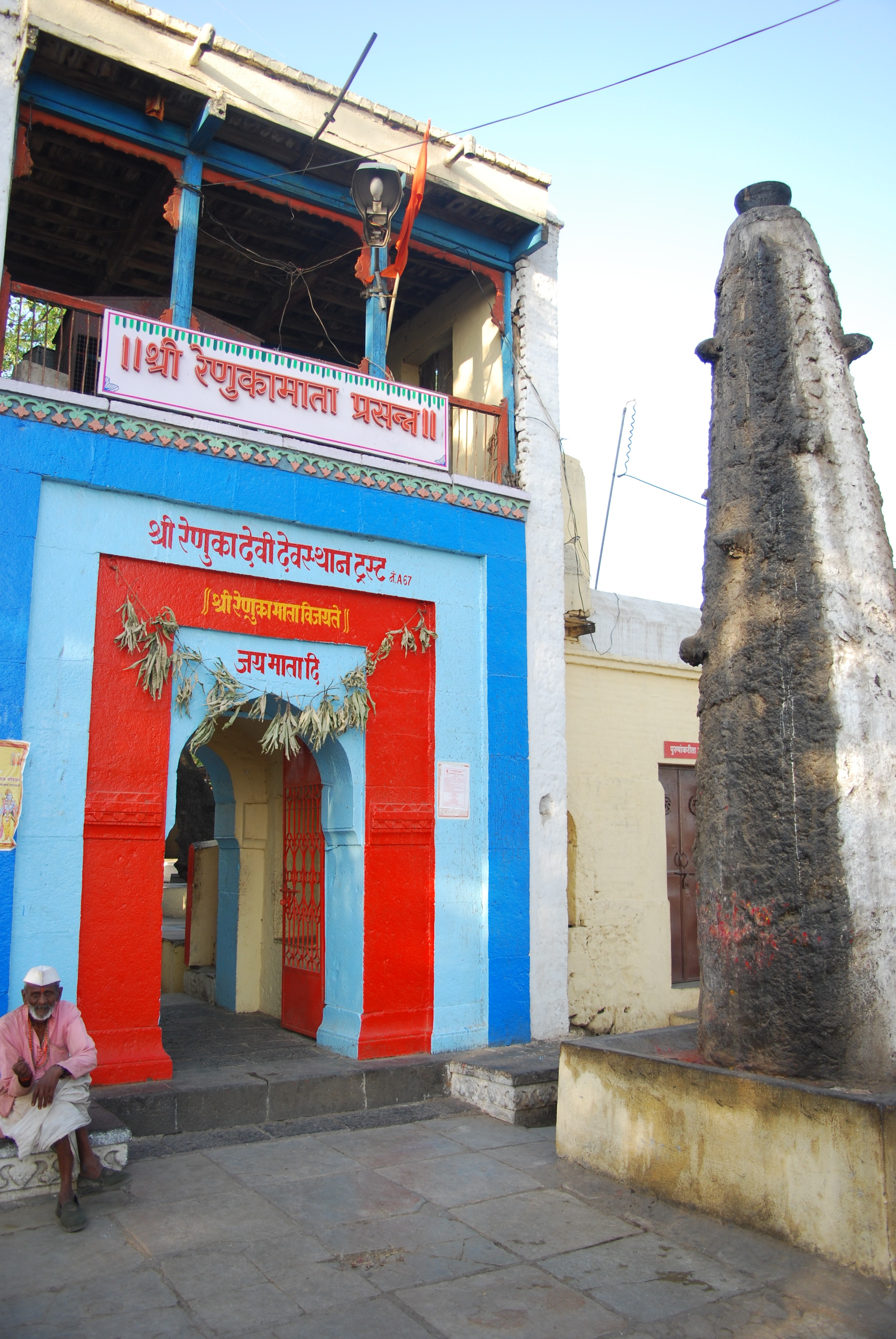
Renuka/Durga Goddess Temple Entrance

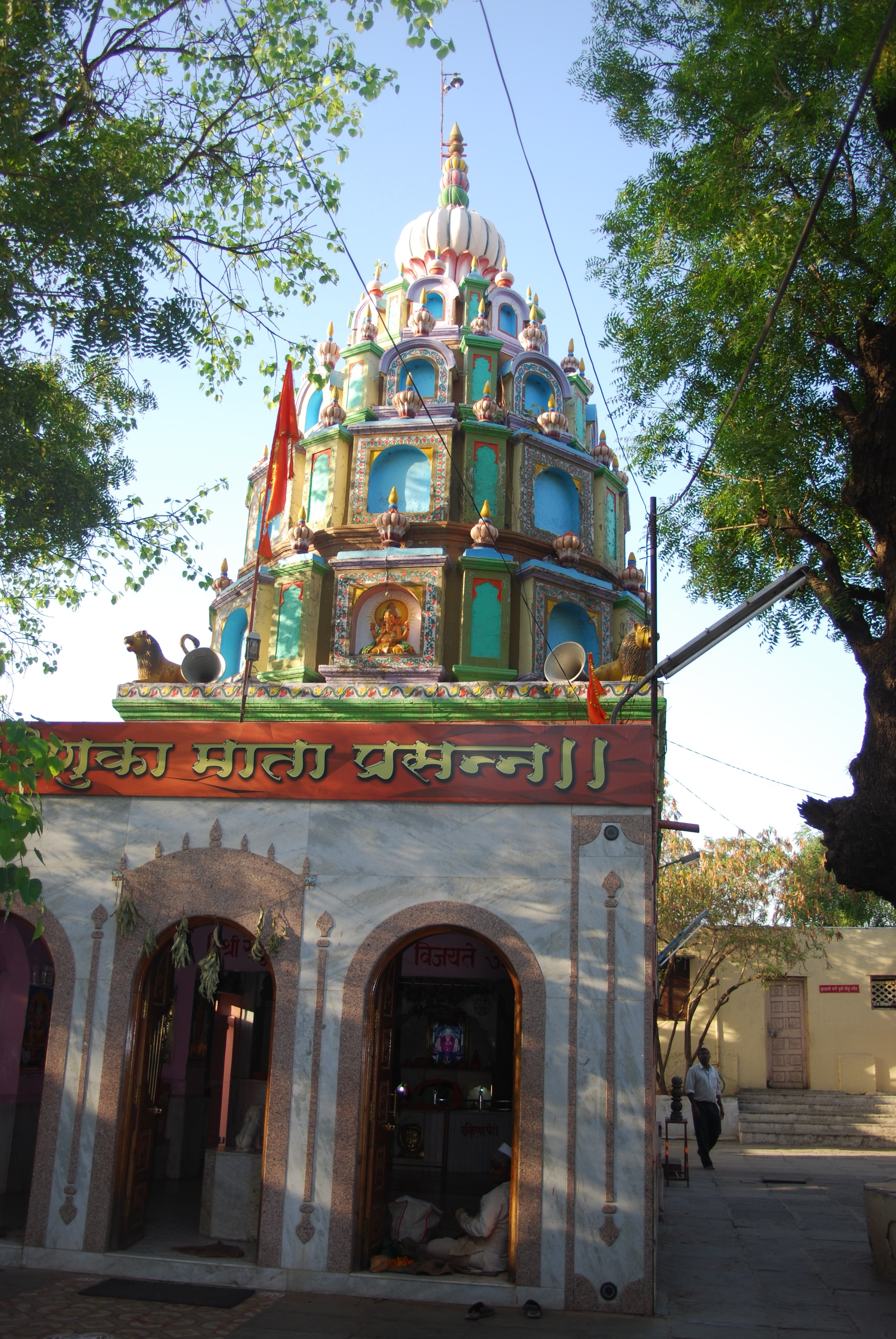
Renuka/Durga Goddess Temple
