= National Highway 758 (India) =

National highway in India

National Highway 758
- Map of National Highway 758 in red

Route information
- Auxiliary route of NH 58
- Length: 156 km (97 mi)

Major junctions
- West end: Rajsamand
- East end: Ladpura

Location
- Country: India
- States: Rajasthan

Highway system
- Roads in India; Expressways; National; State; Asian
← NH 58	→ NH 27

National Highway 758, commonly referred to as NH 758 is a national highway in India. It is a spur road of National Highway 58. NH-758 traverses the state of Rajasthan in India.

== Route ==
Rajsamand - Kunwariya - Gangapur - Bhilwara - Ladpura.

== Junctions ==
NH 58 Terminal near Rajsamand.
NH 27 Terminal near Ladpura.

== See also ==
- List of national highways in India
- List of national highways in India by state
