= Chandwaji =

- town
- Location in Rajasthan, India Chandwaji (India)
- Coordinates: 27°13′N 75°57′E
- Country: India
- State: Rajasthan
- District: Jaipur
- Elevation: 434 m (1,424 ft)

Languages
  - Official: Hindi
- Time zone: UTC+5:30 (IST)
- Vehicle registration: RJ-
- Coastline: 0 kilometres (0 mi)

Chandwaji is a town in Jaipur district, Rajasthan, India.

== Geography ==
It is located at 27°13′N 75°57′E at an elevation of 434 m above MSL. congress leader Kuldeep Choudhary Adv residence
