= Shirwal =

- Census town
- Shirwal
- Location in Maharashtra, India
- Coordinates: 18.13°N 73.98°E
- Country: India
- State: Maharashtra
- District: Satara

Government
  - Body: Village Council
- Elevation: 603 m (1,978 ft)

Population (2001)
  - Total: 11,887

Languages
  - Official: Marathi
- Time zone: UTC+5:30 (IST)
- Postal code: 412801

Shirwal is a census town in Satara district in the Indian state of Maharashtra.

== Geography ==
Shirwal lies on the banks of River Nira. It is a village located at a strategic location between Satara and Pune. Shirwal is located at 18.13°N 73.98°E. It has an average elevation of 603 meters (1978 feet).

== Demographics ==
As of 2001 India census, Shirwal had a population of 11,887. Males constitute 52% of the population and females 48%. Shirwal has an average literacy rate of 72%, higher than the national average of 59.5%: male literacy is 78%, and female literacy is 66%. In Shirwal, 13% of the population is under 6 years of age.

== History ==
Shirwal has a very old civilization i.e. from the era of Chhatrapati Shivaji Maharaj. Shirwal has a small fort named Subhanmangal. This fortress is important from the historic point of view as the first open battle between Chhatrapati Shivaji Maharaj's men and Adilshahi was fought here.

== Features ==
For many years after independence, Shirwal was just a small outpost on the Pune-Kolhapur route. In 1999, Former Prime Minister of India Shri Atal Bihari Vajpayee announced the Golden Quadrilateral Highway Project connecting four of India's major cities, Delhi-Mumbai-Chennai-Kolkata and face of the village Shirwal changed forever. The Golden Quadrilateral Highway passes through Shirwal and this has made it an important location for industrialization. Shirwal is also the middle point in the two major cities, Pune and Satara. Due to these reasons, many Indian as well as foreign companies including Godrej, ACG, Spica industries pvt ltd [Spica Group] have established their factories in Shirwal. This has created a boom in the housing and real estate business in Shirwal.

== Transportation ==
Shirwal is well connected by road. The National Highway 48 (NH 48), part of Golden Quadrilateral Highway, passes through Shirwal. This makes it easy to reach Shirwal from Mumbai, Pune, Bengaluru, etc. The nearest airport is Pune Airport. The nearest railway stations are Lonand and Nira.

== Education ==
Shirwal is home of numerous renowned educational institutions. Shirwal has one of the six veterinary colleges under Maharashtra Animal & Fishery Sciences University, Nagpur named as Krantisinh Nana Patil College of Veterinary Science. College was established in year 1988. There are several primary and higher secondary schools as well as junior colleges located within the boundaries of Shirwal.
