= National Highway 162 (India) =

National highway in India

National Highway 162
- Map of the National Highway in red

Route information
- Length: 89 km (55 mi)

Major junctions
- North end: Bar
- NH 62
- South end: Bhatewar

Location
- Country: India
- States: Rajasthan
- Primary destinations: Pali

Highway system
- Roads in India; Expressways; National; State; Asian
← NH 25	→ NH 27

Schematic map of National Highways in India

National Highway 162 (NH 162) is a National Highway in India. It is a spur road of National Highway 62. NH-162 traverses the state of Rajasthan in India. NH162 route was extended from Pali to Bhatewar.

== Route ==
Bar, Sojat City, Pali, Marwad, Nadol, Desuri, Kumbalgarh, Haldighati, Nathdwara, Mavli, Bhatewar.

== Junctions ==
NH 25 Terminal near Bar.
NH 62 near Pali.
NH 14 Terminal near Bhatewar.

== See also ==
- List of national highways in India
- List of national highways in India by state
