= Chharodi Lake =

Lake in Ahmedabad, Gujarat, India

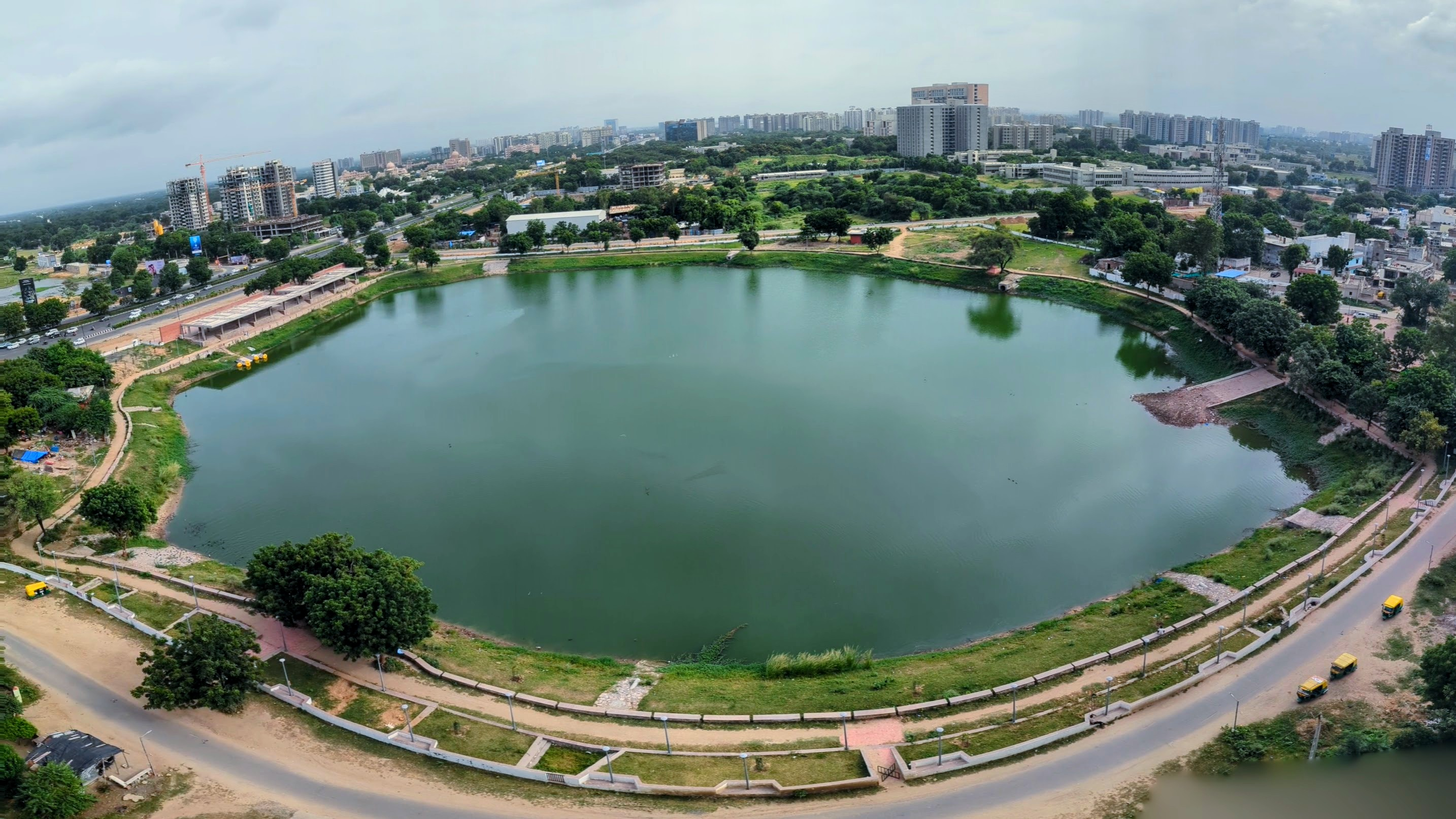
- Panoramic view of the lake
- Interactive map of Chharodi Lake
- Location: Chharodi, Sarkhej–Gandhinagar Highway, Ahmedabad, Gujarat
- Coordinates: 23.12301°N 72.54054°E
- Lake type: Artificial lake
- Primary inflows: Storm water and Narmada Canal
- Basin countries: India
- Surface area: 42,593 m^{2} (458,470 sq ft)
- Settlements: Ahmedabad

Chharodi Lake is located near Chharodi village on Sarkhej–Gandhinagar Highway in Ahmedabad, Gujarat, India.

== History ==
The lake plot in Survey No. 251 of Chharodi village was transferred by Government of Gujarat to Ahmedabad Municipal Corporation (AMC) for free in March 2020 to develop it as a public space and as a water storage. The development work was started by holding online ceremony under the presence of Union Home Minister Amit Shah on 11 September 2020. The encroachments on the plot were removed in March 2023. The lake was developed by AMC at the cost of ₹5.26 crore (US$550,000). It was inaugurated by Union Home Minister Amit Shah on 21 May 2023. In May 2023, 26 houses were demolished to create space for an amusement park and a garden in future.

== Features ==
The lake is spread over an area of 42,593 square metres (458,470 sq ft). It has a capacity to store 167.70 million litre of water and is interlinked with other lakes. There is a 716 metres (2,349 ft)-long walking track surrounding the lake. (Note: GPS recorded data shows that the track length is of 742 metres (2,434 ft) but the references mention it to be 716 metres (2,349 ft)-long.) A gallery box is built to relax and view the lake. Two 'pay and use' toilets are also there. The lake has parking capacity of 40 cars on west side, 31 cars on east side and 156 two-wheelers on south side.

== Gallery ==
Video of the lake at night

Video of the lake in morning

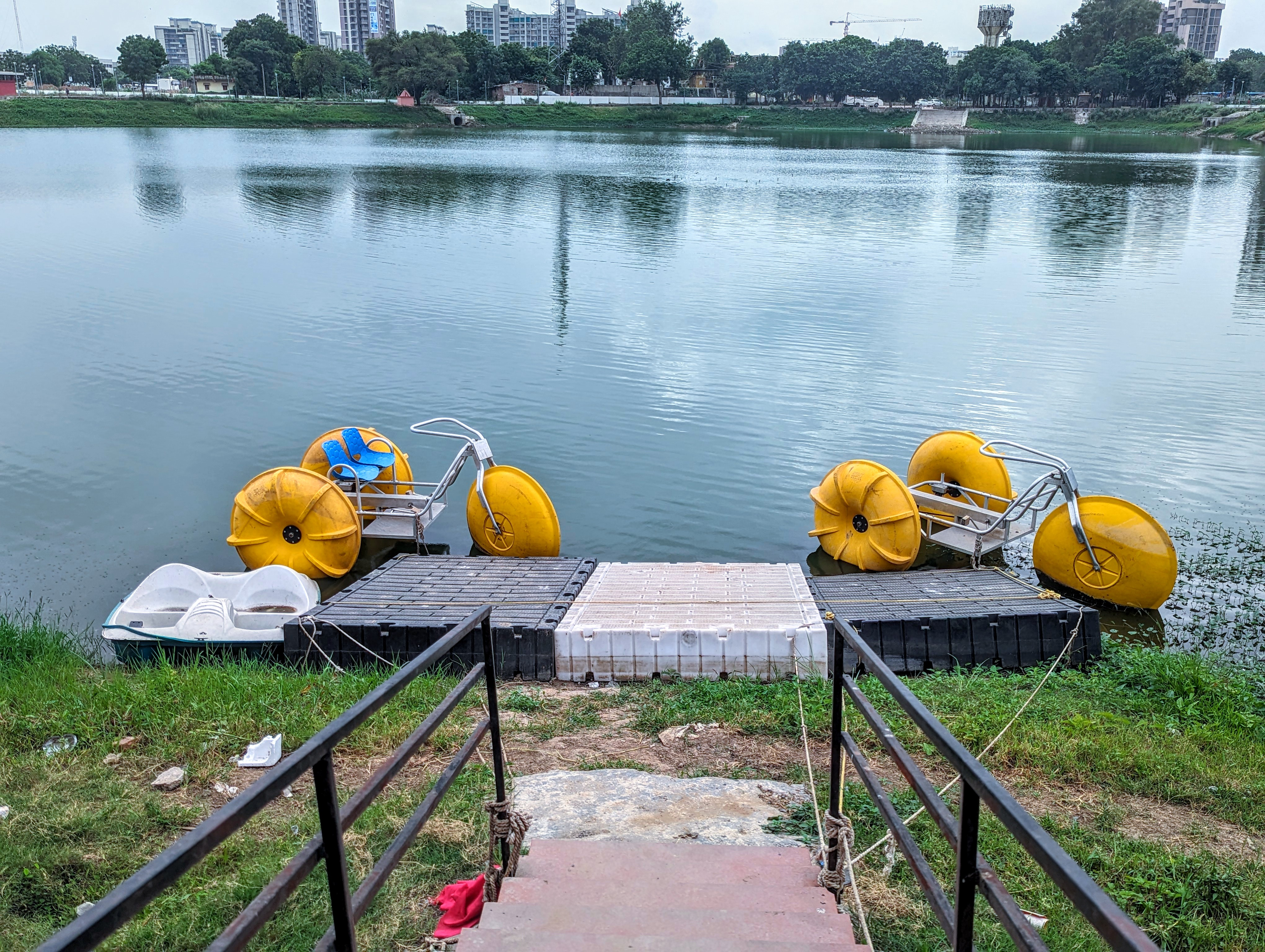
Water cycles in lake

== See also ==
- Kankaria Lake
- Chandola Lake
- Vastrapur Lake
