= National Highway 147 (India) =

National highway in India

National Highway 147
- Map of the National Highway in red

Route information
- Auxiliary route of NH 47
- Length: 217 km (135 mi)

Major junctions
- North end: Chilloda on NH48
- South end: Doliya on NH47

Location
- Country: India
- States: Gujarat

Highway system
- Roads in India; Expressways; National; State; Asian
← NH 48	→ NH 47

National Highway 147, commonly referred to as NH 147 is a national highway in India. It runs from NH48 at Gandhinagar to NH47 at Doliya. The Sarkhej–Gandhinagar Highway is part of this NH147. NH147 covers distance of 217 kilometres (135 mi) running via Sarkkhej, Sanand, Viramgam, Malvan, Surendranagar & Muli.

== Route ==
Chilloda - Gandhinagar - Sarkhej - Sanand - Viramgam - Malvan - Surendranagar - Muli - Doliya.

== Junctions ==
NH 47 Terminal near Doliya.
Interchange with SH21 near Muli.
NH 51 at Surendranagar.
Interchange with SH7 near Malvan.
Interchange with SH17 near Viramgam.
Cloverleaf interchange with SH41 near Adalaj
NH 47 Terminal near Sarkhej.
NH 48 Terminal near Chilloda.

== Auxiliary Routes/Spur Roads Numbered Like NH147 ==
- National Highway 147A(NH147A) connects NH47 near Godhra, Lunavada, Modasa, NH48 near Javanpura running for 116 kilometres (72 mi)
- National Highway 147B(NH147B) connects NH147D near Talava, Dahod, Bordi, Tanda, Rambhapur, Meghnagar, Bhagor, NH147E near Kalyanpura running for 84.4 kilometres (52.4 mi)
- National Highway 147C(NH147C) connects NH47 near Godhra, Baroda, Dabhoi, Tilakvada, NH56 near Devaliya running for 160 kilometres (99 mi)
- National Highway 147D(NH147D) connects NH-47 near Limkheda, Limdi, Talava, Thandla, Petlavad, Badnawar in MP running for 157 kilometres (98 mi)
- National Highway 147E(NH147E) connects NH47 near Jhabua in MP with Kalyanpura, Nawagaon, Raipuriya, Bamania, Ratlam, Jaora, NH 156 near Mandsaur in MP running for 202 kilometres (126 mi)

== See also ==
- List of national highways in India
- List of national highways in India by state
