= List of tallest buildings in Ahmedabad =

This list includes the tallest buildings in Ahmedabad City limits, in India. (Note: This list does not include buildings located in Gandhinagar or GIFT City, even though some may claim they are part of the same urban agglomeration.)

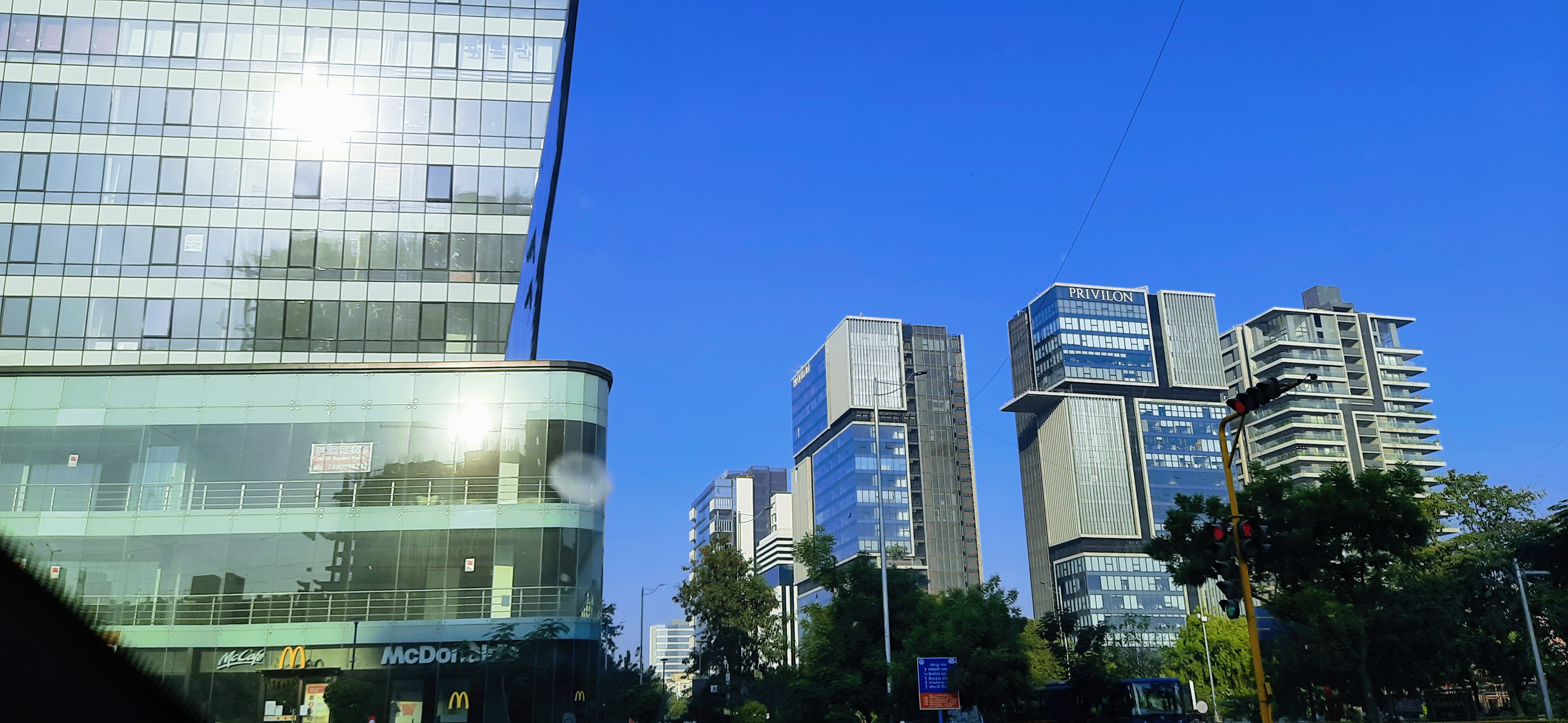
The skyline of SG Highway in Ahmedabad.

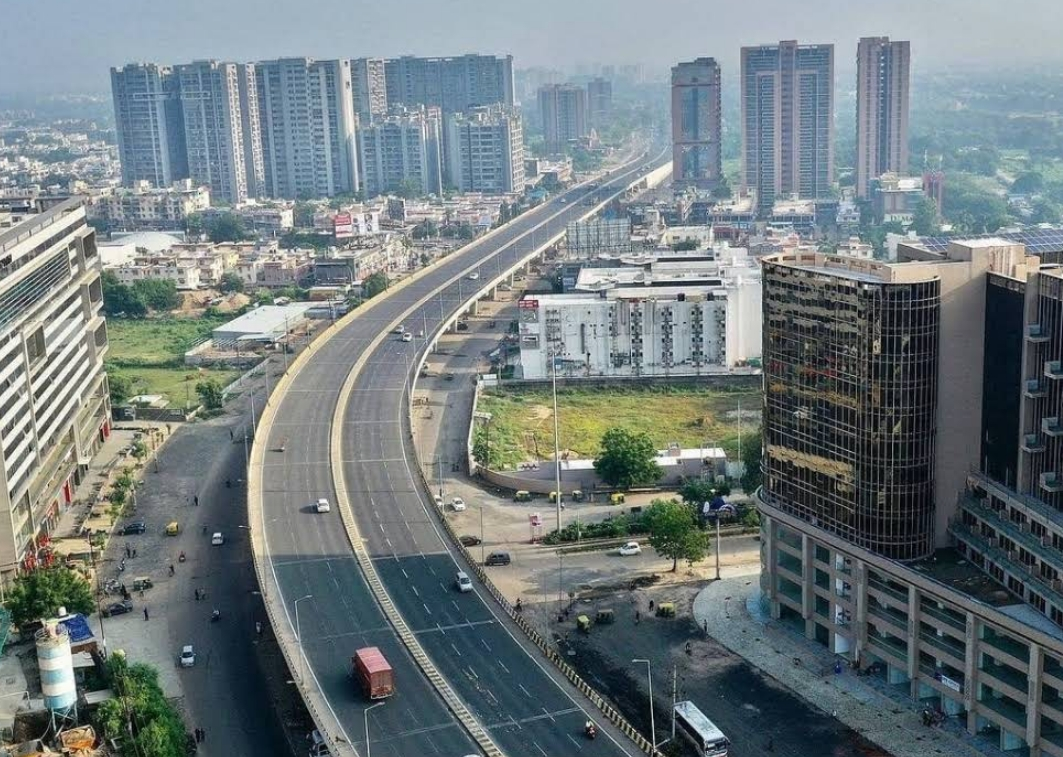
The skyline of Ahmedabad.

== Tallest buildings ==
This lists ranks buildings in Ahmedabad that stand at least 65 metres (213 ft) based on standard height measurement. This includes spires and architectural details but does not include antenna masts. Only completed buildings and under-construction buildings that have been topped out are included.

Rank	Name	Height	Floors	Year	Building type	Location	Ref.
1	Mondeal One	148 metres (486 ft)	35	2023	Commercial		
2	Z Luxuria	145 metres (476 ft)	33	2023	Residential		
3	The 31st	133.75 metres (439 ft)	32	2022	Residential		
4	Z2	130 metres (427 ft)	32	2024	Commercial		
5	Trogon twin tower	130 metres (427 ft)	31	2024	Commercial		
6	Times 104	130 metres (427 ft)	29	2025	Residential		
7	Takshashila Air Tower-A	115.4 metres (379 ft)	25	2020	Residential		
7	Takshashila Air Tower-B	115.4 metres (379 ft)	25	2020	Residential		
9	SVP Hospital	78 metres (256 ft)	18	2019	Hospital		
10	Laxmi Sky City	70 metres (230 ft)	22	2021	Residential		
11	Zydus Hospital	70 metres (230 ft)			Hospital		
12	Seventy 1	70 metres (230 ft)	22	2020	Residential		
12	Seventy 2	70 metres (230 ft)	22	2020	Residential		
14	Shapath V	70 metres (230 ft)	19	2015	Commercial		
15	Westgate D Block	70 metres (230 ft)	22	2018	Commercial		
16	Sun Sky Park 1	70 metres (230 ft)	22	2020	Residential		
16	Sun Sky Park 2	70 metres (230 ft)	22	2020	Residential		
16	Sun Sky Park 3	70 metres (230 ft)	22	2020	Residential		
19	Solitaire Sky	70 metres (230 ft)	22	2020	Commercial		
20	Mondeal Heights Tower-A	70 metres (230 ft)	17	2016	Commercial		
20	Mondeal Heights Tower-B	70 metres (230 ft)	17	2016	Commercial		
22	Privilon Tower-A	70 metres (230 ft)	22	2019	Commercial		
22	Privilon Tower-B	70 metres (230 ft)	22	2019	Commercial		
24	Paarijat Eclat Tower-A	70 metres (230 ft)	23	2014	Residential		
24	Paarijat Eclat Tower-B	70 metres (230 ft)	23	2014	Residential		
26	ITC Narmada	70 metres (230 ft)	19	2022	Commercial		
27	Patang - The Revolving Restaurant	67 metres (219.816 ft)	1	1984	Restaurant		
28	Taj Skyline	65 metres (213.255 ft)	18	2020	Commercial		

== By category ==
Category	Name	Height (m)
Tallest Commercial Buildings	Mondeal One	148 metres (486 ft)
Tallest Commercial Buildings	Mondeal Heights	130 metres (427 ft)
Tallest Commercial Buildings	West Gate – D Block	127 metres (417 ft)
Tallest Commercial Buildings	Shapath V	126 metres (413 ft)
Tallest Commercial Buildings	Privilon	120 metres (394 ft)
Tallest Residential Buildings	The 31st	133.75 metres (439 ft)
Tallest Residential Buildings	Takshashila AIR	115.4 metres (379 ft)
Tallest Residential Buildings	Sun Sky Park 1,2,3	112 metres (367 ft)
Tallest Residential Buildings	Seventy 1 and 2	109 metres (358 ft)
Tallest Hospitals	SVP Hospital	78 metres (256 ft)
Tallest Hospitals	Zydus Hospital	75 metres (246 ft)
Tallest Restaurant	Patang Hotel	70 metres (230 ft)

== Tallest under construction ==
- Royce One, a 156m Residential tower with 40 floors.
- Titanium World Tower, a 154m Commercial tower with 38 floors.
- Maruti 360 Tower 1, a 153m Residential tower with 41 floors.
- Maruti 360 Tower 2, a 153m Residential tower with 41 floors.
- 42 Stories Residential project by ARK Infra.
- G+41 floor Residential project at Science park Shashasya one with 150m height.
- An iconic G+39 floor Mixed use building at Iscon circle with 162m height.
- 38 Stories Residential projects by joint 5 builders.
- 32 Stories Residential projects by Shanku Aristo 2 projects.
- 32 Stories Residential projects by Tremont and Adleap group 2 projects and 1 Commercial Building.
- 32 Stories Commercial project by Brillia Pravesh.
- 32 Stories Commercial project by Shilp business park.
- 32 Stories Residential and Commercial building by AG Highline.
- .G+22 Stories Palak estrella iscon at Ambli road with 88m height.
- 30 Stories Riverfront tower at Sabarmati riverfront with height 100m.
- G+20 Stories commercial project by Rashmi builders.
- G+24 Stories Residential Project at shilaj circle.
- G+34 Stories (2 towers) by The poddar reality group at Science Park, Shilaj with height 122m.
- .G+34 Stories by Aavkar Group at Adalaj.
- .G+18 Stories Swati 18 beside Palladium mall Thaltej with height 76m.
- .G+22 SHYASWA SAROVAR stand alone Residential tower at Nr Shilaj circle.
- G+25 floors The Park by HN SAFAL Stand alone Residential tower now on RERA with height 104m.
- 32 Stories Shypram stateland Science city road with height 122m.
- 30 stories Aristo amaya 130m iconic road sg highway

== Tallest proposed ==
Approved skyscraper 45 floors in Gota opposite Nirma university with 150m+ height.

== See also ==
- List of tallest buildings in India
- List of tallest buildings in different cities in India
- List of tallest structures in India
- List of tallest buildings and structures in the Indian subcontinent
