= Kankaria Lake =

Tourist place and lake in Ahmedabad, India

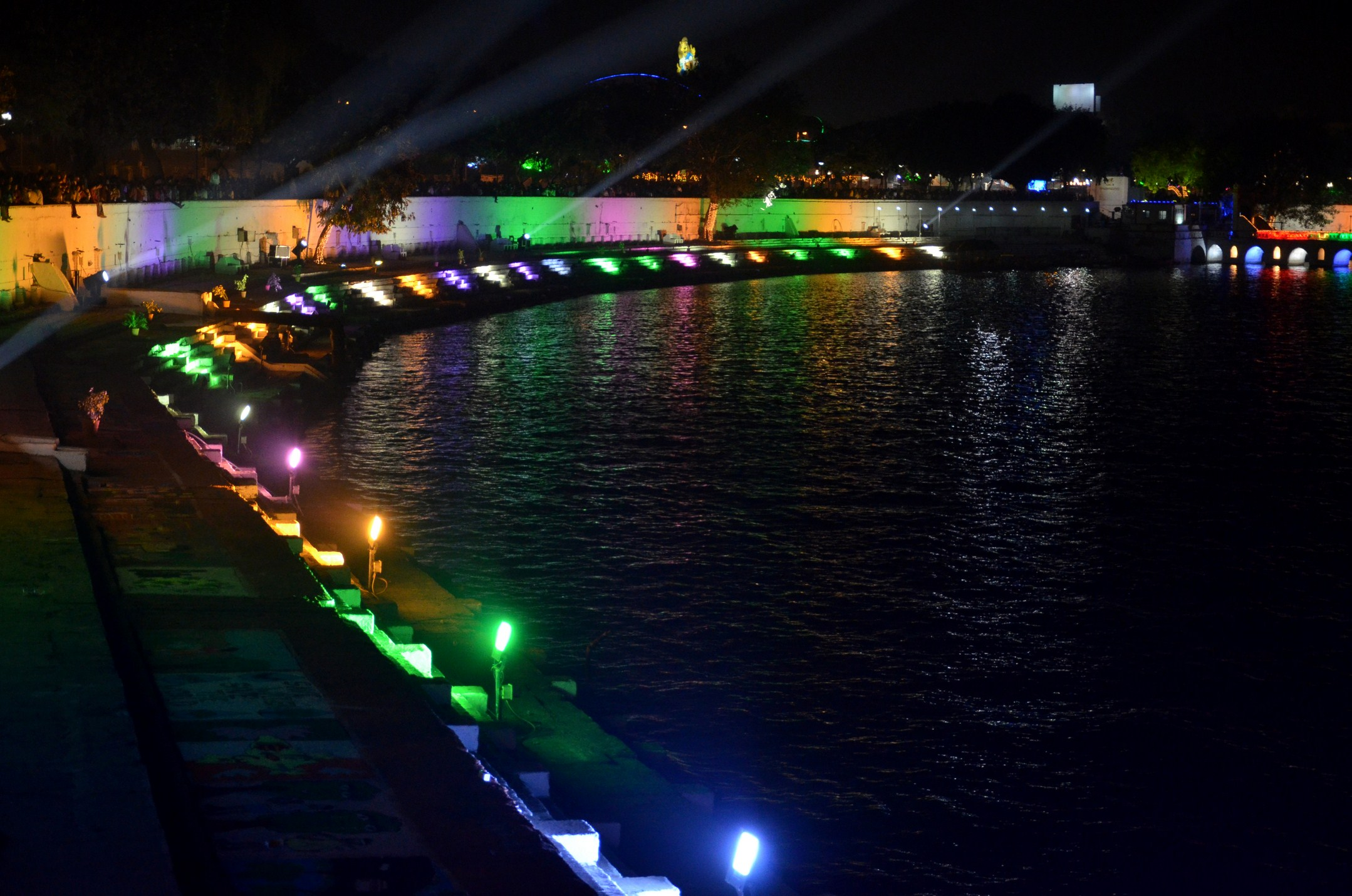
- Kankaria Lake during the Kankaria Carnival in Ahmedabad

- Location within Gujarat
- Interactive map of Kankaria Lake
- Location: Maninagar, Ahmedabad, Gujarat
- Coordinates: 23.006°N 72.6011°E
- Lake type: Artificial lake
- Primary inflows: Storm water and Narmada Canal
- Catchment area: 640,000 m^{2} (6,900,000 sq ft)
- Basin countries: India
- Max. length: 560 m (1,840 ft)
- Max. width: 560 m (1,840 ft)
- Surface area: 76 acres (31 ha)
- Average depth: 6 m (20 ft)
- Max. depth: 7 m (23 ft)
- Shore length^{1}: 2.25 km (1.40 mi)
- Islands: Nagina wadi
- Settlements: Ahmedabad
- ^{1} Shore length is not a well-defined measure.

Kankaria Lake is the largest lake in Ahmedabad in the Indian state of Gujarat. It is located in the southeastern part of the Ahmedabad, in the Maninagar area. A lakefront has been developed around it, featuring attractions such as a zoo, toy train, kids' city, tethered balloon rides, water rides, a water park, food stalls, and entertainment facilities. The lakefront was revamped in 2007–2008. Kankaria Carnival is a week-long festival held here in the last week of December. Many cultural, art, and social activities are organised during the carnival.

== Etymology ==
Several stories are told about the origin of the name Kankaria. One explanation suggests that the name is derived from the large quantities of limestone (kankar in Gujarati) dug out of it during excavation. Another story narrates that the Sultan Qutb-ud-Din asked the saint Shah Alam to select the site for the tank and the garden. The saint scattered some pebbles at the site which was excavated and the lake was built. Thus it was named Kankaria. Another story says the saint Hazrat-i-Shah Alam cut his foot on a pebble while passing through excavation and exclaimed, "What a pebble!" So it was named Kankaria (pebbly). It was mentioned as Hauj-e-Qutb (the tank of Qutb) after the Sultan Qutb-ud-Din in the inscription at Kankaria.

== History ==
Map of Kankaria lake and its amenities.

There are various versions of its origin. According to the 14th-century chronicler Merutunga, Chaulukya ruler Karna built a temple dedicated to the goddess Kochharba at Ashapalli after defeating the Bhil chief Asha. He also established the Karnavati city nearby, where he commissioned the Karneshvara/Karnamukteshwara and Jayantidevi temples. He also built the Karnasagara tank at Karnavati next to Karneshvara temple. Karnavati is identified with modern Ahmedabad and Karnasagar tank is identified with Kankaria lake but this identification is not certain.

The construction of the lake started by Sultan Muizz-ud-Din Muhammad Shah II in the 15th century. The inscription at the lake mentions that it was completed during the reign of Sultan Qutb-ud-Din Ahmad Shah II in 1451. According to this inscription, its name is placed as "Hauj-e-Qutb" (Pond of Qutb) after him.

Throughout the period of the Gujarat Sultanate and of Mughal rule, the Kankaria lake with its Nagina Bagh were the favourite leisure place of rulers and the people and it were among the tourist sights of Ahmedabad ever since. The European travellers of the 17th century, Pietro Della Valle (1623), Johan Albrecht de Mandelslo (1638), Jean de Thévenot (1666); all had visited the lake gave its accounts. Mandelslo who visited Gujarat during the reign of Mughal Emperor Shah Jahan wrote in 1638:

I went thence along a Sone Bridge, which is four hundred paces in length, to another Garden called Niccinabag (Nagina Baug), that is to say, the Jewel, and they say it was planted by a beautiful and rich young lady. The garden is not very great, no more than the house within it; but both are very advantageously seated in a place high enough to discover all the adjacent champion, and, upon the avenues of the Bridge, to make the noblest prospect that ever I saw. The rain which falls in the winter-time supplies a great fish-pond or pool in the middle of the garden. But in summer they make use of certain engines wherewith many oxen put together draw up the water out of wells which are so deep that they are never dry. A man can seldom go to this garden, but he shall find some young women bathing themselves; they will not permit the Indians should see them, but suffered us to come in and speak to them.

— Mandelslo's Travels into the Indies,

British artist James Forbes visited Ahmadabad in 1781 after the fall of Mughal Empire when Ahmedabad was under Maratha rule. He found the gardens at lake neglected, the summer-palace in ruins and the bridge with 48 stone arches connecting Nagina Baug island to the bank in dilapidated condition. He specially noted a species of palmyra in the Nagina Baug which is very uncommon. The tree grows in a straight stem very high and then spreading several branches with a tuft of spreading leaves at the end of each branch. It is still there. After a century, when Ahmedabad was under the British rule, the Kankaria lake was restored by the Collector of the district, Borradalle in 1872. A road was built from the Raipur gate to the lake. The high banks of the lake were organised and the trees were planted on them. Of the original arched bridge, a small portion was restored and the rest of length is made with earthen bank. In the island, the steps were restored on all four sides, the ancient well was cleared out, the fountain and the pleasure house were restored. the new pierced parapet wall built. In 1879, it was proposed to connect the lake with Khari river by 11 miles long canal and supply water to Chandola lake but it never materialised.

In 1928, Kankaria was declared protected under the Ancient Monuments Preservation Act.

The central garden and the walkway had been revamped and utilities are enhanced by Ahmedabad Municipal Corporation in 2007―2008. Upon completion of the renovation at the cost of ₹30 crore (equivalent to ₹99 crore or US$10 million in 2026), the lake was officially inaugurated on 25 December 2008 in a week long event known as Kankaria Carnival.

== Architecture ==
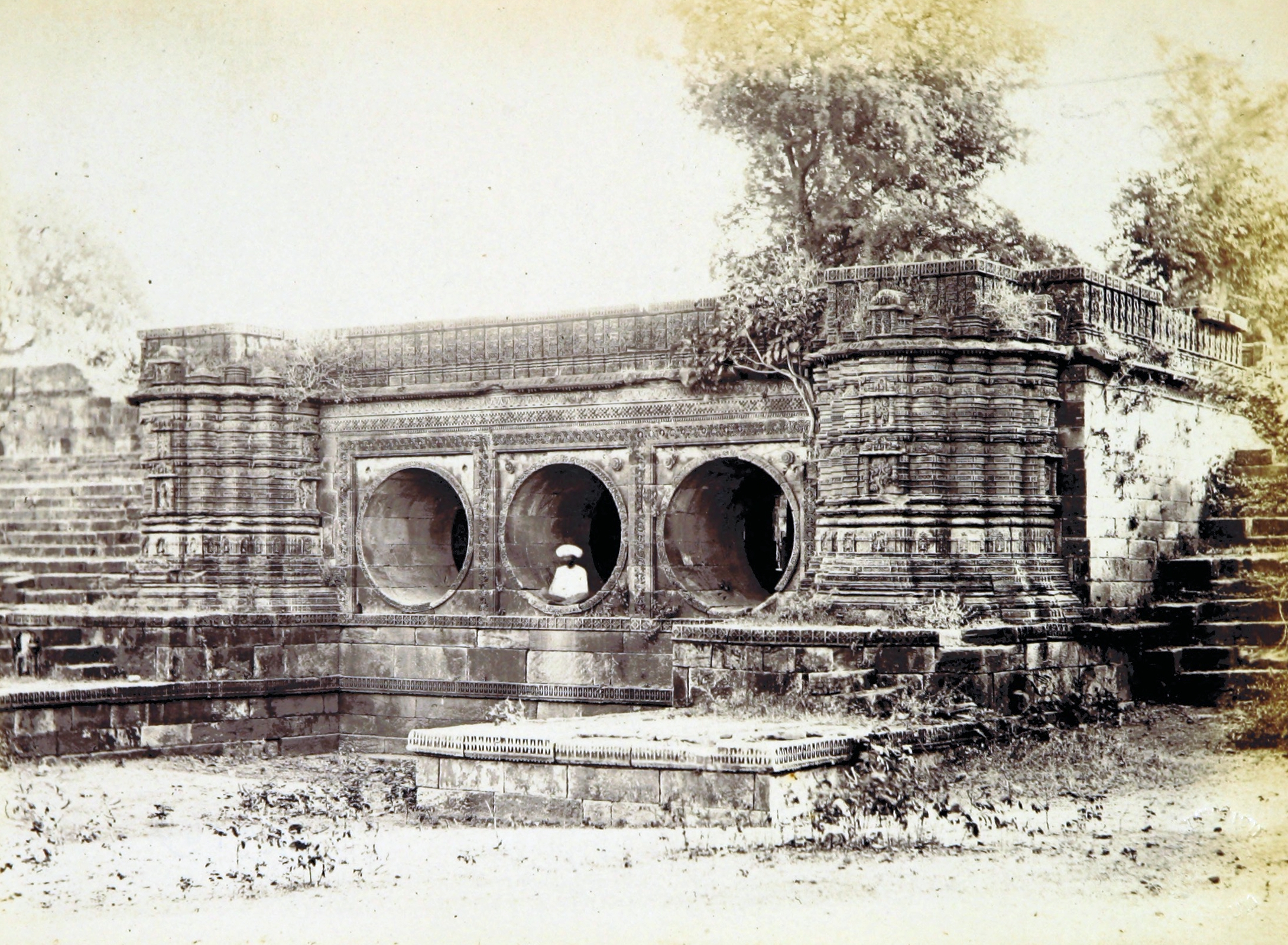
The supply sluice of Kankaria Lake, 1866

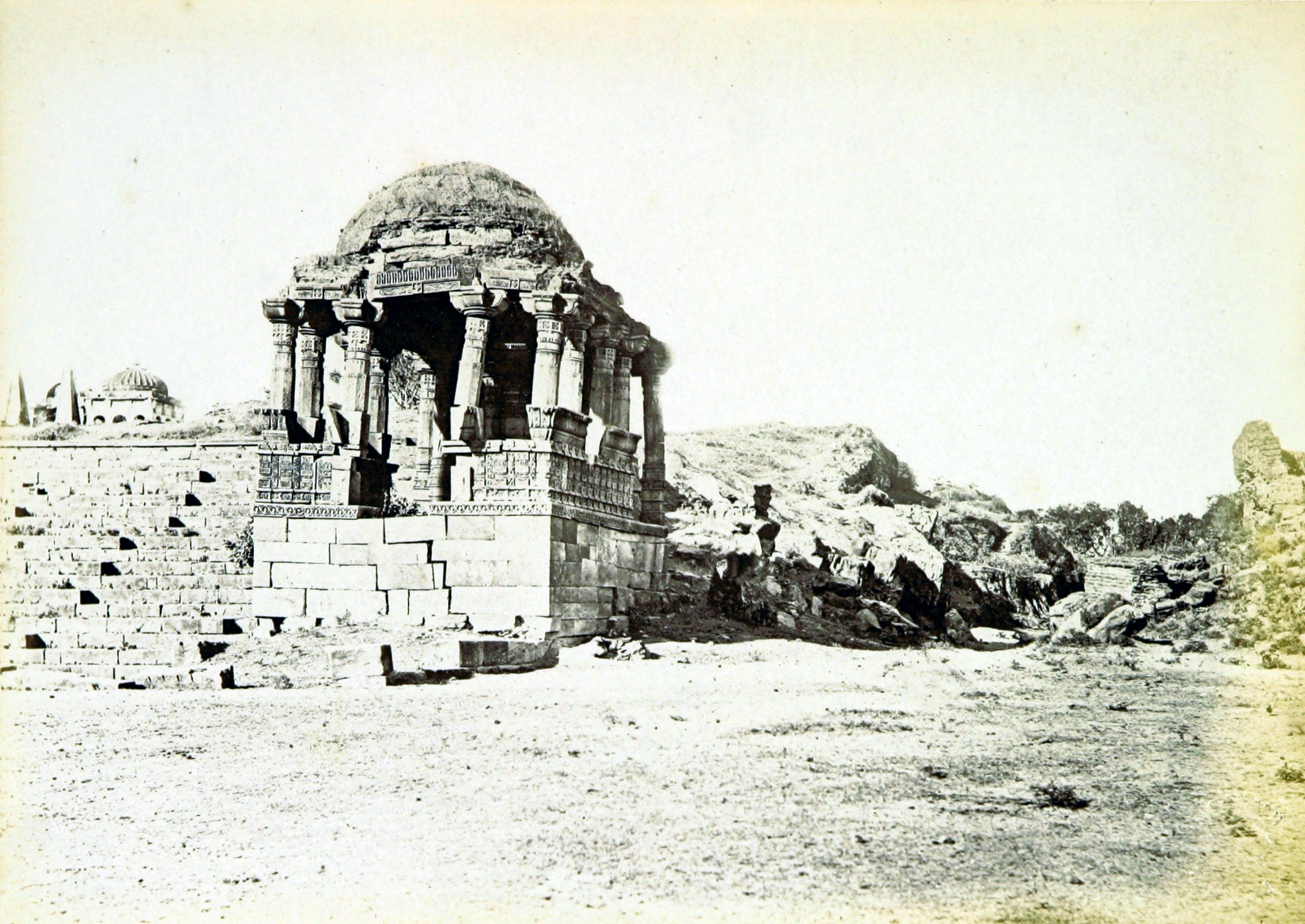
Cupola near one of the approaches of lake which no longer exists

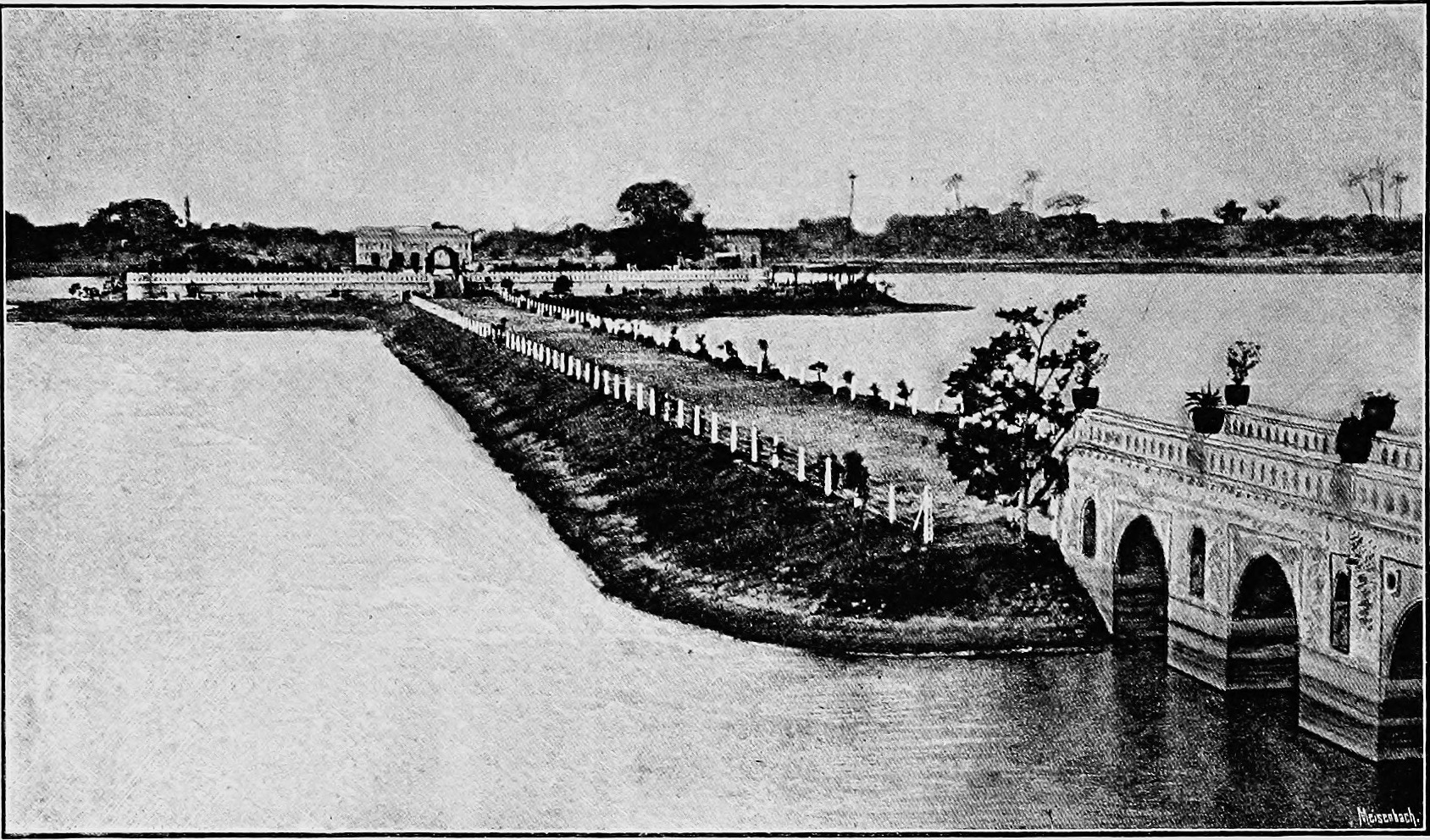
Viaduct to Naginawadi in 1891

The reservoir is a 34-sided regular polygon covering an area of 76 acres and having a shore length of approximately one and a quarter mile, or 2 km. It is surrounded by flights of cut stone steps and in six places, slopes, giving access to the water. These slopes were covered by square cupolas, each raised on 12 pillars.

An island in the centre of the lake contains a garden and is called Nagina Wadi, formerly Bagh-e-Nagina (beautiful garden in Urdu); it is connected to the bank by a bridge, originally of 48 arches. The garden is mentioned in Mirat-e-Ahmadi as "the Jewel (Nagina) in the centre of the ring of lake". The garden contains a pleasure house or summer palace called Ghattamandal. During restoration, the British constructed a parapet wall around the garden.

The lake had a water purification system which is lost now. There are well carved supply sluices on the east side. Their buttresses or jambs of sluices resemble those of the minarets of mosques in Ahmedabad. Between these buttresses, there is a screen six feet thick screen punctured by three large openings for inflow of water. These openings are six feet in diameter and the margin of it is beautifully carved.

== Attractions ==
=== Kankaria Zoo ===
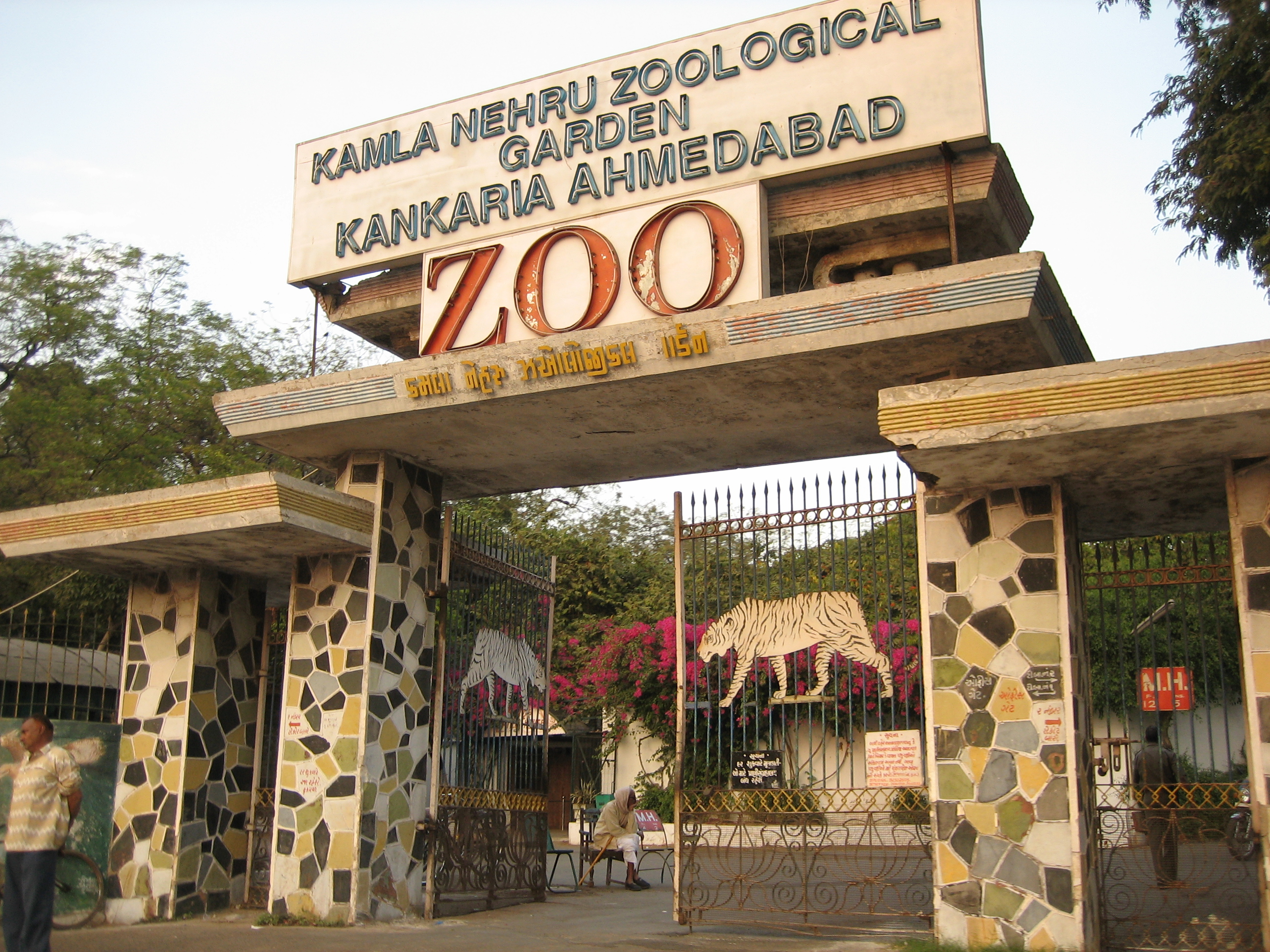
Kankaria Zoo

Kankaria Zoo, officially Kamla Nehru Zoological Garden, was established by Rueben David in 1951 spread over 21 acres. It was rated the best zoo in Asia in 1974. They have 450 mammals, 2,000 birds, 140 reptiles in a 31-acre zoo. It houses wild animals like tigers, lions, python, anaconda, snakes, elephants, albino (white) animals like the rhesus monkey, spotted deer, white blackbuck, chinkara, elephant, emu, jungle babbler, bush-quail and common palm civet. Kankaria Zoo has also bred of rare species like pythons, crocodiles, bearcats and wild asses. Reuben David was awarded the Padma Shri in 1974 for it.

=== Balvatika ===
Balvatika is a children's park named after Jawaharlal Nehru and was opened in 1956. Balvatika had a boat house, playroom, butterfly and weapon displays, mirror house, toy house and planetarium. Following renovation at a cost of ₹22 crore (US$2.3 million), it was reopened in July 2025. It has Gujarat’s tallest glass tower, a maze, dinosaur park, wax museum, illusion house, go-karting, mud ride, selfie zones, landscaped gardens and glow stations.

=== Amusement park ===
Netherlands based company installed five rides in the amusement park in 2014. It includes the Boomerang Roller Coaster, the Flipping Arm, the Torching Tower, Disk 'O' pendulum and the merry-go-round. It will also have a kids play zone for computer games. On 14 July 2019, the pendulum arm of the attraction snapped, causing the seated end of the attraction to slam into the ride's base and fall 20 feet to the ground, killing 2 and injuring 29.

=== Kids City ===
Kids City is a miniature world designed for kids. It is spread in 4240 sq.metre area having 18 activity centres including banks, fire station, science lab, radio station, police station, court room and prison, dental as well as medical hospital, theatre, BRTS, heritage gallery, town governance, IT centre, News room, ice-cream factory, etc. AMC had applied for copyrights and patents on the individual games in the premises, the unique point system, Virmo (Virtual Money) and the design of the different venues in games.

=== Toy Trains ===
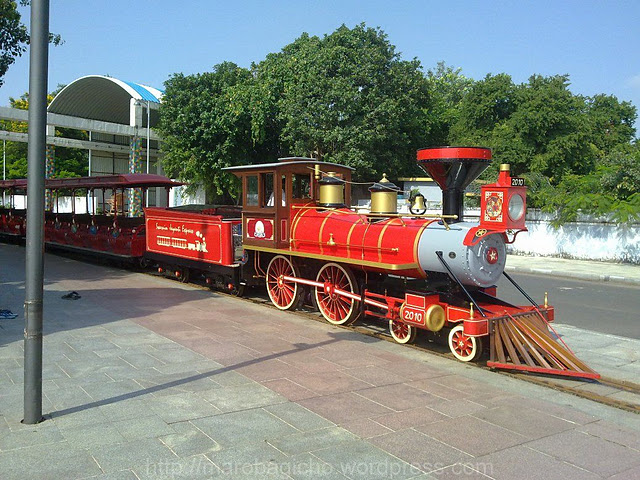
Atal Express - Toy Train

A train named Atal Express (Named after Atal Bihari Vajpayee on his birthday 25 December 2008) was imported from London, the train circles the lake on a 4.5 km track at a speed of 10 km/h with capacity of 150 passengers. The train has the capacity to carry 150 passengers, including 36 adults. The train is manufactured by Severn Lamb. During the first 11 months of introducing the train, it attracted nearly a million visitors. After the success of this train, another train was also started which named Swarnim Jayanti Express. All trains on the railway, and hence the railway itself, are 2 ft (610 mm) narrow gauge. In 2018, a third toy train, was put into service. It is based on a E5 series bullet train that is planned to run on the Mumbai–Ahmedabad HSR.

=== Balloon Safari ===
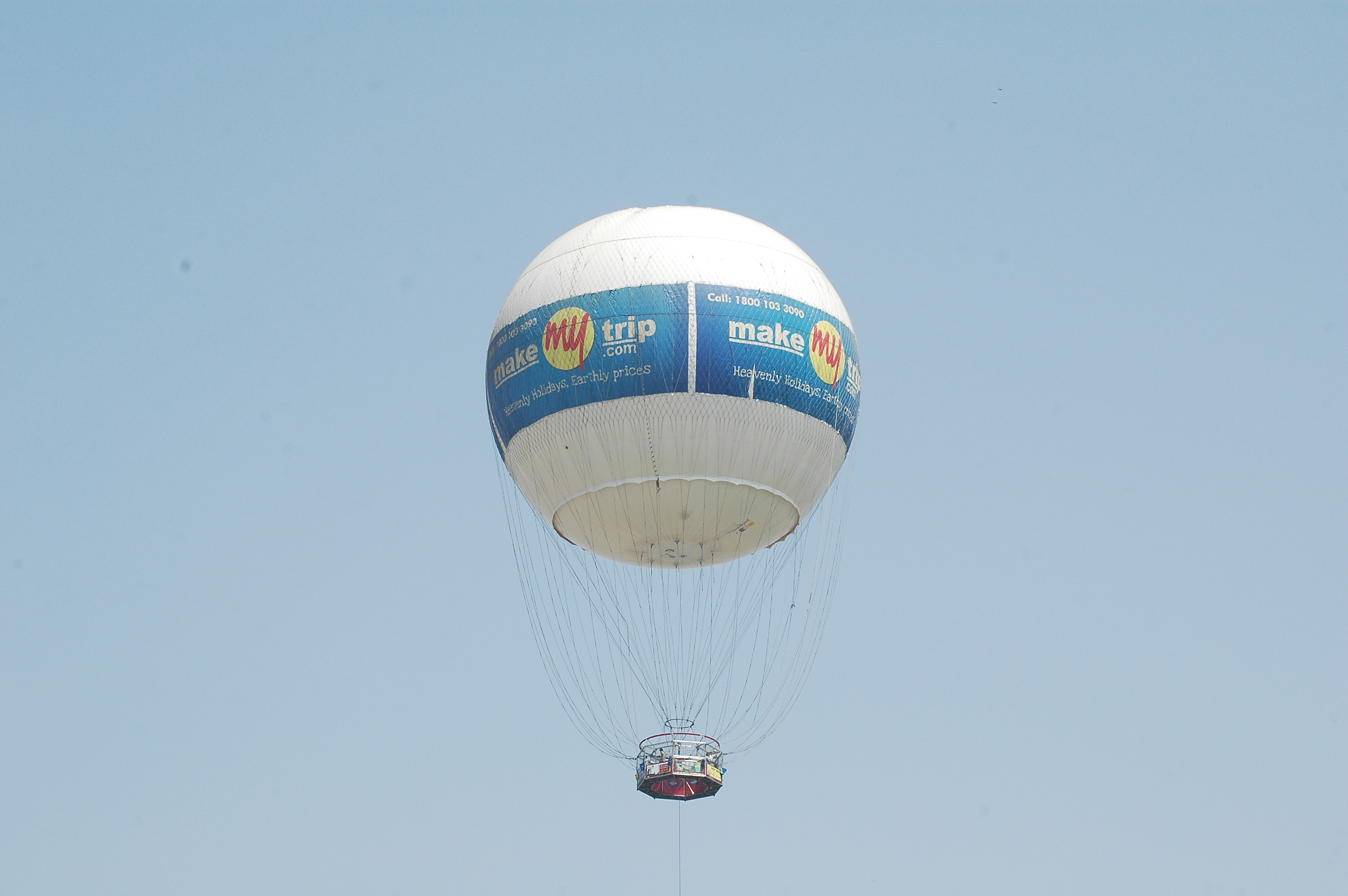
Tethered helium balloon

Ahmedabad Eye is a tethered balloon ride set up near Kankaria Lake after renovation. The tethered balloon complex spread over 3000 square yard, is divided into four sections including a restaurant, tethered balloon, heritage exhibit and an exhibition displaying the making of the Ahmedabad Eye. SKYZ is a balloon themed restaurant located at the Ahmedabad Eye complex. It is managed by Ahmedabad Municipal Corporation. Rainforest theme restaurant is also there.

=== Nagina Wadi ===
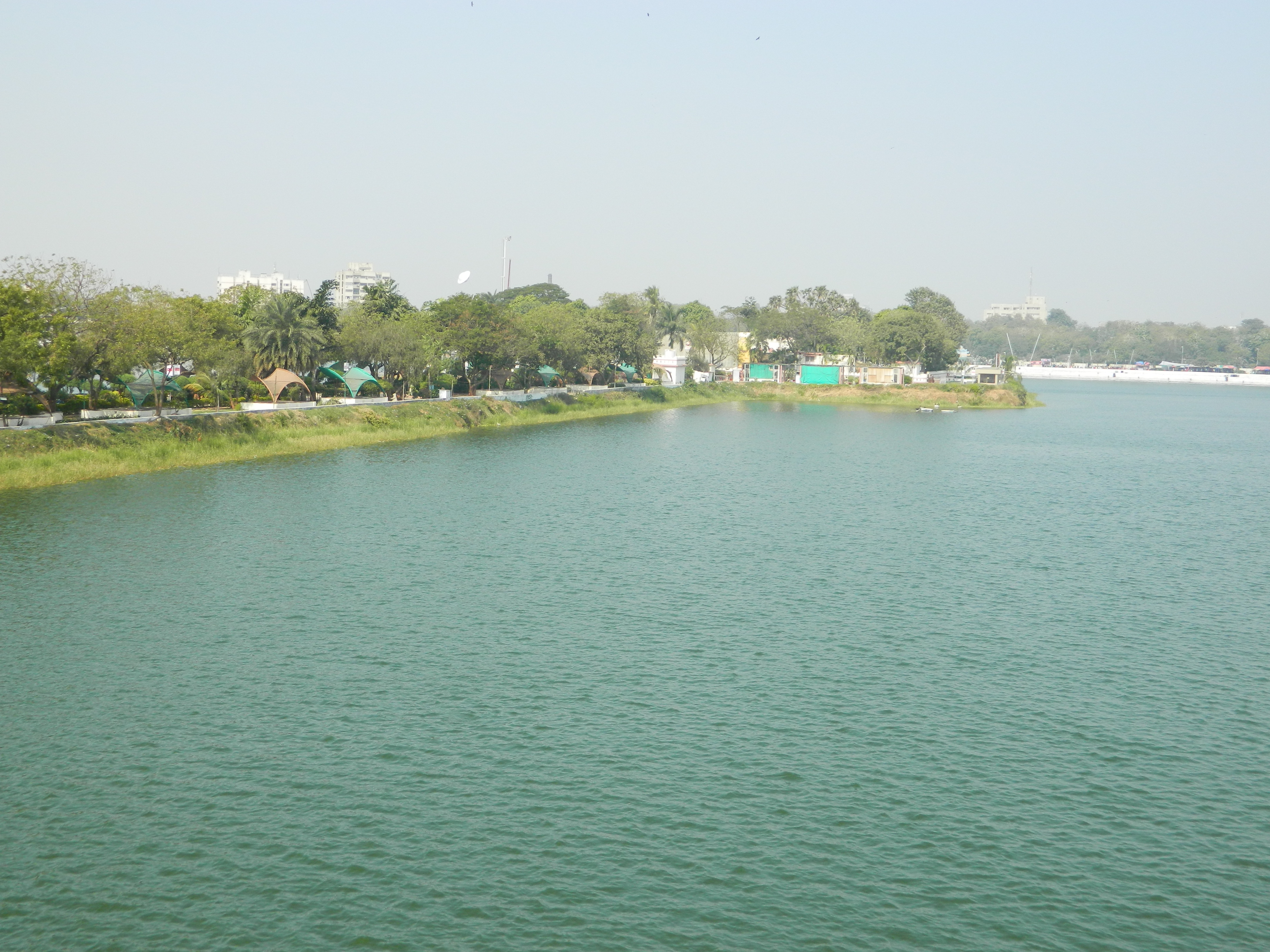
Nagina Wadi island

Nagina Wadi is an island in center of Kankaria Lake. It houses a small summer palace originally built for Mughal royals. Nagina Wadi is accessed by a straight, tree-lined walkway traversing half of the lake. In 2009, Ahmedabad Municipal Corporation and Amrapali Group built a musical fountain with multicolored laser lights which are displayed during the night. Food stalls are also there.

=== Stone Mural Park ===
India's biggest Stone Mural Park named Gurjar Gaurav Gatha on the side walls of the circular lake in which sculptors are depicting, in pink sandstone, the history and rise of Gujarat is under construction. It has murals covering 3150 sq feet depicting the history of Ahmedabad right now but when completed, it will measure 6000 feet in length and will be world's largest mural (30000 sq.metre).

The following subjects are being included in murals: folklores and history of Ahmedabad, great rulers of Gujarat, ports, commerce and good practices (ethical business-trade traditions), education, freedom fight, cultural heritage, art and literature, expression of culture, today's Gujarat, global Gujaratis, selected stories of common Gujaratis in past centuries. It will also includes stories about ancient sage Dadhichi, Mahatma Gandhi, Sardar Patel, Jhaverchand Meghani and Indulal Yagnik.

=== Dutch and Armenian tombs ===
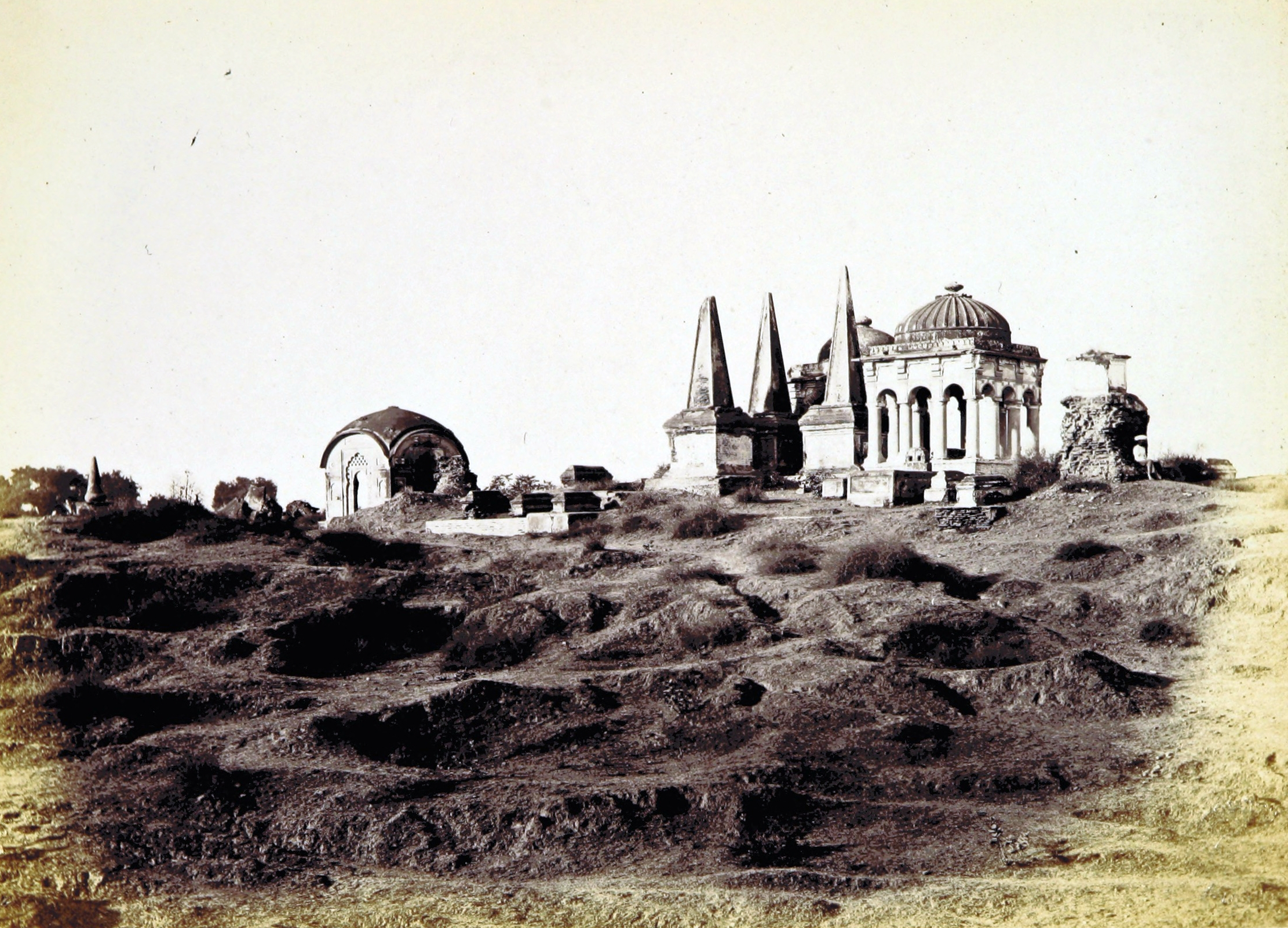
Dutch Tombs near Kankaria lake, 1866

The Dutch and Armenian tombs are on One Tree Hill embankment which shows the strong trade presence of the Dutch East India Company in the city during the 17th century. They are Saracenic in style with domes and pillars. The dates of the tombs are deciphered which range from 1641 to 1699. The Armenian tombs perhaps belonged to brokers in the Dutch factory.

=== Joyrides ===
Segways are introduced for people for easy movement around lake. A mini golf course; Aqua Kart and other water sports; Vertical Swing, Paint Ball Shooting, Black Flash and rides, Sky Fly and other joyrides were introduced.

=== Other ===
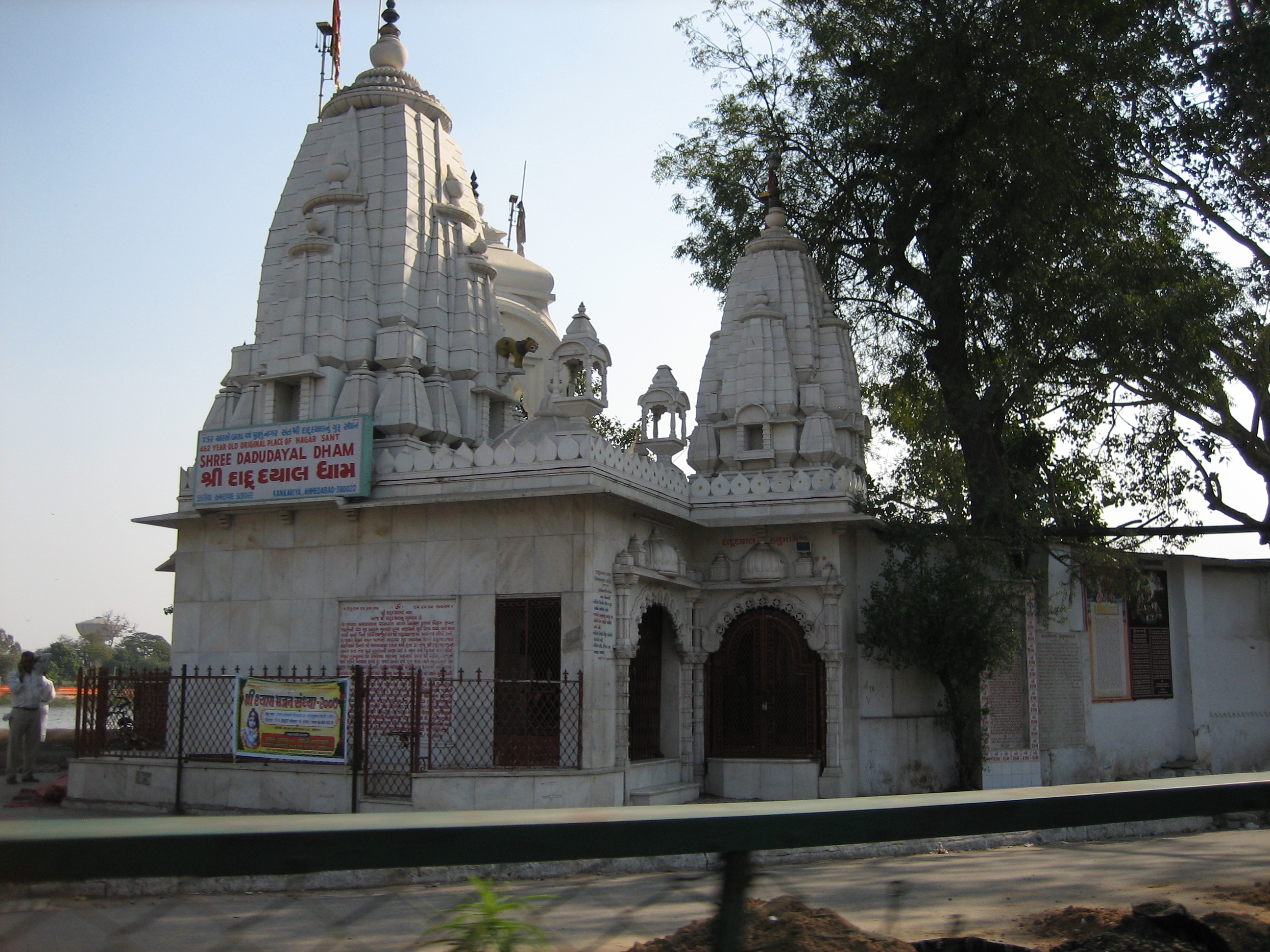
Dadu Dayal temple

Other attractions include the historical Dadu Dayal temple, Natural History Museum, desert safari, aquarium, gardens like One Tree Hill garden, Butterfly Park, football ground, water sports and rides, open-air theatre, Jaldhara water park, boating and small amusement park. It is a good place for yoga, walking, and running, especially early morning. There is also a gym on campus known as Ambubhai Purani Vyayamshala.

== Kankaria Carnival ==
Kankaria Carnival is an annual week-long cultural festival organised in last week of December since 2008. The festival include art, dance and music performances, social awareness programmes, games and activities for children.

== See also ==
- Chharodi Lake
- Chandola Lake
- Vastrapur Lake
- Thol Lake
