= Vastrapur Lake =

Lake in India

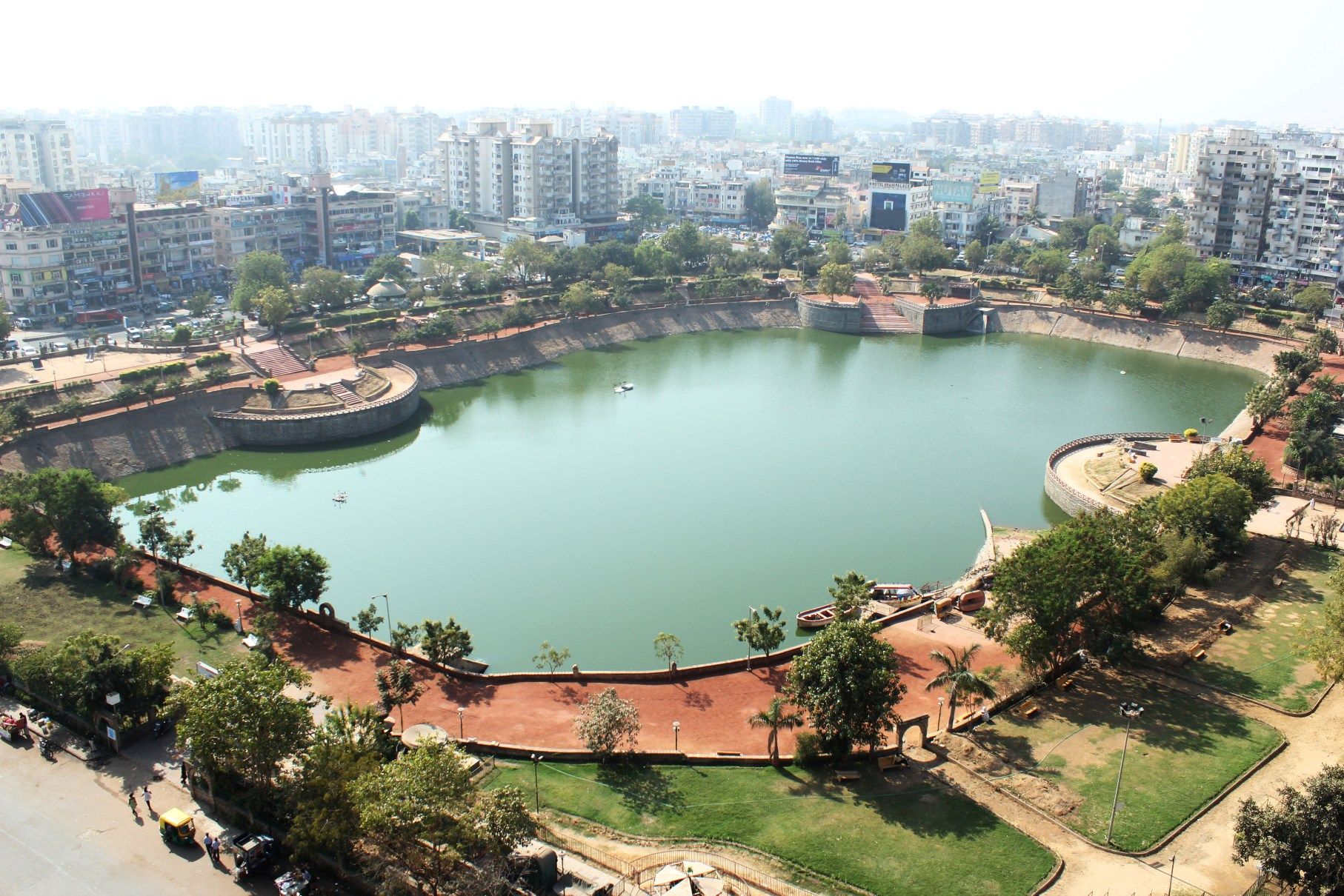
- Map
- Location: Ahmedabad, Gujarat
- Coordinates: 23°02′18″N 72°31′44″E

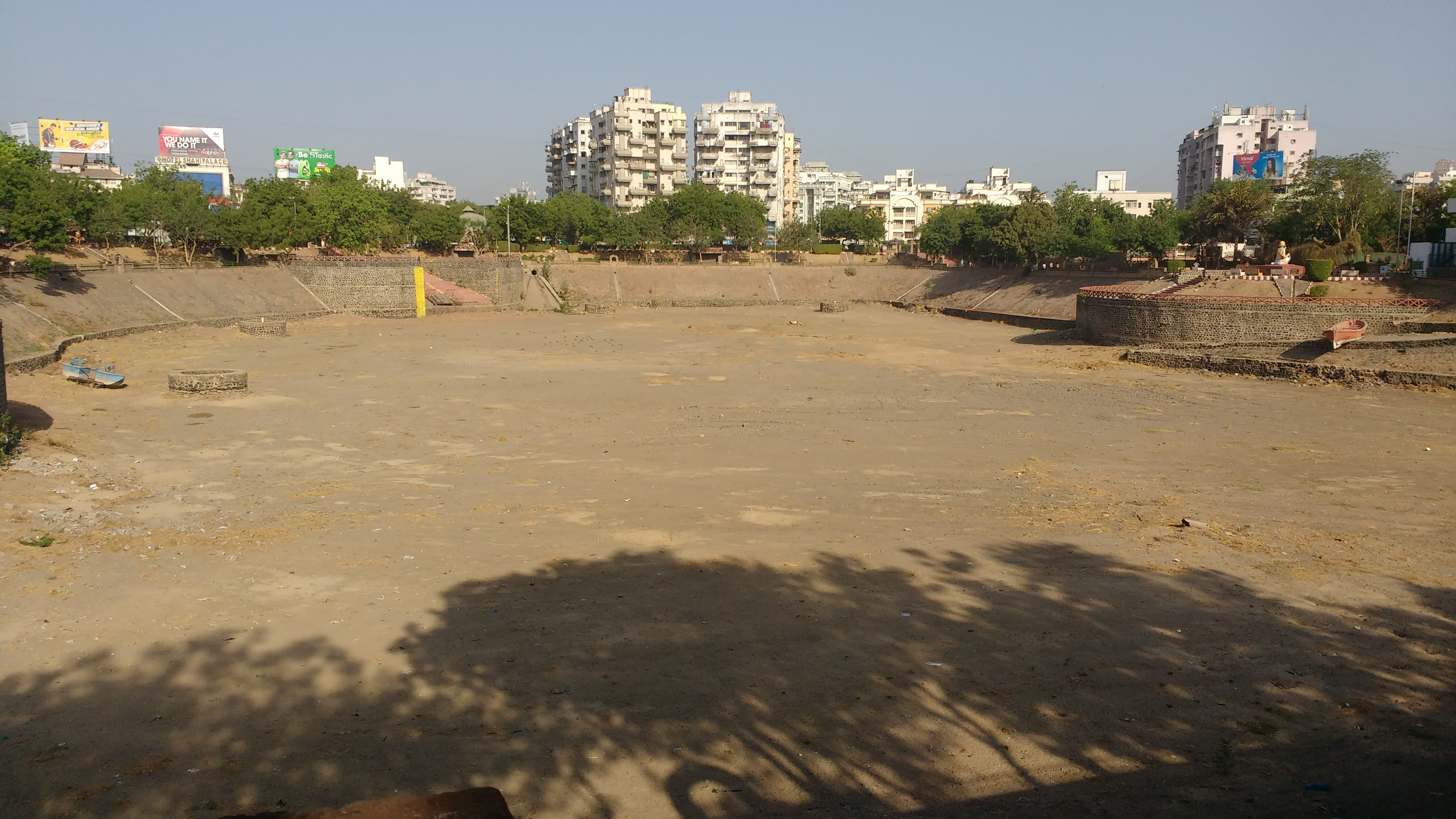
Vastrapur Lake, 2017

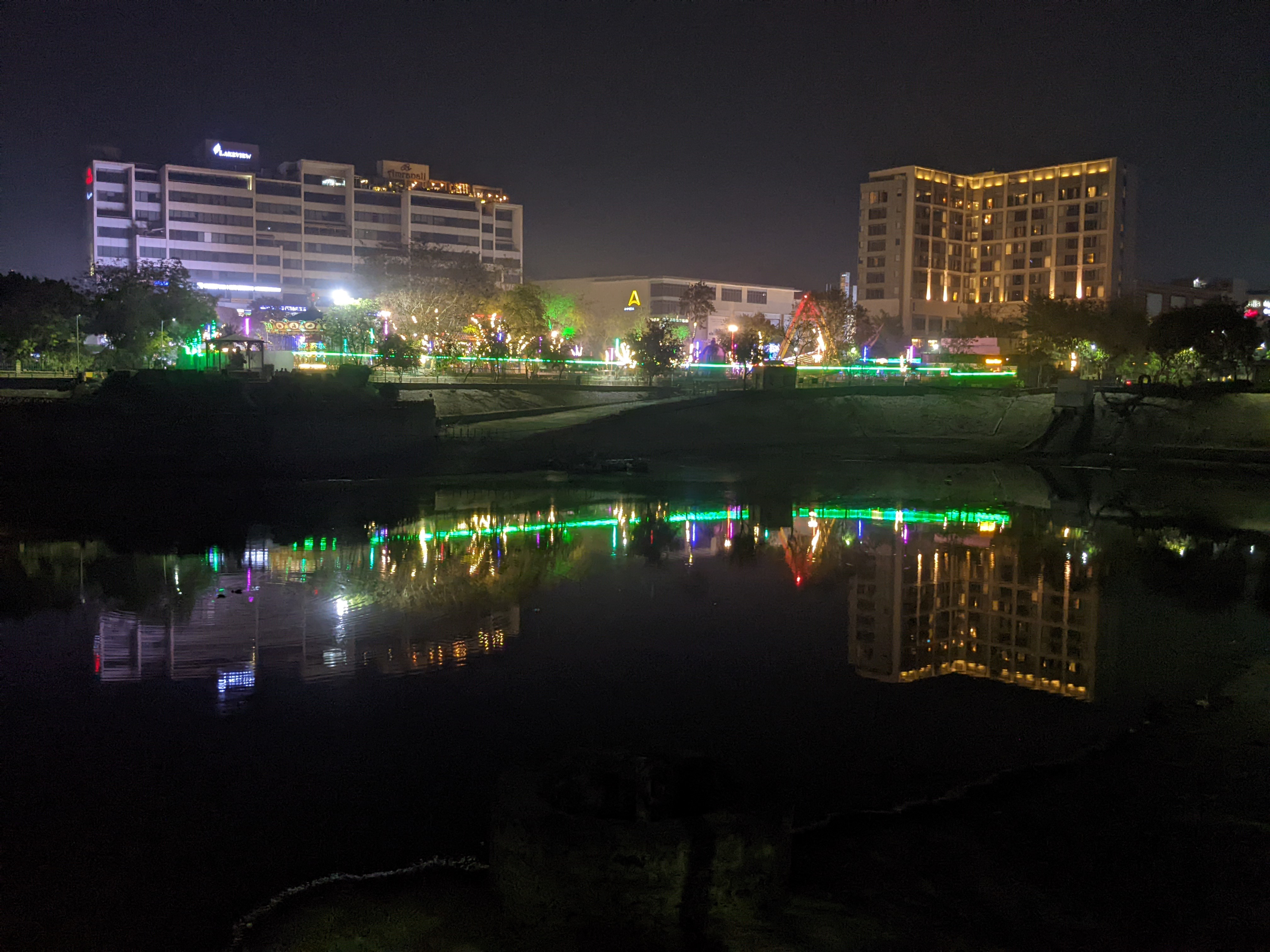
View from Vastrapur Lake in 2022

Vastrapur Lake, officially Bhakta Kavi Narsinh Mehta Lake, is situated in western part of Ahmedabad in the Indian state of Gujarat. It is officially named after Narsinh Mehta.

== History ==
The lake was beautified by the Ahmedabad Municipal Corporation (AMC) after 2002 and has since become a popular spot in the city.

At times, the water from Narmada River is allowed to flow into this lake. The lake is surrounded by pretty gardens with much stonework.

In 2013, Vastrapur lake was renamed to 'Bhakt Kavi Narsinh Mehta Sarovar' in memory of Narsinh Mehta whose statue was installed in the garden of the lake.

In 2016, the lake almost dried up. People removed dead fish, and moved surviving fish elsewhere.

In September 2019, AMC planned to fill the lake with Narmada River water.

== Features ==
Many people visit this lake. It currently boasts an open-air theater and children's park. There is a 600 m pathway around the lake which serves many walkers and joggers in the early mornings and in the evenings. Fitness equipment is also available.

The lush green lawns surrounding this lake also serve as a central hub of Ahmedabad, wherein various cultural events take place regularly.

== See also ==
- Kankaria Lake
- Chandola Lake
- Thol Lake
