= Sarkhej–Gandhinagar Highway =

Road in India

Sarkhej – Gandhinagar Highway
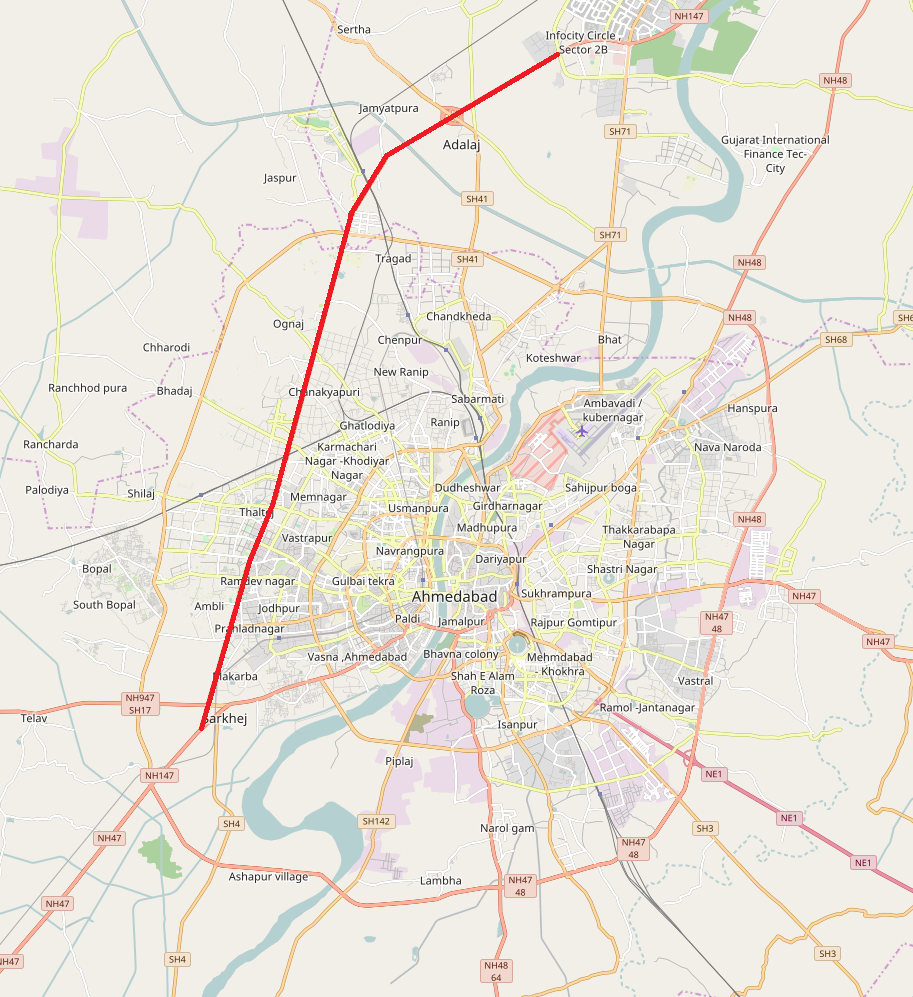
- Highway Map

Route information
- Maintained by Government of Gujarat
- Length: 44.5 km (27.7 mi)
- Existed: 2002–present

Major junctions
- Southwest end: Sarkhej
- North end: Gandhinagar

Location
- Country: India
- States: Gujarat

Highway system
- Roads in India; Expressways; National; State; Asian

The Sarkhej–Gandhinagar Highway, colloquially the S.G. Road or S.G. Highway, connects the city of Ahmedabad with Gandhinagar, the capital of the state of Gujarat, India. It forms a major part of NH 147, which connects Sarkhej with Chiloda near Gandhinagar. It is a major artery road for commercial and public transport, and is witnessing a major construction boom along its route towards Gandhinagar.

== History ==
The highway was primarily built as a mean to bypass traffic from the city centre of Ahmedabad. But lower land prices led to a boom in real estate and the retail industry. Presently, prices of land within the vicinity of the highway are more comparable to those in downtown areas. It has emerged as a hub for educational, entertainment and corporate parks.

In 2015, the National Highways Authority of India transferred administrative control of the highway to the Government of Gujarat.

== Transportation ==
The highway is dotted with Ahmedabad Municipal Transport Service (AMTS) bus stops, which connect the highway with the interior of the city. AMTS has also started a feeder air conditioning bus service in association with Airports Authority of India, connecting Sardar Vallabhbhai Patel International Airport with the city, with its last stop at Karnavati Club on the Sarkhej–Gandhinagar Highway.

It is estimated that a minimum of one lakh PCUs (passenger car units) travels per day on this highway. And, during the festivals and on Mondays and Tuesdays, there is a sharp jump in the volume of traffic.

In 2015, Ahmedabad Municipal Corporation (AMC) started earmarking paid parking spots for various categories of vehicles on 4.7 km stretch between Karnavati Club and Hebatpur-Sola on the Highway, where a number of offices and shopping complexes are located.

== Landmarks ==
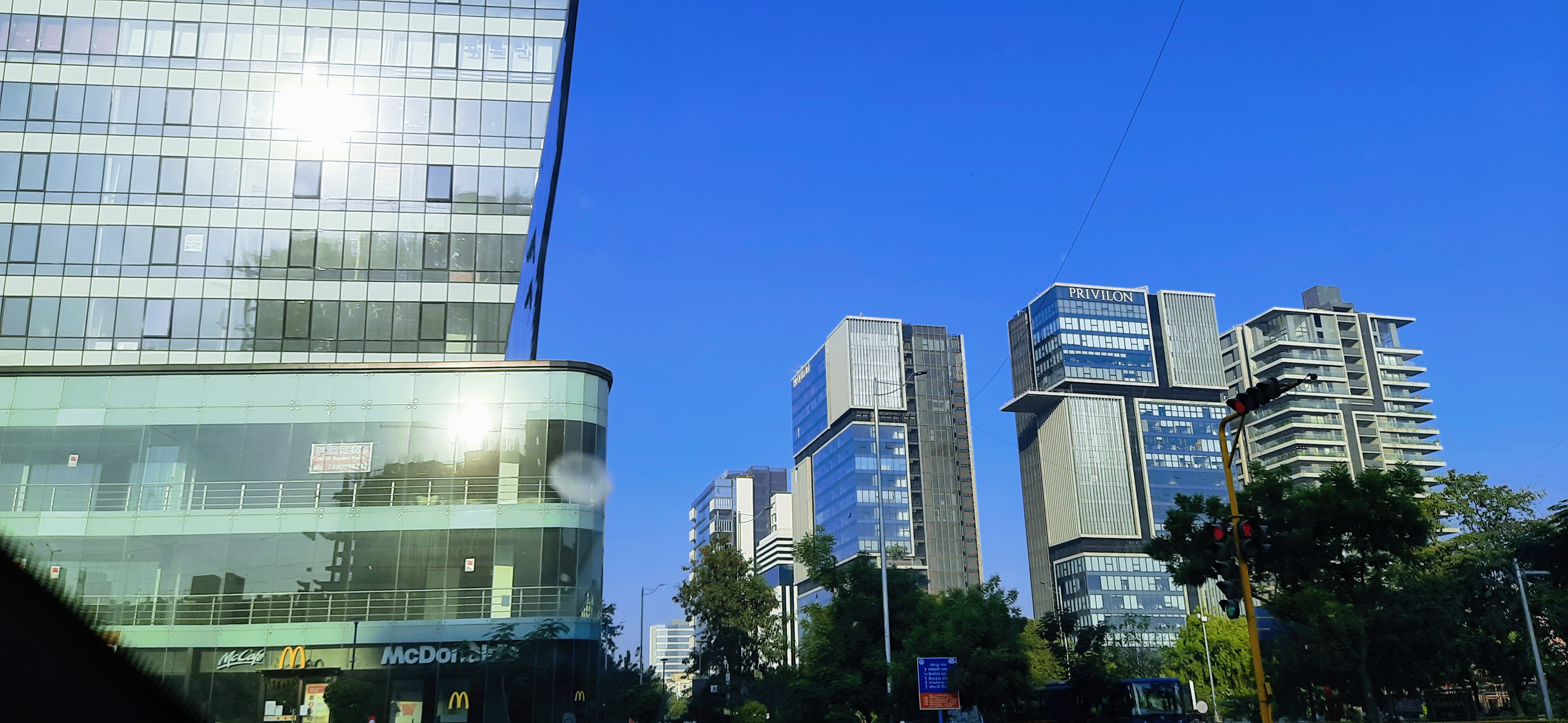
Corporate towers lining the SG Highway.

The highway is dotted with large-scale retail outlets like Lifestyle, Globus, Croma, and Westside. Various automotive dealership showrooms including Porsche, BMW, Audi, Triumph, Jaguar, Land Rover, Range Rover, Nissan, Volvo, Toyota, Rolls-Royce, Harley-Davidson, Honda, Skoda, Jeep, Ducati and Mercedes are located on this road.

=== Government institutions ===
- Gujarat High Court

=== Religious institutions ===
- Gobindham Gurudwara
- ISKCON Temple
- Vasihnodevi Temple
- Adalaj

=== Educational institutions and research centres ===
- Consumer Education and Research Centre
- Chimanbhai Patel Institute Of Management & Research
- National Institute of Pharmaceutical Education and Research (NIPER) Ahmedabad Campus
- SGVP International School
- Sola Bhagvat Vidhyapith
- Silver Oak University
- Nirma University
- L. J. Campus

=== Hospitals ===
- Sola Civil Hospital
- Zydus Hospital
- KD Hospital
- HCG Cancer Center

=== Corporate institutions and parks ===
- GNFC Tower
- Intas Biopharmaceuticals Corporate Office
- Mondeal Square
- Mondeal Heights
- Shapath IV
- Shapath V
- Titanium One
- Titanium Plaza
- TTEC
- Signature 1
- Zydus Corporate Park (ZCP)

=== Entertainment centres ===
- Acropolis Mall
- Crowne Plaza Ahmedabad
- ISCON Mall
- Karnavati Club
- Novotel Ahmedabad
- Rajpath Club
- The Grand Bhagwati
- YMCA International Centre
- Palladium Ahmedabad Mall
- Swagat Holiday Mall

=== Public places ===
- Chharodi Lake
- Adalaj ki Vav

== Future developments ==
- On 7 July 2017, the Ministry of Road Transport and Highways has sanctioned INR 7 billion for the development of 44 km stretch of the highway.
- Currently as of October 2024 the new elevated flyover is to be construct from YMCA club to Karnavati club to reduce the traffic and emission.

== In popular culture ==
- Mahesh Babu starrer 2013 Seethamma Vakitlo Sirimalle Chettu (Telugu Film) was shot near Cinemax Multiplex, within the vicinity of the highway.

== Accidents ==
The Times of India reports during 22 July 2023 a significant increase in road traffic accidents on SG Road in Ahmedabad, India, according to data from emergency service provider EMRI 108. The 2022–23 period saw an average of eight accidents daily, a 65% rise from the previous year. This surge has led to a doubling of ambulance services in the area. The high accident rate is attributed to SG Road's nature as a city-passing highway with heavy converging traffic and higher average vehicle speeds. Implementing speed calming measures, proper signage, lane demarcation, and adequate lighting are suggested as potential solutions to reduce accidents.

- A fatal incident occurred on Ahmedabad's ISKCON Bridge when a vehicle, driven by Tathya Patel, struck a crowd that had gathered due to a previous collision, resulting in nine deaths. Following the tragic event, Patel was promptly arrested by local authorities.

== Gallery ==
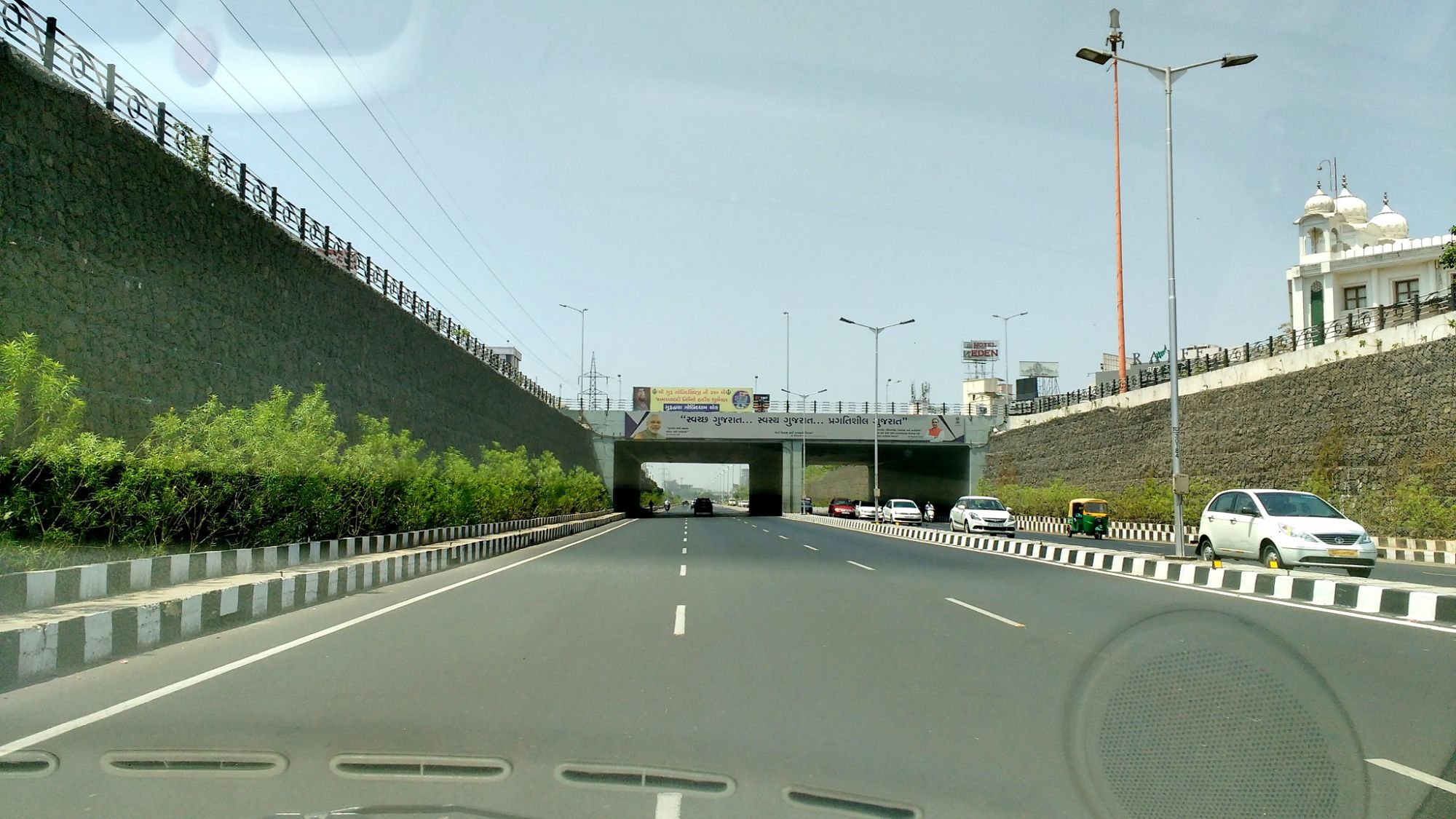
The Thaltej Underpass

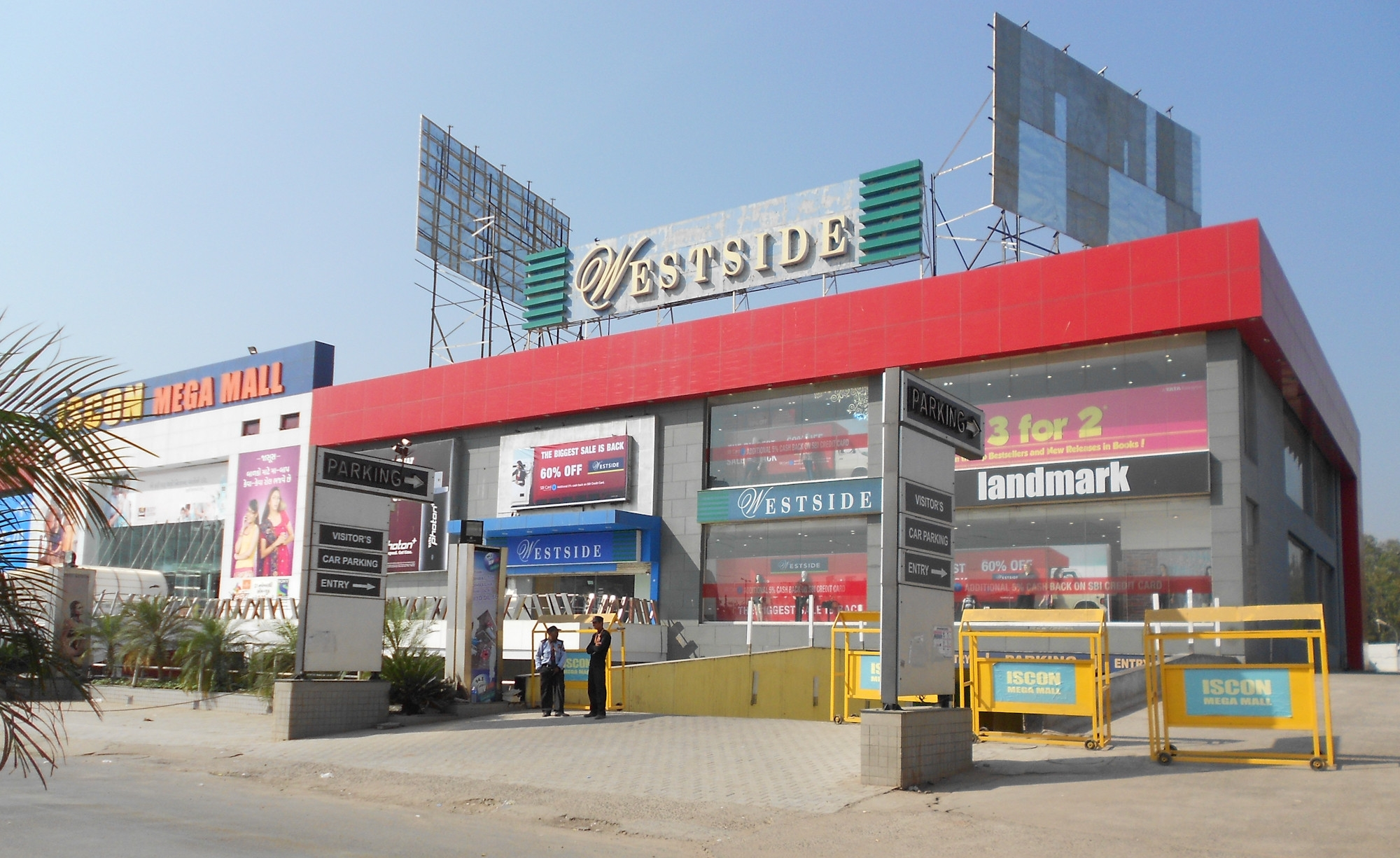
ISCON Mega Mall

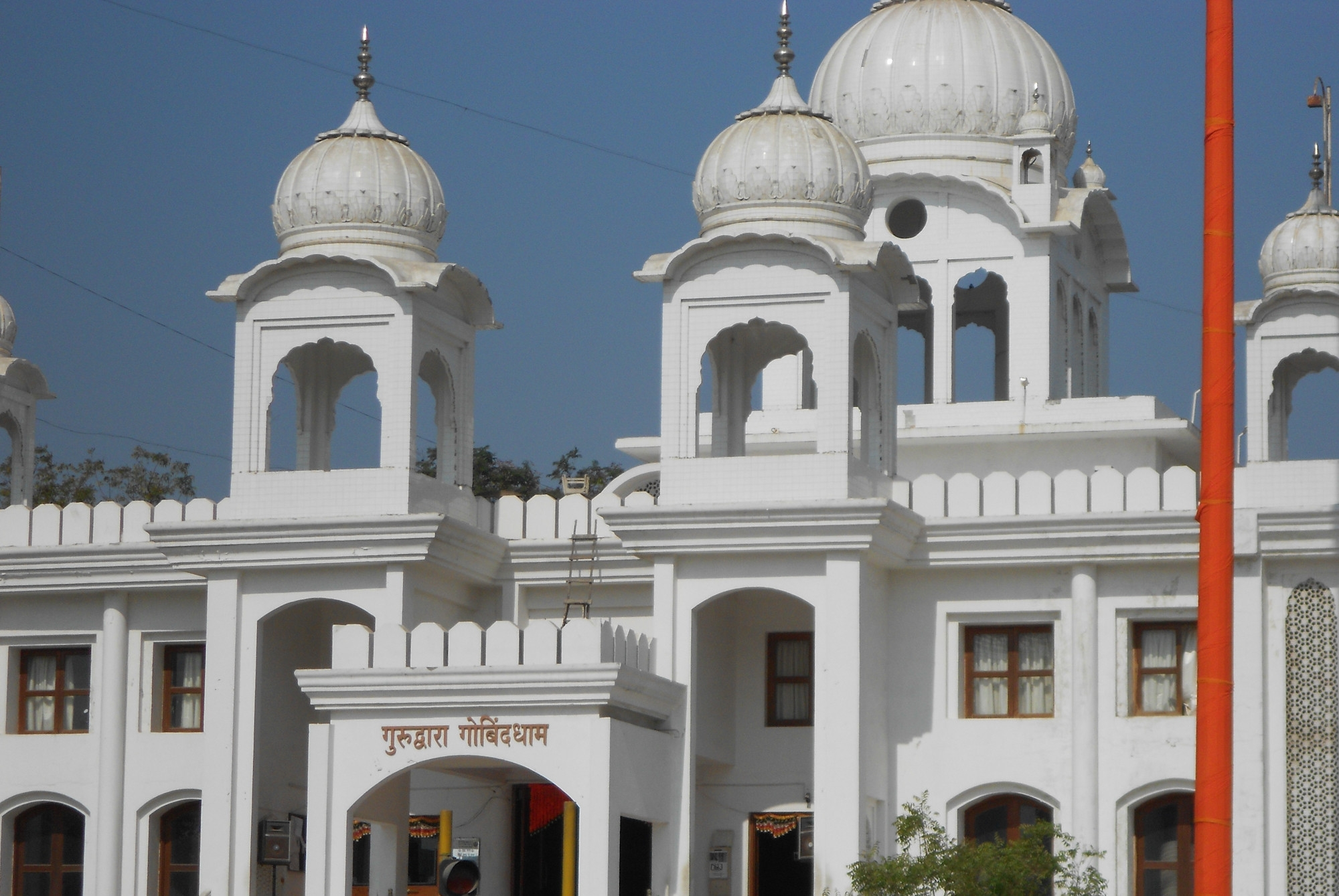
Gobindham Gurudwara

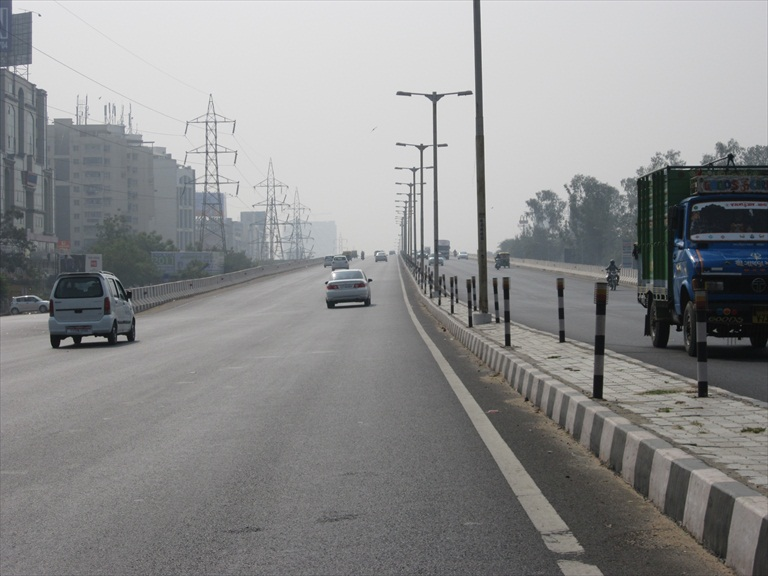
ISKCON Flyover
