= Kadi, India =

Kadi mehsana
- Town
- Nickname: Kadi Sona Ni Dadi
- Location in Gujarat, India Kadi (India)
- Coordinates: 23.30088°N 72.33218°E
- Country: India
- State: Gujarat
- District: Mehsana
- Elevation: 56 m (184 ft)

Population (2011)
  - Total: 81,404

Languages
  - Official: Gujarati, Hindi
- Time zone: UTC+5:30 (IST)
- PIN: 382715
- Telephone code: +91-2764
- Vehicle registration: GJ-02
- Website: gujarat.gov.in

Kadi is a town and a municipality in Mehsana district in the Indian state of Gujarat.

== General information ==
- Geographic Location : 23.18°N 72.2°E.
- Weather : Normal
- Total Numbers of Villages : 120
- Population : Total - 260934, Men - 135723, Women - 125211
- Literacy : Average - 65.8%, Men - 78.55%, Women - 52.02%
- Crops : Sorghum, Cotton, Wheat, Mustard Seeds, Cumin Seeds etc.
- Domestic Animals : Cows, buffaloes, camels, donkeys, goats etc.
- Minerals : Oil & Natural Gas
- Railway : 15 km
- Roads : State Highways, Panchayat Roads etc.
- Industries : Cotton processing, Cotton seed processing, Cotton oil Refineries, Ceramic industry and many more.
- Tourist Points: Meladi mata temple, Malhavrav Fort, Umiya mata temple, Narmada Canal diversion, Municipal Garden, Malji Bhagat ni Vav, Oghadnath Mahadev temple, Dasiya pir dargah, maneksha bawa dargah, and Balapir bava ki dargah. Thol Lake, 22 km from Kadi, is known as a bird sanctuary where many birds from other countries used to arrive in winter.
- Schools : Shanti International School ,Bhavkunj School, Noble School Vidhya Mandir Primary and Higher Secondary School, Sheth R.H. High school & R.C.Patel higher secondary school, Merda-Adraj, Sarva Vidhyalaya Kelavani Mandal, Adarsh Vidhyalay, Zaveri High School,
- Hospital : Bhagyoday Hospital, Devansh ICU and medical hospital, Block Health Office, Sneh Children Hospital And Nicu, Rhythm Medical And Heart Hospital, Maruti Hospital And Test Tube Baby Centre, Krishna Hospital.
- Green vegetable market : In Kadi there is a wide green vegetable market and starts trading by early morning and mostly stops before noon, almost green vegetable seller come from nearer villages and sell in bulk quantity at lower price. Lemon is available in large quantities at lower price, because of high number of plants in the nearby villages.
- Middle class business center : This city is very popular for shopping cloths as well as jewelry (ornaments) around the time of any festivals or weddings.
- local news paper

Kurukshetra, (wed) All the best, (fri) Weekend news, (thu) Sanpark shetu, (sat) Jayraaj, (sun)

== Gallery ==
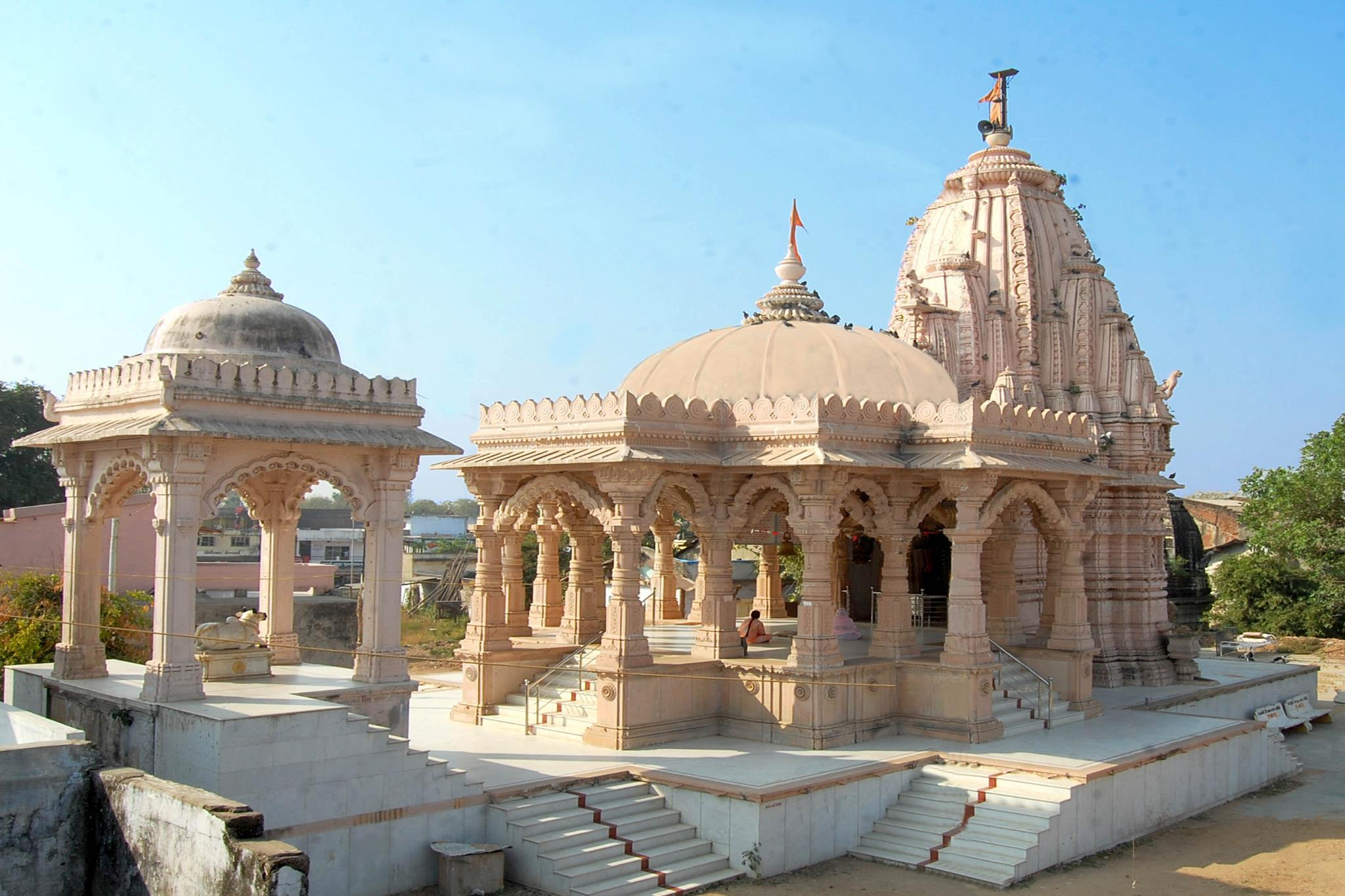
Yavteshwar Mahadev, Kadi

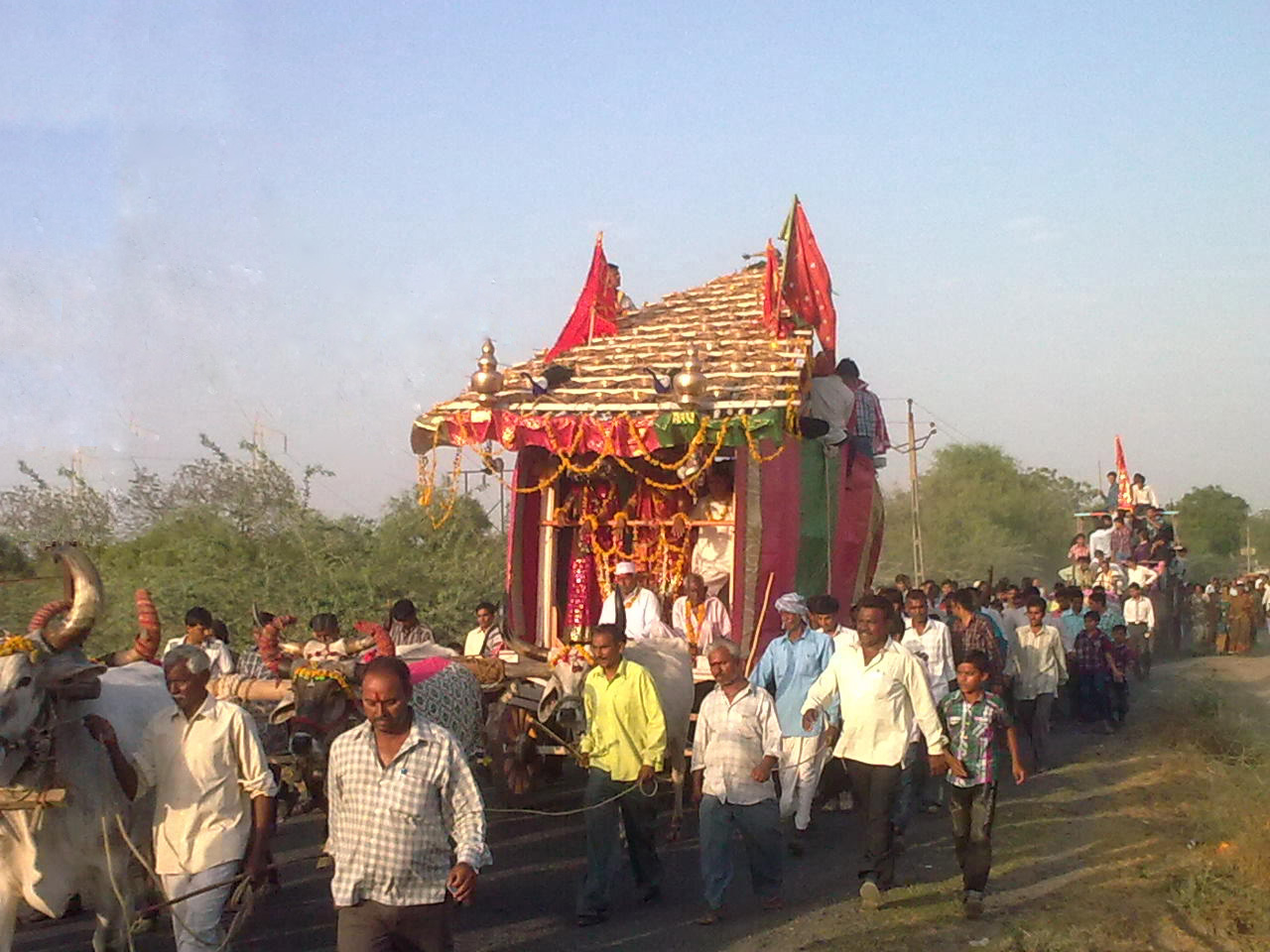
Festival of Khavad

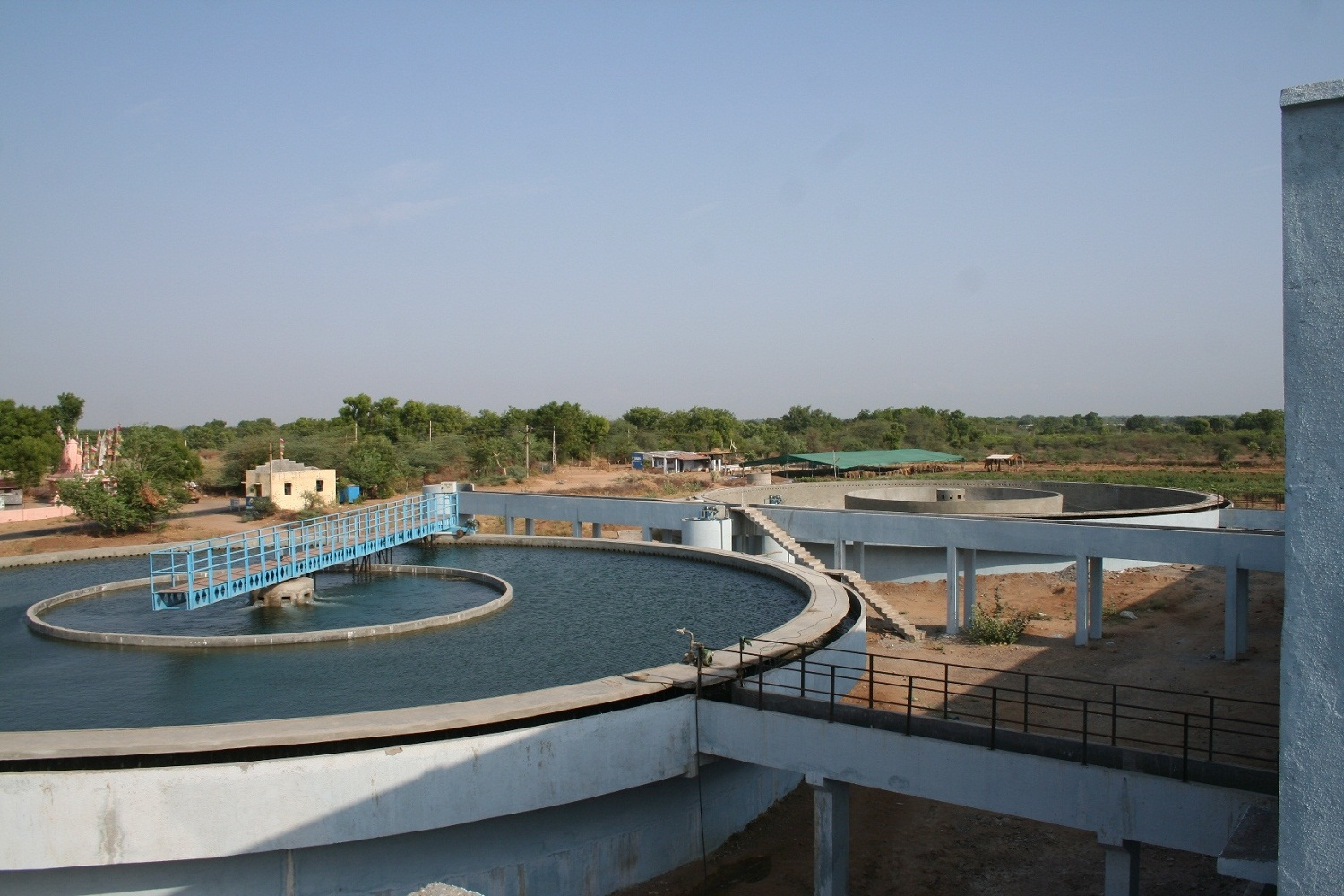
Water Purification Project near Kadi

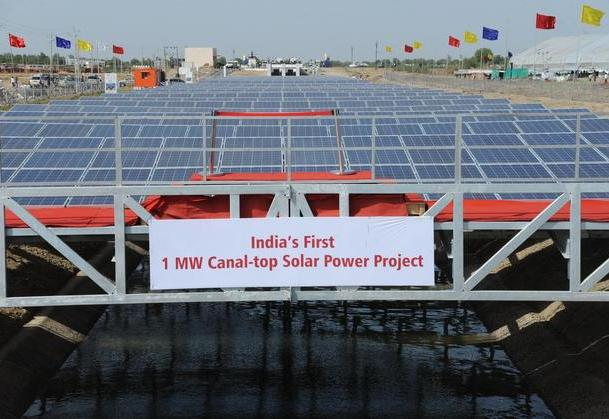
India's First Canal Top Solar Power Plant near Kadi

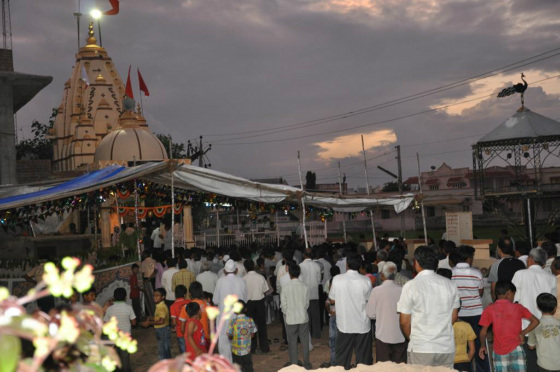
Someshwar Temple

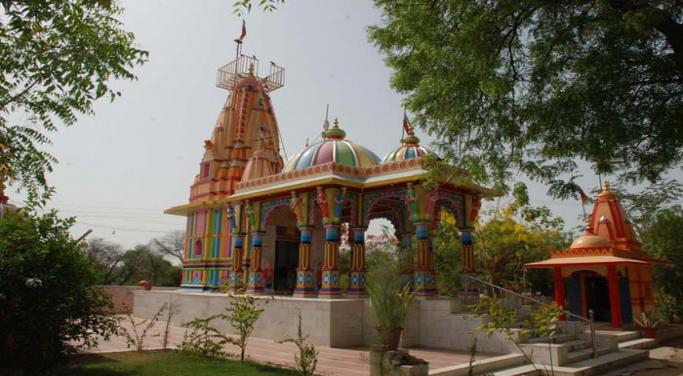
Malguru Maharaj ni Vav
