= Chandola Lake =

Lake in Ahmedabad, India

Coordinates: 22.987°N 72.587°E

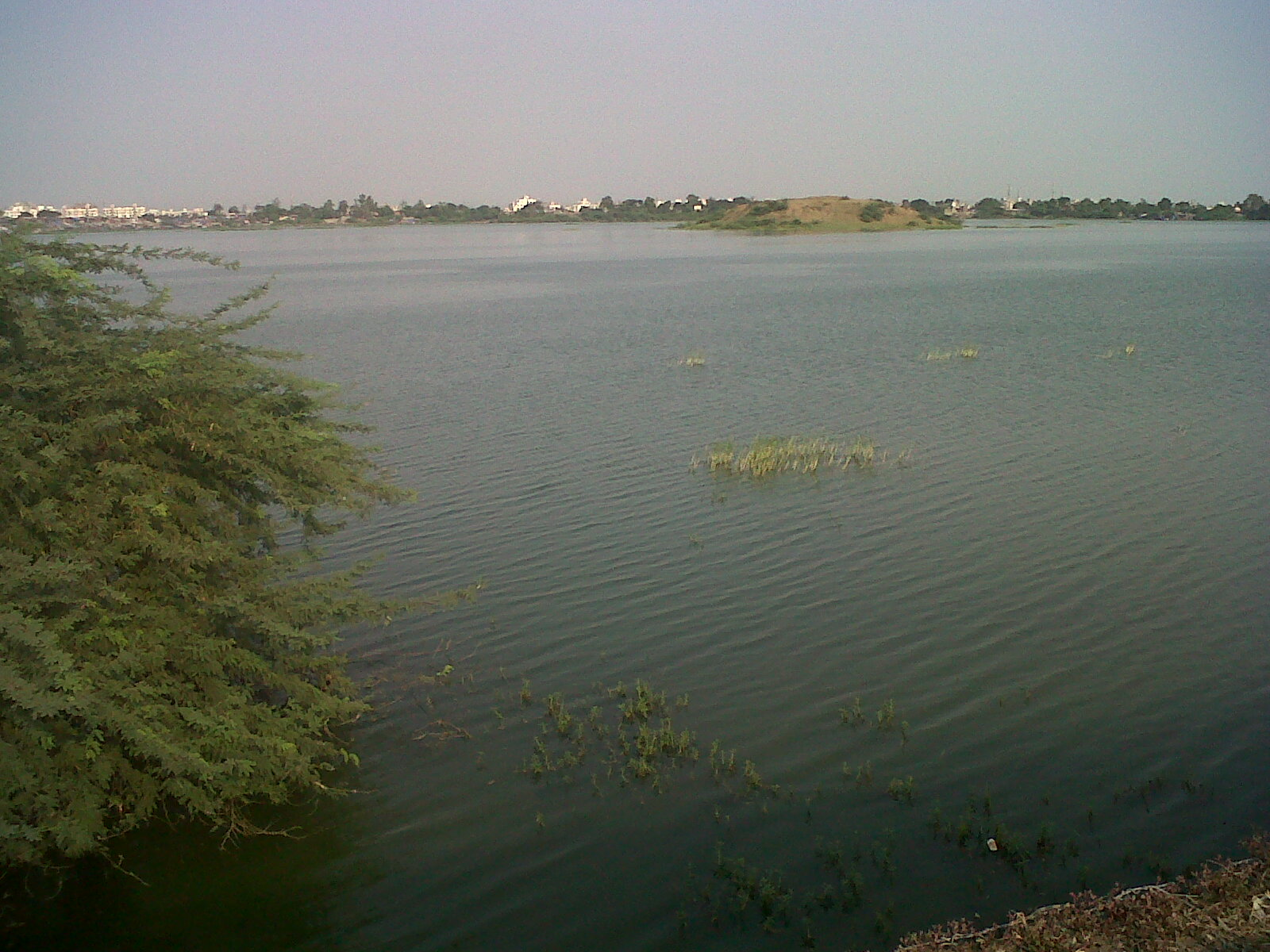
Chandola Lake Photo

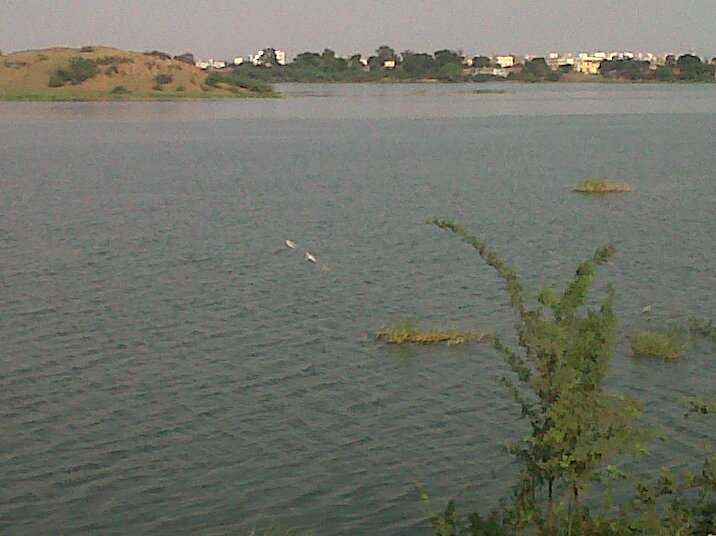
chandola lake photo

Chandola Lake is located near Dani Limda Road, Ahmedabad, Gujarat state, India and covers an area of 1200 hectares. It is a water reservoir, embanked and circular in form. It is also home for cormorants, painted storks and spoonbill birds. During the evening time, many people visit this place and take a leisure stroll.

== History ==
Chandola Lake was in existence when Asha Bhil founded Ashaval.

The historic Salt March around nine in the morning, after covering a distance of seven miles from the Sabarmati Ashram and a few minutes after the trucks and the taxis carrying radio and print journalists had disappeared down the road, had reached the Chandola Lake. Mahatma Gandhi had stopped under a large pipal tree next to the lake, no bigger than a small pond in the middle of a vast expanse of mud during March, 1930.

== Usage ==
Water from this lake is used for irrigation and industrial purposes. It is also being used for agriculture, as well as for other purposes like processing of waste oil and plastics.

The Kharicut Canal Scheme which is one of the oldest irrigation schemes of Gujarat was constructed with the main purpose of providing irrigation to 1,200 acres of rice land near Chandola lake in Ahmedabad.

== Pollution and encroachment ==
Large-scale encroachment have been built on this water body. Kharicut, the lake’s feeder canal is choked with filth and garbage.

On 29 April 2025, a mega demolition was carried out by the Ahmedabad Municipal Corporation at Chandola Lake, in which a large amount of government land was vacated by removing many illegal encroachments. A large number of police personnel were also present at the time of this demolition. It was also reported that illegal Bangladeshis had established a colony here.

== Chandola Lake Development Plans ==
The Ahmedabad Municipal Corporation (AMC) has ambitious plans for developing Chandola lake in a big way. AMC has also drawn an exhaustive plan for the upkeep of Chandola lake, which till now was a neglected public space. The AMC has tendered jobs for cleaning and sanitation activities to be carried out around Chandola. The civic body has earmarked Rs 3.70 lakh for clearing the garbage from the lake.

== See also ==
- Kankaria Lake
- Vastrapur Lake
- Thol Lake
