= Sarkhej =

- neighbourhood
- Location in Ahmedabad, Gujarat, India Sarkhej (Gujarat) Sarkhej (India)
- Coordinates: 22°59′0″N 72°30′0″E
- Country: India
- State: Gujarat
- District: Ahmedabad

Languages
  - Official: Gujarati, Hindi
- Time zone: UTC+5:30 (IST)
- PIN: 382210
- Vehicle registration: GJ
- City: Ahmedabad
- Website: gujaratindia.com

Sarkhej is a suburban neighbourhood in the city of Ahmedabad. It is primarily known for the Sarkhej Roza, an architectural complex located 8 km south from the city centre. One of the most important roads of metropolitan Ahmedabad, Sarkhej–Gandhinagar Highway, originates from Sarkhej and ends at the twin city Gandhinagar

== Public Transport ==
The Gujarat State Road Transport Corporation runs a circular bus service along the Sardar Patel Ring Road from Sarkhej on an hourly basis. Also Sarkhej Railway Station is present which is one of the important Railway Station of Ahmedabad and it is well connected with Anand, Ankleshwar, Bhavnagar Terminus, Botad, Godhra, Junagadh, Nadiad, Vadodara, Surat, , Veraval (Somnath), Vapi, Banaras and Mumbai.
