= Chiloda (Naroda) =

Nana chiloda Nana Chiloda, New Shahibaug, Chiloda CT, Chiloda(naroda)
- city
- Nickname: Chiloda(Naroda)
- Location in Gujarat, India Nana chiloda (India)
- Coordinates: 23.10749317492071°N 72.66013390134155°E
- Country: India
- State: Gujarat
- District: Gandhinagar

Languages
  - Official: Gujarati, Sindhi, Hindi
- Time zone: UTC+5:30 (IST)
- Vehicle registration: GJ 01
- Website: gandhinagar.gov.in

Nana Chiloda, also known as Chiloda(Naroda), is a town in Gandhinagar in the state of Gujarat, India.

== Demographic and Geographic ==
Nana Chiloda is an urban area in the Ahmedabad district of Gujarat, India. It is located about 10 kilometers from the center of Ahmedabad. The area is bounded by the Sabarmati River and SP Ring Road.

Nana Chiloda is a rapidly developing area, with a mix of residential, commercial.

== History ==
Nana Chiloda was originally part of the Gandhinagar district of Gujarat, India. However, in 2020–2021, the Ahmedabad Municipal Corporation (AMC) acquired the area. This was done as part of the AMC's plan to expand the city's boundaries and accommodate its growing population.
