= Thol Lake =

Lake in India

Thol Lake Thol Bird Sanctuary
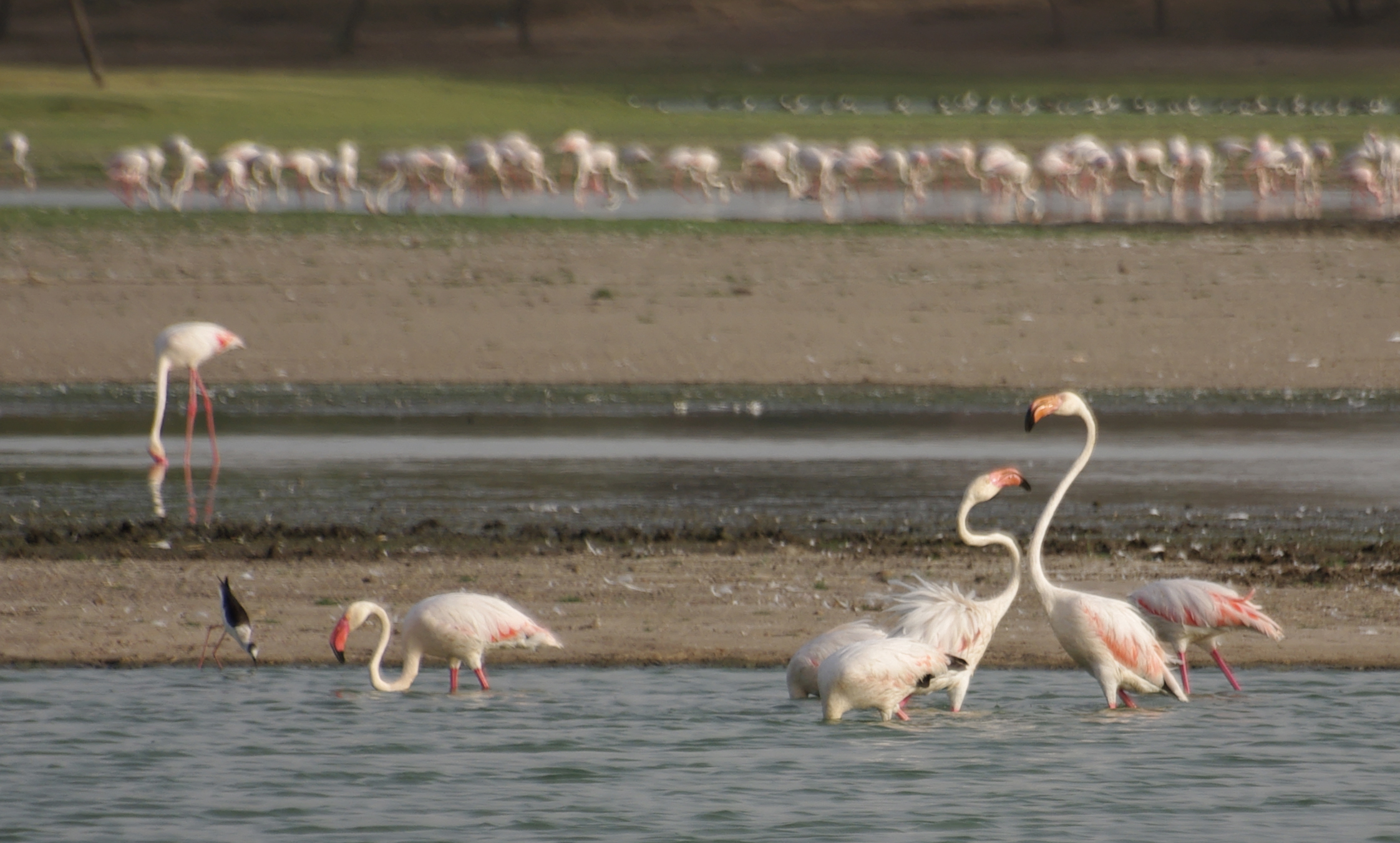
- Flamingos and a black winged stilt in Thol Lake

- Location within Gujarat
- Location: Thol village near Kalol,Kadi,Mehsana District, Gujarat
- Coordinates: 23°22.50′N 72°37.50′E
- Lake type: Lentic
- Catchment area: 15,500 hectares (38,000 acres)
- Basin countries: India
- Surface area: 699 hectares (1,730 acres)
- Water volume: 84 million cubic metres (3.0×10^{9} cu ft)

Thol Lake is an artificial lake near Thol village in Kadi in Mehsana District in the Indian state of Gujarat. A freshwater lake surrounded by marshes, it was built as an irrigation tank in 1912. Declared the Thol Bird Sanctuary in 1988, it is a habitat to 150 species of birds, about 60% of them waterbirds. Many migratory birds nest and breed in the lake and its periphery. The two most prominent species of birds recorded in the sanctuary are flamingoes and sarus crane (Grus antigone). The sanctuary is also proposed to be declared an Eco-Sensitive Zone, conforming to the Environment (Protection) Act, 1986 (29 of 1986), for which draft notification has been prepared.

== Topography ==
The lake drains a catchment area of 15,500 hectares (38,000 acres). It is in a semi-arid zone of the Mehsana district with dominance of dry deciduous vegetation.

The climate in the area consists of three seasons: winter, summer and monsoon. The average annual rainfall in the catchment of the lake is 600 millimetres (24 in) with a minimum of 100 millimetres (3.9 in) and maximum of 800 millimetres (31 in). The maximum and minimum temperatures recorded in the area are 43 °C (109 °F) and 8 °C (46 °F).

The lake is situated near Thol village 20 kilometres (12 mi) from Kalol, 40 kilometres (25 mi) northwest of Ahmedabad, and 75 kilometres (47 mi) from Mehsana.

== History ==
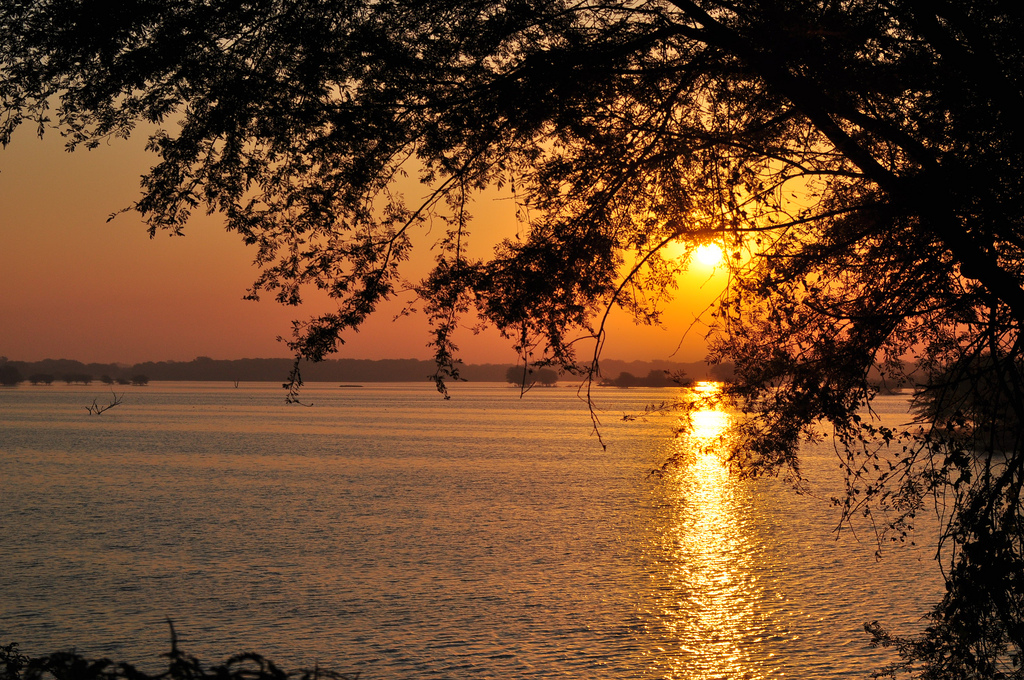
Thol Lake

The lake was initially built in 1912 as a tank by the Gaekwad regime to provide irrigation facilities to farmers. This established the user rights of the lake water. The operation and management of the lake is under the dual control of the Forest and Irrigation departments of the Government of Gujarat.

== Features ==
The lake has a storage capacity of 84 million cubic metres (3.0×10^{9} cu ft). Its water spread area is 699 hectares (1,730 acres). The lake's shore length is 5.62 kilometres (3.49 mi) and water depth is shallow.

== Thol Wildlife Sanctuary ==
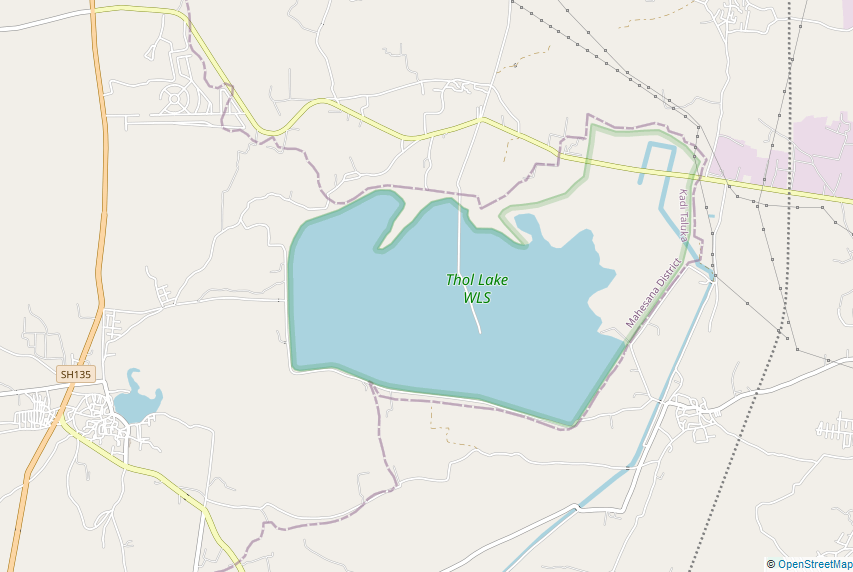
Map of both Thol lakes.

Thol Wildlife Sanctuary, a shallow water reservoir, situated 25 km (15 mi) northwest of Ahmedabad and most popular birding place near Ahmedabad after Nal Sarovar Bird Sanctuary which is about 50 km (30 mi) from Thol Wildlife Sanctuary. Geographically Thol Wildlife Sanctuary falls in Mehsana district of North Gujarat. Kadi, a taluka headquarters of the district, is just 22 km (14 mi) away from the Sanctuary. Thol Wildlife Sanctuary is a man-made (made by Sayajirao Gayakvad, Ruler of Baroda) irrigation tank built in 1912 with water storage capacity of 84,000,000 m^{3} (68,000 ac·ft) and command area of 1450 ha (5.6 mi^{2}) and catchment area of 153 km^{2} (59 mi^{2}). The wetland is predominated by the open water habitat, which is surrounded by cropland, fallow land and scrub land. Due to its popularity amongst the bird fraternity the area was notified as Sanctuary in November 1988 under Sec. 18 of Wildlife (Protection) Act, 1972. The best time to visit the place is November to February.

== Flora ==
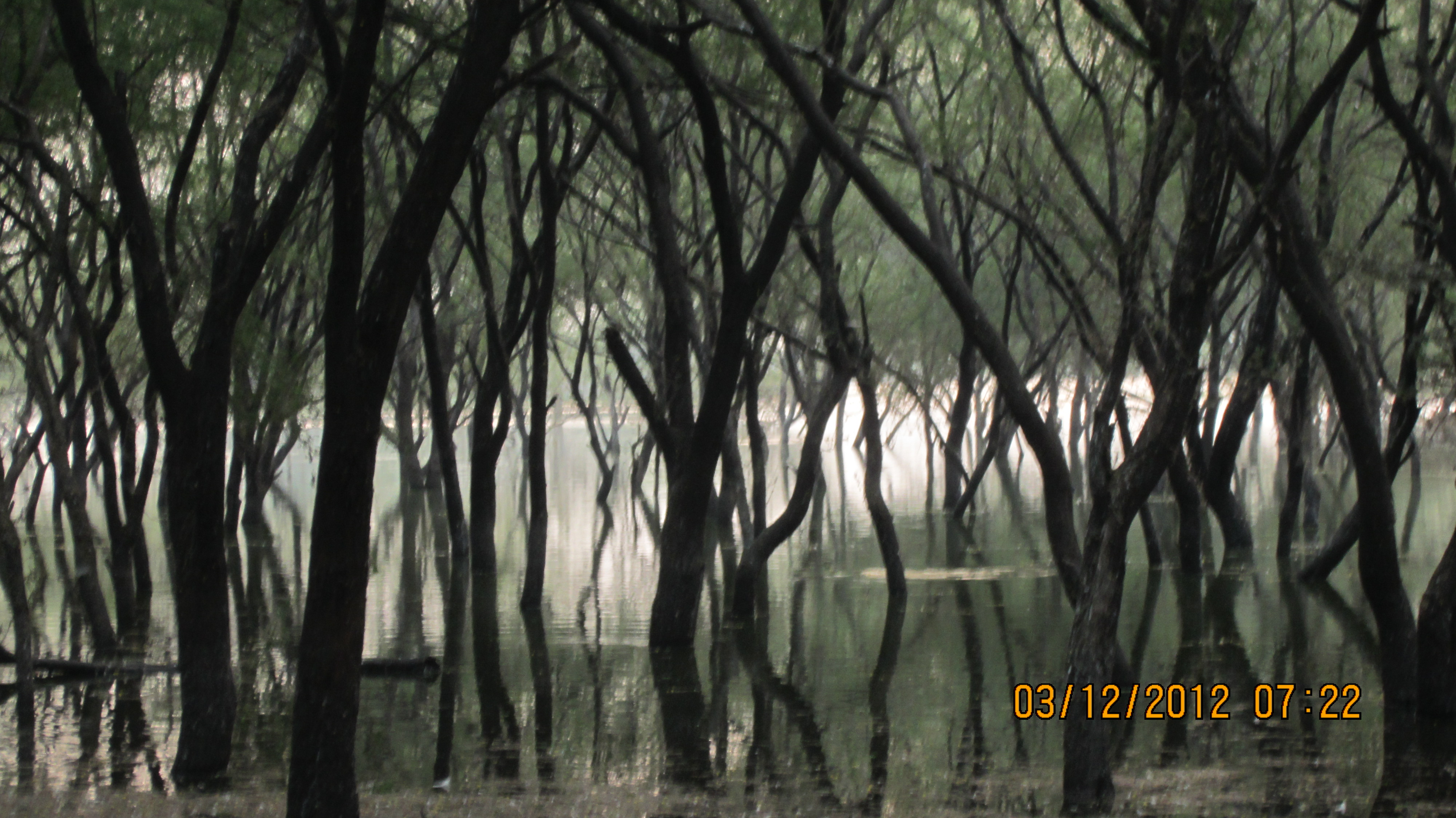
Trees on the periphery of the lake

Apart from trees in the peripheral area of the lake, vegetation reported in this wetland consists of emergent and floating aquatic plants of Acacia nilotica, A. leucoploea, Zizyphus, Azadirachta indica, Ficus sp., Salvadora sp., Prosopis chilensis, and Capparis sp. According to the Normal Biological Spectrum (NBS) study of the sanctuary, drought resistant vegetation in the category of Bio-geographiczone – IV consisting of thorny shrubs and trees are found, and also reported are mixed flora of aquatic and marshy plants.

== Fauna ==
=== Birds ===
Thol Lake, as a bird sanctuary, an inland wetland and a protected area, is known as a very good habitat for waterfowl during the monsoon season, extending through the winter. According to IBA reports there are 150 species of birds in the sanctuary of which nearly 60% (90 species) are stated to be waterbirds which are mostly wintering birds. The most prominent of these species is the flamingos. At one time 5-6 thousand flamingos were reported here. Sarus cranes (Grus antigone), the tallest of the flying birds, nest here in large numbers.

The rich bird life of Thol Wildlife Sanctuary encompasses native as well as migratory birds. Many winter visitors like great white pelicans, flamingos, a variety of waterfowl including mallards and large numbers of geese, sarus cranes and many other waders are common site at sanctuary.

According to the IUCN categorization, the birds reported in the area are: greater flamingo (Phoenicopterus roseus) of least concern species; Dalmatian pelican (Pelecanus crispus), greater spotted eagle (Clanga clanga), sarus crane (Antigone antigone), and Indian skimmer (Rynchops albicollis) of the vulnerable species; and the white-rumped vulture (Gyps bengalensis) and Indian vulture (Gyps indicus) of the critically endangered species.

=== Mammals ===
Some of the important fauna reported in the area surrounding the lake are: bluebull (Boselaphus tragocamelus), golden jackal (Canis aureus) and blackbuck (Antilope cervicapra).

== Bibliography ==
- Rahmani, Asad Rafi; Islam, M. Zafar-Ul (10 December 2004). Important bird areas in India: priority sites for conservation. IBCN, Bombay Natural History Society. ISBN 978-0-19-567333-3.
