= Vadhiyar =

Region of Gujarat, India

Vadhiyar, also spelled Vadhiar, is a region of sami, shankheshwar, Harij and Radhanpur Taluka of Patan district of Gujarat, India.

== History ==
Vadhiyar was originally known as Vriddhikar, the land of grass or herdsmen. The word is also said to be a corruption of Vandh Ahir, the Ahir's camping ground. It was famous for its grass, fowls, sheep, and horses. It is of historic interest as the first seat of the Chavda dynasty, who, in 746, founded the city of Anhilwad Patan. The site of their first capital is preserved in the village of Panchasar.
