= Panchasara Parshvanath Temple =

Śvetāmbara Jain temple in Patan, Gujarat, India

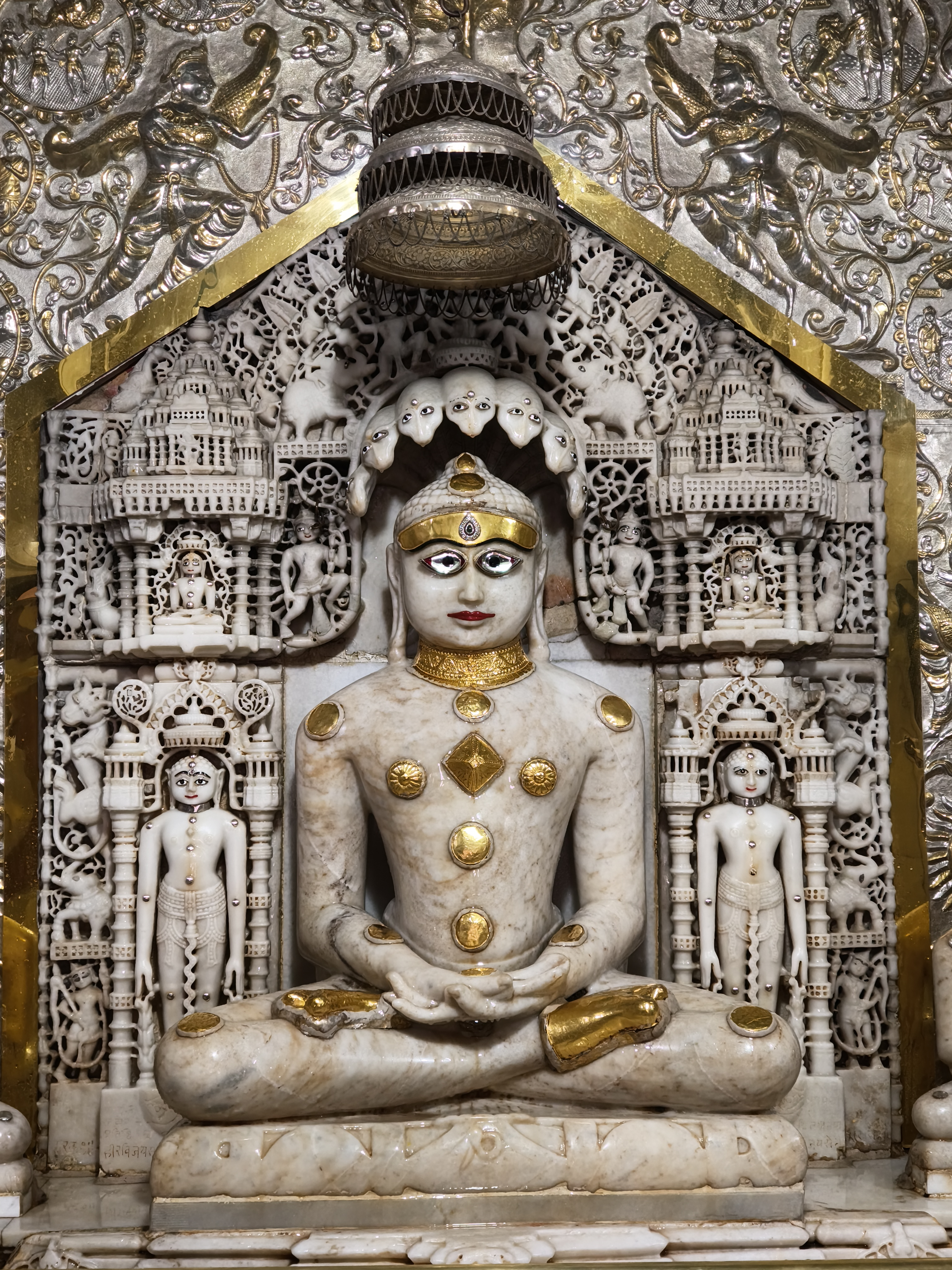
- Image of Pañcāsara Pārśvanātha at Patan

Religion
- Affiliation: Jainism
- Sect: Śvetāmbara
- Deity: Parshvanath
- Festival: Mahavir Janma Kalyanak
- Governing body: Shri Panchasara Parshvanath Jain Derasar Trust

Location
- Location: Patan, Gujarat
- Interactive map of Panchasara Parshvanath Temple
- Coordinates: 23°51′14.3″N 72°07′01.5″E

Architecture
- Creator: Vanaraja Chavda
- Established: 8th century

Panchasara Parshwanath Temple is a Śvetāmbara Jain temple located in Patan, Gujarat. The temple was constructed in 8th century during the reign of Vanaraja Chavda of Chavda dynasty.

== History ==
Vanaraja Chavda (c. 746 CE to c. 780 CE), the most prominent ruler of the Chavda dynasty established the territory of Patan in 746 CE and built the Panchasara Parshwanath temple with main idol of Parshvanatha brought from Panchasar village.

During the rule of Chaulukya dynasty (or Solanki dynasty), Patan was a major pilgrimage centre of Jainism. There are more than 100 temples in the region. The temple was rebuilt in the 16th-17th century after destruction by Muslim invaders.

== Temple ==
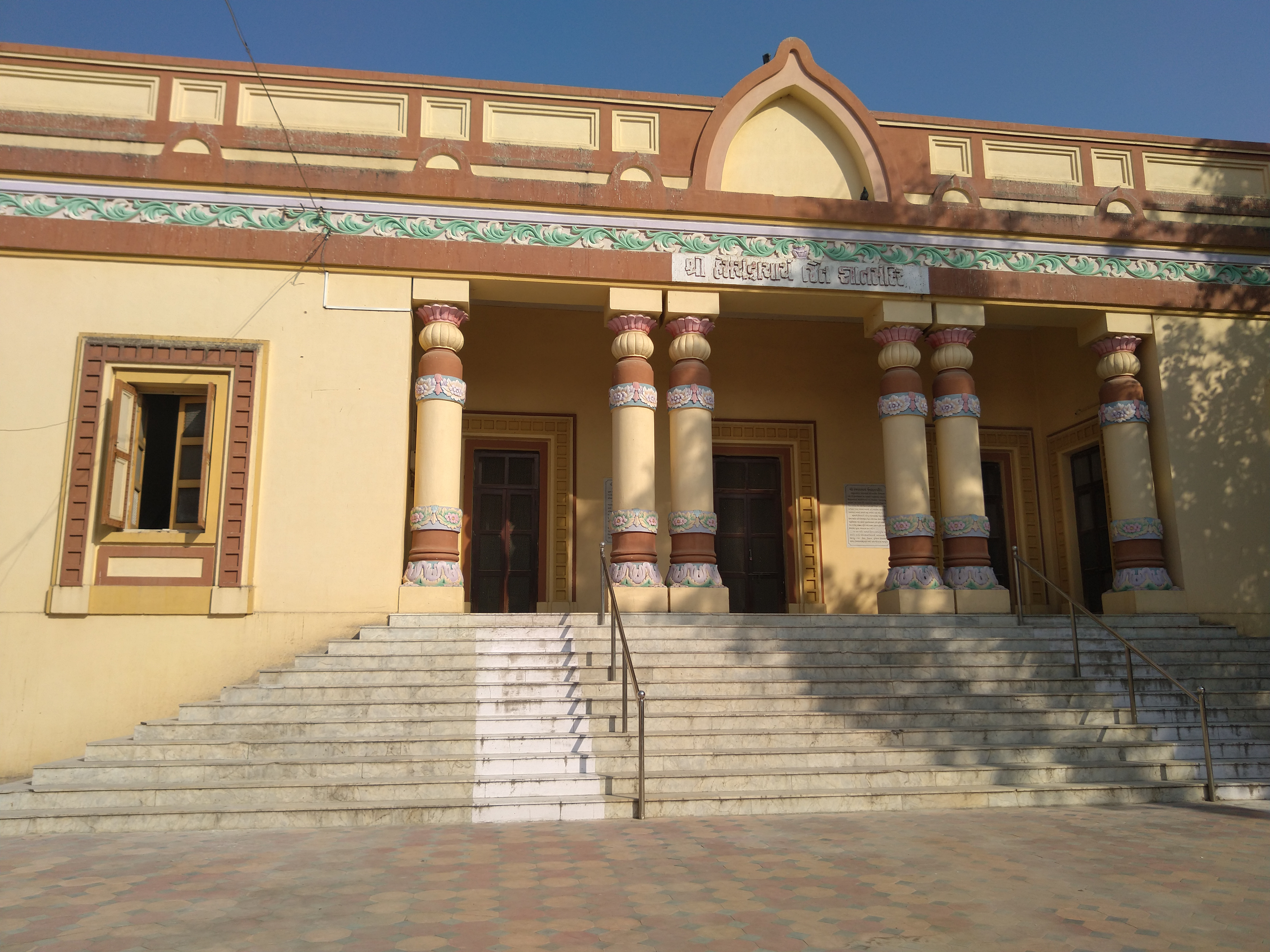
Hemchandracharya Jain Library Patan

This temple is one of the largest temples in Patan. The temple belongs to the Śvetāmbara sect of Jainism. The temple is built with white marble with rich stonework with sacred carvings. The central idol is a 1.5 metres (4.9 ft) tall marble idol of Parshvanatha is completely covered in parikara with image of Padmavati holding 2 lotuses in upper hand, noose in right and goad in left hand. The domical ceiling is decorated by concentric circles of figures and bands of ornament with a lotus-shaped pendant extending from the dome of the center roof. The ceiling features eight bracket figures of musicians or dancers; between these figures are seated tirthankaras with yaksha and yakshi on either side.

In Śvetāmbara tradition, idols tends to derive their name from a geographical region, the Pañcásar Parshvanath is one of 108 prominent idols of Parshvanath idols. The temple also houses an idol of Vasupujya in padmasan position sitting on big lotus with long stalk. The idol has images of yakshi and yaksha on both sides and the sculpture is covered with foliage of Chaitya tree to commemorate the penance of Vasupujya. The temple also houses idols of Jain monk Kakkasuri, Devachandrasuri and Yashodevsuri.

Hemachandrayacharya Jain Gyan Mandir is an ancient library built by Hemachandra. This library is one of the most important Jain libraries in Gujarat and the collection includes several ancient palm-leaf manuscripts. The temple also houses a paper manuscript of Parshvanathacaritra as well as the oldest available manuscript of the Bhaktāmara Stotra.

== See also ==
- Shankheshwar Jain Temple
- Roda Group of Temples
