= Gambhu =

Gambhu Gambhuya
- Village
- Location in Gujarat, India Gambhu (India)
- Coordinates: 23.61685493°N 72.19188634°E
- Country: India
- State: Gujarat
- District: Mehsana

Government
  - Type: Gram Panchayat
  - Body: Gambhu Dedarada

Area
  - Total: 16.4942 km^{2} (6.3684 sq mi)

Population (2011)
  - Total: 4,015
  - Density: 243.4/km^{2} (630.5/sq mi)

Languages
  - Official: Gujarati, Hindi
- Time zone: UTC+5:30 (IST)
- PIN: 384212
- Vehicle registration: GJ-2
- Nearest city: Mehsana

Gambhu is a village in Bahucharaji Taluka of Mehsana district in Gujarat, India.

== Population ==
As of the 2011 Census, the population of Gambhu was 4,015 people in 924 households. This was made up of 2,072 males and 1,943 females.

== History ==
The ruins of Karnasagar lake built by Chaulukya ruler Karna are located near the village. The village was known as Gambhuyata in history. Jain monk Shilgunsuri had lived here and it is believed that Chavda king Vanaraja lived here during his incognito years.

According to the Nemināha-cariu by Haribhadrasuri, after the coronation of Vanaraja, he asked an elderly Jain merchant-prince of the Pragavata lineage from Gambhuya (Gambhu) village (although originally from Shrimal/Bhinmal) named Ṭhakkura Ninnaya to live in Anahilapataka (Patan) as a minister in Vanaraja's court, and Ninnaya's son Lahara became a general (daṇḍapati).

== Places of interest ==
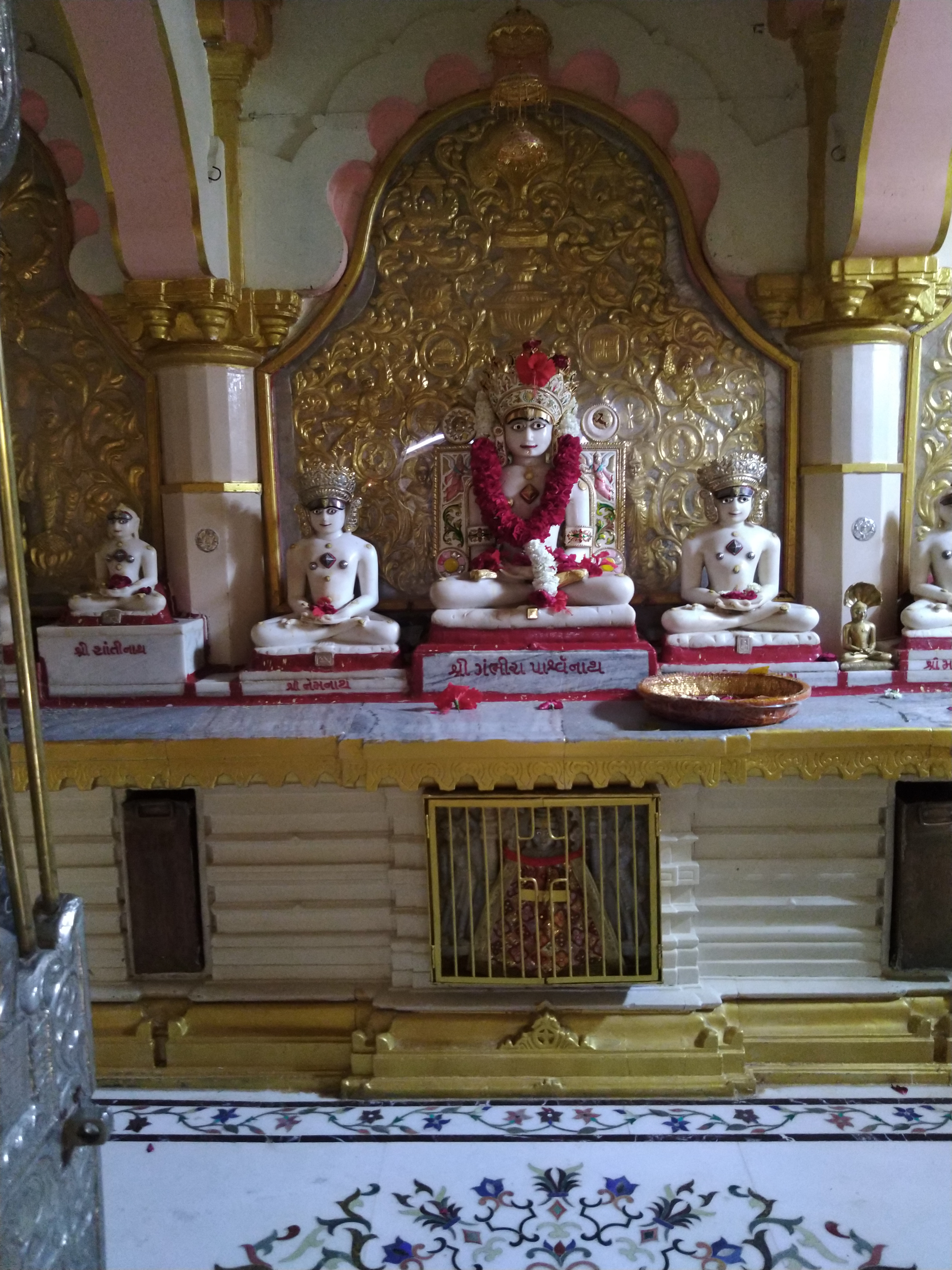
Deities in Gambhira Parshwanath Jain Temple

The village is a pilgrim centre of Jainism. There is a Jain temple of Gambhira Parshwanath in the village. In 2022, eleven Jain statues from 11th–12th century were found during the excavation.

== Amenities ==
The village has three primary and a secondary schools. It has a primary health centre and a post office.

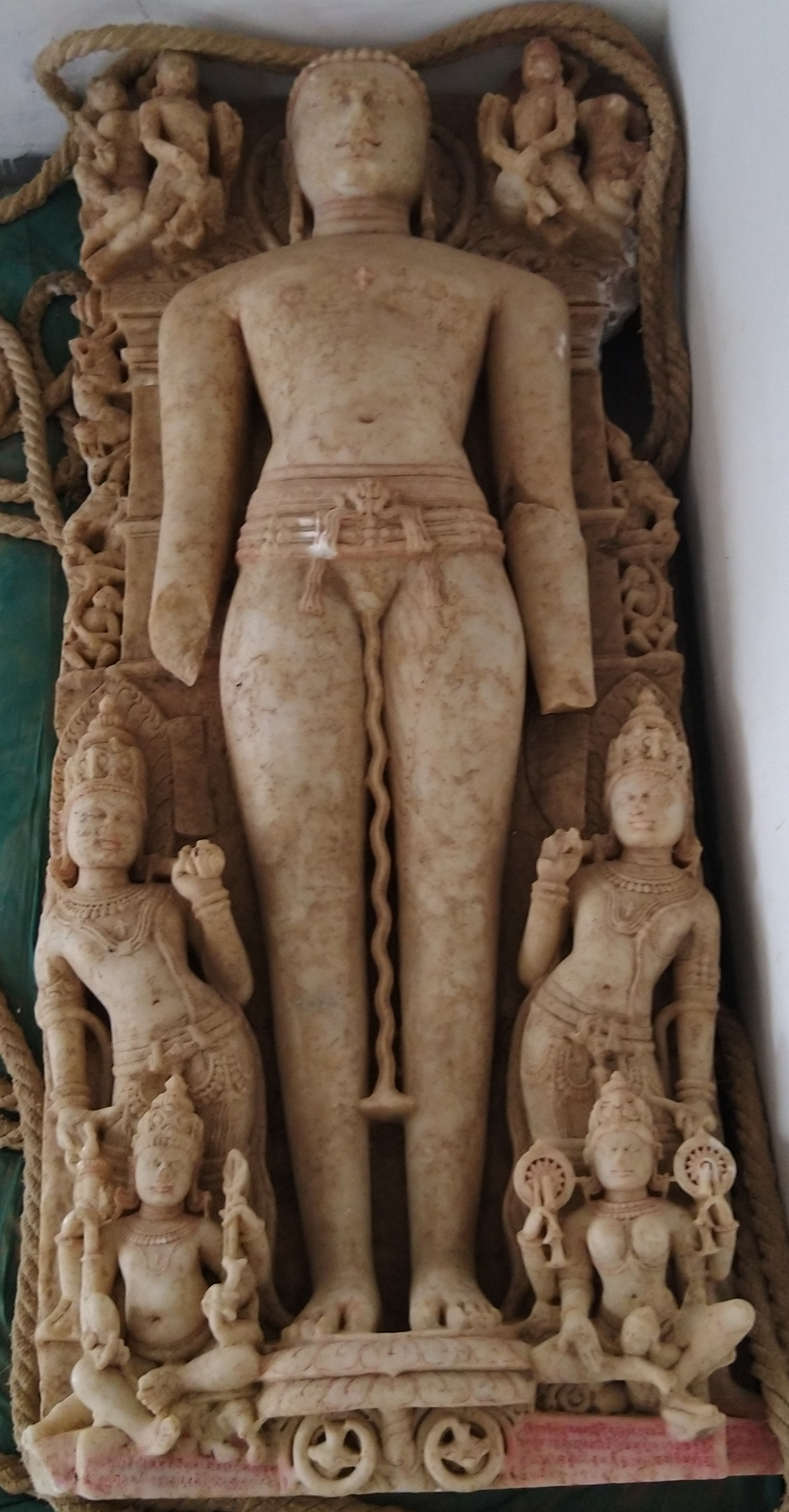
11th century Jain statue found during the excavation
