= Panchasar =

Coordinates: 23.424826°N 71.813626°E

Panchasar is a village in Shankheshwar Taluka of Patan district of Gujarat, India.

== History ==
Panchasar is one of the oldest seats of power in north-west Gujarat. During the seventh century it was the capital of Jai Shikhri of the Chavda dynasty or Chapotkat clan, and was so splendid a city that, according to the court bard, no one living there had any desire for Paradise. This boasting of his bard brought against Jai Shikhri (697) the power of the king of Kalyan Katak. The first expedition, surprised by Jai Shikhri's minister, was defeated, but a second, under the personal command of the Kalyan king, ended in the destruction of Jai Shikhri and of his capital. His wife, saved by her husband's forethought, became the mother of Vanraj Chavda, the founder (746) of the city of Anhilwad Patan.

It was under Palanpur Agency of Bombay Presidency, which in 1925 became the Banas Kantha Agency. After Independence of India in 1947, Bombay Presidency was reorganized in Bombay State. When Gujarat state was formed in 1960 from Bombay State, it fell under Mehsana district of Gujarat. It became part of Patan district subsequently.

At Rantoj and Shankheshwar near Panchasar, are Jain temples more than once re-built, and probably holding the same sites since very early times.

== See also ==
- Panchasara Jain temple
