= Vanaraja Chavda =

King of Chavda dynasty

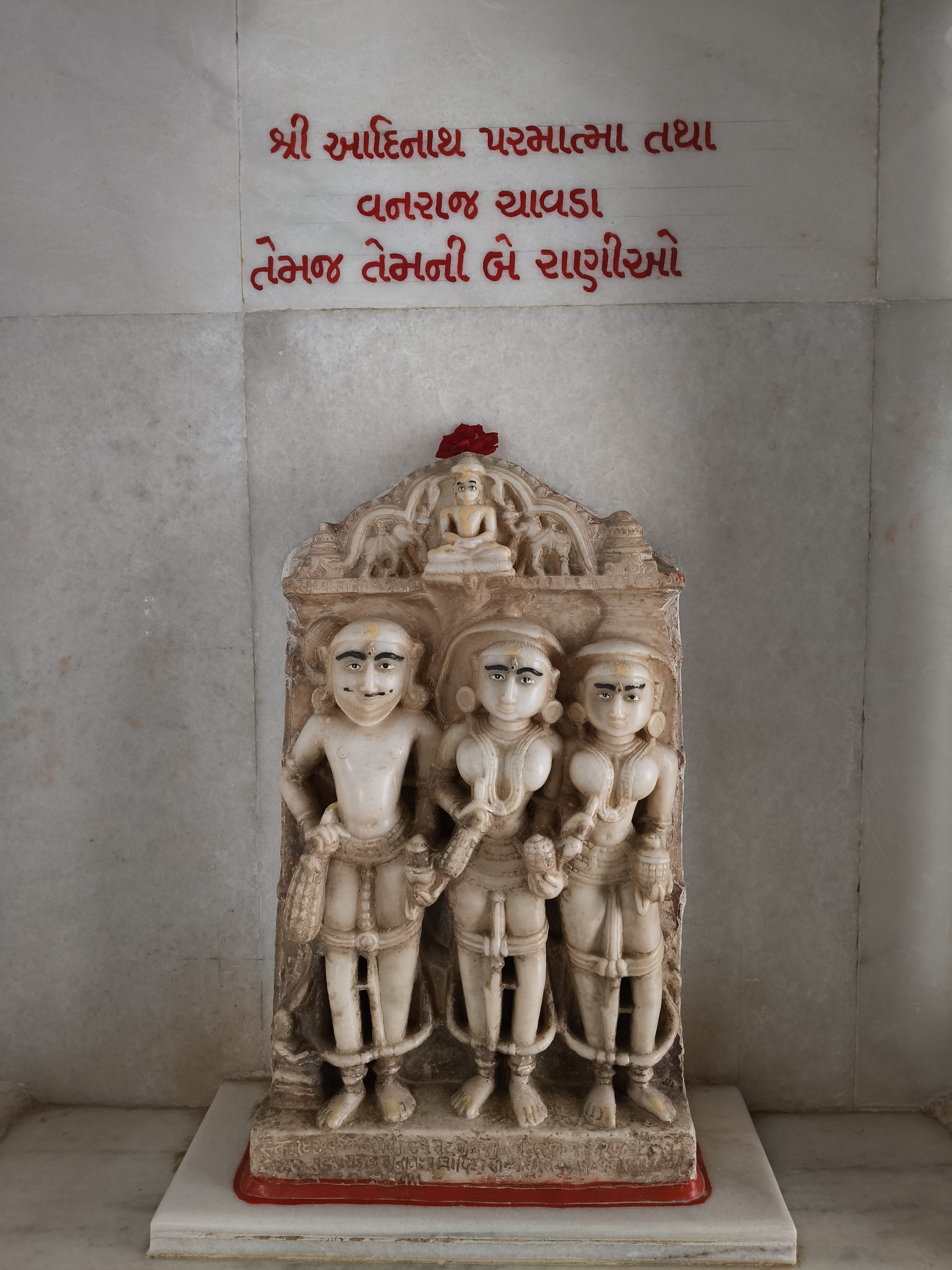
- A 14th century idol of Vanarāja Cāvaḍā with his queens at Pañcāsara Pārśavātha (new) Temple, Patan (Gujarat)

King of Anahilawada
- Reign: c. 746 – c. 780 CE
- Successor: Yogaraja
- Dynasty: Chavda dynasty
- Father: Jayaśekhara
- Mother: Rupasundari

Vanaraja (IAST: Vanarāja Cāvaḍā) was the most prominent king of the Chavda dynasty who ruled Gujarat from c. 746 CE to c. 780 CE.

== Life ==
=== Early life ===
Kṛishṇabhaṭṭa’s (also known as Kṛṣṇakavi) Ratnamālā (c. 1230 CE) says that in 695/696 CE (Samvat 752) Jayaśekhara, the Cāvaḍā king of Pañcāsara, a village (in modern-day Patan district, Gujarat), was attacked by the Chaulukya king Bhūvaḍa of Kalyāna-kaṭaka in Kanyākubja (probably Kanauj) and slain by Bhūvaḍa in battle. Before his death Jayaśekhara, he sent his pregnant wife Rūpasundarī to the forest in charge of her brother Surapāla, one of his chief warriors who now turned to banditry. After Jayaśekhara’s death on the battlefield, Rūpasundarī gave birth to a son named Vanarāja. This tradition is of dubious validity, as there is no city called Kalyāna-kaṭaka near Kanauj, and the Cālukya capital of Kalyāṇa in the Deccan was only founded in the 11th century, about 250 years after the events are stated to have taken place. Additionally, there is no known king named Bhūvaḍa, although some scholars guess that it may refer to the Cālukya king Vijayāditya, who was also known as Bhuvanāśraya.

Merutuṇga, the author of the Prabandhachintāmaṇi, tells a story that Rupasundarī was living in Pañcāsara and had placed her infant son in a hammock on a tree, when a Śvetāmbara Jain monk named Śīlaguṇasūri who was passing by noticed that the tree's shade was not bending, which he believed was a sign of the boy's role to be a propagator of Jainism. The story adds that a nun named Vīramatī brought up the boy whom the monks called Vanarája, literally "the forest king". When eight years old, the monk told Vanarāja to protect his place of worship from rats. The boy’s skill in shooting rats and his horoscope convinced the monk he was not fit to be a monk but was worthy of a kingdom. He therefore returned the boy to his mother. These details seem invented by the Jain writers themselves. No mention of any such story occurs in the Ratnamálá. (Note: In the Satyapurakalpa of his Tírthákalpa, Jinaprabhasúri tells an almost identical story of another king.)

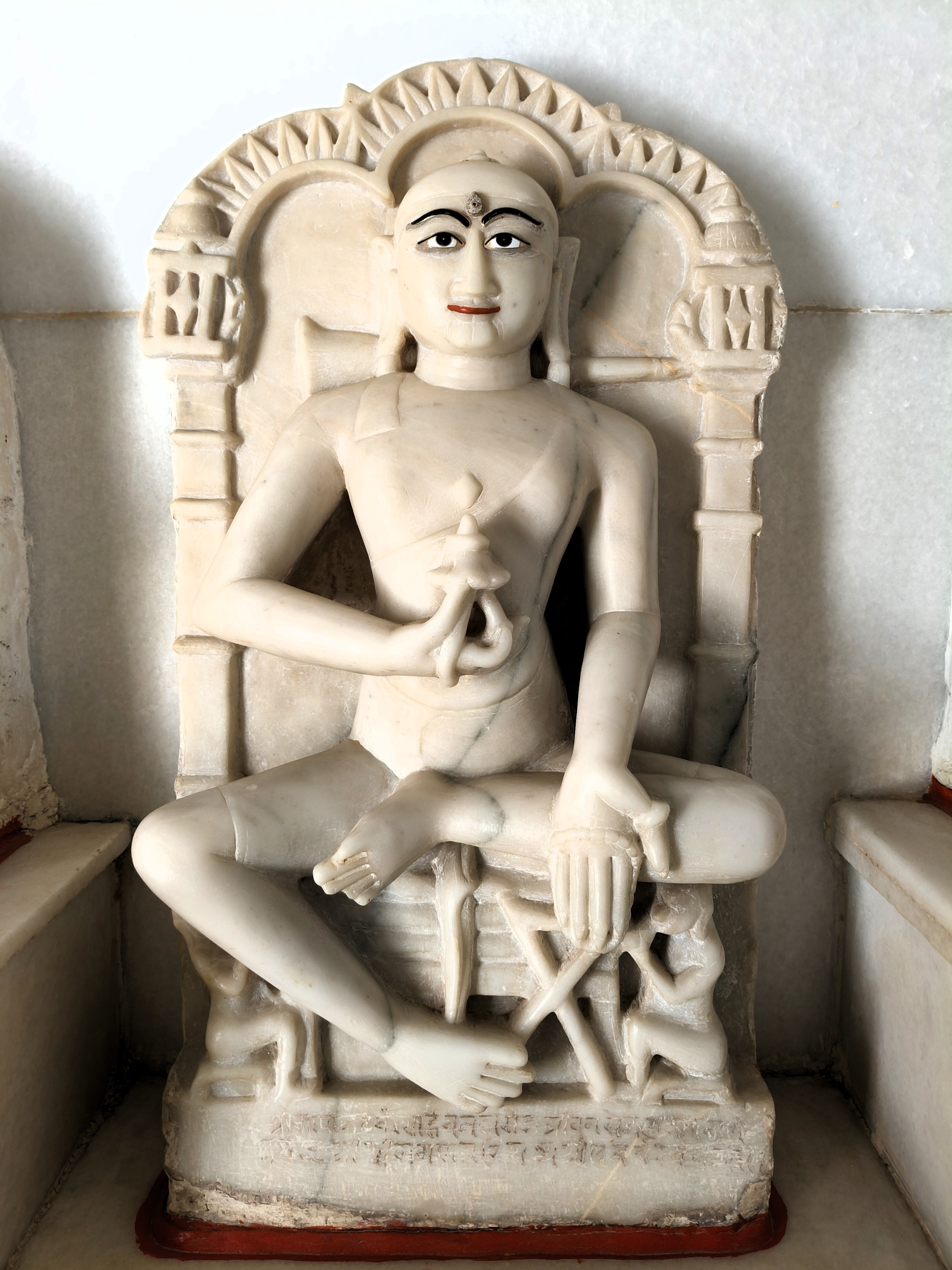
Śīlaguṇasūri's idol at Pañcāsara Pārśvanātha Jaina (new) Temple, Patan.

In the Purātana-prabandha-saṅgraha, in Ambāsana village, two Cāpotkaṭa brothers, Canda and Cāmuṇḍa, are foretold by an astrologer that Cāmuṇḍa's unborn son would kill Canda. Cāmuṇḍa's unnamed wife is cast out and she moves to Pañcāsara, where she gives birth to Vanarāja and places him in a hammock on a tree, when Śīlaguṇasūri who was passing by noticed that the tree's shade was not bending, and then proceeds to take them both to live in a temple.

According to the Dharmāraṇya-māḥātmya, Gujarat was conquered by Āma, king of Kanauj, who then gave it away as dowry to his son-in-law Dhruvapaṭa of Valabhi. Due to this, the Brāhmanas fled to Jayaśekhara of Pañcāsara. Dhruvapaṭa thus invited Āma to attack Jayaśekhara, who then dies on the battlefield. His wife, Akṣaṭa, is given refuge in a forest by Brāhmanas, who then foresees a royal future for her son.

In the forests where Vanarája passed his youth lived his maternal uncle Surapála, one of Jayaśekhara’s generals, who, after his sovereign’s defeat and death, had become an outlaw. Vanarája grew up under Surapála’s charge. The Prabandhachintámaṇi records the following story of the origin of Vanarája’s wealth. A Kanyákubja king married Maháṇaká, the daughter of a Gujarát king. To receive the proceeds of the marriage cess which the Gujarát king had levied from his subjects, a deputation or panchkúla came from Kanyákubja to Gujarát. The deputation made Vanarája their leader or sellabhrit to realize the proceeds of the cess. In six months Vanarája collected 24 lákhs of Páruttha drammas (Note: This name often recurs in Jain works. These would seem to be Kshatrapa coins as Gadhaiya coins are simply called drammas.) and 4000 horse, which the deputation took and started for Kanyákubja. Vanarája waylaid and killed them, secured the money and horses, and remained in hiding for a year. With the wealth thus acquired Vanarája enrolled an army and established his power assuming the title of king.

=== Accession to Aṇahilaváḍa ===
Aṇahilaváḍa (or Aṇahilapura, now Patan, Gujarat) was founded in 746 or 765 CE. The story of the choice of the site is the usual story of a hunted hare turning on the hounds showing the place to be the special nurse of strength and courage. Vanarája is said to have asked a Bharváḍ or Shepherd named Aṇahila son of Śákhadá to show him the best site. Aṇahila agreed on condition that the city should be called by his name. Aṇahila accordingly showed Vanarája the place where a hare had attacked and chased a dog. The city may have been called after some local chief since it was popularly known as Aṇahilaváḍa (Sanskrit:Aṇahilaváta) that is "the place of Aṇahila".

In the Prabandhachintámaṇi, Merutuṇga gives 746 CE (S. 802) as the date of the accession of Vanarája, while in his Vicháraśreṇi the same author gives 765 CE (S. 821 Vaisakha Śukla 2) as the date of the foundation of the city. The discrepancy may be explained by taking 746 CE (S. 802) to refer to the date of Vanarája’s getting money enough to fix the site of his capital, and 765 CE (S. 821) to refer to the date of his accession in the completed Aṇahilaváḍa. According to local tradition, an image of Ganpati in the city also have an inscription dated S. 802 but it seems late installation.

Vicháraśreṇi gives 765 (S. 821) seems the more probable date for the accession to the throne as the Prabandhachintámaṇi says that Vanarája accessed to throne at Aṇahilapura when he was about fifty. (Note: The text is “Pañcháśatavarshadesyaḥ.”) This accords with the date fixed on other grounds. Placing Vanarája’s birth at about 720 CE would make him 44 in 765 CE (S. 821) corresponding to date mentioned in the Vicháraśreṇi. Merutuṇga in both his works gives the length of Vanarája’s life at 109 and of his reign at sixty years. The figure 60 seems to mark the length of his life and not of his reign. So long a reign as sixty years is barely possible for a sovereign who succeeded late in life, and the 109 years of his life can hardly be correct. Taking Vanarája’s age at 45 when he was installed in 765 CE (S. 821) and allowing fifteen years more to complete the sixty years, he probably died circa 780 (S. 836), the closing year of his reign. Vanraja was succeeded by his son, Yogaraja.

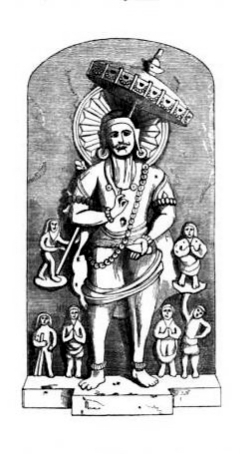
Vanaraja Chavada, a woodcut by Alexander Kinloch Forbes in Râs Mâlâ (1856) based on a statue at Sidhpur.

The Prabandhacintāmaṇi narrates how Vanarāja lived the first half of his life as a vagabound who robbed and plundered throughout the region, but yet was able to gain the support of rich and powerful merchants for his future reign. His Tilaka ceremony was performed by a woman named Śrīdevī of Kākara village (probably Kankrej) whom in fulfillment of an early promise Vanarāja had taken to be his sister. The story regarding the promise is that once when Vanarāja had gone with his uncle on a thieving expedition to Kākara village and had broken into the house of a merchant he by mistake dipped his hand into a pot of curds. As to touch curds is the same as to dine at a house as a guest, Vanarāja left the house without taking anything from it. Hearing what had happened the merchant’s sister invited Vanarāja as a brother to dinner and gave him clothes. In return Vanarāja promised that she would place the tilaka on his head at his coronation. Vanarája chose as chief minister a merchant named Jāmba (also known as Jamba). The story is that three of Vanarāja's bandit followers came across a merchant Jāmba who had five arrows. Seeing only three enemies, Jāmba broke and threw away two of the arrows, shouting ‘One for each of you.’ The bandits being impressed with Jāmba's warrior skill took him to Vanarāja, who promised to make him his chief minister at his coronation. From the absence of any reference to him in these and similar tales it is probable that his uncle Surapála died before the installing of Vanarája. According to the Nemināha-cariu by Haribhadrasūri, after the coronation of Vanarāja, he asked an elderly Jain merchant-prince of the Prāgvāṭa lineage from Gambhūya village (although originally from Śrīmālā) named Ṭhakkura Ninnaya to live in Aṇahilapāṭaka as a minister in Vanarāja's court, and Ninnaya's son Lahara became a general (daṇḍapati). Lahara captured elephants from the Vindhyas for Vanarāja and was thus granted the village of Sandāthala, where Lahara erected a statue of the goddess Vindhyavāsinī.

The Kuvalayamālā mentions a legend about Vanaraja that he was assisted by a Jain monk in acquiring his kingdom.

He also credited with the foundation of Champaner, in honour one of his generals, Champa.

== Religion ==
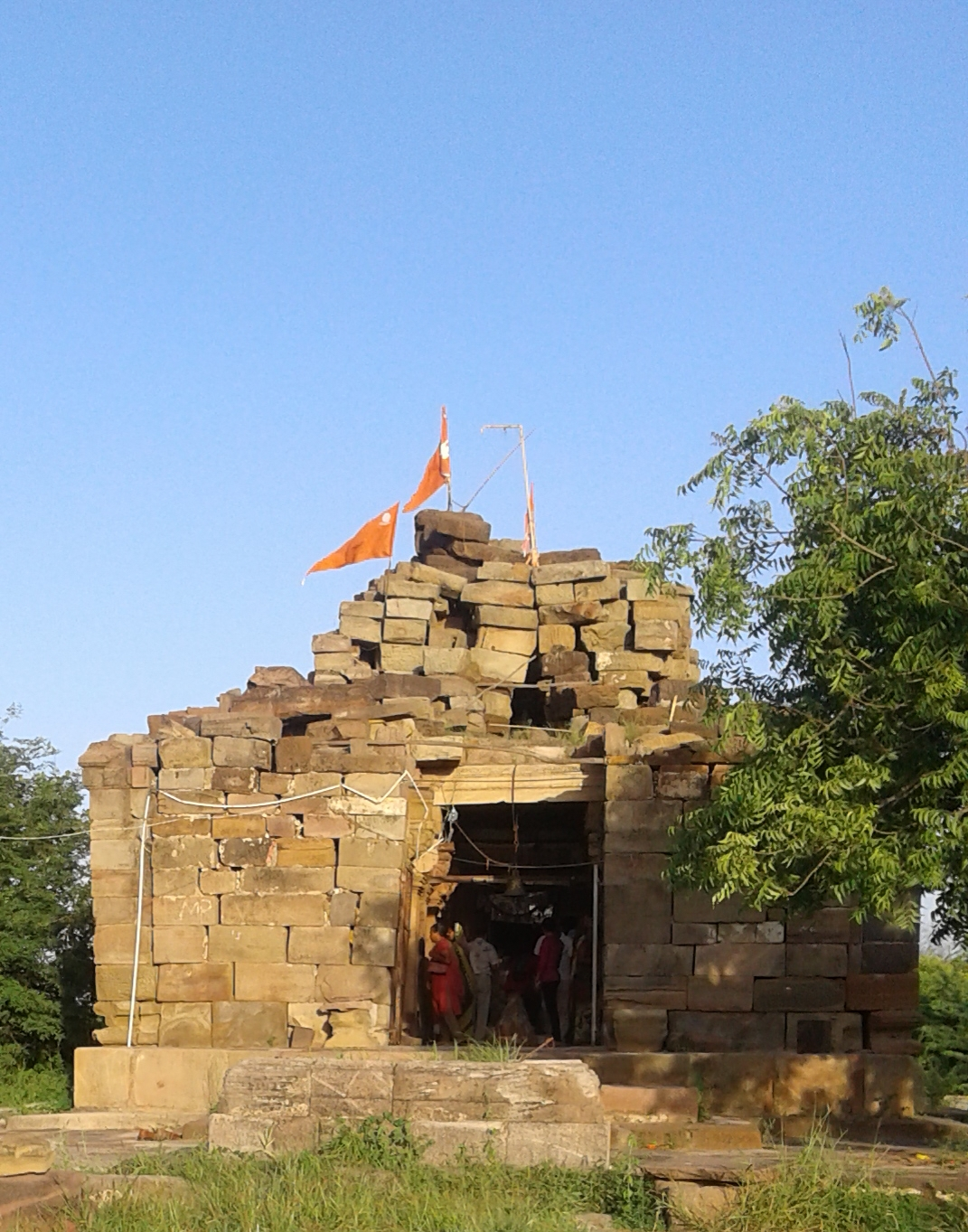
Ruins of Shiva temple at Puaranogadh at Manjal in Kutch

Vanaraja Chavda is not portrayed as a Jain by birth, yet he is shown participating in distinctly Jain rituals of kingship by Jain authors.

=== Temples ===
Merutuṅga's Prabandhacintāmaṇi states that at the suggestion of Śīlaguṇasūri, Vanarāja built the Panchasara Parshvanath Temple, which contained an idol of Tirthankara Pārśvanātha with a statue of Vanarāja as a worshipper. The figure of Vanarája is still shown at Sidhpur and a woodcut of it is given by Alexander Kinloch Forbes in his Rás Málá (1856). He also erected a temple to Kaṇṭeśvarī near his palace. Neither of these temples survived till modern-day.

Haribhadrasūri's Nemināha-cariu states that the minister Ninnaya built a temple of Ṛṣabha at Aṇahillapāṭaka, and his son, the general Lahara built a temple to Vindhyavāsinī at Sandāthala.

== In popular culture ==
Vanraj Chavdo (1881), a Gujarati novel written by Mahipatram Rupram Nilkanth, is based on the life of Vanraja Chavda. Indian films on the king include: Vanraj Chavdo (1923) by Shree Nath Patankar, Vanraj (1930) by Nanubhai Vakil.

== Notes and references ==
=== Bibliography ===
- Cort, John E., ed. (1998), Open Boundaries: Jain Communities and Cultures in Indian History, SUNY Press, ISBN 0-7914-3785-X
- Cort, John E. (2001), Jains in the World : Religious Values and Ideology in India, Oxford University Press, ISBN 0-19-513234-3
- Cort, John E. (2010), Framing the Jina: Narratives of Icons and Idols in Jain History, Oxford University Press, ISBN 9780195385021
- Choudhary, Gulab Chandra (1963). Political History of Northern India: from Jain Sources (c. 650 A.D. to 1300 A.D.). Sohanlal Jaidharma Pracharak Samiti.
- Merutunga Ācārya (1901). The Prabandhacintāmaṇi or Wishing-Stone of Narratives. Translated by Charles Henry Tawney. The Asiatic Society of Bengal.
