= Chavda dynasty =

Dynasty of ancient India

- c. 690–942
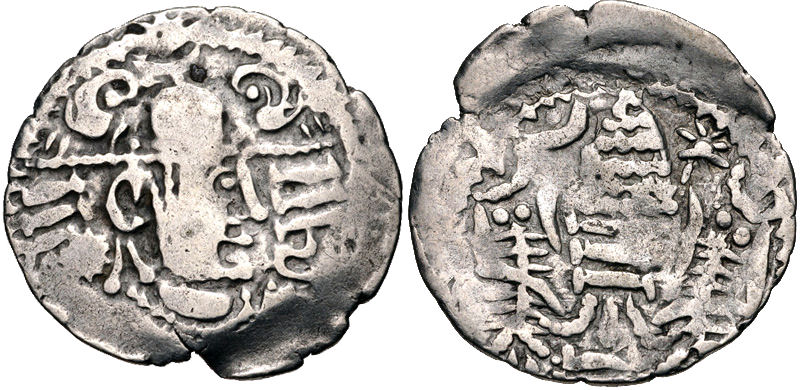
- Coin of the Chavada dynasty, circa 570–712 CE. Crowned Sasanian-style bust right / Fire altar with ribbons and attendants; star and crescent flanking flames.

- Location of the Chavdas and main neighbouring polities in South Asia, circa 800 CE.
- Capital: Panchasar; Aṇahilaváḍa (Modern Patan)
- Common languages: Old Gujarati, Prakrit
- Religion: Hinduism
- Government: Monarchy
- History
  - Established: c. 690
  - Disestablished: 942
Preceded by
Kingdom of Valabhi
Succeeded by
Kingdom of Gujarat
Chudasama dynasty
Cutch State
- Today part of: India

The Chavda (IAST:Chávaḍá), also spelled Chawda or Chavada was a dynasty which ruled the region of modern-day Gujarat in India, from c. 690 to 942. Variants of the name for the dynasty include Chapotkatas, Chahuda and Chávoṭakas.

Vanraja was the founder (746 or 765) of the city of Aṇahilaváḍa and most prominent ruler of the dynasty. According to Prabandhachintámaṇi, he ruled for 60 years. He was succeeded by Yogaraja (ruled 35 years), followed by Kshemraja (25 years), Bhuyada (29 years), Virsimha (25 years) and Ratnaditya (15 years). Ratnaditya was succeeded by Samantsimha (also known as Chuyadadeva) who ruled seven years. Samantsimha did not have any children so he adopted his nephew Mularaja who overthrew him in 942 and established the Chaulukya dynasty.

== Historical Sources and References ==
=== Sources on Chavda Rule ===
The chief sources of information regarding the Chavda rule are the opening chapters of the Prabandhachintámaṇi and Vicháraśreṇi, Sukṛitasankírtana, and Ratnamálá. All of these works are written during rule of Chaulukya dynasty, successors of Chavdas. The Prabandhachintámaṇi and Vicháraśreṇi were written by Merutunga. The Prabandhachintámaṇi is a short historical compilation; the Vicháraśreṇi, though a mere list of kings, is more reliable. Kṛishṇabhaṭṭa's Ratnamálá is a poetic history with good descriptions and many fables taken from the Prabandhachintámaṇi. Arisiṇha's Sukṛitasankírtana is a short work largely borrowed from the Vicháraśreṇi.

=== Epigraphic Reference ===
The reference to them was found in a Navsari copperplate of Chalukya governor of Lata region (modern-day South Gujarat) Avanijanashraya Pulakeshin dated 738-39 CE which enlisted the dynasties defeated by Arabs (Tajika) and finally repelled by him. In it, Chávoṭaka is mentioned after Kachchela and Saindhavas.

=== Dharanivaraha's Haddala Grant ===
Dharanivaraha's Haddala grant dated Shaka 836 (914 CE) mentions himself as Chapas of Vardhamana (now Wadhwan). Dharanivaraha was subordinate of Mahipala of Gurjara-Pratihara (of Kanauj). The grant was issued to Acharya of Amardaka Santana of Vimkala village (Shaiva sect). It also mentions his ancestors; Vikramarka, Addaka, Pulakeshin, Dhruvabhata followed by himself.

== Origin ==
The Chavdas are connected with the Chápas of Bhinmal and Chápas of Wadhwan. Dharanivaraha of Vardhamana's grant mentions origin from the Chapa or bow of Shiva. It was a common practice at that time to associate one's origin with Puranic or mythological traditions. Historically, they originated as unimportant rulers and forest-dwelling thieves.

== History ==
=== Early history ===
A small Chavda chiefship centred at Pañchásar (now a village in Patan district, Gujarat) in the 7th century. The Navsari copperplate prove the early existence of the domain. According to Jackson, they were probably always feudatories of the rulers of Bhinmal.

=== Jayaśekhara ===
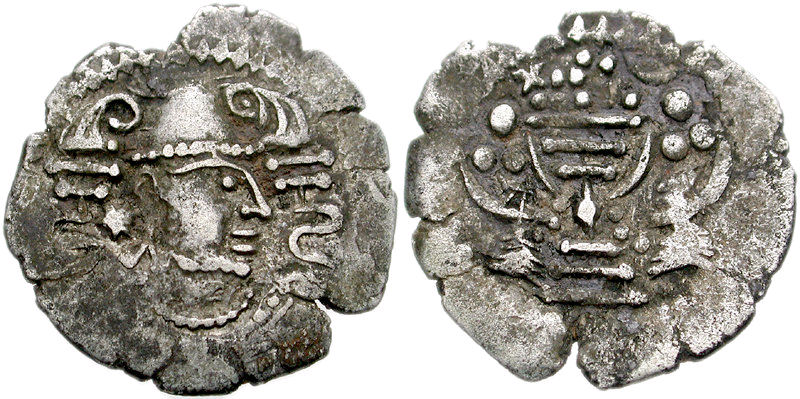
Chavdas of Gujarat, uncertain ruler, circa 760-850 CE. Sasanian-style crowned bust right / Fire altar with ribbons and attendants; star and crescent flanking flames.

The author of the Ratnamálá (c. 1230 CE) says that in 696 CE (Samvat 752) Jayaśekhara, the Chavda king of Pañchásar was attacked by the Chaulukya king Bhuvaḍa of Kalyánakaṭaka in Kanyákubja (probably Kanauj) and slain by Bhuvaḍa in battle. Before his death Jayaśekhara, he sent his pregnant wife Rupasundarí to the forest in charge of her brother Surapála, one of his chief warriors. After Jayaśekhara's death, Rupasundarí gave birth to a son named Vanarája.

The truthfulness of the tradition is doubtful. In the seventh century, not Chaulukyas but Gurjara-Pratihara and Pala kings flourished in Kanauj. No place of importance called Kalyánakaṭaka is recorded in the Kanauj territory. The Western Chalukya kingdom with its capital at Kalyán was only established about the middle of the eleventh century. The Chalukyas of Vemulavada lists contain no king named Bhuvaḍa, unless he be the great Chálukya king Vijayáditya also called Bhuvanásraya, who warred in the north and was there imprisoned but made his escape. The Prabandhachintámaṇi and other old records do not mention of an invasion from Kanauj. The attack may be carried out by Gurjara-Pratihara or Arabs mentioned in Navsari copperplate.

=== Vanraj ===
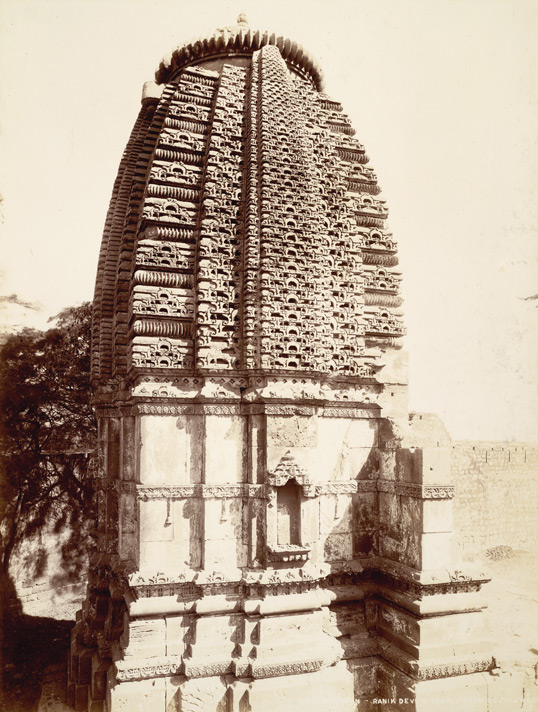
Ranakdevi's Temple from south-west, Wadhwan, 1899

Merutunga, the author of the Prabandhachintámaṇi, tells a story that Rupasundarí was living in the forest swinging her son in a hammock, when a Jain monk named Śílaguṇasúri noticing as he passed royal marks on the boy bought him from his mother. The story adds that a nun named Víramatí brought up the boy whom the monks called Vanarája, literally "the forest king". When eight years old, the monk told Vanarája to protect his place of worship from rats. The boy's skill in shooting rats convinced the monk he was not fit to be a monk but was worthy of a kingdom. He therefore returned the boy to his mother. These details seem invented by the Jain writers themselves. No mention of any such story occurs in the Ratnamálá. (Note: In the Satyapurakalpa of his Tírthákalpa, Jinaprabhasúri tells an almost identical story of another king.)

In the forests where Vanarája passed his youth lived his maternal uncle Surapála, one of Jayaśekhara's generals, who, after his sovereign's defeat and death, had become an outlaw. Vanarája grew up under Surapála's charge. The Prabandhachintámaṇi records the following story of the origin of Vanarája's wealth. A Kanyákubja king married Maháṇaká, the daughter of a Gujarát king. To receive the proceeds of the marriage cess which the Gujarát king had levied from his subjects, a deputation or panchkúla came from Kanyákubja to Gujarát. The deputation made Vanarája their leader or sellabhrit to realize the proceeds of the cess. In six months Vanarája collected 24 lákhs of Páruttha drammas (Note: This name often recurs in Jain works. These would seem to be Kshatrapa coins as Gadhaiya coins are simply called drammas.) and 4000 horses, which the deputation took and started for Kanyákubja. Vanarája waylaid and killed them, secured the money and horses, and remained in hiding for a year. With the wealth thus acquired Vanarája enrolled an army and established his power assuming the title of king.

Founding of Aṇahilaváḍa (now Patan, Gujarat), 746–765 CE, he fixed the site of a capital which afterwards rose to be the great city of Aṇahilapura. Vanarája is said to have asked a Bharváḍ or Shepherd named Aṇahila, son of Śákhadá to show him the best site. Aṇahila agreed on condition that the city should be called by his name. Aṇahila accordingly showed Vanarája the place. The city may have been called after some local chief since it was popularly known as Aṇahilaváḍa (Sanskrit:Aṇahilaváta) that is "the place of Aṇahila". In the Prabandhachintámaṇi, Merutuṇga gives 746 CE (S. 802) as the date the installation of Vanarája, while in his Vicháraśreṇi the same author gives 765 CE (S. 821 Vaisakha Śukla 2) as the date of the foundation of the city. The discrepancy may be explained by taking 746 CE (S. 802) to refer to the date of Vanarája's getting money enough to fix the site of his capital, and 765 CE (S. 821) to refer to the date of his installation in the completed Aṇahilaváḍa. Vanarāja secured the support of rich merchants by giving them administrative positions, such as his chief minister Jamba.

Vicháraśreṇi gives 765 (S. 821) seems the more probable date for the installation as the Prabandhachintámaṇi says that Vanarája got himself installed at Aṇahilapura when he was about fifty. (Note: The text is “Pañcháśatavarshadesyaḥ.”) This accords with the date fixed on other grounds. Placing Vanarája's birth at about 720 CE would make him 44 in 765 CE (S. 821) corresponding to date mentioned in the Vicháraśreṇi. Merutuṇga in both his works gives the length of Vanarája's life at 109 and of his reign at sixty years. The figure 60 seems to mark the length of his life and not of his reign. So long a reign as sixty years is barely possible for a sovereign who succeeded late in life, and the 109 years of his life can hardly be correct. Taking Vanarája's age at 45 when he was installed in 765 CE (S. 821) and allowing fifteen years more to complete the sixty years, he probably died circa 780 (S. 836), the closing year of his reign.

It is unclear that he had a war with Arab or not as mentioned in Navsari copperplate (739 CE).

=== Successors ===
The lists of Vanarája's successors vary so greatly in the names, in the order of succession, and in the lengths of reigns, that little trust can be placed in them. The first three agree in giving a duration of 196 years to the Chávaḍá dynasty after the accession of Vanarája. The accession of the Chaulukya dynasty founder Mularaja is given in the Vicháraśreṇi at Saṃvat 1017 and in the Prabandhachintámaṇi at Saṃvat 998 corresponding with the original difference of nineteen years (S. 802 and 821) in the founding of the city. This shows that though the total duration of the dynasty was traditionally known to be 196 years the order of succession was not known and guesses were made as to the duration of the different reigns. Certain dates fixed by inscriptions or otherwise known to some compilers and not known to others caused many discrepancies in the various accounts.

=== Table of successors ===
Rulers/Works	Relation	Prabandha-chintámaṇi		Ratnamálá		Vichára-śreṇi		Sukṛita-sankírtana	Dates calculated by Campbell (1896)	
Jayashekhara		1		1		1		1	1	
Vanaraja	son of Jayashekhara	2	60 years	2		2	60 years	2	2	r. 765-780 CE
26 years gap or reign of Vanaraja was till 806 CE?
Yogaraja	son of Vanaraja	3	35 years	3	35 years	3	29 years	3	3	r. 806-841 CE
Ratnaditya	son of Yogaraja?					4	3 years	4	4	r. 842-845 CE
Vairisimha	son of Yogaraja?					5	11 years	5	5	r. 845-856
Kshemaraja	son of Yogaraja	4	25 years			6	39 years	6	6	r. 856 - 880 CE
Chamunda	son of Kshemaraja					7	27 years	7	7	r. 881-908 CE
Bhuyada	same as Chamunda?	5	29 years						7	r. 881-908 CE
Vairisimha		6	25 years							
Ratnaditya		7	15 years							
Gaghada	son of Chamunda					8	27 years	8 (as Rahada)	8	r. 908-937 CE
Samantasimha	same as Gaghada?	8	7 years						8	r. 908-937 CE
Bhubata	son of Gaghada							9	9	r. 937-961 CE
unnamed	son of Gaghada, same as Bhubata?					9	19 years		9	r. 937-961 CE

=== Yogaraja ===
According to the calculations given above Vanarája's reign lasted to about CE 780. Authorities agree that Vanarája was succeeded by his son Yogarája. The length of Yogarája's reign is given as thirty-five years by the Prabandhachintámaṇi and the Ratnamálá, and as twenty-nine by the Vicháraśreṇi. That is according to the Prabandhachintámaṇi and Ratnamálá his reign closes in CE 841 (S. 897) and according to the Vicháraśreṇi in CE 836 (S. 891). On the whole the Prabandhachintámaṇi date CE 841 (S. 897) seems the more probable. The author of the Vicháraśreṇi may have mistaken the 7 of the manuscripts for a 1, the two figures in the manuscripts of that date being closely alike. If CE 780 is taken as the close of Vanarája's reign and CE 806 as the beginning of Yogarája's reign an interval of twenty-six years is left. This blank, which perhaps accounts for the improbably long reign and life assigned to Vanarája, may have been filled by the forgotten reign of a childless elder brother of Yogarája.

Of Yogarája the Prabandhachintámaṇi tells the following tale. Kshemarája, one of Yogarája's three sons, reported that several ships were storm-stayed at Prabhása or Somanátha. The ships had 10,000 horses, many elephants, and millions of money and treasure. Kshemarája prayed that he might seize the treasure. Yogarája forbade him. In spite of their father's orders the sons seized the treasure and brought it to the king. Yogarája said nothing. And when the people asked him why he was silent he answered: "To say I approve would be a sin; to say I do not approve would annoy you. Hitherto on account of an ancestor’s misdeeds we have been laughed at as a nation of thieves. Our name was improving and we were rising to the rank of true kings. This act of my sons has renewed the old stain. Yogarája would not be comforted and mounted the funeral pyre".

=== Kshemarája ===
According to the Prabandhachintámaṇi in CE 841 (S. 898) Yogarája was succeeded by his son Kshemarája. The Vicháraśreṇi says that Yogarája was succeeded by Ratnáditya who reigned three years, and he by Vairisiṃha who reigned eleven years. Then came Kshemarája who is mentioned as the son of Yogarája and as coming to the throne in CE 849 (S. 905). The relationship of Yogarája to Ratnáditya and Vairisiṃha is not given. Probably both were sons of Yogarája as the Prabandhachintámaṇi mentions that Yogarája had three sons. The duration of Kshemarája's reign is given as thirty-nine years. It is probable that the reigns of the three brothers lasted altogether for thirty-nine years, fourteen years for the two elder brothers and twenty-five years for Kshemarája the period mentioned by the Prabandhachintámaṇi. Accepting this chronology CE 880 (S. 936) will be the date of the close of Kshemarája's reign.

=== Chámuṇḍa ===
According to the Vicháraśreṇi and the Sukṛitasankírtana Kshemarája was succeeded by his son Chámuṇḍa. Instead of Chámuṇḍa the Prabandhachintámaṇi mentions Bhúyada perhaps another name of Chámuṇḍa, as in the Prabandhachintámaṇi the name Chámuṇḍa does not occur. The Prabandhachintámaṇi notes that Bhúyada reigned twenty-nine years and built in Aṇahilaváḍa Patan the temple of Bhúyadeshvar. The Vicháraśreṇi gives twenty-seven years as the length of Chámuṇḍa's reign an insignificant difference of two years. This gives CE 908 (S. 964) as the close of Chámuṇḍa's reign according to the Vicháraśreṇi.

=== Ghaghaḍa ===
After Bhúyada the Prabandhachintámaṇi places Vairisiṃha and Ratnáditya assigning twenty-five and fifteen years as the reigns of each. The Vicháraśreṇi mentions as the successor of Chámuṇḍa his son Ghaghaḍa who is called Ráhaḍa in the Sukṛitasankírtana. Instead of Ghaghaḍa the Prabandhachintámaṇi gives Sámantasiṃha perhaps a title of Ghághaḍa's. The Vicháraśreṇi gives Ghaghaḍa a reign of twenty-seven years and mentions as his successor an unnamed son who reigned nineteen years. The Sukṛitasankírtana gives the name of this son as Bhúbhaṭa. According to these calculations the close of Ghághaḍa's reign would be CE 936 (Saṃvat 965 + 27 = 992). Adding nineteen years for Bhúbhaṭa's reign brings the date of the end of the dynasty to CE 956 (Saṃvat 993 + 19 = 1012) that is five years earlier than S. 1017 the date given by the Vicháraśreṇi. Until some evidence to the contrary is shown Merutuṇga's date CE 961 (S. 821 + 196 = 1017) may be taken as correct.

Ratnaditya was succeeded by Samantsimha (also known as Chuyadadeva) who ruled seven years. Samantsinh Chavda did not have any children so he adopted his nephew Mularaja who overthrew him c. 942 and established the Chaulukya dynasty.

== Cultural activities ==
=== Temples ===
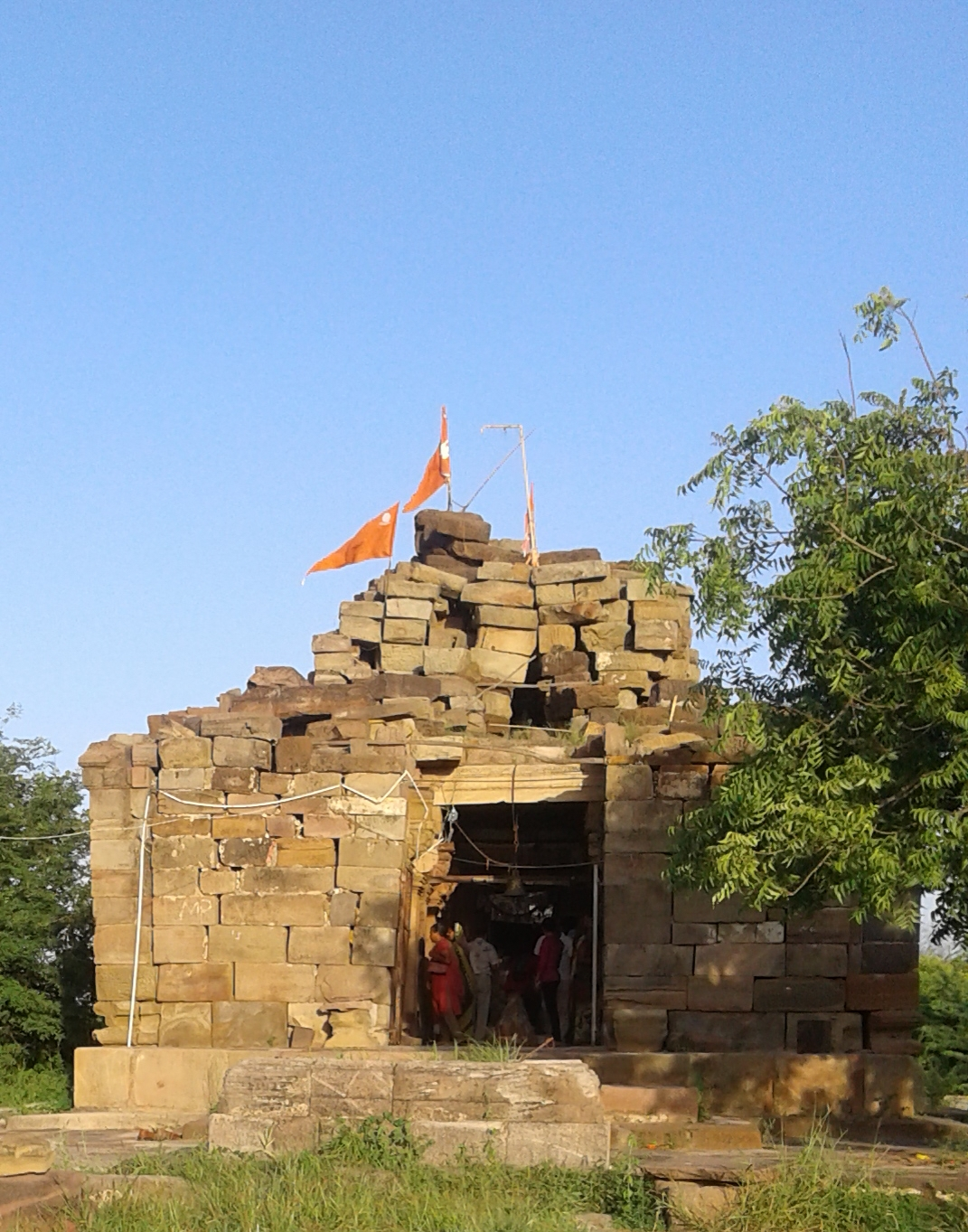
Ruined Shiva temple at Puaranogadh at Manjal, Kutch

The Merutunga's Prabandhachintamani states about Vanrajavihara temple at Anahilapathaka (now Patan, Gujarat) as well as the construction of Kanteshwari-prasada by Vanraja. Kanteshwari was the patron goddess of later Chaulukya kings too. Kumarapala has prohibited the animal sacrifice at this temple later. The Prabandhachintamani mentions the construction of the temple of Bhattaraka Shri Yogishwari by Yogaraja at Patan in the early 9th century. The Prabandhachintamani also mentions the construction of Bhuyadeshwara temple built by Bhuyada at Patan in last quarter of the 9th century. According to Haribhadra Suri (middle of the 12th century), Minister Nihhaya's son Lahara had built the temple of Vindhyavasini (Laharadhanuhavi) at Sander in Patan district. He had also founded Narangpura town and built a Panchasara Parshwanath temple for merit of his mother. In the later half of the 9th century, king Yashobhadra had built a Jain temple at Dinduanapura, which is mentioned in Purnagaccha-pattavali. According to an inscription on a bronze, king Raghusena had built Raghusena-vihara at Ramasaiyanpura in 928 CE.

The extant temples this period (Early Nagara phase) include the Roda Group of Temples, Lakodra in Vijapur Taluka, old temple at Thangadh, Ranakdevi's Temple at Wadhwan, the Sun Temple at Kanthkot, Shiva temple at Puaranogadh at Manjal in Kutch. Harishchandra-ni-Chori at Shamlaji, older Bhadreshwar Jain Temple (rebuilt now) and the Temple III of Roda Group of Temples are some other extant temples of the 9th century.

== Related dynasties and descendants ==
Based on Dharanivaraha's grant, it is known that in 914 CE, he, a Chapa or Chavda king, was ruling at Vardhamana (now Wadhwan) as a feudatory of Gurjara-Pratiharya Mahipaladeva. It also mentions his ancestors; Vikramarka, Addaka, Pulakeshin, Dhruvabhata followed by Dharanivaraha. King Vyaghramukha of the Chapa dynasty, who was a patron of the astronomer Brahmagupta and was ruling in A.D. 628, had his capital at Bhillamala (Bhinmal).

Circa 942, one of queens of Sámantasiṃha fled with her year-old child to his father's house in Jaisalmer. This son Ahipata became a formidable outlaw and he was used to ravage dominions of Anahilawada. He conquered more than 900 villages in Kutch and established Morgadh as its capital. He reigned for many years and was succeeded by his son Vikramsi. The lineage of succession was Vibhuraja, Takulji, Seshkaranji, Vaghji, Akheraja, Tejasi, Karamsinha, Takhansinha, Mokasinha, Punjaji. Punjaji lived in the reign of Alauddin Khalji around the end of the 13th century.

During the British Raj, the small Varsoda and Mansa princely states under the Mahi Kantha Agency (now in Gujarat) remained ruled by the claimed descendants of the Chavda dynasty until independence of India in 1947.
