= Shankheshwar =

- town
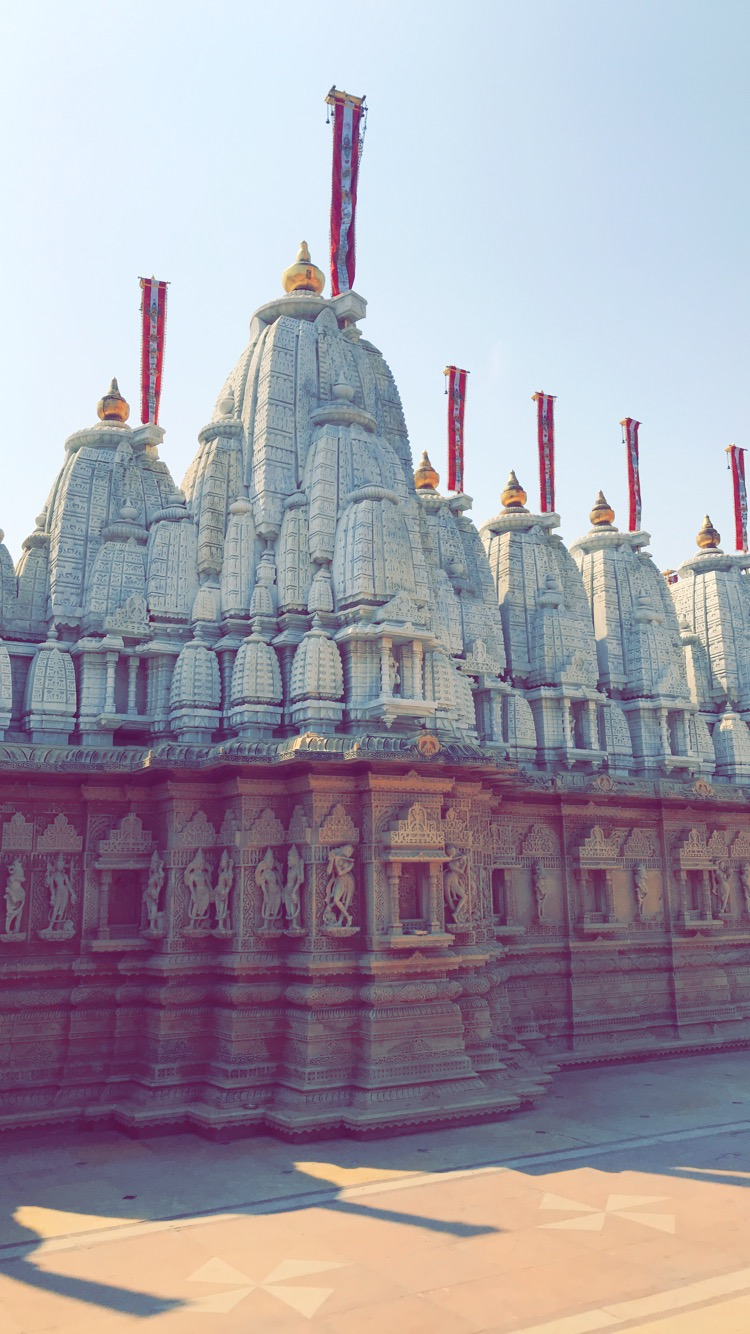
- Shankeshwarji Jain Temple

- Location in Gujarat, India Shankheshwar (India)
- Coordinates: 23.510122°N 71.7692612°E
- Country: India
- State: Gujarat
- District: Patan

Languages
  - Official: Gujarati, Hindi
- Time zone: UTC+5:30 (IST)
- PIN: 384246
- Telephone code: 912722
- Vehicle registration: GJ
- Website: gujaratindia.com

Shankheshwar is a town in the Patan district of Gujarat state of India. It is an important place of pilgrimage for the followers of Jainism.

== History ==
Jain Acharya Merutunga called it Shankhpur in his works. A temple is described as being built here in 1155. A Paliya in the north of village had date of Samvat 1322 (1265 AD). The temple of Parshwanath was built in 1811. There are ruins of old Jain temple in the town which is dated Samvat 1652 (1596 AD). There is a Chhatra and a memorial inscription dedicated to Shripujya, a high priest near it.

According to Mughal history, the Shankheshwar village was a lease-grant by Emperor Shah Jahan to Shantidas Jhaveri, a former nagarsheth (equivalent to mayor) of Ahmedabad.
