= Roda Group of Temples =

Roda Group of temples
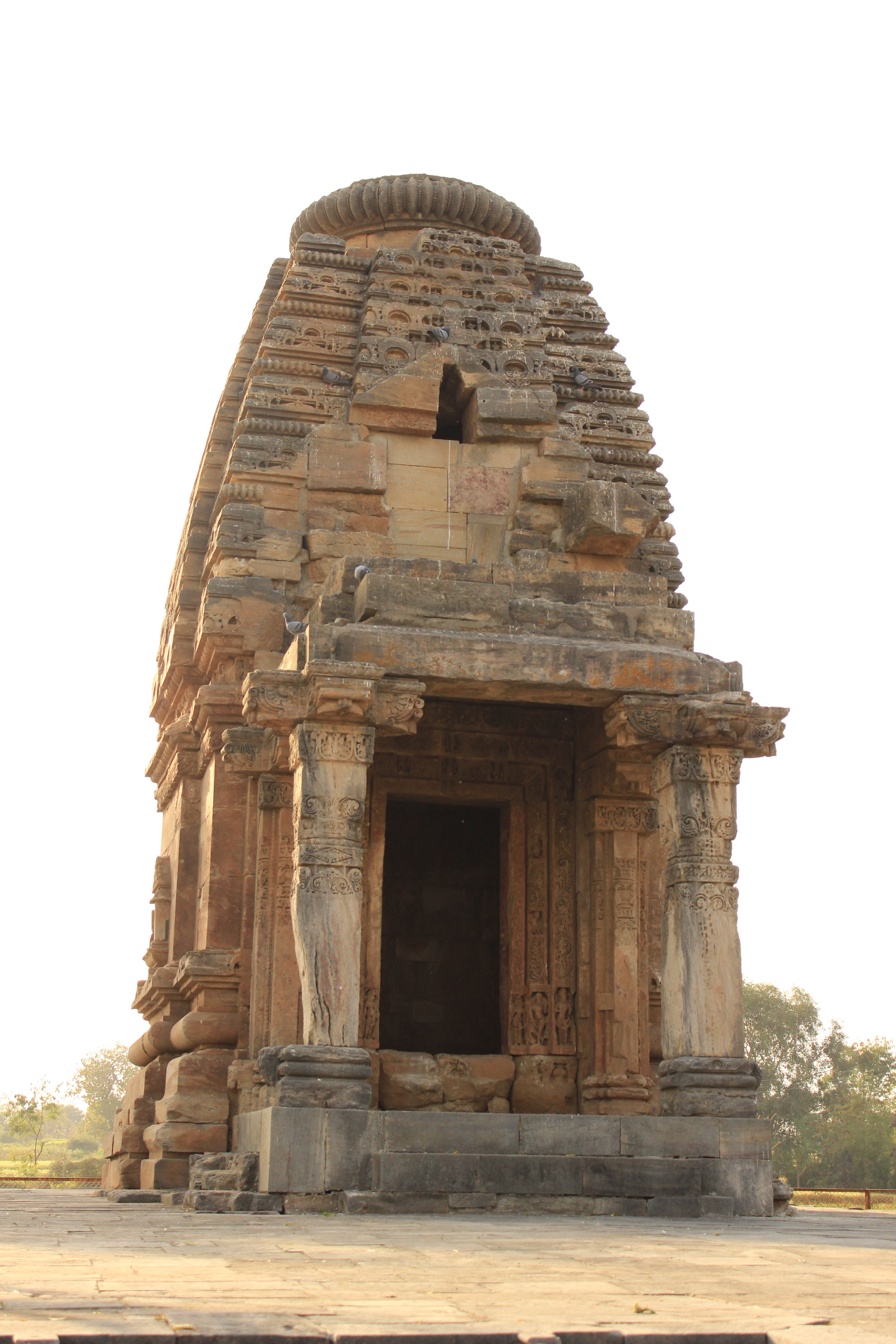
- Shiva Temple No. I

- Location in Gujarat

Religion
- Affiliation: Hinduism
- Deity: Shiva, Vishnu, Surya, Ganesha and Navagraha

Location
- Location: Raisingpura (Roda) village, Sabarkantha district, Gujarat
- Coordinates: 23°39′32.4″N 73°04′58.9″E

Architecture
- Type: Gurjara-Pratihara or Rashtrakuta
- Completed: Late eighth to ninth century
- Temple: 7

The Khed-Roda Group of Monuments include eighth-ninth century dated seven Hindu temples built during Pratihara or Rashtrakuta period. It also includes a reservoir (Kund) and a stepwell. They are located between Raisingpura (Roda) and Khed Chandarani villages, 18 km from Himmatnagar in Sabarkantha district of Gujarat, India. It is located on the bank of the seasonal stream which merges Hathmati River downstream.

== Etymology ==
Roda literally means brick-bats in Gujarati. The site derived its name from these ruins containing brickbats and an old hamlet near the site. Khed Chandrani is a nearby village.

== Archeological history ==
The site was not known to the early archeologists. It was first studied by P. A. Inamdar in 1926 followed by U. P. Shah and M. A. Dhaky in 1960s. Dhaky considered these monuments as the "great-grandfather" of the Solanki architecture of Gujarat, also known as Maru-Gurjara architecture.

== Monuments ==
There are six temples at the site and the photographic record of seventh exists. All these temples are east facing.

The first two temples are reached by road. The first one is dedicated to Shiva (No. I) and the second is the Pakshi Mandir (No. II) which has no idols but carving of birds hence also known as the bird temple. Temple No. II is the smallest temple among the group. Further 500 metres, there is a large rectangular Ladushah kund (stepped reservoir) which may had elaborately carved shrines, one on each of its four corners formerly. Of these, two shrines (No. III and V) are surviving which are dedicated to Shiva and Vishnu respectively and the base of the third (No. IV) is still between these two. Other two lost shrines may have been dedicated to Goddess and Surya. Across the stream, there is another shrine which has Navagraha depicted on its doorframe so it is known as the Navagraha temple (No. VI). Some steps away, there is a ruined temple (No. VII) which is the largest temple among the group. There are stone steps near the temple No. VII leading to the river but are in dilapidated condition. It has an image of Ganesha so it is known as the Ganesha temple and also known as the Shiva temple. These temples were damaged in 2001 earthquake but were restored later. No mortar like fixing material is used for the construction of these temples and the lower parts of these temples are held together by the weight of the spires.

The sculptures collected from the site are now housed at the Baroda Museum & Picture Gallery in Vadodara. These sculptures depict various Hindu deities including a sculpture of Surya.

The Nagrani Vav (stepwell) is located at the entrance of nearby Khed Chandarani village.

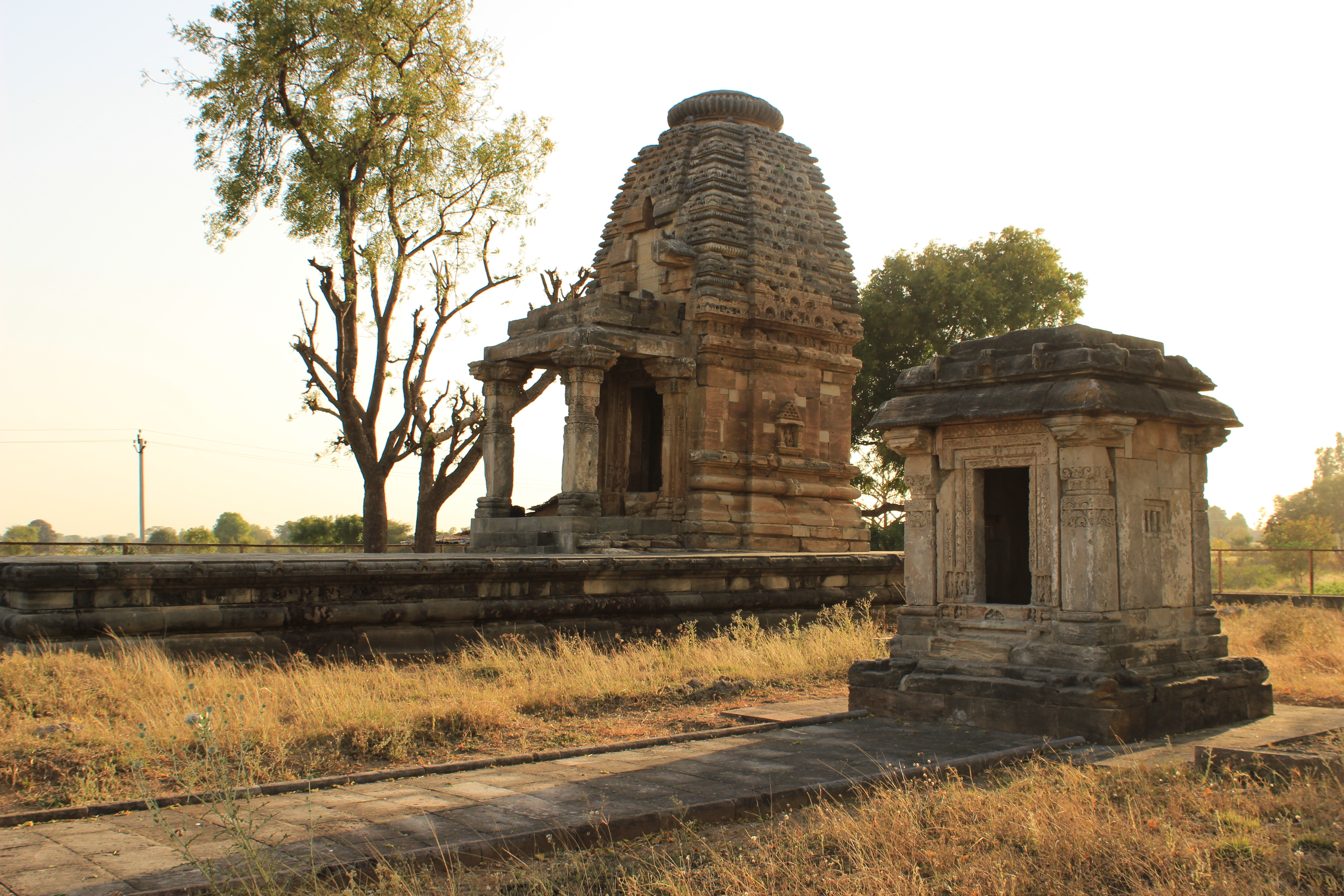
Shiva Temple (No. I) and Pakshi Mandir (No. II)

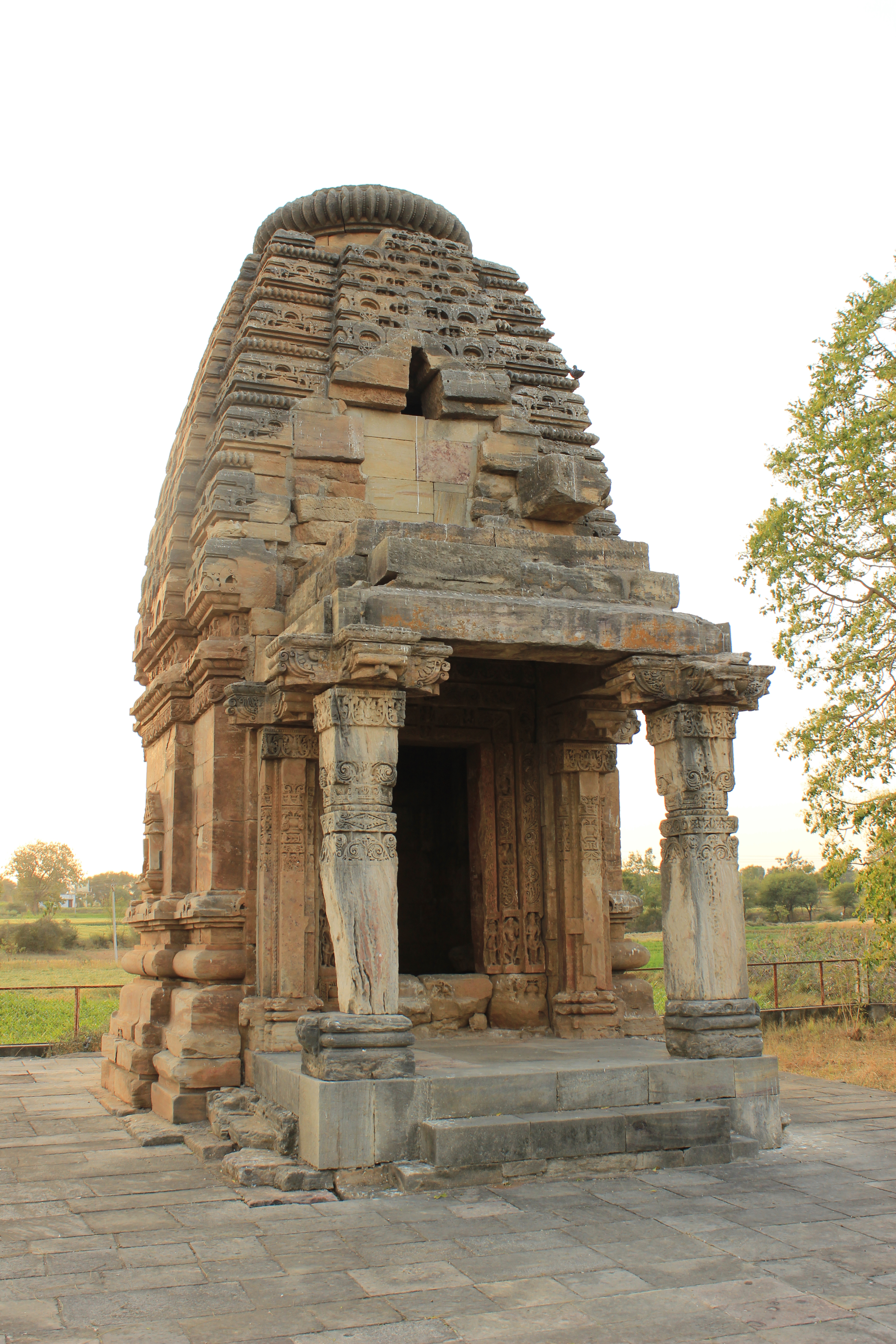
Shiva Temple (No. I)

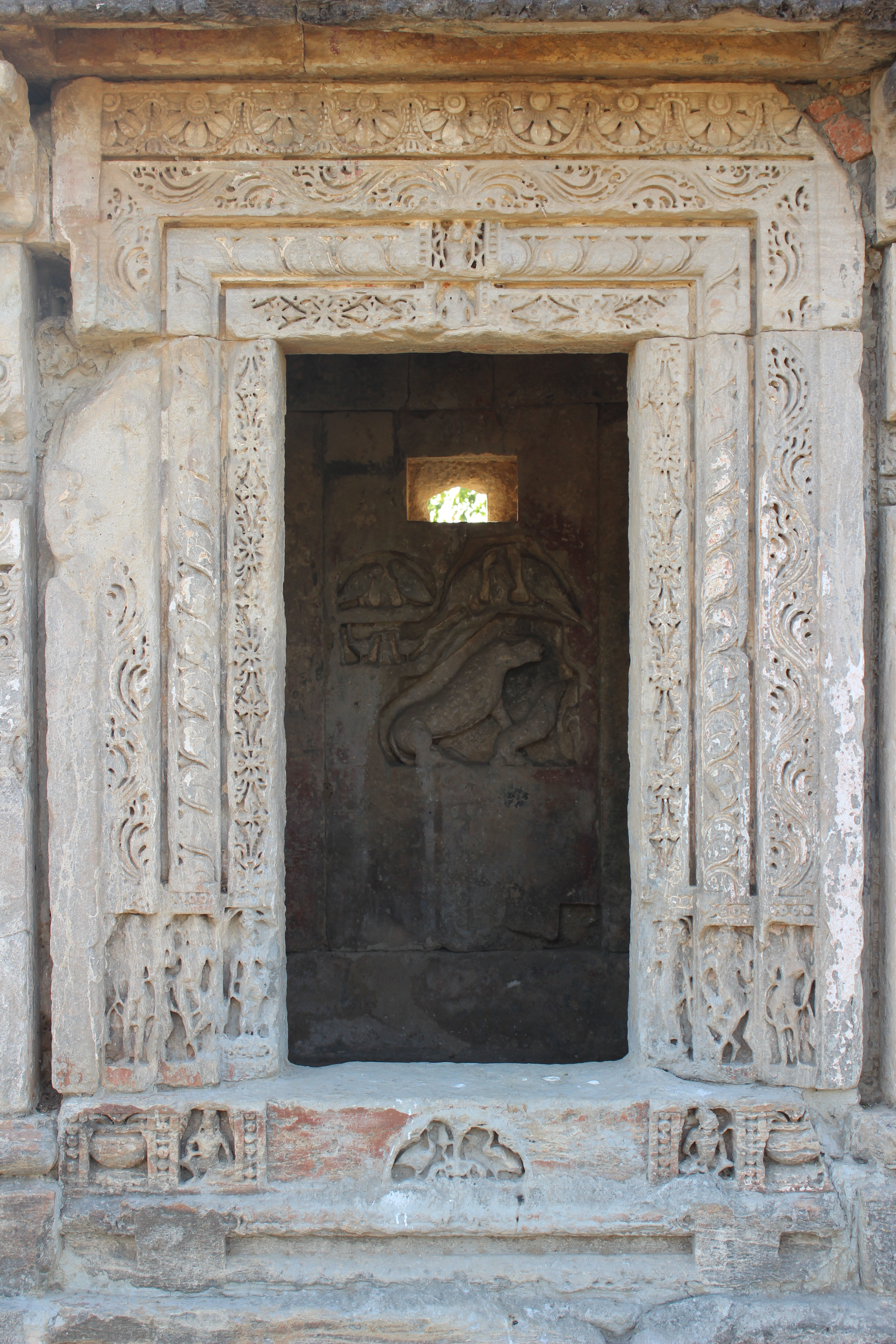
Doorframe of Pakshi Mandir (No. II) and carvings of birds inside

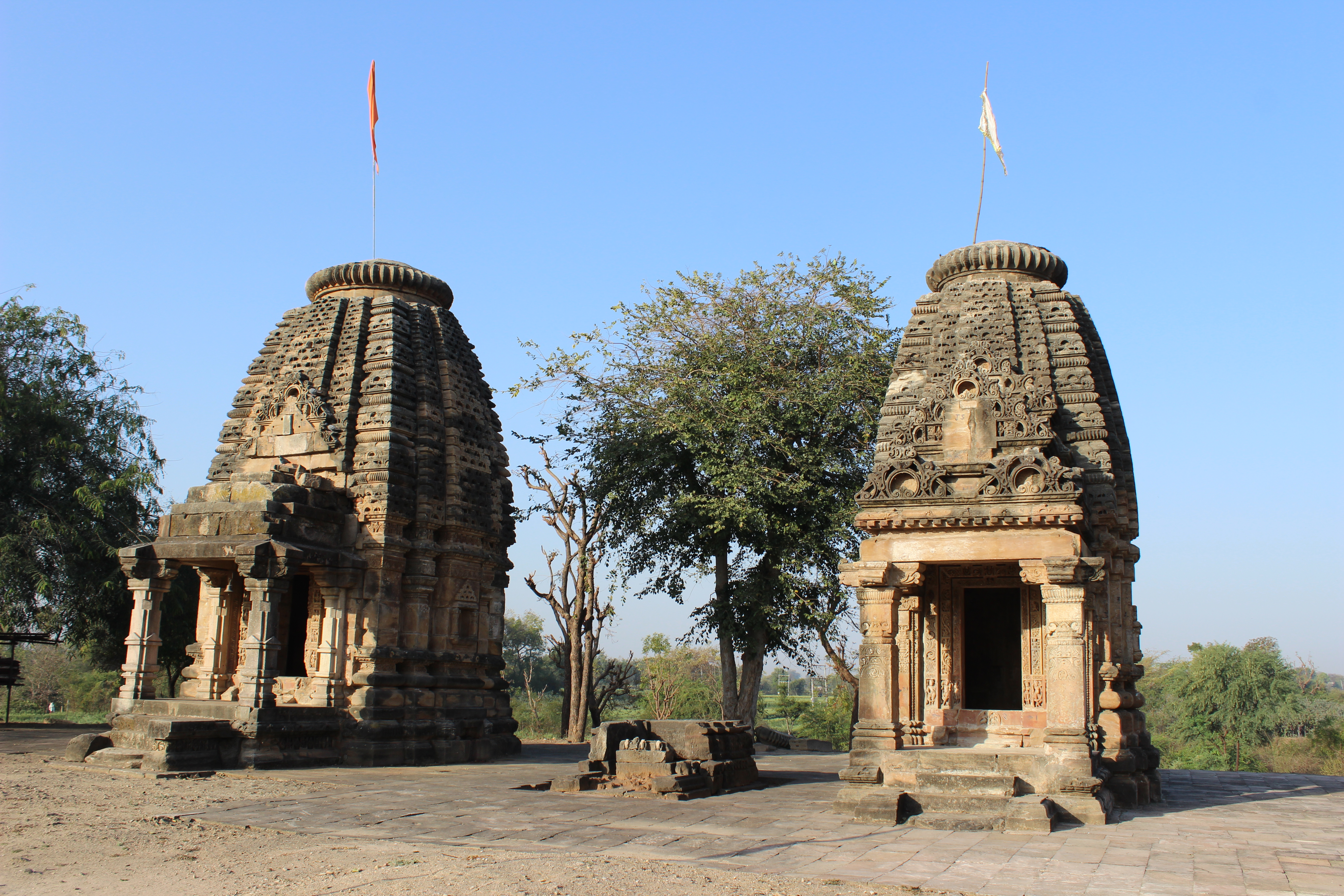
Temple No. III and V

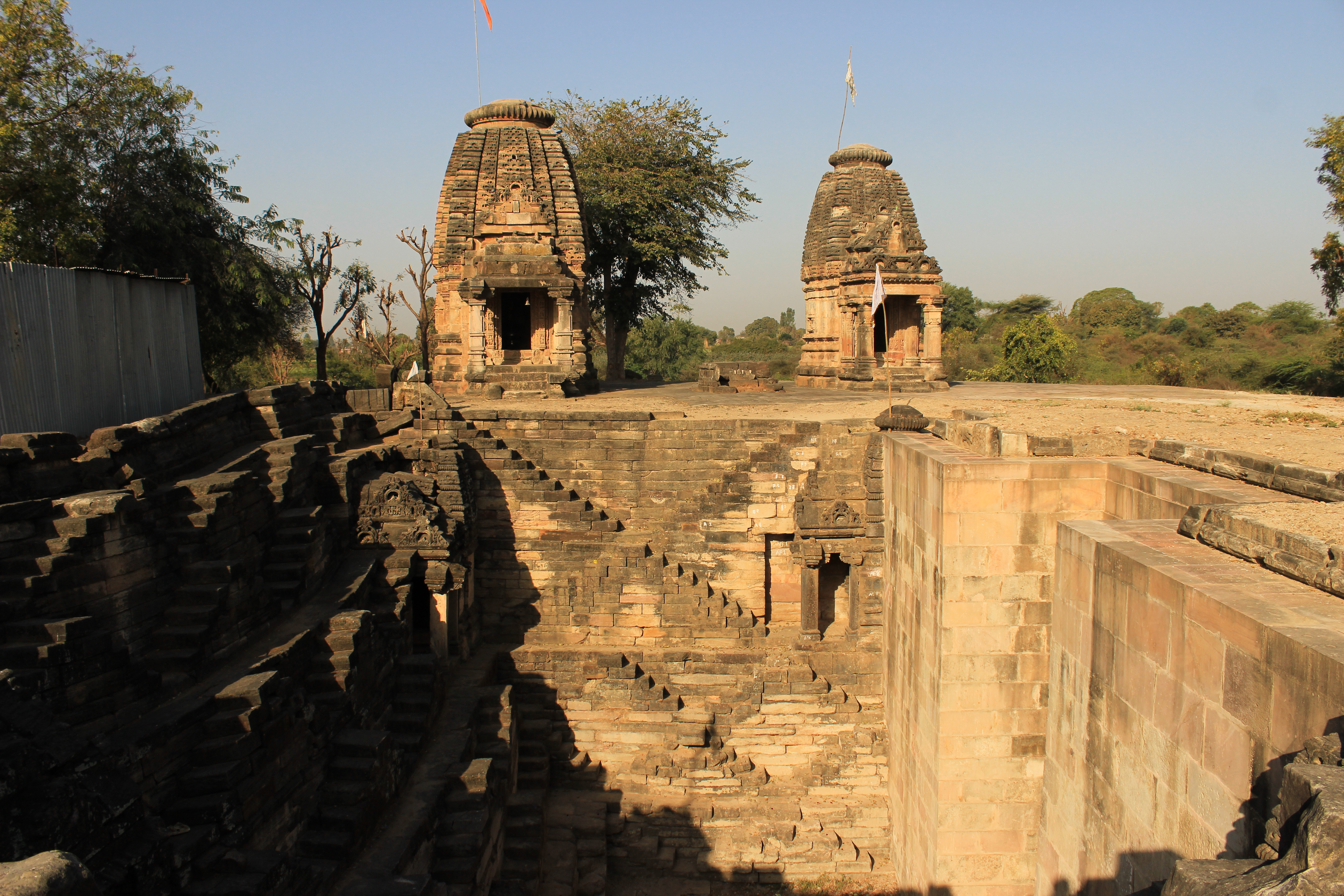
Temple No. III, V and Ladushah Kund

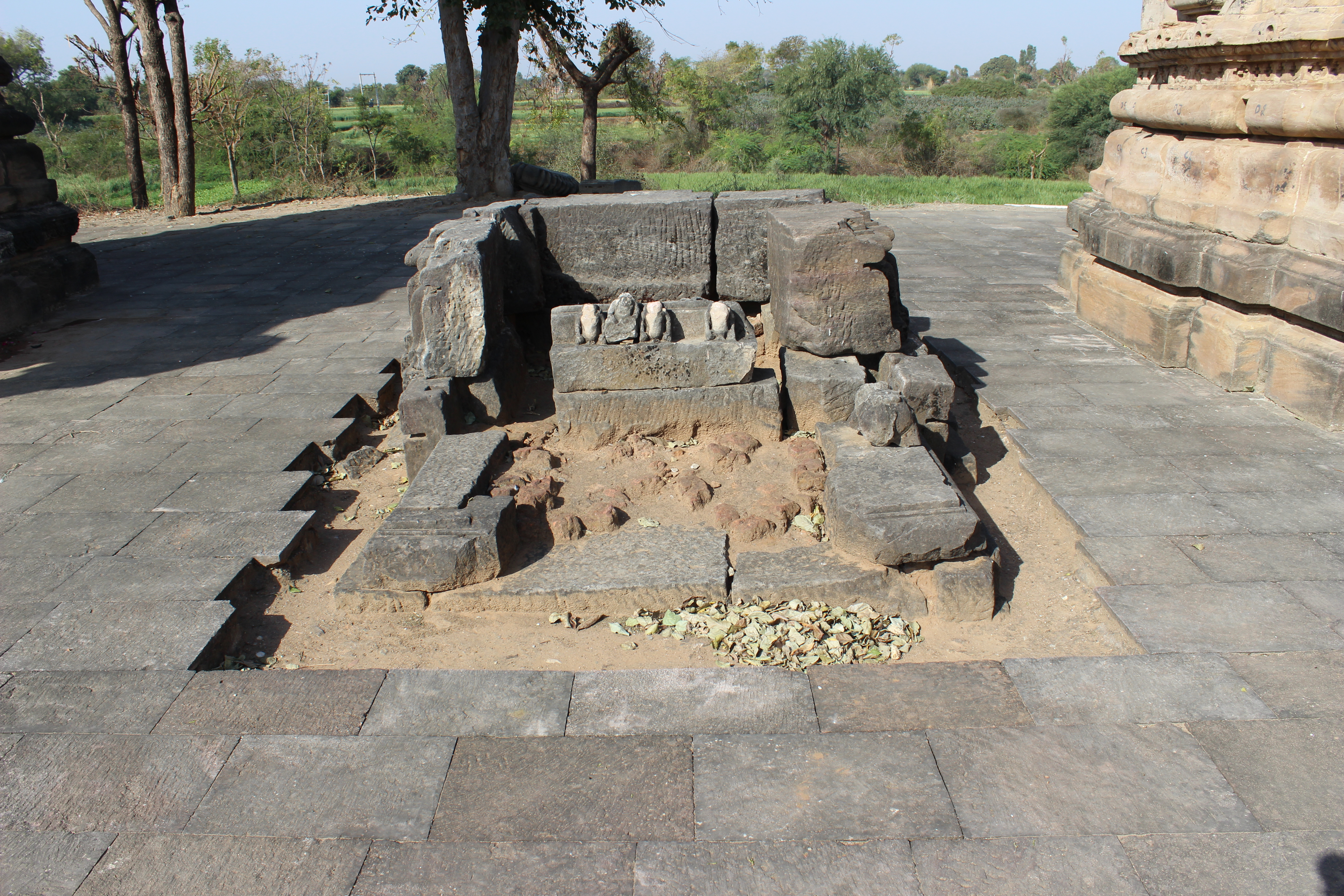
Surviving base Temple No. VI

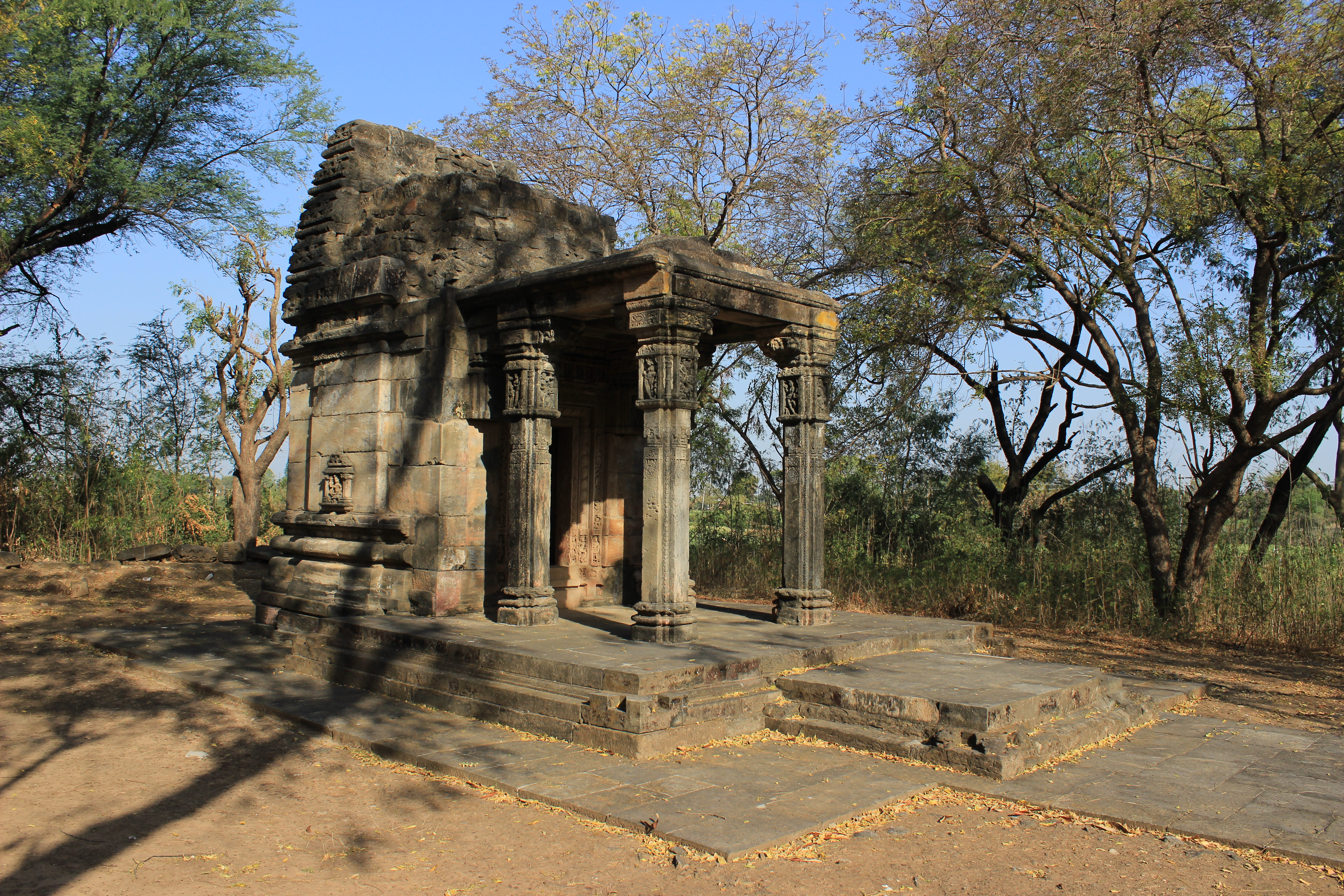
Navagraha Temple (No. VI)

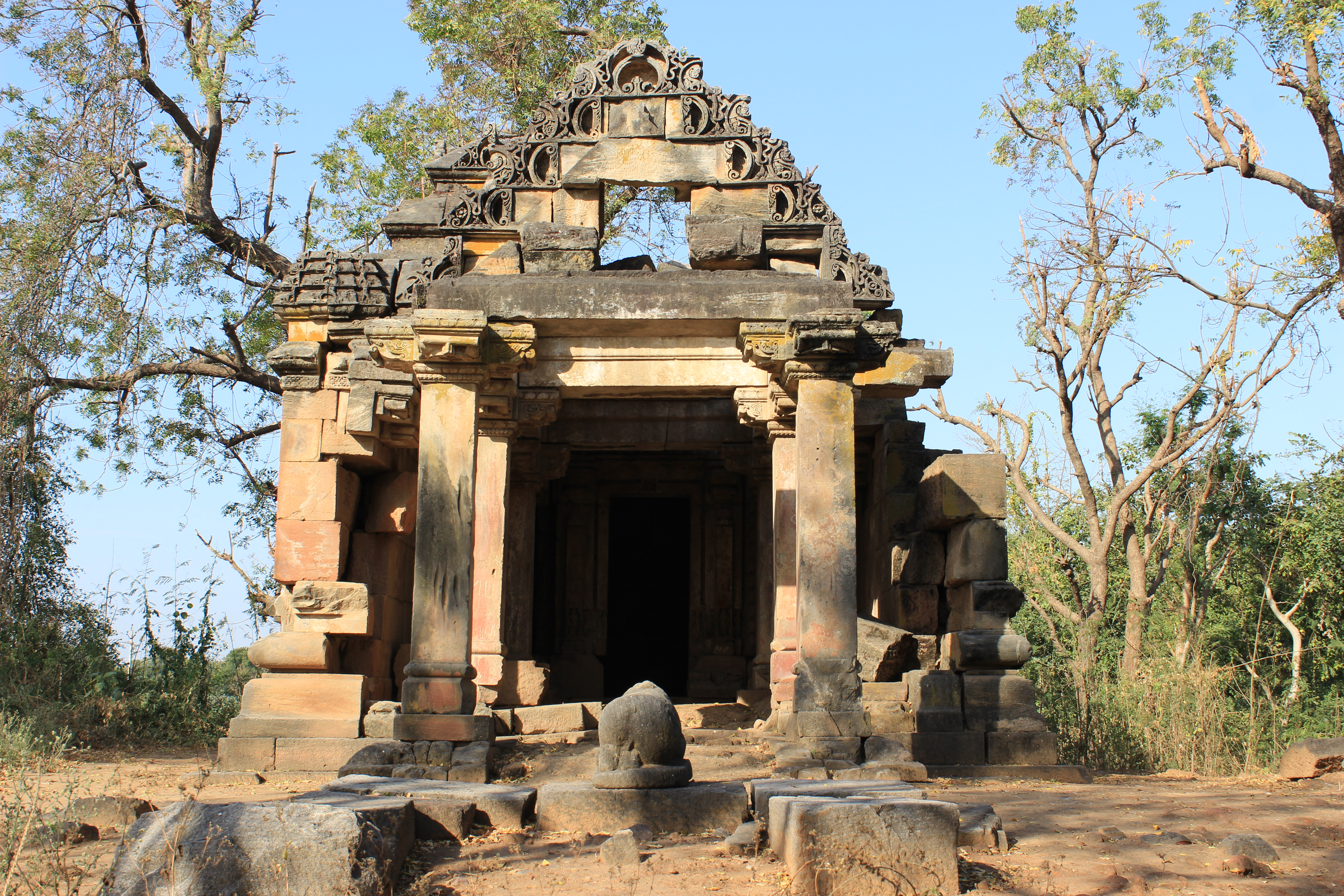
Shiva Temple (No. VII)

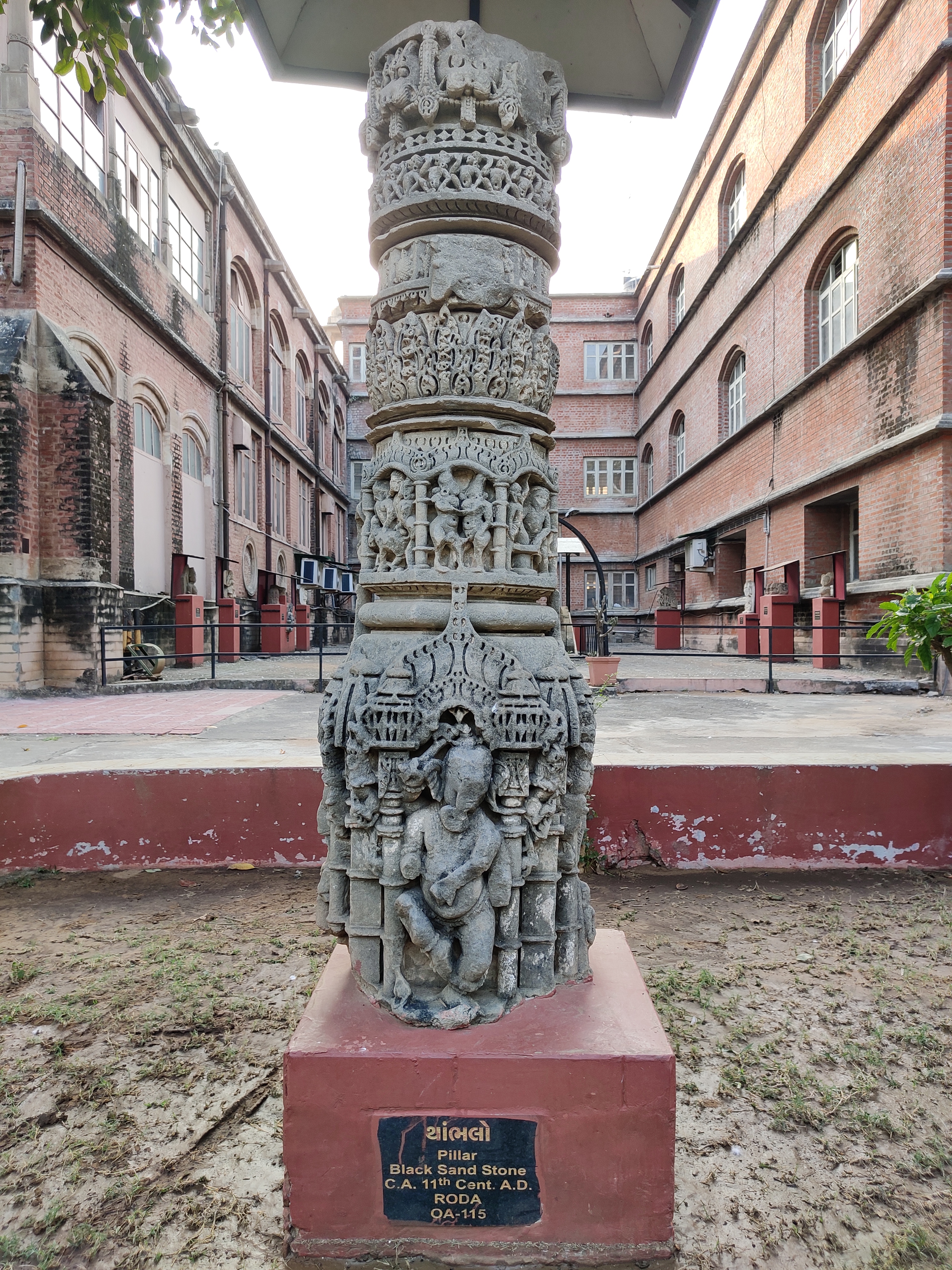
Pillar from the site now at Baroda Museum and Picture Gallery

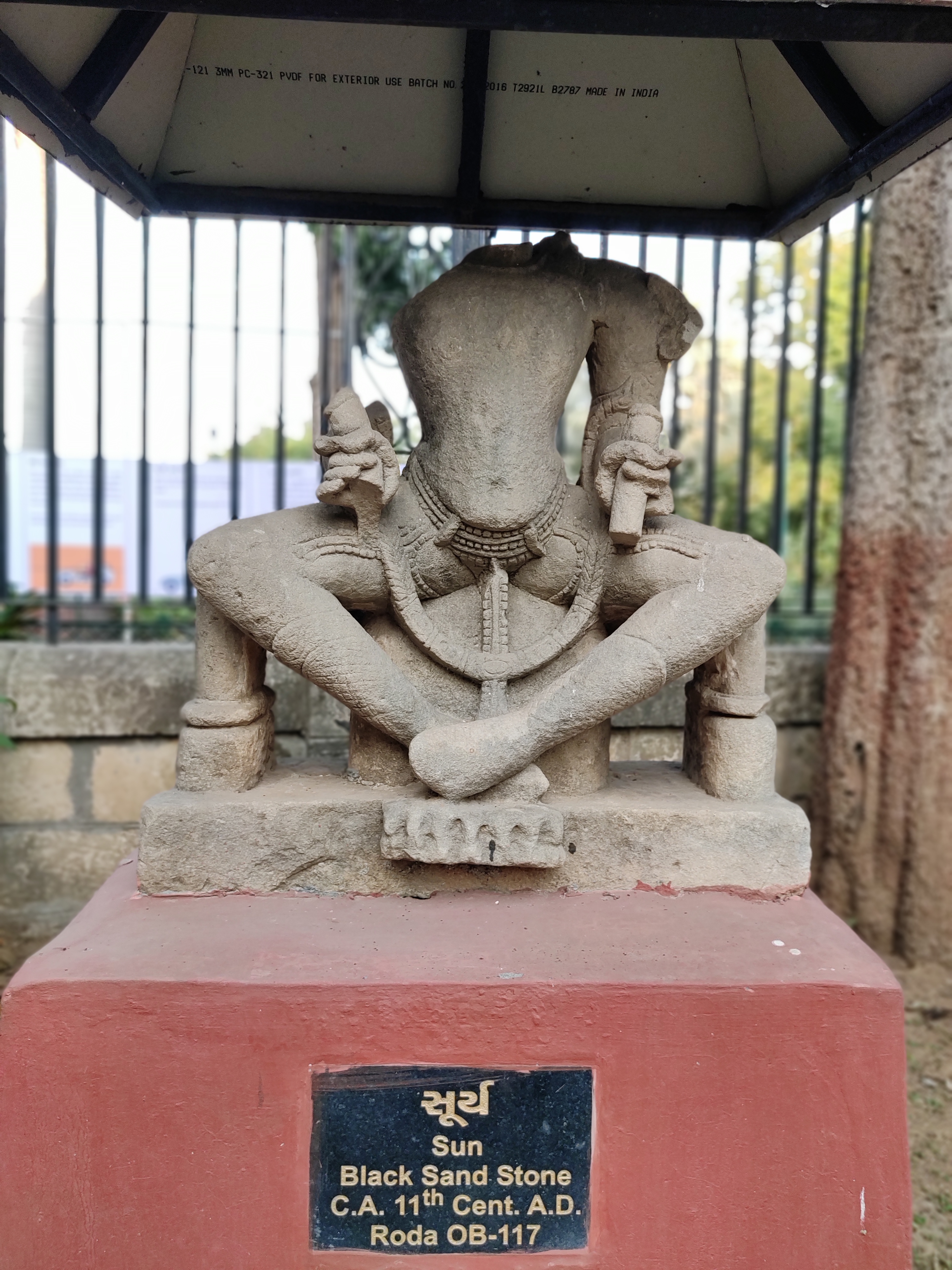
sculpture of Surya at Baroda Museum and Picture Gallery

== Architecture ==
These temples are classified under the Anarta School of Maha-Gurjara tradition of temple construction. It is the largest group of such styled temples.

The Temple No. I is nirandhara shrine with bi-partite offset (dwi-anga) plan configuration. It is situated on east-facing jagati (plinth). The entrance mandapa is of prag-griva style with four pillars. The inner sanctum is square. The plinth has moldings of bhita and pattika. The circumvention path (pradakshina) is provided by space on the plinth. The outer walls of the shrine is devoid of ornamentation. The mandapa has phansana (pyramidal superstructure with decreasing number of mouldings) type roof and the latina type spire over the main shrine has elaborate bold jala pattern carvings. It is topped by large amalaka. The Temple No. II It has a phansana styled spire, not usual latina spire, like shrines found in Saurashtra. The Temple No. III is almost similar to Temple No. I except its tri-partite offset (tri-anga) plan configuration. The Temple No. VII has a gudhamandapa with a porch while other temples have prag-griva as in Temple No. I. Except No. VII, the pillars of these temples are of ruchaka type with carved upper parts. The ceilings are mostly flat with floral or other geometric carvings. These temples has elaborate carvings only on the doorways of small sanctuaries of the temples and porch columns. The carvings of basement is fewer and heavy. The sculptures of Narsimha, Trivikrama and Varaha is on the walls of Vishnu temple. There is a Shiva temple (No. VII) near the curve of the river. It has gudhamandapa (closed hall) with phansana styled roof indicating the style of roof developed later in 11th century. There is also Vishnu temple (No. V). It had ornamented doorway but has no detailed sculptural ornamentation.

The kund is collapsed on the northern side. There are four shrines with small porches and idols in the each corner of the kund. They are dedicated to saptamatrikas, Vishnu, Ganesha and Goddesses. It is an earlier example of such kund.

== Dating ==
There is no dated inscription in these temples. These temples belonged to late eighth to ninth century (post-Maitraka period). Based on style of temples and similarity with other temples, they are built during the rule of either Gurjara-Pratiharas or Rashtrakutas during the two centuries long period of tripartite struggle for control of the region. There is an idol of Shiva-Parvati found near the site (now in Baroda Museum) which had an inscription dated Samvat 1104 (1048 CE). So it is assumed that the construction may have continued at the site for about two centuries. The nearby Nagrani Vav (stepwell) has an inscription of Samvat 1474 (1418 CE).

== Preservation ==
The site is inscribed as the Monument of National Importance (N-GJ-176) and is maintained by Vadodara Circle of Archeological Survey of India. Nearby Nagrani stepwell is the State Protected Monument (S-GJ-361) maintained by the Archeology Department of Government of Gujarat.

Temple No.	Name	Coordinates
	Ladushah Kund	23.659032°N 73.083052°E
No. I	Shiva temple	23.659959°N 73.079749°E
No. II	Pakshi temple (Bird temple)	23.660060°N 73.0798291°E
No. III	Shiva temple	23.658944°N 73.0828719°E
No. IV	Only base of the temple	23.659008°N 73.082854°E
No. V	Vishnu Temple	23.659052°N 73.082860°E
No. VI	Navagraha temple	23.65826°N 73.08302°E
No. VII	Ganesh/Shiva temple	23.65705°N 73.08212°E
	Nagrani Vav (stepwell)	23.664303°N 73.096359°E
