= List of Grade I heritage structures in Pune =

There are 79 heritage structures designated as Grade I in the Pune Municipal Corporation heritage list.

== List of Grade I heritage structures ==
Name	Image	Location	Notes
Agakhan Palace Complex (Kasturba Gandhi Samadhi and Grounds)		Nagar Road, Yerawada Pune; 18.55240°N 73.90152°E	
Ahilyabai Holkar Ghat, Sangmeshwar Temple & other temple		Near Sangam Bridge, approach from RTO end, RB Motilal Road - 1; 18.53017°N 73.86105°E	
Amruteshwar- Siddheshwar Temple Complex		Plot R.No. A /804, OPP. Tilak bridge, Shaniwar peth - 30; 18.52087°N 73.85351°E	
Baloba Munja Mandir		Kasba Peth - 11; 18.52173°N 73.85667°E	
Belbaug Temple Complex and Garden		177/178 Budhwar Peth, Belbaug Chowk near City post, Laxmi road - 2; 18.51565°N 73.85583°E	18th century Vishnu temple
Bhandarkar Oriental Research Institute Complex		812, Shivaji Nagar, Law College Road - 4; 18.51917°N 73.82997°E	Founded on 6 July 1917, the Bhandarkar Oriental Research Institute was formed to commemorate the work of R. G. Bhandarkar who was a pioneer of Orientology in India. The collection of the institute contains over 140,000 rare books and 28,000 manuscripts, mainly in Sanskrit and Prakrit languages.
Bharat Itihaas Sanshodhak Mandal		1321, Sadashiv peth, next to the Bharatnatya Mandir - 30; 18.51098°N 73.84998°E	
Bhavani Mata Mandir		Bhavani Peth; 18.50993°N 73.87040°E	
Bhide Wada		Budhwar Peth, 257 C/1, C/2 - 2; 18.51629°N 73.85635°E	
Botanical Survey of India		7, Koregaon Park - 1; 18.53613°N 73.88507°E	
Central Building Complex		Finance Road (BJ Medical College Road), Near Sassoon Hospital - 1; 18.52496°N 73.87336°E	
Central Post and Telegraph Office (General Post Office)		3, Connaught road - 1; 18.52296°N 73.87570°E	The current building of the post office is a Neoclassical stone structure constructed in 1900s. It replaced the original building which was built in 1873.
Chaturshringi Temple and Hill		Senapati Bapat Road, Near Pune University - 16; 18.53898°N 73.82822°E	
City Post		852 Budhwar peth, Laxmi Road - 2; 18.51561°N 73.85666°E	
College of Agriculture Complex		Shivajinagar, Ganeshkhind Road - 5; 18.53652°N 73.84403°E	
College of Engineering Pune Complex		RB Motilal Kennedy Road, Shivaji Nagar - 5; 18.53056°N 73.85678°E	
Council Hall		Bund Garden Road, Cantonment Area - 1; 18.52550°N 73.87949°E	
Deccan College complex		Deccan college road, Yerawada - 6; 18.54945°N 73.87327°E	This complex was built in 1868 for the Poona Sanskrit College with donation from Sir Jamsetjee Jejeebhoy. It was designed in neo-Gothic style by General H. St. Clair Wilkins and used grey stone for its construction.
Dhakta Sheikh Salla Dargah		Sheikh Salla Dargah road, 1278 Kasaba peth - 1; 18.52314°N 73.85773°E	
District and Sessions Court		Shivajinagar, beyond the Mutha river between the Sangam railway bridge and the Shivaji Bridge - 5; 18.52741°N 73.85513°E	
Don Bosco Youth Centre		4, Koregaon Park Road - 1; 18.53412°N 73.88588°E	
Fergusson College Complex		On the main F.C. Road, Shivajinagar - 4; 18.52396°N 73.83921°E	
Gokhale Hall		570 Sadashiv Peth, Laxmi Road - 2; 18.51385°N 73.84910°E	
Gokhale Institute, Residence and Campus		B.M.C.C. road, Deccan Gymkhana - 4; 18.52027°N 73.83700°E	
Hari Mandir (Prarthana Samaj)		441 Budhwar peth, Located near Pasodya- Vithoba Mandir - 2; 18.51732°N 73.85844°E	
Harihareshwar Mandir		Shaniwar Peth, Near Shivaji Bridge - 30; 18.51890°N 73.85368°E	
Hirabaug Town Hall		989/1 Shukrawar Peth, Tilak Road; 18.50321°N 73.85450°E	
Jangli Maharaj Samadhi Complex		On Jangli Maharaj Road, Shivaji Nagar - 5; 18.52659°N 73.85043°E	
Jaykar Bungalow		National Film Archive Of India, P.O.Box No.810, Law College Rd - 4; 18.51564°N 73.82937°E	
Jehangir Bungalow (Garden Reach)+Water Tower		Old Bombay- Pune Road, Wakadewadi; 18.53503°N 73.85261°E	
Kala Ram Mandir Complex		59 Somwarpeth, Next to Nageshwar Mandir - 11; 18.52086°N 73.86303°E	
a) Maharshi Karve Kutir b) Karve hostel c) Anandibai Karve Prathmic Shala		M.K.S.S, Hingne - 52; 18.48754°N 73.81693°E	
Kasba Ganpati Mandir		Shri Sadashiv Nerugavkar Chowk House No.1, Kasaba Peth - 11; 18.51888°N 73.85694°E	
Katraj Dams and lakes (upper and lower)+Uchhwas+Aquaduct		Near Rajiv Gandhi Zoo, Katraj; 18.44445°N 73.86299°E	
Kesari Wada		568 Narayan Peth, N C Kelkar Rd-30; 18.51599°N 73.84902°E	
Khunya Murlidhar Temple Complex		1236, Sadashiv Peth - 30; 18.51156°N 73.85052°E	
Kumbharves Dharan (Dam)		Kasba Peth - 11; 18.52478°N 73.85752°E	
Lal Mahal		Kasba Path, next to Shaniwar Wada - 11; 18.51879°N 73.85654°E	
Laxmaneshwar Mandir		Inside Lane Opp. Apollo theater, Rastapeth - 4; 18.51898°N 73.86583°E	
Mahatma Phule Mandai Complex		92, Shukrawar Peth - 2; 18.51294°N 73.85629°E	
Mahatma Phule Wada		Ganj Peth - 42; 18.50669°N 73.86389°E	
Modi Ganpati Mandir		527, Narayan peth - 30; 18.51530°N 73.84775°E	
Nagarkar Wada (Raghunath Daji Niwas)		Tapkir galli, Budhwar peth - 30; 18.52006°N 73.85148°E	
Nageshwar Temple Complex		260, Somwar Peth - 11; 18.52118°N 73.86332°E	The main shrine of the temple has a Hemadpanthi structure with a stone roof. There's a large hall with cypress columns and cusped arches along with an onion-shaped shikhara.
Nana Wada		597, Budhwar peth, Near Vasant Theater, Shivaji Road-2; 18.51835°N 73.85599°E	The original structure of the wada was destroyed in a fire and was rebuilt during the British time with Noe-Gothic arches. Previously, New English School was run in the premises of the wada. It now houses the corporation records and offices.
Ohel David Synagogue and Memorial (Lal Dewal)		1/10, Moledina Rd., Camp - 1; 18.51937°N 73.87453°E	
Omkareshwar Temple Complex and Ghats		C.t.s. no. 233 shaniwar peth - 30; 18.51989°N 73.84893°E	This east facing temple was built between 1740 and 1761 by the Chitrav family with the support of Sadashivrao Bhau and Balaji Baji Rao. The western end consists of a square block with nine domes and the main shrine is at the center. Other three sides have pillared aisles.
Panch Haud Mission Church (Pavitra Naam Devalay)		4, 5 and 265/1 Guruwar peth - 42; 18.50555°N 73.86071°E	
Parsi Agyari		613B Nana Peth - 2; 18.51669°N 73.86586°E	
Parvati Hill, steps, Landscape and Temple complex		Parvati Hill, near Parvati Gaonthan; 18.49722°N 73.84667°E	
Pataleshwar Caves		Jangli Maharaj Road, opp. Pashankar auto., Shivaji Nagar - 5; 18.52695°N 73.84972°E	
Poonawala Bungalow (Hoshang Dalal)		87, Koregaon Park -1; 18.53463°N 73.89322°E	
Prasannyeshwar Temple		Opp Shahu udyan, opp. K.E.M hospital, Somwar peth - 1; 18.52057°N 73.86790°E	
Pune Archives (Peshwe Daftar)		12, Bund Garden Road, Opposite Council Hall - 1; 18.52605°N 73.87881°E	
Pune Nagar Wachan Mandir		181, Budhwar peth - 2; 18.51555°N 73.85604°E	
Pune Railway Station		Prince Aga Khan road - 1; 18.52937°N 73.87308°E	
a) Main Building Pune University b) Millenium Gate Police Chowky c) Main Gate Police Chowky		Ganeshkhind road, Pune University-7; 18.55322°N 73.82462°E	
Pushtimarg Mandir		Near Daruwala pul,61 Raviwar peth - 2; 18.51925°N 73.86103°E	
Indian Railway Institute of Civil Engineering		Prince Aga Khan road, Opp Metro Hotel, near Railway Station-1; 18.52858°N 73.87552°E	
Raj Bhavan Complex		Aundh / Baner Road, near Pune University - 7; 18.54475°N 73.82558°E	
Rameshwar Mandir Complex		10, 11 Shukrawar Peth, near Mahatma Phule Mandai - 2; 18.51338°N 73.85700°E	
Raste Wada Complex		501- A3, Rasta Peth, Near Apollo Theatre opp. Rupee co-op. Bank - 11; 18.52015°N 73.86508°E	The wada built by Anandrao Laxman Raste in the 18th century is home to two large courtyards, numerous halls and a ceremonial durbar hall. Cypress-shaped wooden columns support the curved brackets and ceilings. The curvilinear window chajjas take inspiration from Rajasthani architecture.
Sarasbaug Temple, Dharan & Bridge		Swargate, Mitramandal Chowk; 18.50091°N 73.85304°E	
Sasoon Hospital		Sassoon road - 1; 18.52532°N 73.87054°E	
Savarkar Smarak		Karve Road, Near S.M. Joshi Bridge; 18.51291°N 73.84082°E	
Shaniwarwada		Near Kasaba Peth, Opp. To Nana Wada - 11; 18.51916°N 73.85527°E	
Shinde Chatri and Complex		Jagtap Nagar, wanowarie, on the way to Hadapsar - 40; 18.49154°N 73.89731°E	
Simla Office (India Meteorological Dept.)		Shivaji Nagar, in front of Akashwani - 5; 18.52961°N 73.84903°E	
S.N.D.T College Complex + Zopdi		S.N.D.T. College Law college road - 4; 18.50877°N 73.82774°E	
Someshwar Mandir		Raviwar Peth - 2; 18.51377°N 73.86053°E	
St. Crispin's Church		10/12, Karve Road, Erandwana, Nal Stop - 38; 18.50877°N 73.83188°E	The church was built in the early 1900s and had a neo-Gothic architecture. Over the years, the structure has changed but the pointed arches and flying buttresses are still there.
St. Mathew's Church		19, Ambedkar Road, camp - 1; 18.52058°N 73.87292°E	
St. Paul's Church		2, Church road near G.P.O. behind Old market, camp - 1; 18.52221°N 73.87499°E	The church was built in 1866. Its heavy-buttress design was inspired by Sainte-Chapelle in Paris. The entrance has pointed-arched windows with a bell tower adjacent to it.
Tambdi Jogeshwari Temple and complex		Shri Tambdi Jogeshwari / Yogeshwari Trust, 33 (A) Budhwar Peth - 2; 18.51660°N 73.85487°E	
Thorla Sheikh Salla Dargah and Campus		Shaniwar Peth, Near Shivaji Bridge - 11; 18.52127°N 73.85435°E	
Trishund Ganpati Mandir		On the banks of Nagzari, somwar peth - 11; 18.52170°N 73.86183°E	This 18th-century stone temple was built by the nomadic Gosavi community which houses an idol of Ganesha with three trunks. British officers are depicted on the lower right corner with a rhino, that was probably seen by Gosavis during their travel to eastern India.
Tulshibaug Mandir Complex		177/178, Budhwar Peth-2; 18.51381°N 73.85536°E	Built in mid-18 century, the temple complex is located on one acre of land. Initially, it housed a small group of temples dedicated to Rama, Ganesha and Shiva. Over the years, it has added shrines, halls, rest rooms, music galleries as well as a shopping area. A 140 feet high shikhara in Maratha style was added in the 19th century.
Vishrambaugwada		Thorale Bajirao road Opp. Tulshibaug, Sadashiv peth - 2; 18.51407°N 73.85374°E	
Vitthalwadi Temple Complex and Ghat		Near Vitthalwadi bus stop, Sinhagad road - 51; 18.48254°N 73.825676°E	
