= List of Grade III heritage structures in Pune =

There are 90 heritage structures designated as Grade III in the Pune Municipal Corporation heritage list.

== List of Grade III heritage structures ==
| Name | Image | Location | Notes |
|---|---|---|---|
| All India Radio | | Pune University Road, Shivajinagar-16; 18.53092°N 73.84930°E | |
| Anand Ashram | | Ganpatrao Nalawade chowk, near NMV, Budhwar Peth-2; 18.52066°N 73.83159°E | |
| Ardeshir Baug complex and Campu | | Nana Peth; 18.51572°N 73.85387°E | |
| Balaji Mandir, Bhawani Peth | | Bhavani Peth; 18.50958°N 73.87128°E | |
| Bank of Maharashtra | | Bajirao Road, Opp. Vishrambaug Wada-02. 18.51380°N 73.85402°E | |
| Bhangya Maruti Mandir | | 617, Budhwar Peth-02; 18.51716°N 73.85617°E | |
| Bharatishwar Mahadeo Mandir | | Bhausaheb Pandurang Chavan chowk-02 18.51846°N 73.86172°E | |
| Bhikardas Maruti Temple | | Madiwale colony, 1911, Sadashiv Peth-30; 18.50776°N 73.85280°E | |
| Biniwale Wada | | 595, Budhwar Peth-02; 18.51831°N 73.85526°E | |
| Cecilia Building | | 941, Nana Peth-2; 18.51470°N 73.87244°E | |
| Chaphekar Smarak | | Ganeshkhind Road-7; 18.53562°N 73.83800°E | |
| Chhatrapati Shivaji Audyogik Prashikshan Sanstha | | Shivaji Road; 18.50966°N 73.85805°E | |
| Christ Prem Seva Sangh | | Shivajinagar, near Agricultural College-5; 18.53382°N 73.84886°E | |
| Church of Holy Angels | | 84, Rasta Peth-11; 18.51764°N 73.86799°E | |
| Dagdi Nagoba Temple | | Bhausaheb Pandurang Chavan Chowk-2; 18.51830°N 73.86176°E | |
| Dagdusheth Dutta Mandir | | 1098, Budhwar Peth-2; 18.51466°N 73.85661°E | |
| Dashnam Gosavi Sanstha Math and Temple | | 432, Somwar Peth-1; 18.52294°N 73.86833°E | |
| Daulat House | | Nana Peth; 18.51361°N 73.87237°E | |
| Deccan Gymkhana Police station | | Prabhat Road, Deccan Gymkhana-4; 18.51422°N 73.84050°E | |
| Deccan Gymkhana Post office | | Deccan Gymkhana Road-4; 18.51509°N 73.84206°E | |
| Deojibaba Math and Samadhi | | 494, Ganesh Peth-2; 18.51901°N 73.86161°E | |
| Diwan House | | 45, Koregaon Park-1; 18.53346°N 73.88967°E | |
| European Tombs | | Photozinco Press Road-1; 18.52212°N 18.52212°E | |
| Florence Bungalow | | 950, Nana Peth-2; 18.51435°N 73.87197°E | |
| Ganpati – Phadke wada | | Tapkir Galli, Budhwar Peth-2; 18.51786°N 73.85876°E | |
| Golden Rock House | | Opp Deccan Gymkhana, Tatyasaheb talim path-4 18.51587°N 73.84155°E | |
| Gosavipura Chhatri - Ramji Gosavi Mandir | | Near 15 August Chowk, Somwar Peth-11; 18.52259°N 73.86816°E | |
| Government Polytechnic Old Building | | Ganeshkhind, University Road-16; 18.53883°N 73.83195°E | |
| Hotel Blue Nile | | P. Jog marg-1 18.52734°N 73.87748°E | |
| Hotel Homeland | | 18, Wilson Garden, Near Pune railway station-1 18.52734°N 73.87390°E | |
| Hotel Milan | | 19, Wilson Garden, Near Pune railway station-1 18.52735°N 73.87368°E | |
| Hotel Ritz | | Sadhu Vaswani Marg-1; 18.52354°N 73.87660°E | |
| Hotel National | | 14, Wilson Road, Near Pune railway statio 18.52775°N 73.87445°E | |
| Jageshwar Temple | | Near Railway station - 411001 | |
| Jhanshichi Rani Kanyashala | | Sadashiv Peth, Shanipar-30; 18.51291°N 73.85291°E | |
| Johari Mahadeo | | Sadashiv Peth-30; 18.51295°N 73.84947°E | |
| Joshi Shriram Mandir | | 750, Kasba Peth-11; 18.51933°N 73.85324°E | |
| Kadbe Ali talim | | 483, Shaniwar peth-30 18.51871°N 73.85423°E | |
| Kaka Kuwa mansion | | Budhwar Peth, Laxmi Road; 18.51419°N 73.85431°E | |
| Kali Jogeshwari Mandir | | 275, Budhwar peth-2 18.51514°N 73.85694°E | |
| Kanheyalal Saraf building | | 870,871,872 Ravivar Peth; 18.51590°N 73.85931°E | |
| Laxminaryan temple | | Raviwar peth, Opp Someshwar Temple-2; 18.51375°N 73.86035°E | |
| L.I.C Building | | Branch No. 988, laxmi road 18.51338°N 73.84449°E | |
| Limbaraj Maharaj temple | | Budhwar peth-2 18.51437°N 73.85389°E | |
| Maharashtra Mandal Talim | | On main Tilak Rd, Limayawadi, Sadashiv Peth; 18.50953°N 73.84785°E | |
| M.E.S Boys Highschool | | 1214-1215, Limayewadi, Sadashiv Peth-30; 18.51103°N 73.84760°E | |
| Modern High school | | Jangli Maharaj Road, Shivajinagar-5; 18.52475°N 73.84885°E | |
| Murlidhar Mandir | | 219, Narayan Peth; 18.51458°N 73.84567°E | |
| Murlidhar Mandir (Maheshwari Murlidhar Mandir) | | Guruwar Peth, Near Panch Haud Mission- 42; 18.50666°N 73.86079°E | |
| N.M. Wadia Hospital Old Building | | Survey no.283, Subhashnagar, Behind BSNL office, Shukrawar Peth-30; 18.50687°N 73.85492°E | |
| Nana Haud | | 592, Budhwar peth, Opp. Nana Wada-2; 18.51832°N 73.85641°E | |
| Nanasaheb Peshwe Samadhi | | Below S.M. Joshi Bridge-4; 18.51203°N 73.84249°E | |
| Navloba Complex | | Swargate, Saras Baug Corner; 18.50110°N 73.85429°E | |
| Nivdungya Vithoba | | 571/572, Nana Peth; 18.51587°N 73.86607°E | |
| Panchaleshwar Mandir | | Lakdi Pul; 18.51399°N 73.84223°E | |
| Pandav caves/ Mandir | | Wadarwadi-16; 18.52542°N 73.83437°E | |
| Patrya Maruti Temple | | Narayan Peth-30; 18.51536°N 73.85004°E | |
| Perugate Police Chowkey | | 1227, Sadashiv Peth-30; 18.51142°N 73.84877°E | |
| Phani Ali Talim | | 61, Kasba Peth-11; 18.51987°N 73.85745°E | |
| Pune District Central Co-op Bank Ltd | | Near City Post Office, Budhwar Peth-2; 18.51569°N 73.85744°E | |
| Pune Vidyarthi Griha and Ram Mandir | | 1786, Sadashiv Peth - 411030; 18.50920°N 73.85109°E | |
| Ram Bhuvan | | Tilak Road, Sadashiv Peth-30; 18.50903°N 73.84830°E | |
| Temple in Narsimha Bhavan | | 73, Kasba Peth-11; 18.51990°N 73.85768°E | |
| Ruiia Bungalow | | Mangaldas road-1 18.53304°N 73.88252°E | |
| Sadashiv Peth Haud; Nagoba Gumthi; Vishweshwar Temple | | Sadashiv Peth-30; 18.51339°N 73.85026°E | |
| Samadhi and temples at Omkareshwar Ghat | | Shaniwar Peth-30; 18.52053°N 73.85032°E | |
| Sapindya Mahadeo Mandir | | Kasba peth, Shaniwar Wada Chowk-11; 18.52266°N 73.85676°E | |
| Saraswat Colony Ganpati mandir/ Mahadeo Mandir | | Saraswat Colony, somwar peth-11 | |
| Sardar Mudliar House | | 334, RastaPeth; 18.51947°N 73.86496°E | |
| Shiv Mandir in S V Union | | 322, Somwar Peth-11; 18.52114°N 73.86738°E | |
| Shivaji Nagar railway station Old Building | | Shivajinagar-5; 18.53173°N 73.85114°E | |
| ShriRam Mandir, Near Panchmukhi Maruti | | Shukrawar Peth, Near Panchmukhi Maruti-2; 18.50945°N 73.85939°E | |
| Siddheshwar Mandir | | Mangalwar Peth, Near Kamla Nehru Hospital; 18.52266°N 73.86259°E | |
| Siddhivinayak Ganapati Mandir | | 398, Ganesh Peth, Dulya Maruti Chowk; 18.51607°N 73.86304°E | |
| Sonya Maruti Temple | | Sonya Maruti chowk 18.51602°N 73.85936°E | |
| South Court no 12 | | 45, Koregaon Park-1; 18.53345°N 73.88819°E | |
| St. Emmanuel’s Church | | 12, Napeir Road, Nr M G Bus Stand, Nana Peth; 18.50317°N 73.88320°E | |
| St. Felix High School Old Building | | 4, Boat club- Bund Garden Road; 18.54061°N 73.88169°E | |
| State C.I.D Branch Office | | Shivajinagar-5; 18.52908°N 73.85893°E | |
| Steps of Old Konkan Darwaza of Pandharicha Kot | | Kasba peth 18.52088°N 73.85566°E | |
| Tata Bungalow | | Opp Residency Club, Bombay pune road-1 18.52914°N 73.87803°E | |
| Temple of Maruti and Chinchechi Talim | | 237, Shukrawar Peth-2; 18.50852°N 73.85551°E | |
| Temple in Sugandhi Chowk, Kasba/ Maruti Mandir Sugandhi Chowk | | Sugandhi Chowk, Kasba Peth-11; 18.51881°N 73.85963°E | |
| Tilak Maharashtra Vidyapeeth Old Building | | Gultekadi, Market Yard-37; 18.49311°N 73.86496°E | |
| Trimbakeshwar Mandir | | Wyavahar Ali, Kasba Peth-11; 18.52100°N 73.86011°E | |
| Twashta Kasar Kali Temple | | 1385, Kasba Peth-11; 18.52149°N 73.85810°E | |
| Villa Maria | | 939, Nana Peth; 18.51467°N 73.87186°E | Built in 1931, this villa showcases a hybrid architectural style with Corinthian or Tuscan pilasters, quoins, sloping tiled roofs and window surrounds. |
| Vimlabai Garware High school Old Building | | karve rd 18.51355°N 73.84070°E | |
| Vinchurkar Wada | | S no. 727 A., R B Kumthekar road - 411030; 18.51324°N 73.84922°E | |
| War Memorial (Hutatma Smarak) | | War Memorial (Hutatma Smarak); 18.52407°N 73.87024°E | |
