= Peshwe Park =

- Interactive map of Peshwe Park
- 18.502377°N 73.852232°E
- Date opened: 14 March 1999
- Location: Pune, India
- Land area: 130 acres (53 ha)
- No. of animals: 362
- Memberships: CZA
- Website: pmc.gov.in/en/peshawe-park

The Peshwe Park, is located near Saras Baug in Pune, India. It is managed by the Pune Municipal Corporation. It is spread over an area of 7 acres. Now it is an energy park that stresses the importance of renewable energy in today’s times. The Adventure Park is also launched there. The idea behind the park is to remove the fear element in kids from a young age as was first mooted by its designer BS Deshmukh.

== History ==
In 1953 the Pune Municipal Corporation created Peshwe Park on about 7 acres (2.8 ha) where Madhavrao Peshwe had established a private menagerie in 1770. Located in the heart of the city at the base of Parvati Hill, this zoo exhibited animals in traditional cages.

== Details ==
The Peshwe energy park serves the purpose of using non-conventional renewable energy and spreading its awareness. This includes a biomass pavilion, hydro-energy pavilion, information pavilion, battery operated Phulrani train, solar pavilion, etc. The park also houses the children playground that includes slides, seesaw, swings, etc. There is an induction of 50 types adventure sports games and activities like net climbing, walk rope climbing, wall climbing, grappling, tower climbing, balancing, high altitude cycling, rope skidding, crossing the pond on a rope etc are just name of few (for age groups 3-16). Nearby this playground lies the Phulrani toy train which is popular from the times when the park was a zoo. The induced adventure sport activities include wall climbing, net climbing, balancing, rope slider, skyway, tower climbing and many more. The instructors here provide the safety accessories to the children and supervise their performance and actions. There are private amusement activities like merry-go-round, horse riding, slides, etc. outside its premises. Also nearby the park lies the popular Saras Baug Ganapati and Mahalaxmi temple.

A toy train called Phulrani is a popular attraction for young children here.

== Shifting of park ==
In 1986, Mr. Neelam Kumar Khaire, the first director of the park, with assistance from the Pune Municipal Corporation, created the Katraj Snake Park on land that was to become the Rajiv Gandhi Zoological Park. In 1997, in order to create a more modern zoo in accordance with the guidelines of the Central Zoo Authority of India, the municipality selected a site in Katraj and started developing a new zoo. The zoo opened in 1999 as the Rajiv Gandhi Zoological Park & Wildlife Research Centre, and initially included only the reptile park, sambars, spotted deer, and monkeys. Although it took until 2005, all of the animals from Peshwe Park were eventually moved to the new site, and Peshwe Park was closed for animal watching.
