= Sarasbaug =

- Interactive map of Sarasbaug
- 18.5008677°N 73.8529396°E
- Location: Pune, India

History
- Built: 18th Century

Site notes
- Architect: Peshwa

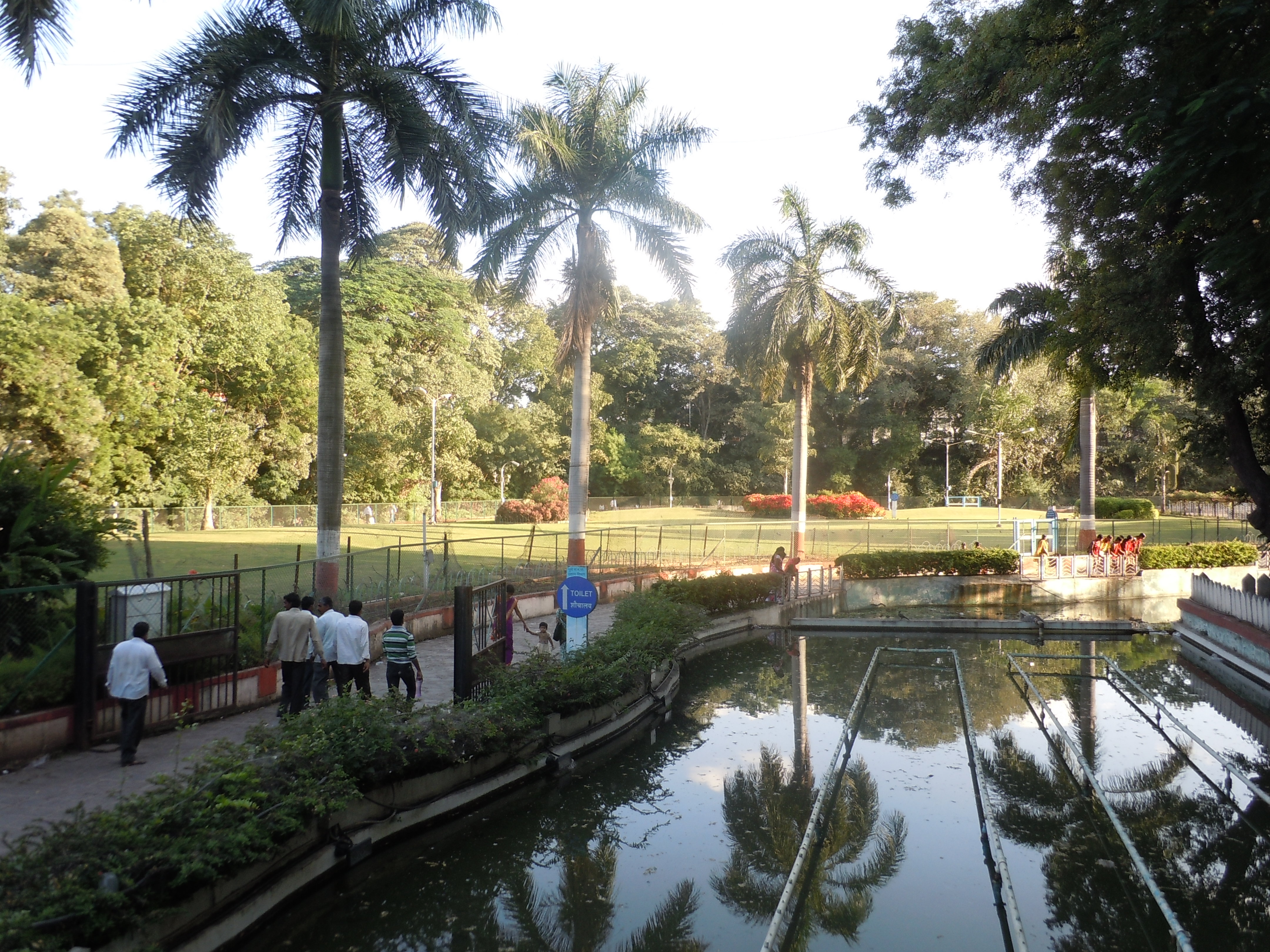
Sarasbaug

Sarasbaug is a major landmark in the city of Pune in India. The place where the park now stands was once occupied by a small artificial lake. However, the lake slowly dried up and was later developed into Sarasbaug by the PMC in the 60s. The whole 25-acre (10 ha) complex is known as Sarasbaug. The Ganesh temple in Saras Baug is also known as Talyatla Ganapati (in Marathi:तळ्यातला गणपती ) which translates to 'the Ganapati of the lake'.

== History ==
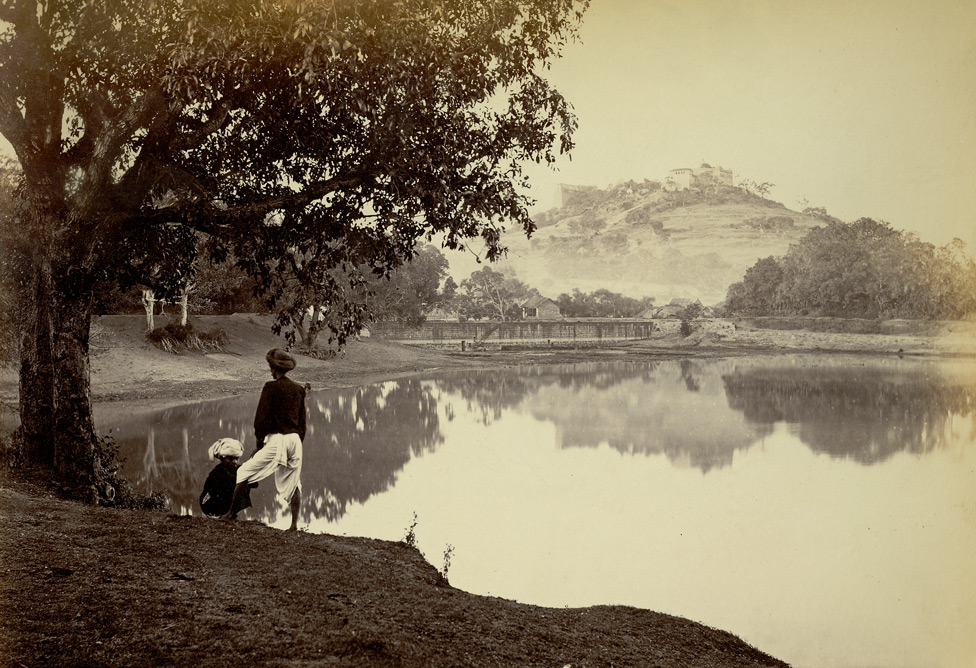
Parvati Hill from the lake in 1870

The Construction of the Temple started in 1750 under the direction of Nanasaheb Peshwa , the de facto head of the Maratha Confederacy at the time. The construction of the temple was completed in 1784 with the prana pratishtha of the statue of Ganesh in the temple. The temple was built in the lake near the Parvati Temple, which was also the primary residence of the Peshwa family. The inscription in the temple reads:

|| देवदेवेश्वर सुतं देवं | सारासोद्यान भूषणं ||
|| कल्पद्रुमां त्वां भक्तानां | वन्दे सिद्धीविनायकं ||

The temple was also used for military conferences by the Marathas against the Nizam and the British Empire in the 18th and 19th centuries, as it was situated away from the Parvati Temple. Earlier the garden was not in place and there was a lake and a small temple at the center. The temple used to be widely known as "Talyatla Ganapati" (Ganesh temple in the lake). The Peshwa, his commander, and the advisors would go into the lake by boat to discuss the issue and plans. It is also recorded that the boats were steered by non-natives like Africans for complete secrecy, as they did not understand Marathi.

Over the last two centuries, the temple and its surrounding area have been renovated many times. The last major renovation took place in 1969 under the direction of Mahadev Kumthekar and Anandrao Mane. A zoo called Peshwe Park, opened in 1953, was adjacent to Sarasbaug or the lake that predated it. Starting in 1999 until 2005, the animals at the zoo were all moved to the Rajiv Gandhi Zoological Park situated in the south of the city. This garden and temple are one of the primary landmarks of Pune.

In 1995, a small museum, displaying over a few hundred idols of Lord Ganesha, was added to the temple premises.

== Location ==
The temple was constructed at the foot of Parvati hill.

Sarasbaug is located within a kilometer from Swargate Bus Station, a ground transport station for Pune and around 6 kilometers from Pune Railway Station.

== See also ==
- Baug
