= Sarasbaug Ganpati =

Hindu Temple

Sarasbaug Ganpati Temple
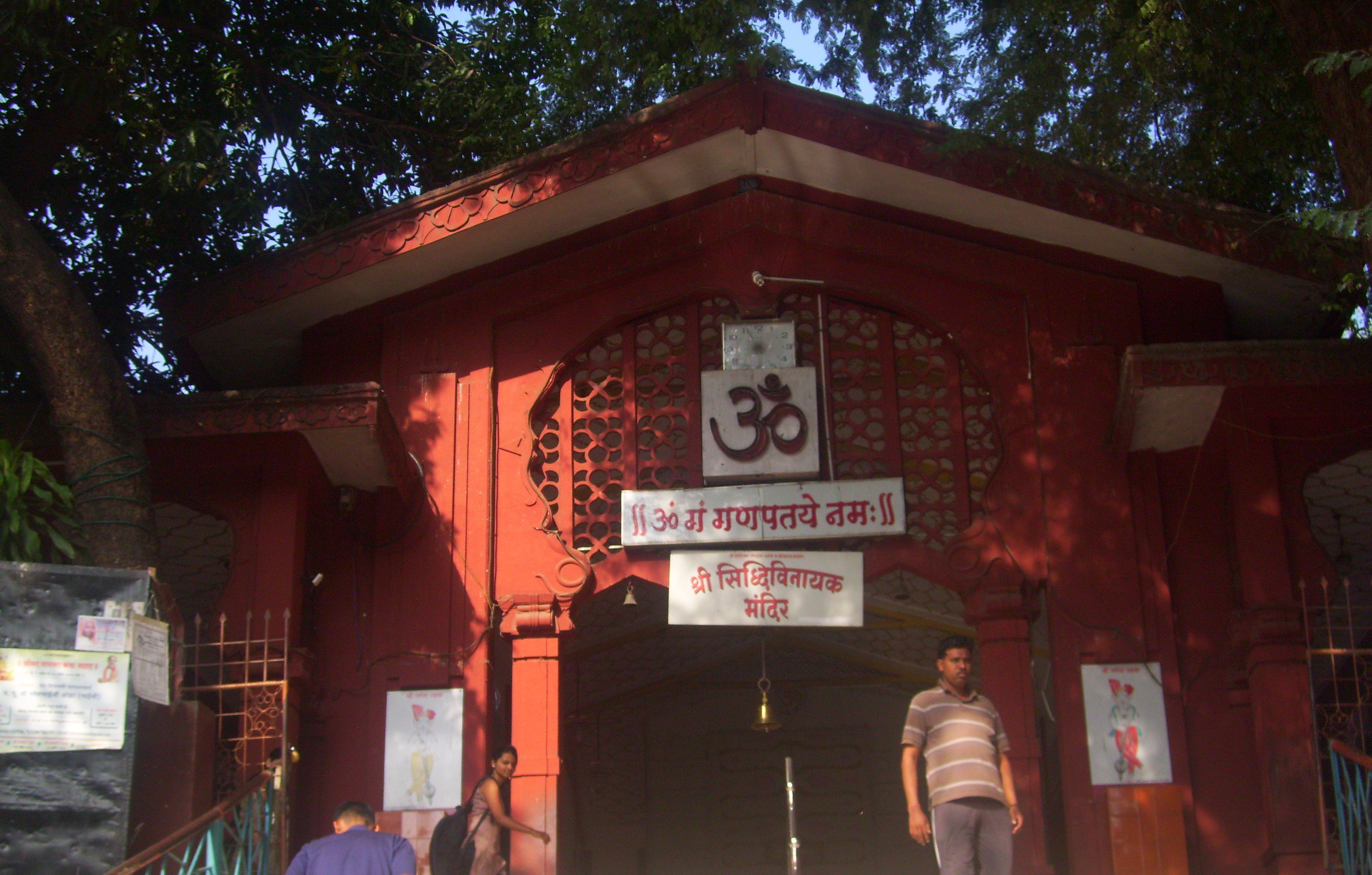

- Location in Maharashtra

Religion
- Affiliation: Hinduism
- District: Pune
- Deity: Ganesh

Location
- State: Maharashtra
- Country: India
- Coordinates: 18°30′3.173″N 73°51′10.85″E

The Sarasbaug temple houses the idol of Shree Siddhivinayak ("God who makes wishes true"). A sacred ground of faith for millions of devotees in Pune and around the world, on an average the Sarasbaug temple receives ten thousand visitors a day and this figure goes up to eighty thousand devotees per day on Ganesha Chaturthi and other special occasions. Various dignitaries and luminaries throughout India have made it a point to visit this sacred temple to seek the blessings of Shri Siddivinayak.

== Brief history ==
In the 18th century, soon after completion of Shree Devdeveshwar Temple on Parvati hill, Shrimant Balaji Baji Rao (Nanasaheb Peshwa) turned his attention towards the development and beautification of environs of Parvati hills. He decided to construct a lake at the foothills of Parvati. An island of about 25,000 sq.ft. (2,370 m^{2}) area was retained in the middle of this lake. Later on, a beautiful garden was created on this island. He gave it a poetic name, “The Sarasbaug ”.

In 1784, Shrimant Sawai Madhavrao Peshwa built a small temple in Sarasbaug and installed the idol of Shree Siddhivinayak Gajanan, the God he worshiped. Sarasbaug has now become a place of worship for people from all over the world.
