= List of Pune Municipal Corporation heritage structures =

The Pune Municipal Corporation has designated 251 properties in their area of jurisdiction as heritage structures. They are subdivided into three grades I, II and III based on their cultural, historical and architectural significance. The list was put together with the support of Indian National Trust for Art and Cultural Heritage.

== List of heritage structures ==
- Grade I
- Grade II
- Grade III

== See also ==
- List of State Protected Monuments in Maharashtra
- List of Monuments of National Importance in Maharashtra
