= List of Grade II heritage structures in Pune =

There are 82 heritage structures designated as Grade II in the Pune Municipal Corporation heritage list.

== List of Grade II heritage structures ==
Name	Image	Location	Notes
Agharkar Research Institute		4, Balchitravani- BMCC ROAD, near BMCC college - 4; 18.52066°N 73.83159°E	
Akra Maruti and Ram Mandir Complex		5, Shukrawar Peth - 2; 18.50905°N 73.85667°E	
Aryabhushan Bhavan		Fergusson college road, Shivajinagar - 5; 18.51867°N 73.84095°E	
Ashley House		42 Sasoon Road, OPP. Wadia college - 1; 18.53150°N 73.87811°E	
Ashtabhuja Durgadevi Temple		624, shaniwar peth, Ashtabhuja Durgadevi Mandir Path - 30; 18.51719°N 73.84659°E	
Aundh Shiv Mandir		Opp. University- Aundh road, Near Vitthal mandir, Aundh - 7; 18.56714°N 73.81135°E	
Aundh Vitthal Mandir		Near Aundh, Rajiv Gandhi bridge, Aundh - 7; 18.56708°N 73.81106°E	
B. J. Medical College and Hostels		Sasoon Rd., Near Babasaheb Ambedkar Chowk - 1; 18.52666°N 73.87173°E	
B.M.C.C (Brihan Maharashtra college of commerce)		845, Shivajinagar, Between Bhandarkar Rd and FC rd. - 5; 18.52122°N 73.83528°E	
Brothers Deshpande Memorial Church		Near Pawle chowk, 1365, Kasba peth - 11; 18.52178°N 73.85728°E	
Bund Garden (Fritzgerald) Bridge		Bund Garden Road, Yerawada - 6; 18.54328°N 73.88486°E	
Chandraprabhu Maharaj Digambar Jain Mandir		110 A, Guruwar Peth - 2; 18.51040°N 73.85966°E	
Commonwealth Building		Branch no. 152,600 Sadashiv peth, Laxmi rd. - 30; 18.51412°N 73.85166°E	
Dulya Maruti Mandir		Ganesh Peth, Pune; 18.51616°N 73.86291°E	
Ganesh Temple, Ganeshkhind		Ganeshkhind Road; 18.54114°N 73.82910°E	
Ganpateshwar Mandir		245, Shukrawar Peth - 30	
Gaokos Maruti Temple		Kasba Peth - 11; 18.52014°N 73.86057°E	
Ghorpade Ghat and Old Trimbakeshwar Temple		Opp. PMC Building, Shivajinagar - 5; 18.52291°N 73.85500°E	
Gundacha Ganapati		Kasba peth - 11; 18.52051°N 73.85938°E	
Harris Bridge		Bridge going towards Deccan college, Dapodi, Yerwada - 6; 18.57492°N 73.83591°E	
H.H.C.P Huzurpaga School Complex		Near cosmos bank, sadashiv peth - 30; 18.51514°N 73.85307°E	
Holkar Bridge		Khadki-3; 18.55489°N 73.86344°E	
Holkar Chatri		Khadki, Near Holkar Bridge-3; 18.55275°N 73.86340°E	
Kedareshwar Mandir		near Kasba Ganpati Mandir, Kasba peth-11 18.51931°N 73.85793°E	
Lakdi Pul Vitthal Mandir		Baburao Phuley path, Lokmanya nagar, Sadashiv Peth-30; 18.51265°N 73.84361°E	
Lakhere Maruti Mandir		Rasta Peth; 18.51728°N 73.86603°E	
Laxmibai Raste Mandir		Raste wada, Rasta Peth-11; 18.52035°N 73.86580°E	
Narayaneshwar Mandir (Mahadeo Mandir, Next to Natuwada Complex)		Plot R.No. A /804, OPP. Tilak bridge, Shaniwar peth-30 18.52161°N 73.85464°E	
Mobo's Hotel		21, Bund Garden road-1 18.53527°N 73.87916°E	
Mrutyunjayeshwar Temple		Karvenagar, On Karve Rd.-52; 18.50257°N 73.81823°E	
Mujumdar Wada		Kasba peth - 11; 18.52004°N 73.85651°E	
Nagnath Paar		Sadashiv Peth-30; 18.51239°N 73.85036°E	
Naik Wada		878/879 Shukrawar peth, near Naik hospital.-2 18.51008°N 73.85932°E	
Narpatgir Vishnu Mandir		320 Somwar. Peth opp Shahu Udyan-2; 18.52173°N 73.86490°E	
Narsimha Laxmi Mandir		1420, Sadashiv Peth-30; 18.50941°N 73.85074°E	
a) Natuwada b) Mahadev Mandir inside Natuwada		418, Shaniwarpeth-30; 18.51867°N 73.85187°E	
Navin Marathi School Complex (Raman Baug Shala)		342, Shaniwar peth-30 18.51800°N 73.84923°E	
N.M.V School (Nutan Marathi Vidyalay)		21, Budhwar Peth, Bajirao Rd.-42; 18.51535°N 73.85388°E	
New English School		Tilak Road, Opp. Sahitya Parishad-30; 18.51072°N 73.84477°E	
Office of Controller of Defence Accounts		Gultekdi Path, near Golibar Maidan, Camp-1; 18.49980°N 73.87867°E	
Das Maruti Mandir and Paar		Opp Munjaba Bol, Narayan Peth; 18.51503°N 73.85002°E	
Paar and Maruti Temple		Kasba peth, Tambat Ali Road; 18.52025°N 73.85749°E	
Paar - Bhandi Ali		Raviwar Peth, Near Police Chowky; 18.51217°N 73.85978°E	
Panchamukhi Maruti Mandir		Shukrawar Peth; 18.50956°N 73.85939°E	
Parnakuti Bungalow and hill		Yerawada-6; 18.54611°N 73.88214°E	
Pasodya Maruti Mandir		Raviwar Peth; 18.51698°N 73.85816°E	
Pasodya Vithoba Mandir		440, Budhwar Peth-2; 18.51690°N 73.85818°E	
Pavan Maruti Temple		Sadashiv Peth-30; 18.51079°N 73.84881°E	
Phadake Ganpati Temple		Sinhagad road, Opp.sharada math 18.48831°N 73.82998°E	
Photo Zinco Graphic Press		5, photo zinco press road, Near GPO; 18.52324°N 73.87358°E	
Police Motor Vehicle Transport Office (Police Chowky Complex)		Bremen Chowk, Aundh-27; 18.56253°N 73.81344°E	
Poona Club		6, Bund Garden Rd.-1; 18.52269°N 73.87890°E	The Gymkhana was a sports club setup in 1880 which had facilities for cricket, tennis, polo and badminton. It was replaced by a modern structure after independence as it was destroyed by a fire.
Prabhat Studio Complex (Film and Television Institute of India)		Law College Road-4; 18.51344°N 73.82692°E	
Ranade Institute		Fergusson college road - 4; 18.51913°N 73.84061°E	
Rokdoba Mandir Complex (incl Ram Mandir)		558, Shivajinagar Gaothan-5; 18.52352°N 73.85099°E	
S. P College Complex with Lady Ramabai Hall		Lokmanya Nagar, Sadashiv Peth-30; 18.50739°N 73.84963°E	
Sambhaji Bridge (Lakdi Pul)		Tilak Road Pune; 18.51346°N 73.84318°E	
Sangam Bridge (Wellesley Bridge)		Wellesley Road or Bombay Poona road, near RTO; 18.52978°N 73.86038°E	
Sangam Bungalow		Near Sangam Bridge-1; 18.53004°N 73.85913°E	
Shani Temple and Paar		Sadashiv Peth-2; 18.51314°N 73.85378°E	
Shinde Paar & Maruti Mandir		Narayan Peth-2; 18.51806°N 73.85009°E	
Shitaladevi Paar, near Jogeshwari Temple		Budhwar Peth-2; 18.51592°N 73.85497°E	
Shivaji Bridge (Lloyds Bridge)		Near Shaniwarwada, Opp. PMC Building, Shivajinagar-5; 18.52220°N 73.85478°E	
Shri Ram Mandir behind Tilak Smarak		Sadashiv Peth, Off Tilak Rd, Behind Tilak Smarak-30; 18.50817°N 73.84832°E	
S.N.D.T Kanyashala		591, Narayan Peth-2; 18.51630°N 73.85128°E	
Someshwar Temple and Ghats		Someshwarwadi, Baner- Pashan link rd 18.54663°N 73.79843°E	
Spicer Memorial College Complex		Aundh road, Ganeshkhind behind Pune University; 18.56381°N 73.81938°E	
SSPMS Highschool Complex & Shivaji Statue		Shivajinagar, near District Court and PMC main building-5 18.52700°N 73.85337°E	
St. Hellena's School Complex		8, Susie Sorabji Road, Opp Central Building Complex, Near GPO-1; 18.52349°N 73.87298°E	
St. Mira's Educational Complex & Sadhu Vasvani Mission		10, Sadhu Vasvani Marg, Near GPO-1; 18.52469°N 73.87605°E	
a) St. Ornella's School b) St. Ornella's Church		Quarter Gate, 433 Nana Peth- 02; 18.51630°N 73.87035°E	
Succath Shaloma Synagogue		93, Rasta Peth-1; 18.51773°N 73.86722°E	
TATA TMTC Bunglow		42, Mangaldas road, opp- Wadia college 18.53450°N 73.88178°E	
Theosophical Society		918, Ganeshwadi, Deccan Gymkhana-4; 18.51981°N 73.84007°E	
Umaji Naik Samadhi and Jail (Mamledar Kacheri)		Khadakmal Ali, Shahu Chowk, Shukrawar peth-2 18.50696°N 73.85851°E	
Untadya Maruti and Paar		Rasta Peth; 18.51951°N 73.86705°E	
Veer Maruti and Paar		Shaniwar Peth-30; 18.51946°N 73.85190°E	
Vetal Temple		Guruwar Peth-42; 18.50984°N 73.86033°E	
Vriddheshwar Temple and Ghats		563, Shivaji Nagar, Bhamburda-5; 18.52192°N 73.85057°E	
Wadia College Complex		19, V.K. Jog Path-1; 18.53303°N 73.87983°E	
Warad Gupchup Ganpati Mandir		106 Shaniwar Peth; 18.51986°N 73.85206°E	
Yerawda Jail		Samrat Ashok Path, Phule nagar, Yerwada-6; 18.56457°N 73.88965°E	
