= Chaturshringi Temple =

Chattushringi Temple Chattushringi Temple
- श्री चतु:र्श्रुंगी देवस्थान
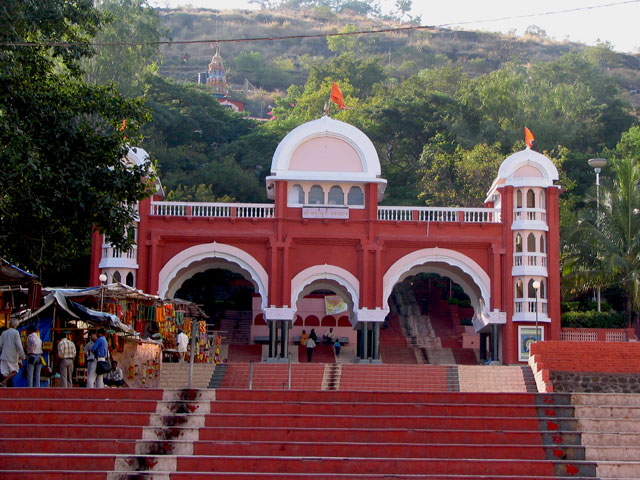

- Location in Maharashtra, India

Religion
- Affiliation: Hinduism
- Deity: Chattushringi
- Festival: Navratri

Location
- Location: Senapati Bapat Road, Pune
- State: Maharashtra
- Country: India
- Coordinates: 18°32′20.36″N 73°49′41.60″E

Architecture
- Type: West Indian
- Creator: Durlabhsheth Pitambardas Mahajan
- Completed: During Chatrapati Shivaji Maharaj's reign

Website
- http://www.chattushringidevasthanpune.org

The Chattushringi Temple also spelt as Chattushrungi Temple is a Hindu temple in the city of Pune in Maharashtra state of India. The temple is on the slope of a hill on Senapati Bapat Road and looked after by Chattushringi Devasthan (Temple) trustees.

Chattushringi (Chattu means four) is a mountain with four peaks. The Chattushringi temple is 90 feet (27 m) high and 125 feet (38 m) wide and is a symbol of power and faith. One has to climb more than 200 steps to reach the shrine of Chattushringi. In the temple premises there are also temples of Durga and Ganesh. This includes eight miniature idols of Ashtavinayaka. These small temples are located on the four separate hillocks.

The deity of the temple is Chattushringi, also known as Ambareshwari, who was considered as the presiding deity of the city of Pune. The temple is maintained by the Chattushringi Devasthan Trust. Every year a fair is held at the foothills on the eve of Navratri which thousands of people attend.

== See also ==
- List of Hindu temples in India
