= Chaturshringi Hill =

Hill in Pune, Maharashtra, India

Coordinates: 18°32′20″N 73°49′39″E

Chaturshringi Hill is a hill in Pune, Maharashtra state, India. It is the site of Chaturshringi Temple.
