= Rajiv Gandhi Zoological Park =

Pune Zoological Garden for Wildlife

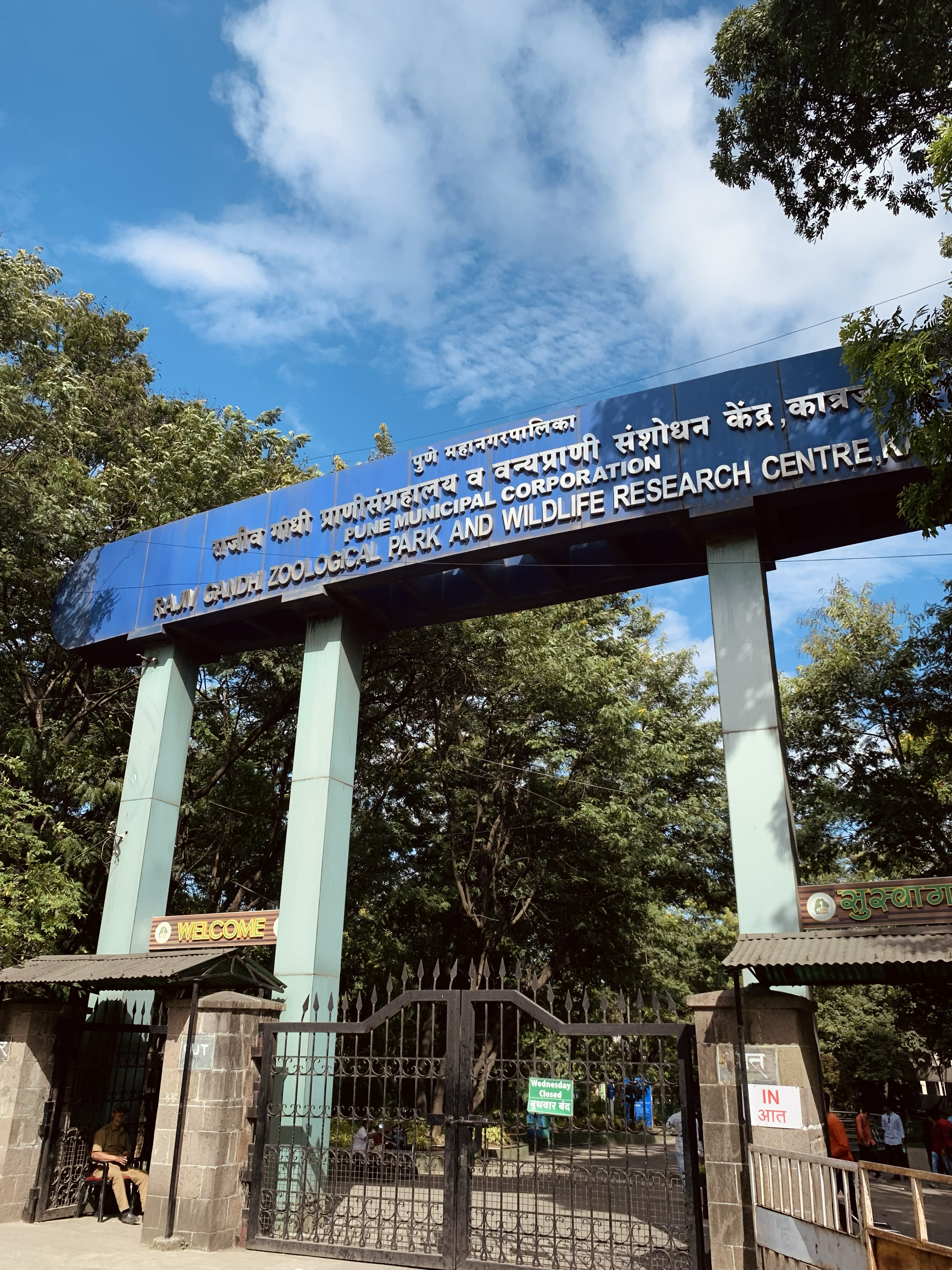
- Zoo entrance
- Interactive map of Rajiv Gandhi Zoological Park
- 18.4529061°N 73.8611752°E
- Date opened: 14 March 1999; 27 years ago
- Location: Katraj, Pune, India
- Land area: 130 acres (53 ha)
- No. of animals: 362
- Memberships: CZA
- Website: www.pmc.gov.in/en/zoo

The Rajiv Gandhi Zoological Park, commonly known as the Rajiv Gandhi Zoo or Katraj Zoo, is located in Katraj, Pune district, Maharashtra State, India. It is managed by the Pune Municipal Corporation. The 130-acre (53 ha) zoo is divided into three parts: an animal orphanage, a snake park and a zoo and includes the 42-acre (17 ha) Katraj Lake.

== History ==
In 1953 the Pune Municipal Corporation created Peshwe Park on about 7 acres (2.8 ha) where Madhavrao Peshwe had established a private menagerie in 1770. Located in the heart of the city at the base of Parvati Hill, this zoo exhibited animals in traditional cages.

In 2004, Mr. Neelam Kumar Khaire (the first director of the park), with assistance from the Pune Municipal Corporation, created the Katraj Snake Park on land that was to become the Rajiv Gandhi Zoological Park.

In 1997, in order to create a more modern zoo in accordance with the guidelines of the Central Zoo Authority of India, the municipality selected a site in Katraj and started developing a new zoo. The zoo opened in 1999 as the Rajiv Gandhi Zoological Park & Wildlife Research Centre, and initially included only the reptile park, sambars, spotted deer, and monkeys. Although it took until 2005, all of the animals from Peshwe Park were eventually moved to the new site, and Peshwe Park was closed.

The park also incorporates a rescue centre for injured and orphaned animals. It has run an animal adoption scheme since October 2010.

== Animals ==
The zoo has a collection of reptiles, mammals, and birds. Among mammals, the zoo had a white tiger and has a male Bengal tiger named Tanaji. Other mammals at the zoo include leopard, sloth bears, sambhars, barking deer, blackbucks, monkeys, and elephants. Reptiles include Indian rock python, cobra, snakes, vipers, Indian crocodiles and Indian star tortoise and birds such as peafowl also feature.

The snake park has a large collection of snakes, reptiles, birds and turtles. There are over 22 species of snakes with 10 species of reptiles comprising more than 150 individuals. This includes a 13-foot-long king cobra. Information about the snakes is provided in Braille, as well as more conventional formats, and the park includes a library. The snake park has organized many snake festivals and snake awareness programs to clarify doubts and destroy fears about snakes. During Nag Panchami, the park arranges programs to discourage ill-treatment of snakes.

In April 2017, the zoo replaced the white tiger with a pair of Asiatic lions. These lions appear to have been one reason why visits to the zoo increased significantly, since the previous year.

=== Future plans ===
This zoo has plans to house hyenas, foxes, barking deer, nilgais, lesser cats, jungle cats, rusty spotted cats, mouse deer and Indian giant squirrels (shekru). An ex situ breeding centre is also planned by the zoo.

=== Gallery ===
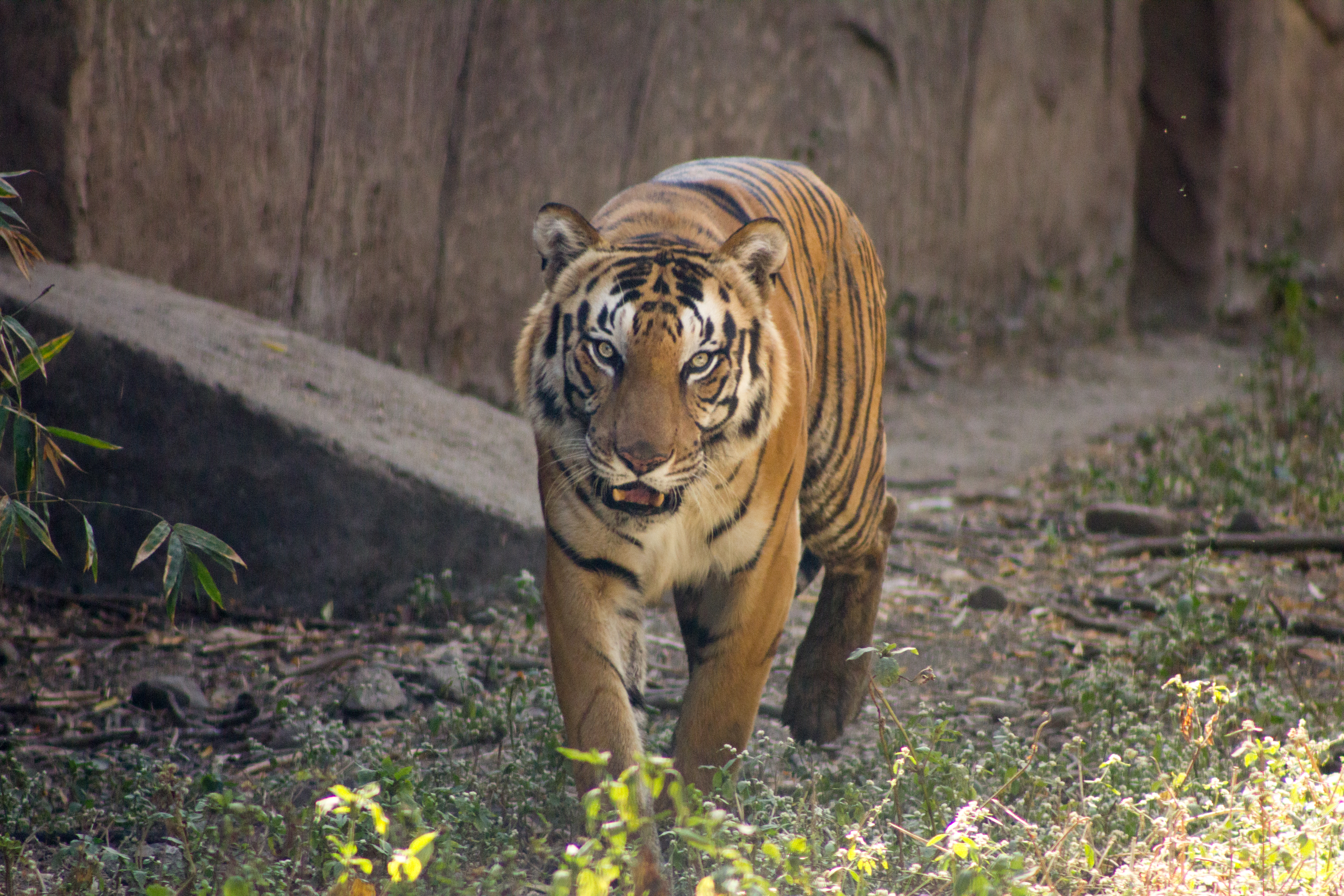
Indian Tiger

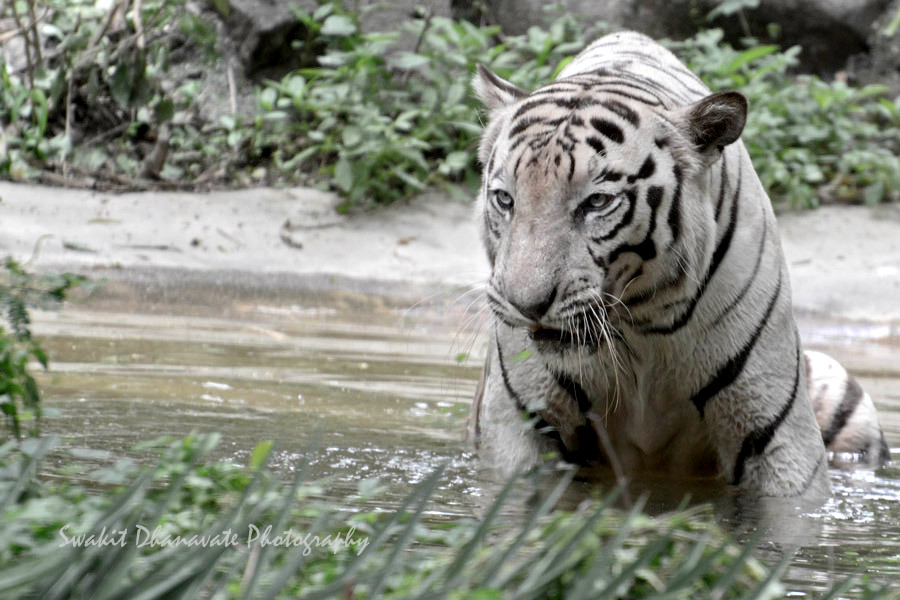
White tiger

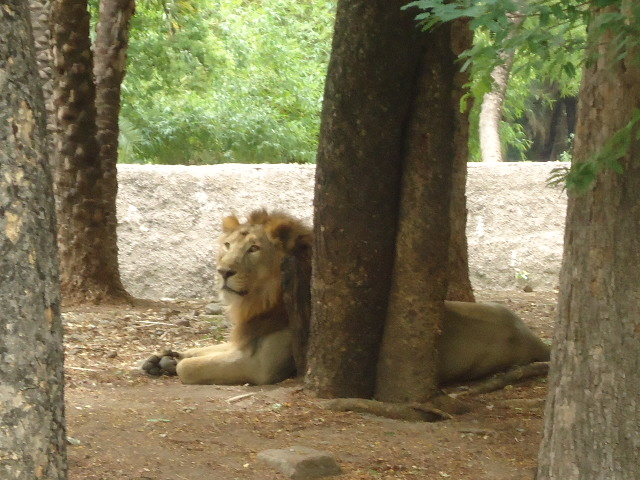
Lion

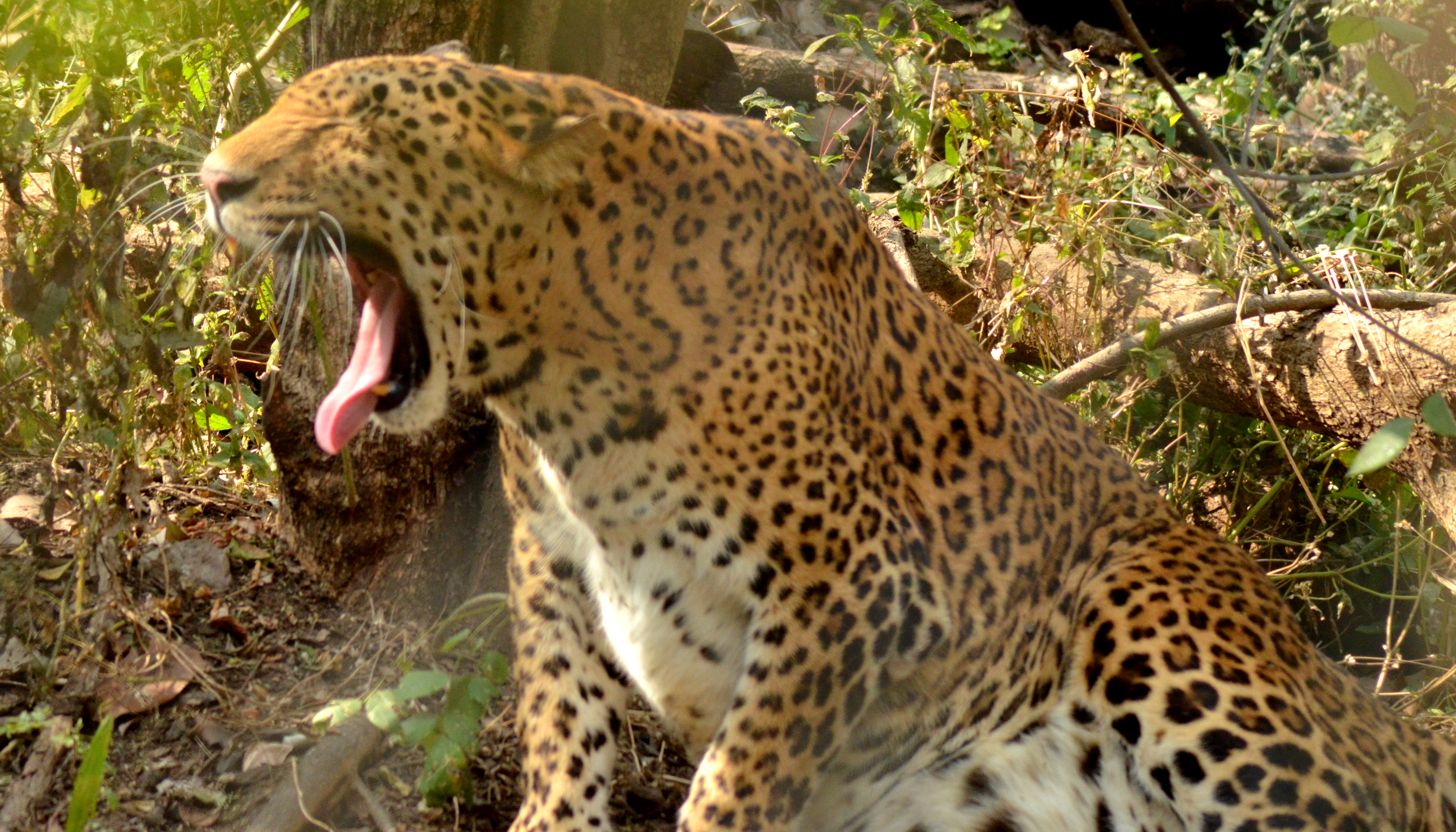
Leopard

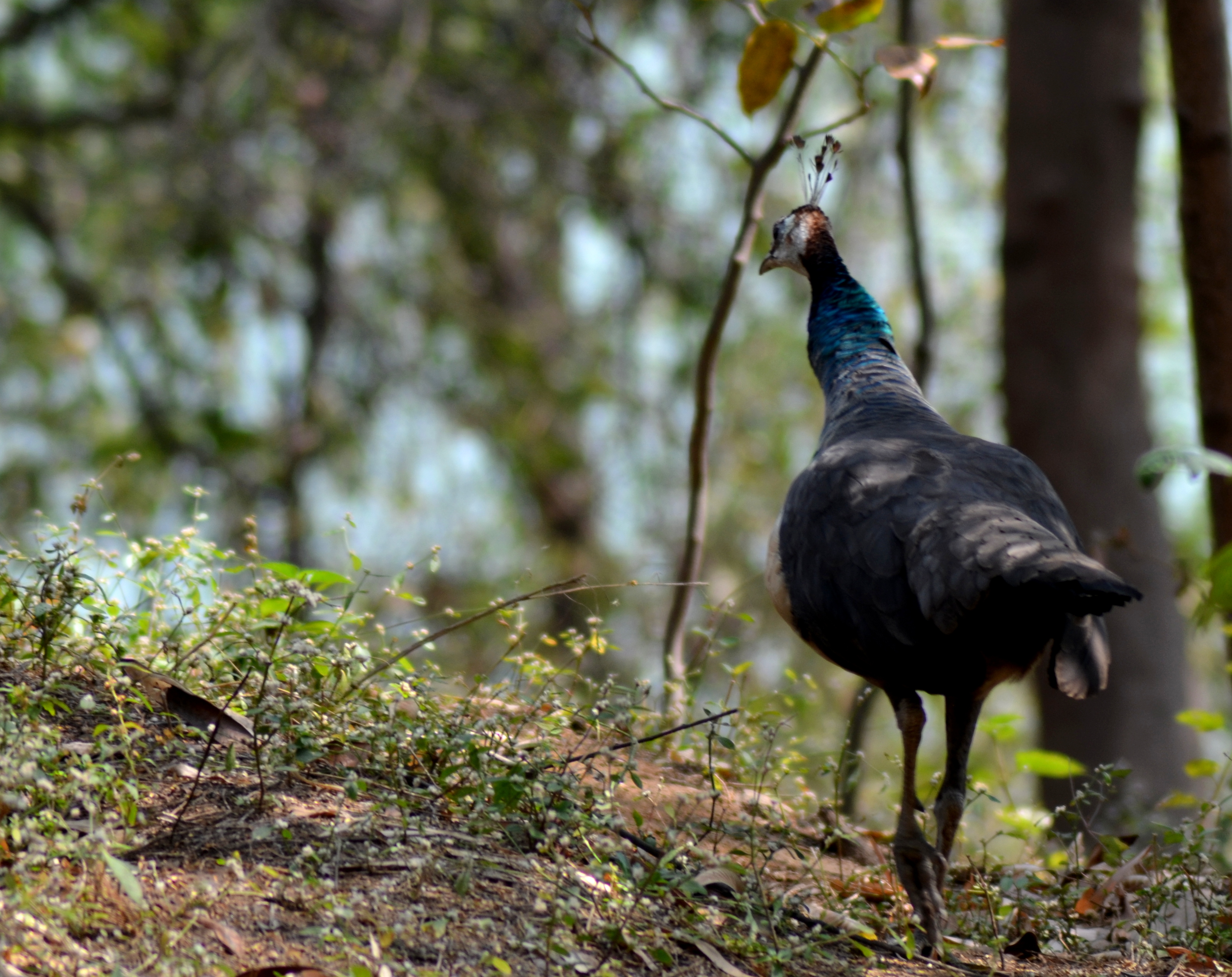
Peacock

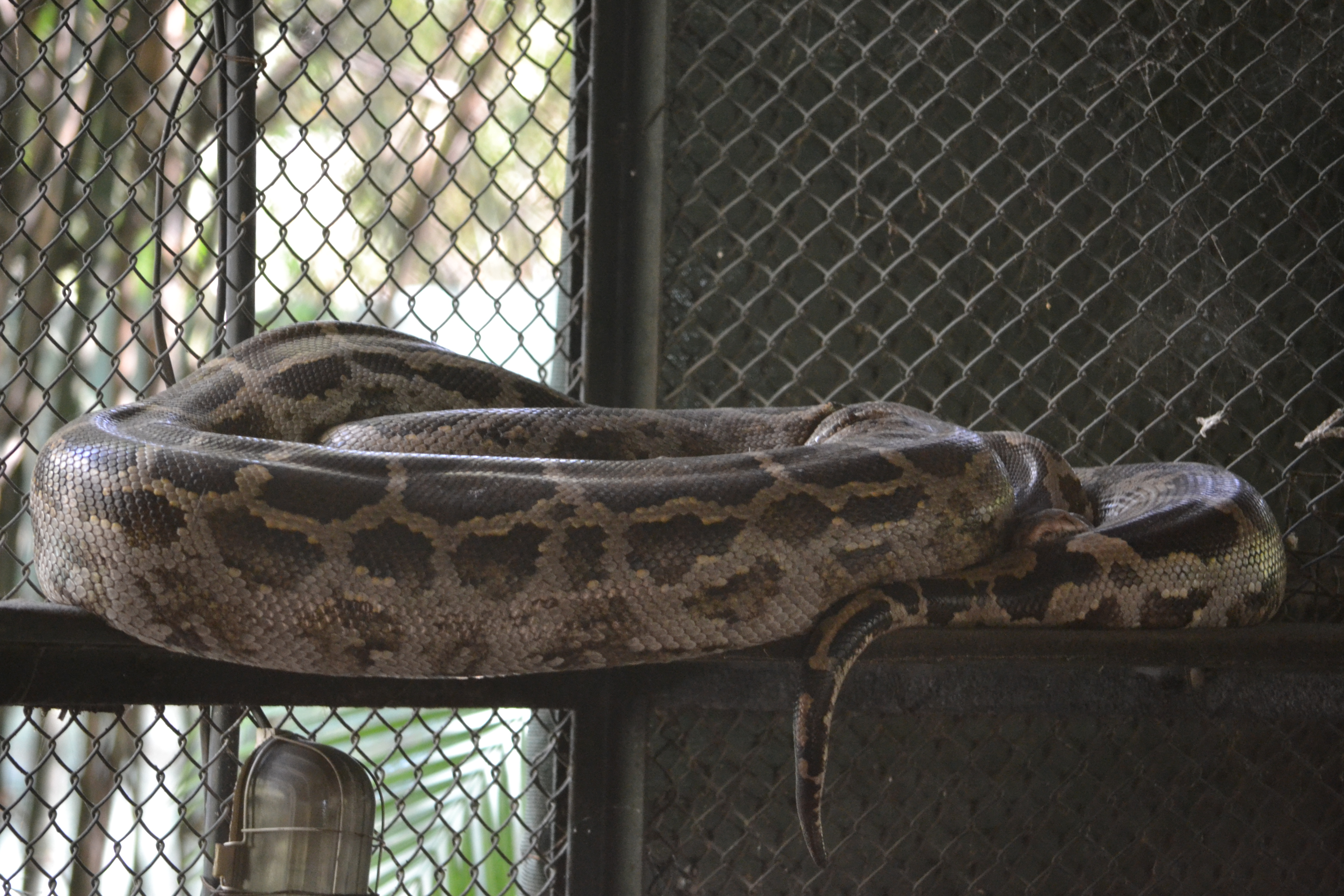
Indian rock python

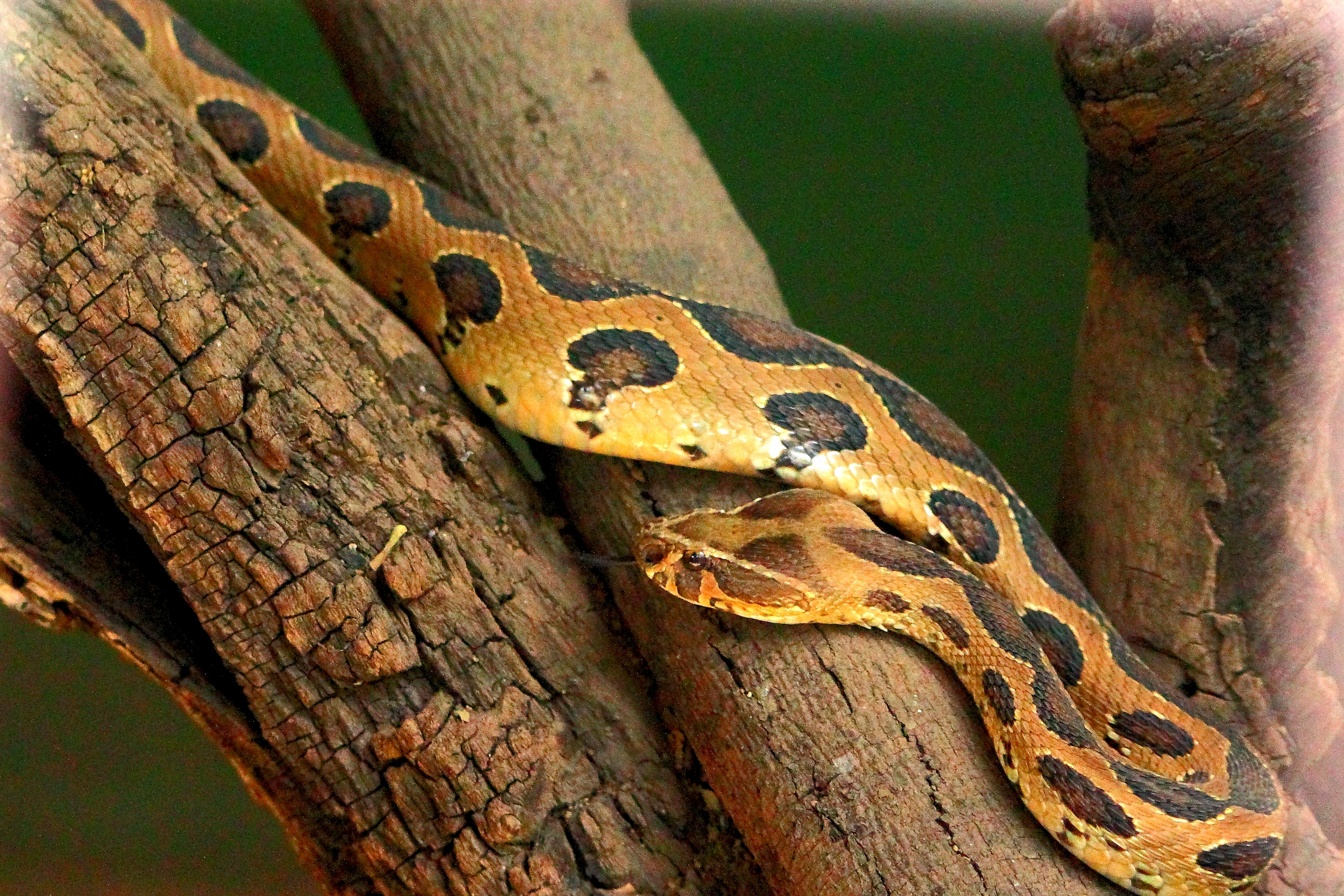
Russell's viper

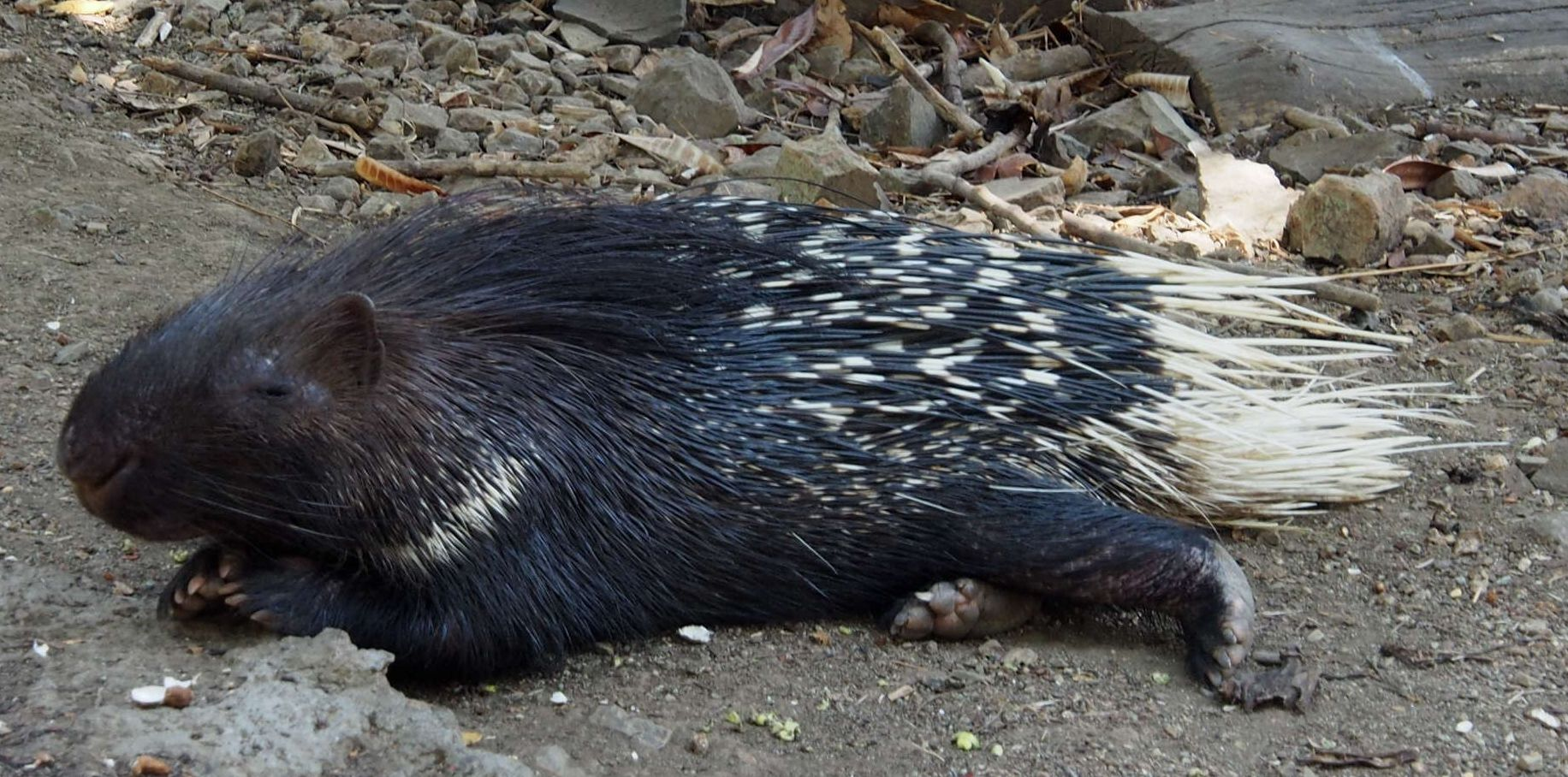
Porcupine

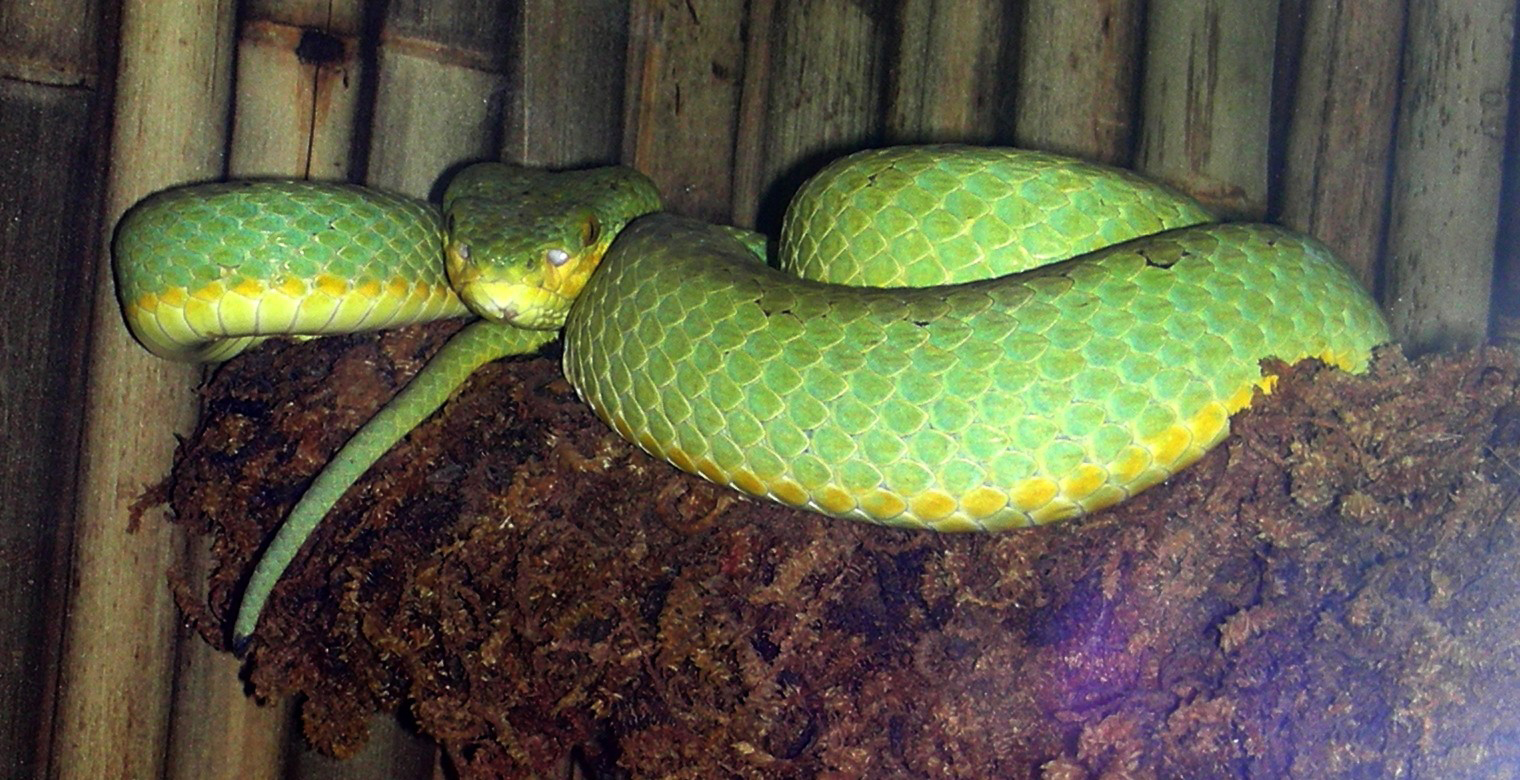
Bamboo viper

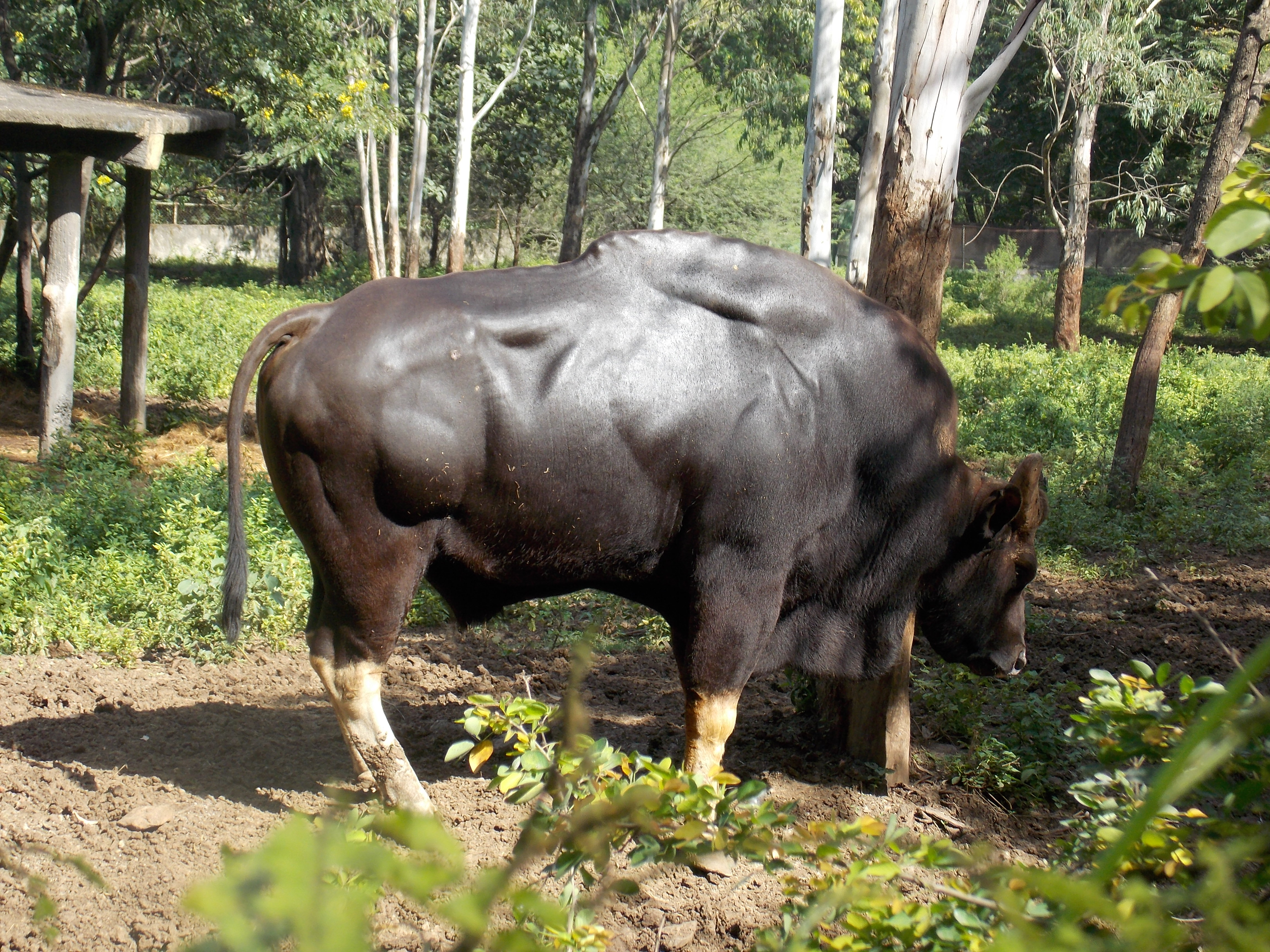
Bull

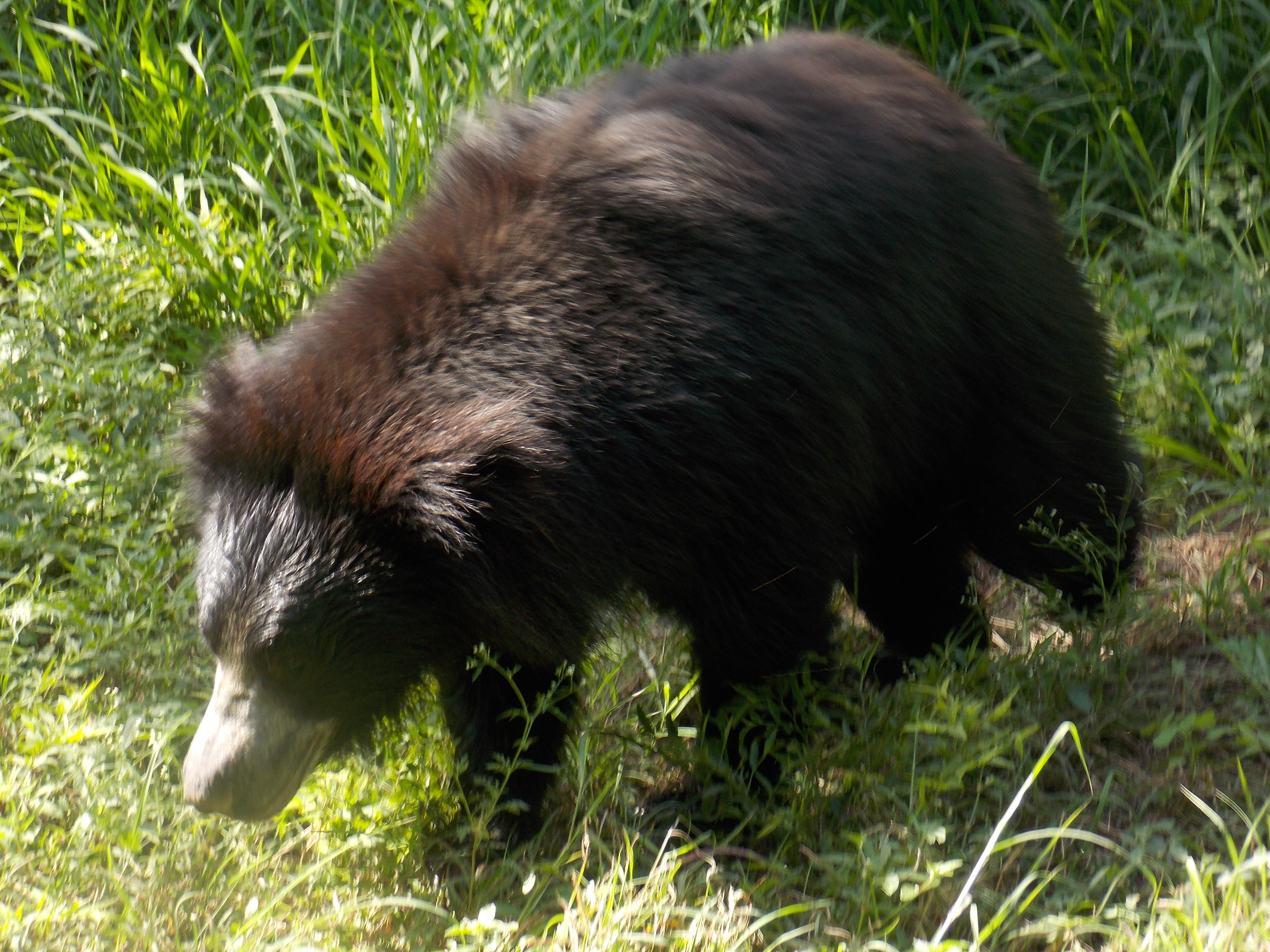
Bear

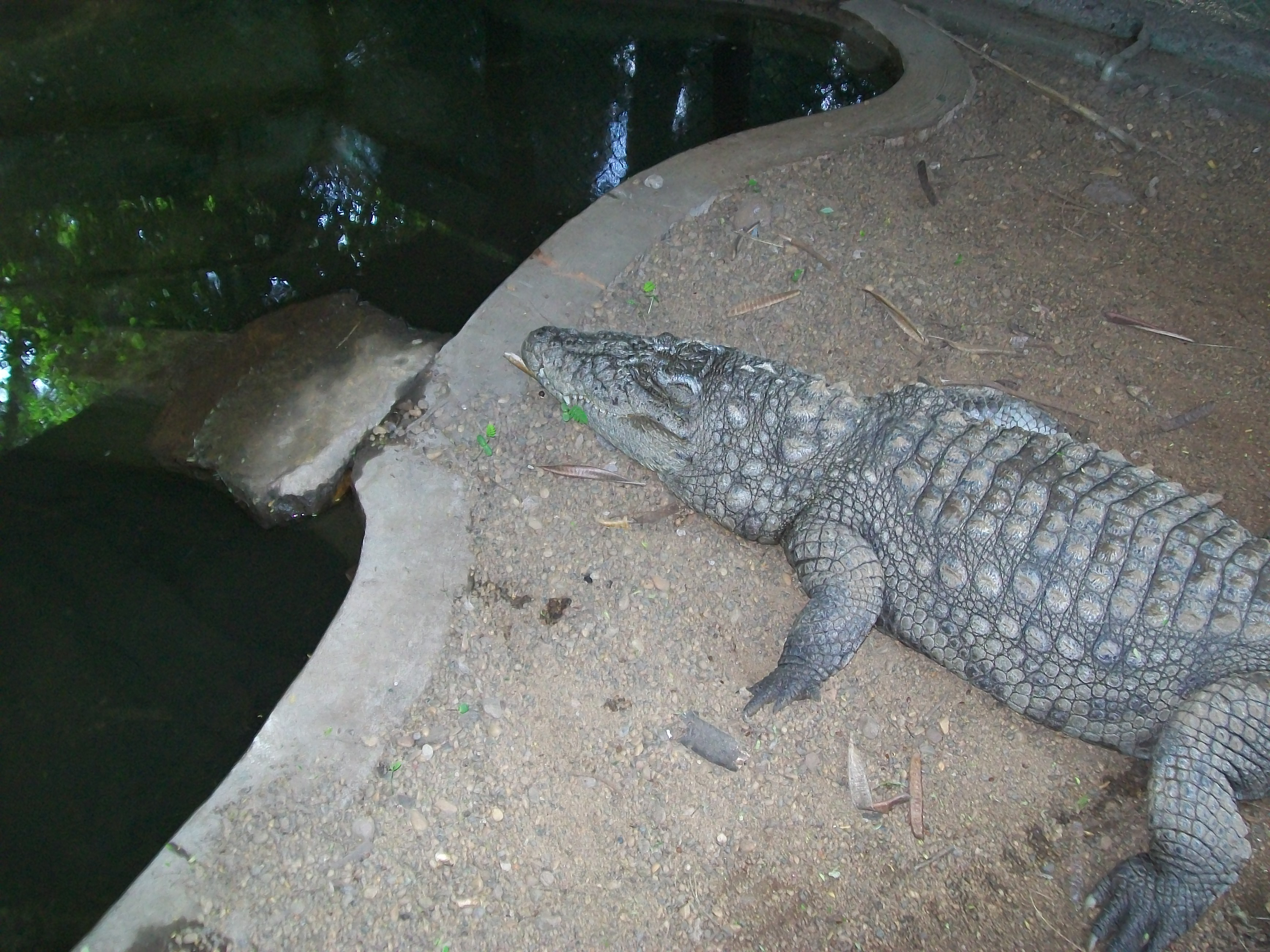
Crocodile

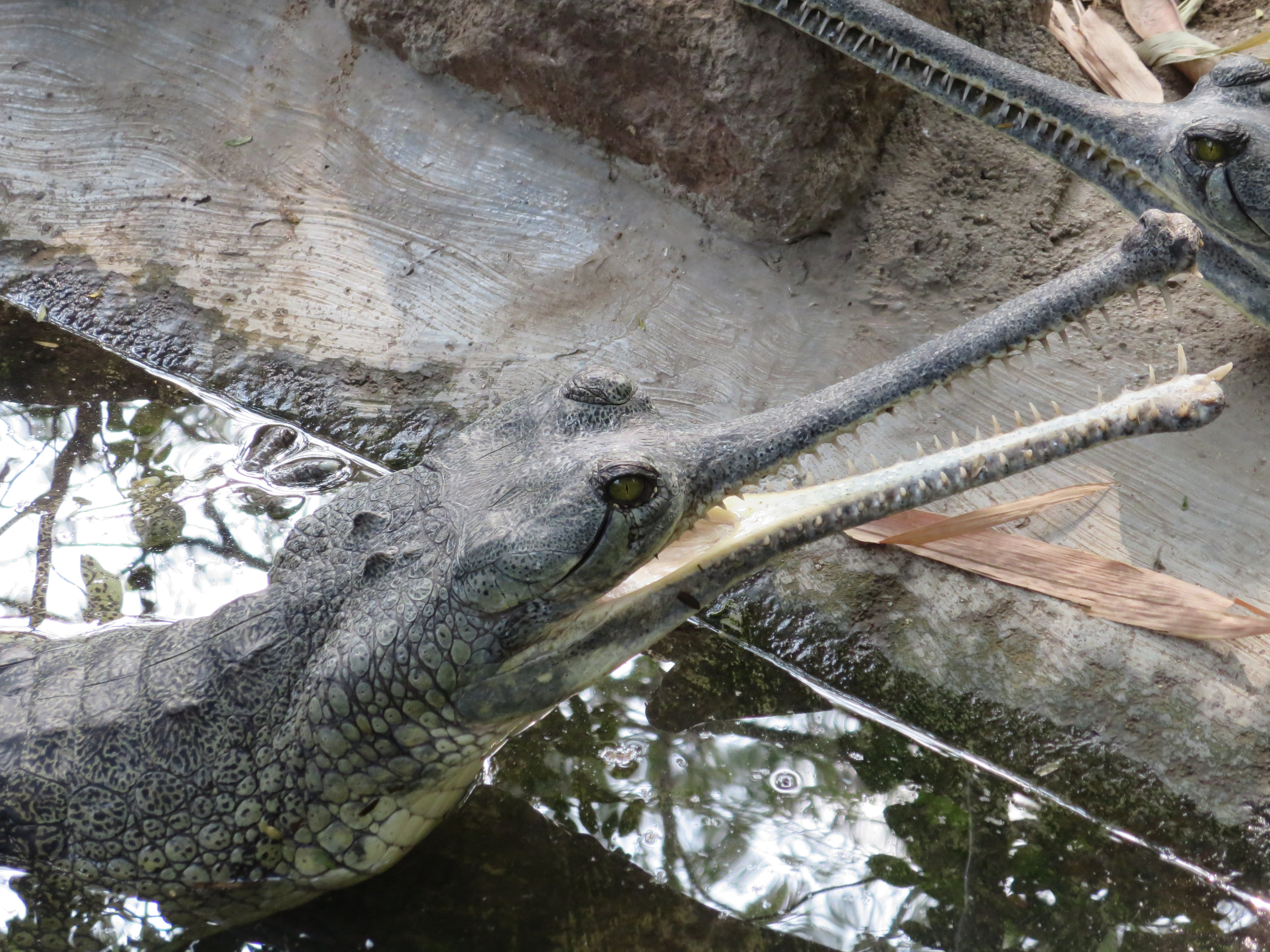
Gharial

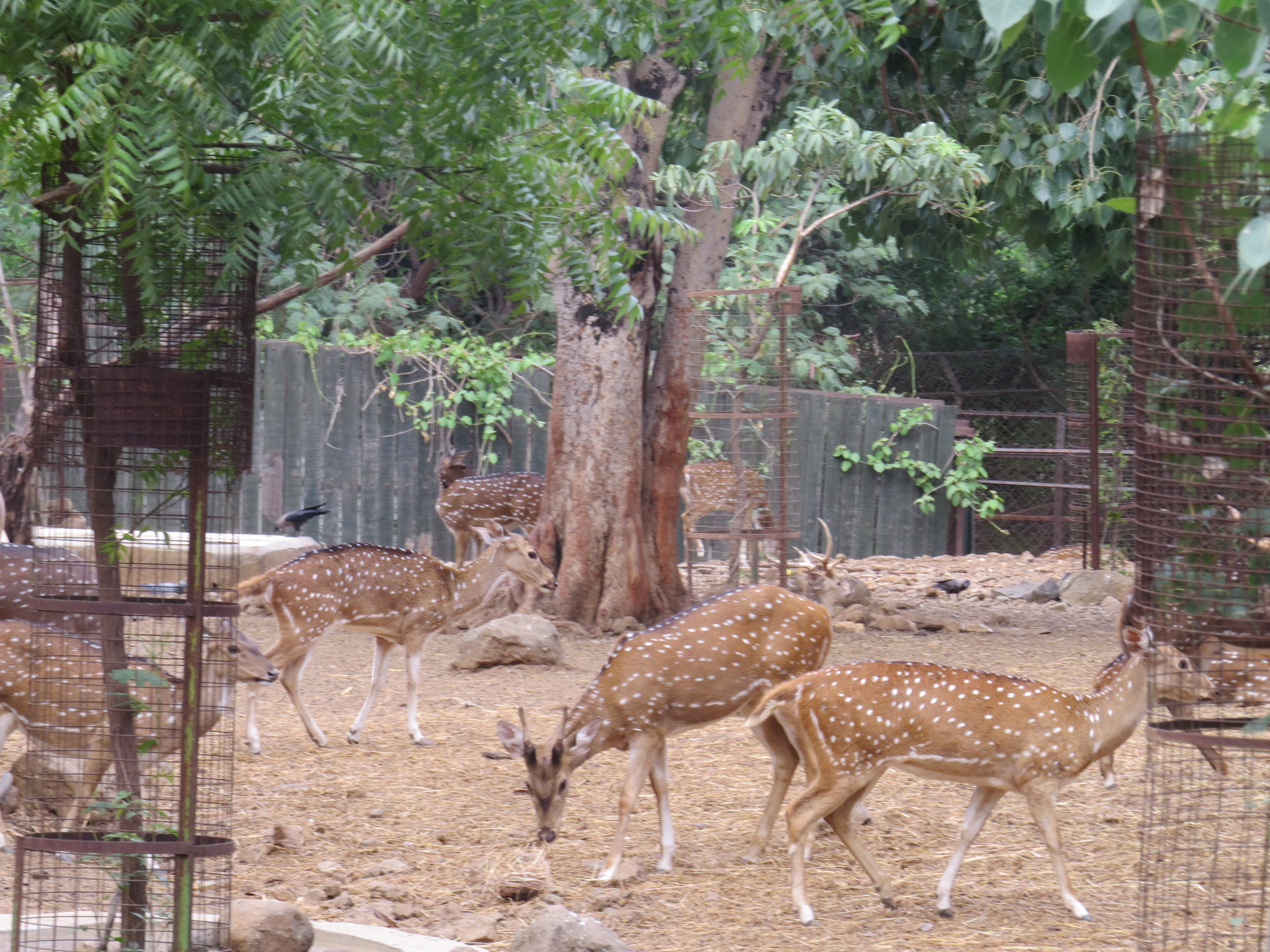
Sika deer

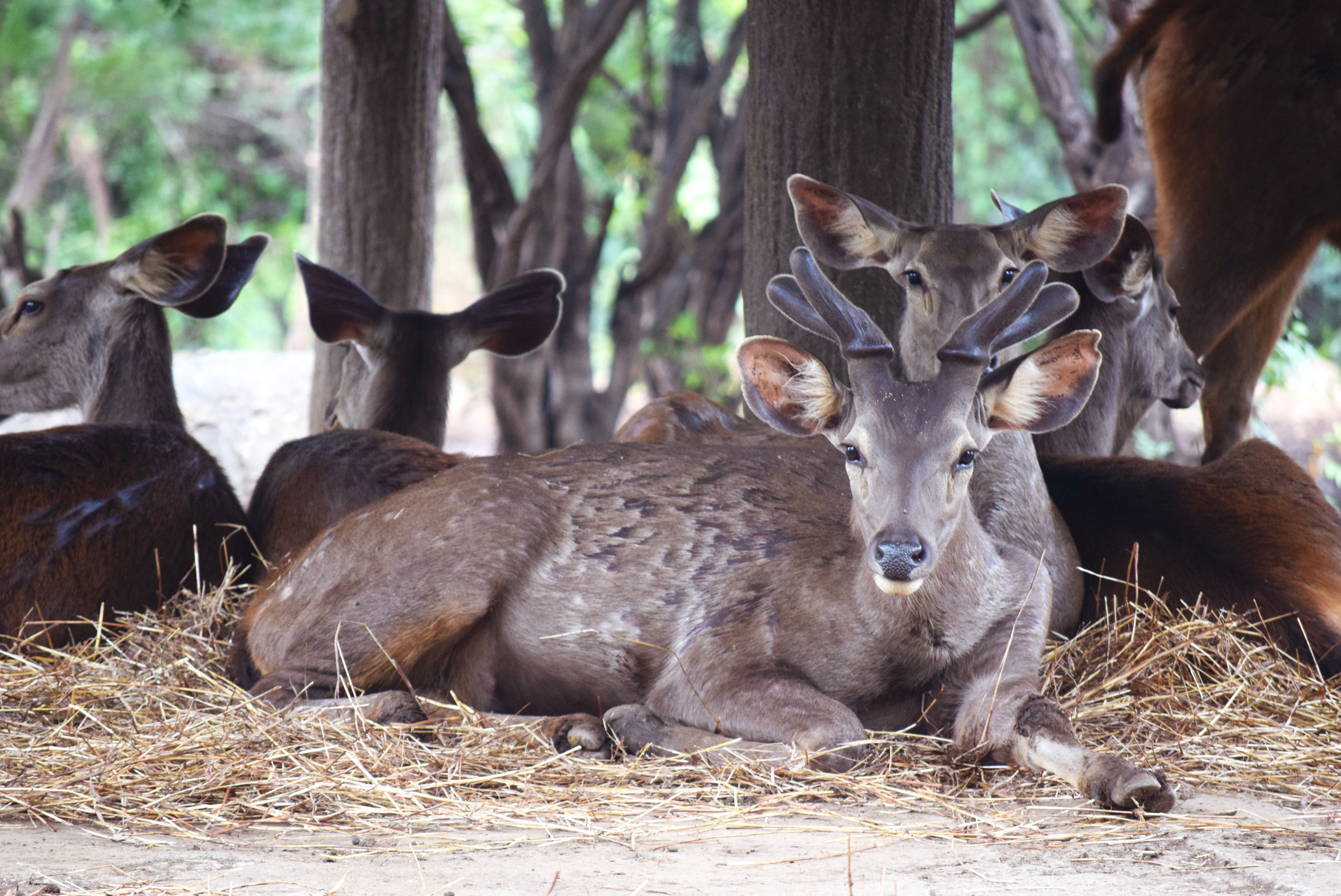
Sambar deer

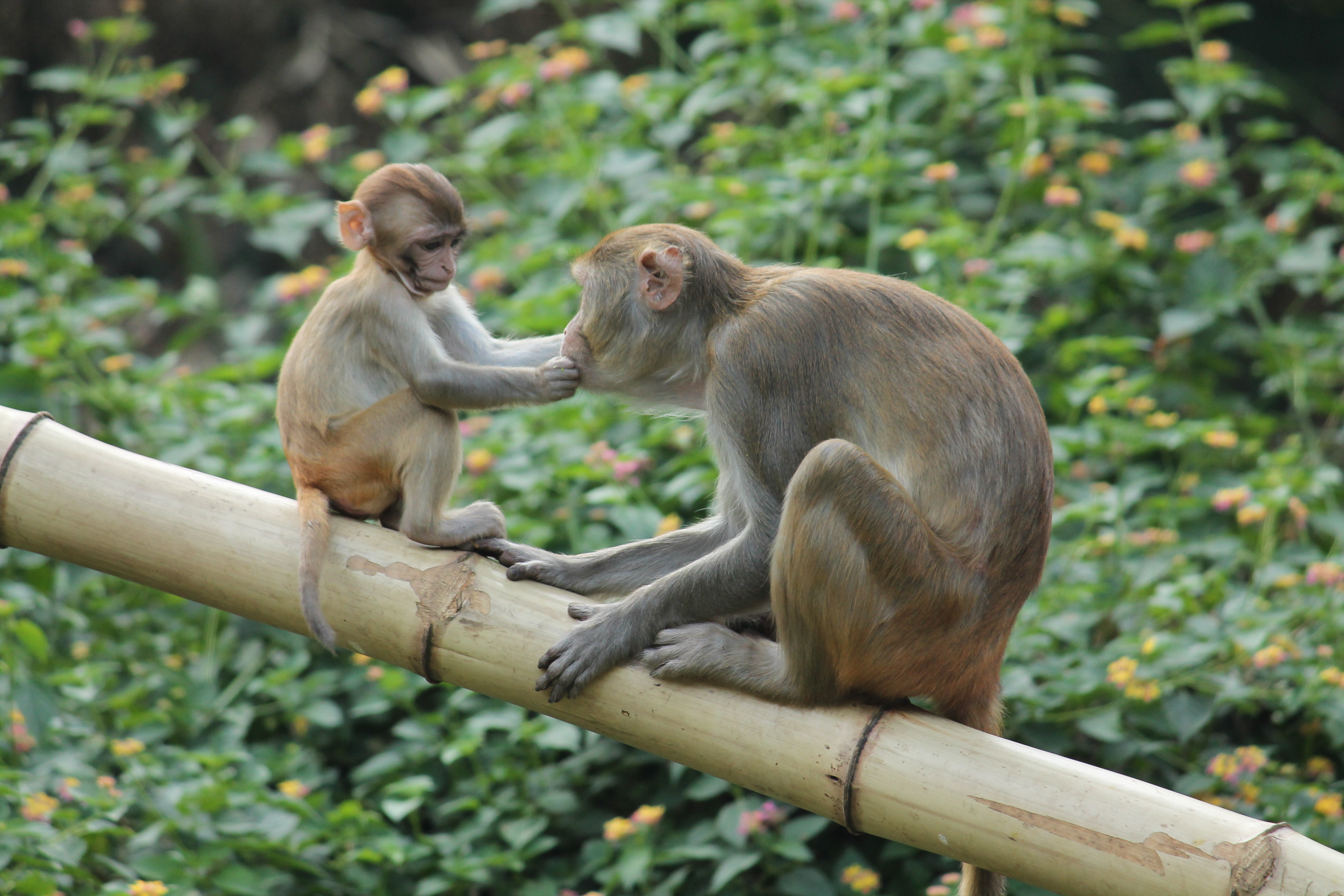
Monkey

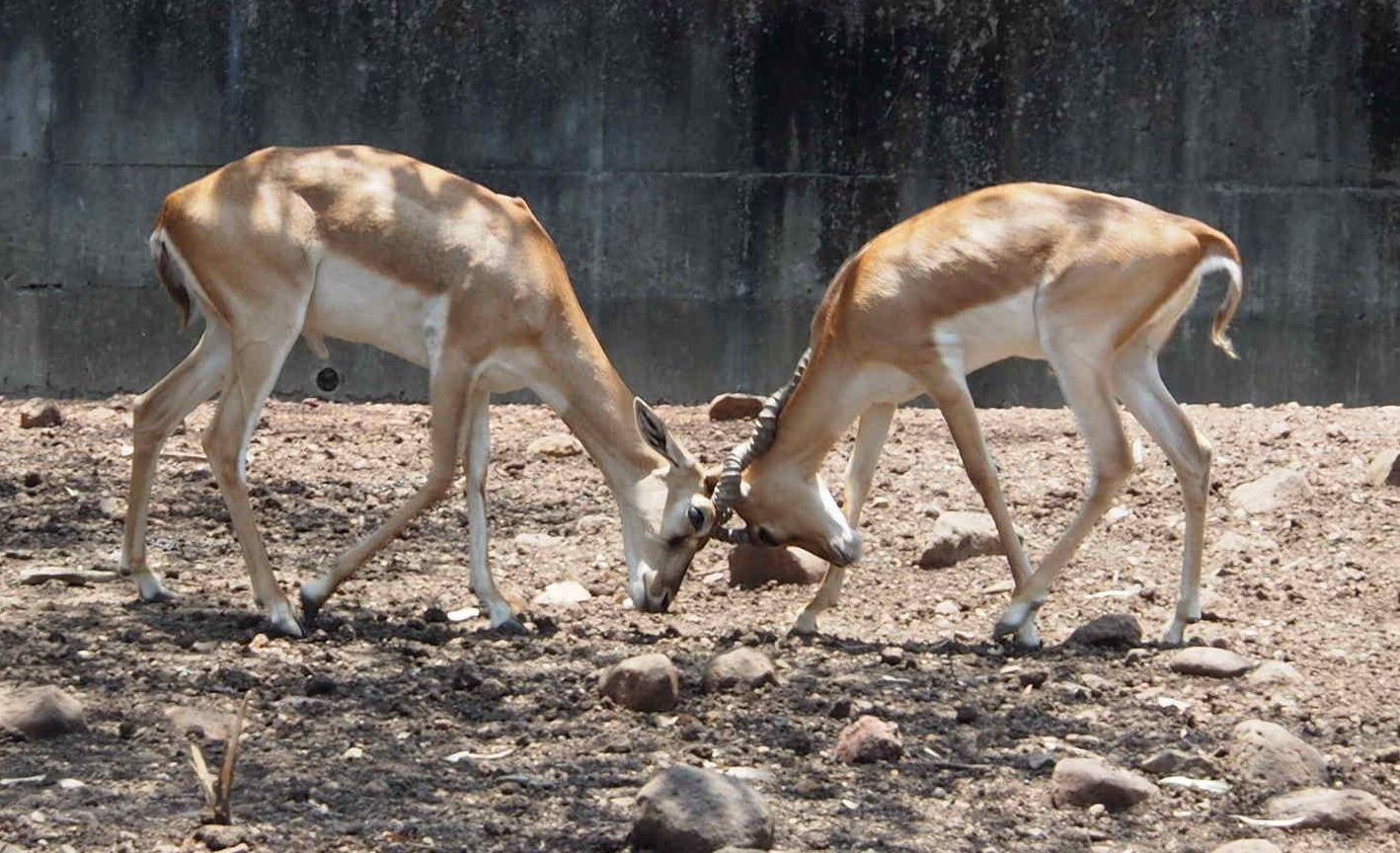
Blackbuck

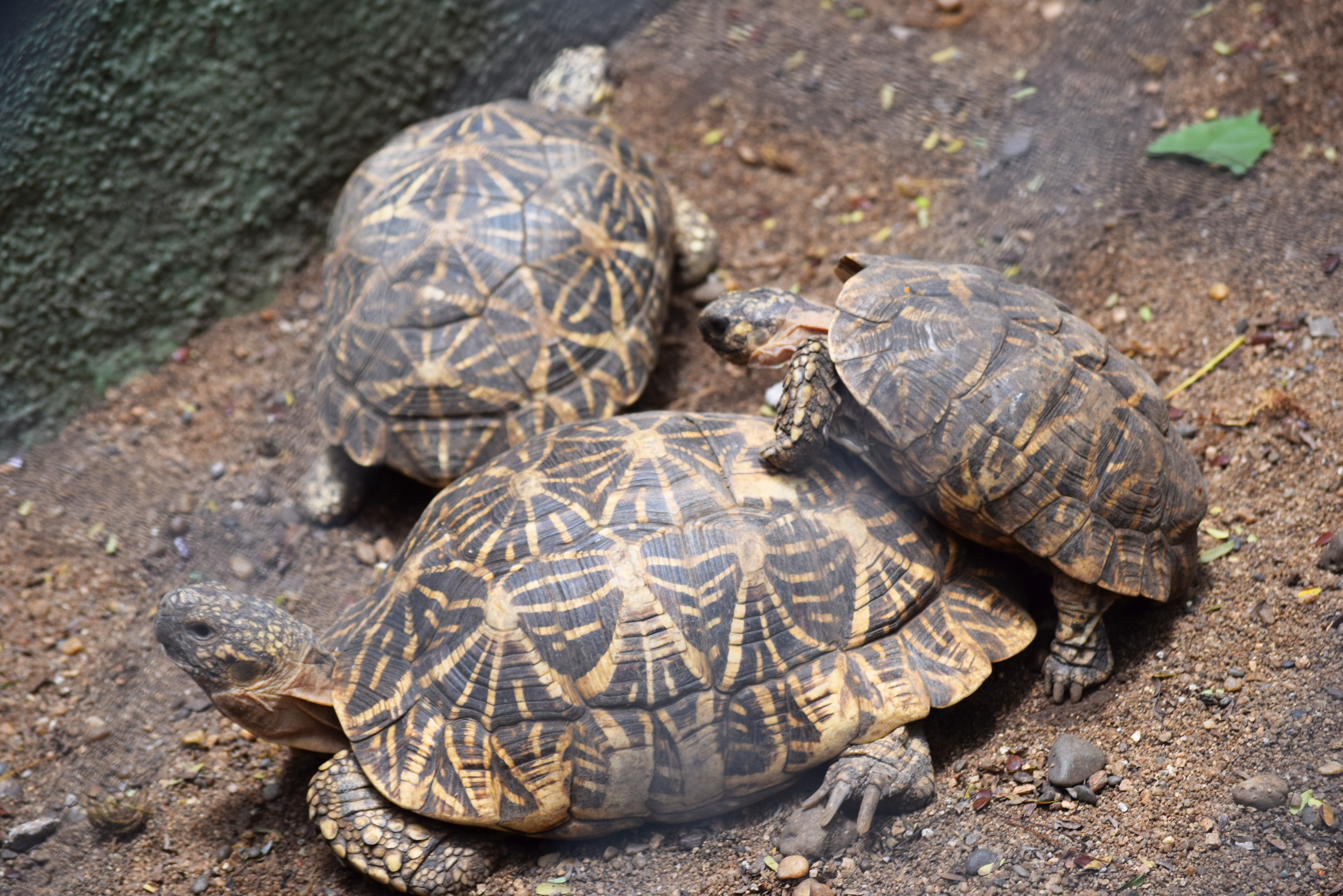
Indian star tortoise

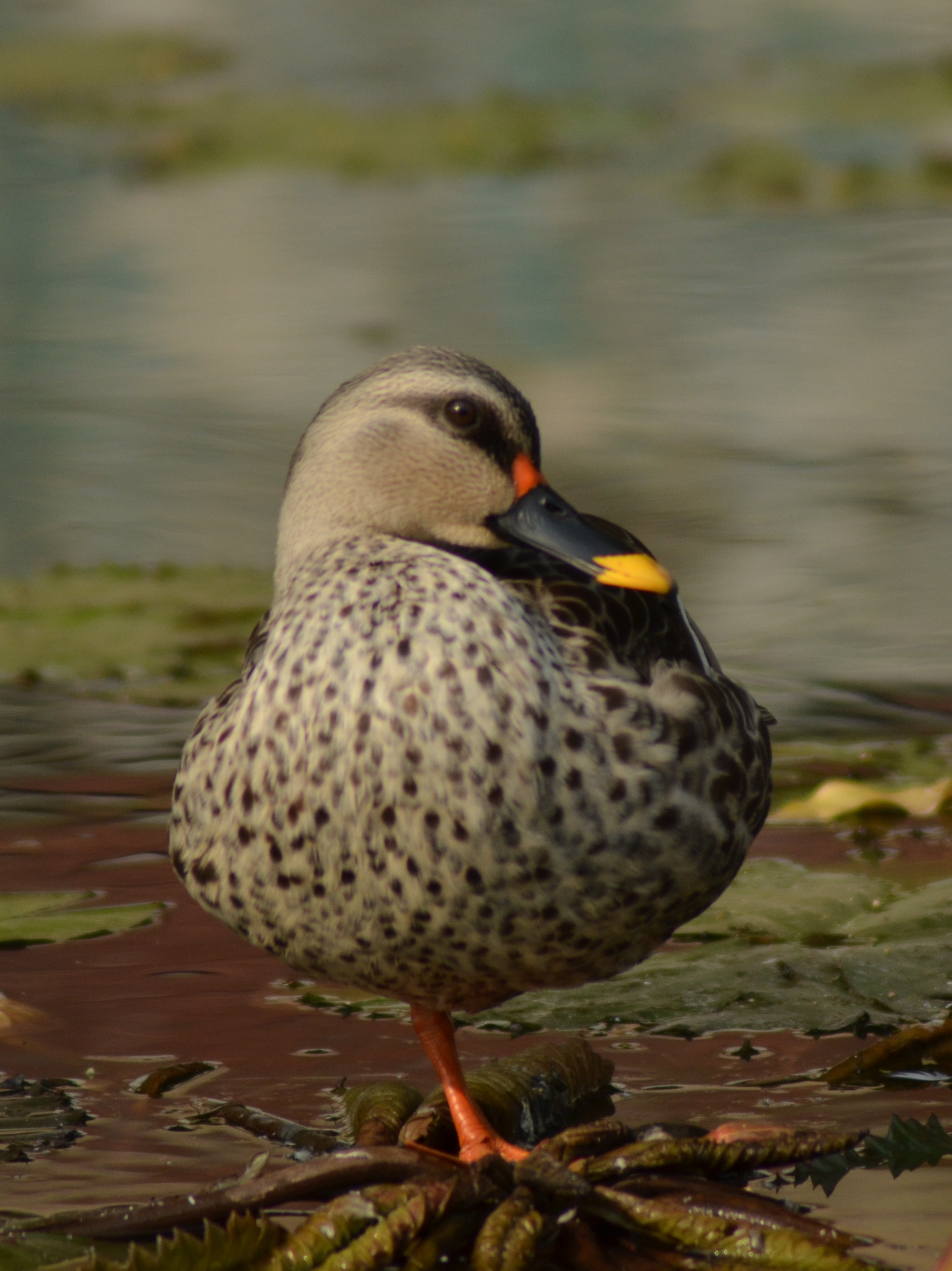
Duck

== Location ==
Slightly outside the city proper, the park is located along the NH-48 on the banks of the Peshwa era Katraj lake, and close to Bharati Vidyapeeth University. The park is 8 km (5.0 miles) from the main city of Pune, close to the Katraj Bus Depot. PMPML buses may be obtained from Swargate. The Katraj dairy and the famous Lake Town Society is also close by.
