= Gayakwadwada =

Historic building in Pune, India

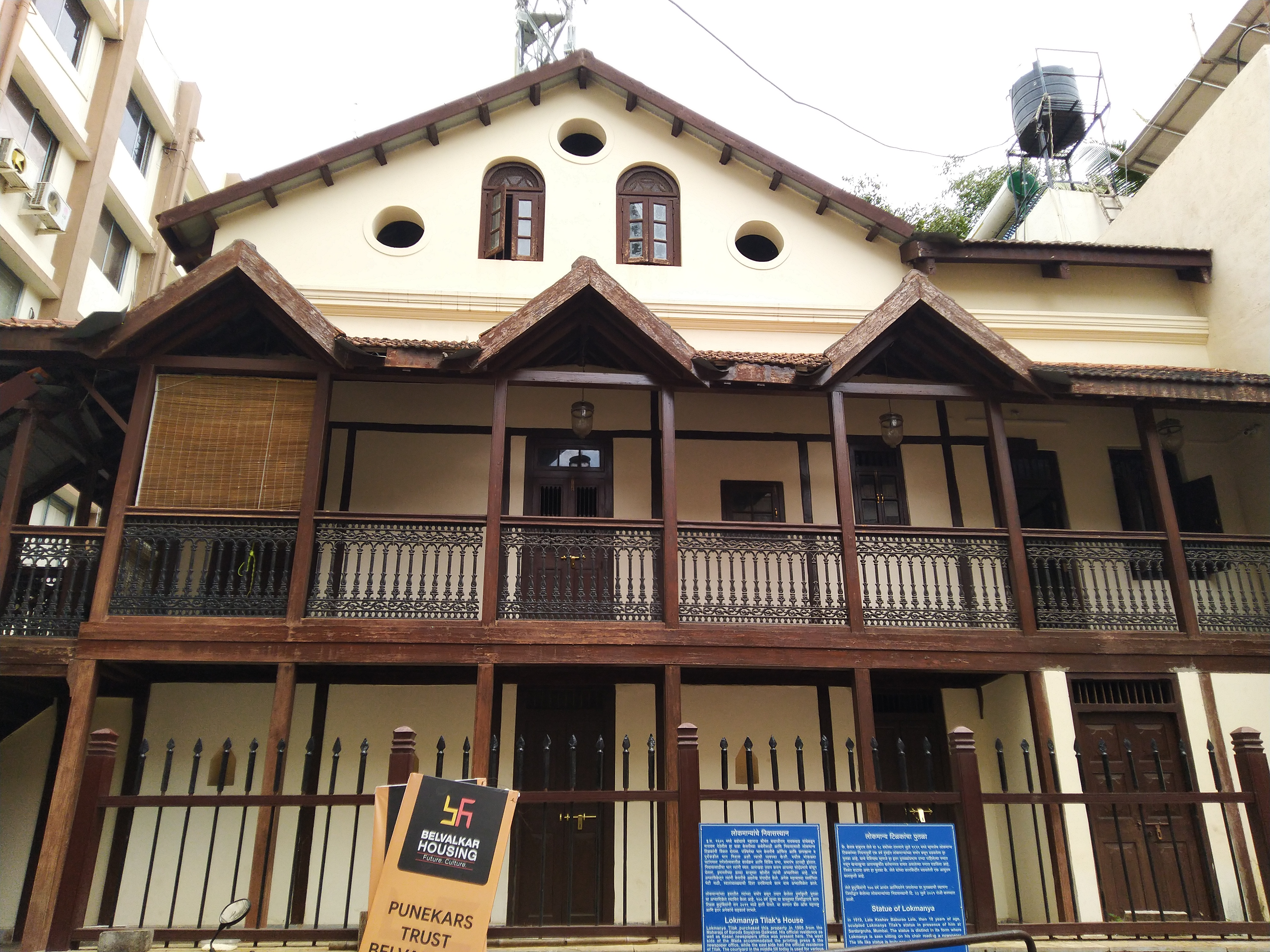

- Location within Maharashtra
- 18.51598895°N 73.8490171°E
- Location: Narayan Peth, Pune, Maharashtra, India

Gayakwadwada is the name of a large edifice in Pune, India which was built by the Sardar Gayakwad family as a residential place for it. Sayajirao Gayakwad, the prince of Baroda state, would occasionally stay there.

Bal Gangadhar Tilak bought the place from Sayajirao in 1905 to serve as an office building for his Kesari and Maratha newspapers. Tilak lived in a part of Gayakwada, and the place was occasionally used by Indian nationalists for their nightlong discussions concerning overthrow of British colonial rule over India. (Tilak had popularized the annual Ganesh Chaturthi festival in Pune and Maharashtra—as the means to generating nationalist spirit among people in Maharashtra—by initiating the festival in the courtyard of Gayakwadwada.)

The edifice currently houses the offices of Kesari and mementos of Tilak, including his writing desk, original letters, and documents; and the first “Flag of Indian Independence” unfurled by Madame Cama.
