= List of national highways in India by state (old numbering) =

This is a list of national highways of India by state, prior to their renumbering in 2010–11. For the list of current highway numbers by state see list of national highways in India by state.

== Andaman and Nicobar Islands ==
S.No.	NH No.	Route	Length (km.)
1	223	The Great Andaman Trunk Road connecting Port Blair - Baratang - Mayabunder	300 km (190 mi)

== Andhra Pradesh ==
S.No.	NH No.	Route	Length in the State
1	4	From Karnataka border to - Palamaner - Chittoor - up to Tamil Nadu Border	83 km (52 mi)
2	5	Baharagora - Cuttack - Bhubaneshwar - Vishakhapatnam - Vijayawada - Guntur - Chennai from Odissha border to Tamil Nadu border	1,000 km (620 mi)
3	7	From Telangana border - Ramachandrapuram - Gooty - Hindupur to Karnataka border	254 km (158 mi)
4	9	From Telangana border - Vijayawada-Machilipatnam	164 km (102 mi)
5	18	Kurnool - Nandyal + Allagadda - Mydukur - Cuddapah - Rayachoti - Pileru- Chittoor	369 km (229 mi)
6	18A	Puthalapattu - Tirupati	50 km (31 mi)
7	43	From Orissa Border - Salur - Ramabhadrapuram - Vizianagaram and terminating at NH 5 near Natavalasa Junction proceeding towards Srikakulam and near Rajapulova Junction proceeding towards Visakhapatnam	83 km (52 mi)
8	63	From Karnataka Border - Guntakal - Gooty	62 km (39 mi)
9	205	Anantapur - Kadiri - Madanapalle - Vayalpadu - Pileru - Tirupati - Renigunta - Puttur - Nagari up to Tamil Nadu Border	360 km (220 mi)
10	214	The highway starting from the junction of NH 5 near Kathipudi - Pithapuram - Kakinada - Yanam - Amalapuram - Razole - Palakollu - Bhimavaram - Mudinepalli-Gudivada -and terminating at NH 9 near Pamarru	270 km (170 mi)
11	214A	The highway starting from the junction of NH 214 near Digamarru connecting Narsapuram - Machilipatnam - Challapalli - Avanigadda - Repalle - Bapatla - Chirala and terminating at NH 5 near Ongole	255 km (158 mi)
12	219	Madanapalle - Punganuru - Palmaner - Kuppam up to Tamil Nadu Border	128 km (80 mi)
13	221	The Highway starting from the junction of NH9 near Ibrahimpatnam connecting Kondapalli - Mylavaram - Cheemalapadu - Tiruvuru - Penuballi - Kothagudem - Paloncha - Bhadrachalam - Nellipaka - Chinturu - Konta up to Telangana border	68 km (42 mi)
13	234	From Karnataka border to - Venkatagirikota - Pernampattu - up to Tamil Nadu Border	23 km (14 mi)
-	-	Total	3,169 km (1,969 mi)

== Arunachal Pradesh ==
S.No.	NH No.	Route	Length
1	52	From Assam Border - Pasighat - Dambuk - Roing - Paya - Tezu - Wakro - Namsai up to Assam Border	310 km (190 mi)
2	52A	From Assam Border - Itanagar up to Assam border	42 km (26 mi)
3	153	From Assam Border + Myanmar border	40 km (25 mi)
4	229	Tawang + Pasighat	1,090 km (680 mi)
-	-	Total	

== Assam ==
S.No.	NH No.	Route	Length (km.)
1	31	From W.B. Border - Gouripur - North Salmara - Bijni - Amingaon, Junction with NH 37	322 km (200 mi)
2	31B	North Salmara - Junction with NH 37 near Jogighopa	19 km (12 mi)
3	31C	From W.B. Border - Kochgaon - Sidli Jn. With NH 31 near Bijni	93 km (58 mi)
4	36	Nagaon - Dabaka - Amlakhi - Nagaland Border	167 km (104 mi)
5	37	Junction with NH 31B near Goalpara - Paikan - Guwahati - Dispur - Nowgaon - Numaligarh - Jorhat - Jhanzi - Dibrugarh - Tinsukia - Makum- Dum Duma - Dholla	680 km (420 mi)
6	37A	Kuwarital – Junction with NH 52 near Tezpur	23 km (14 mi)
7	38	Makum - Ledo - Lekhapani	54 km (34 mi)
8	39	Numaligarh - Naojan - Bokajan up to Nagaland Border	115 km (71 mi)
9	44	From Meghalaya Border - Badarpur - Karimganj - Patharkandi up to Tripura Border	111 km (69 mi)
10	51	Paikan up to Meghalaya Border	22 km (14 mi)
11	52	Baihata - Charali - Mangaldai - Dhekiajuli - Tezpur - Gohpur - Banderdewa - North Lakhimpur - Dhemaji - Kulajan - Arunachal Border - Junction with NH No.37 near Saikhoaghat	540 km (340 mi)
12	52A	Gohpur - A.P. Border - Banderdewa	15 km (9.3 mi)
13	52B	Kulajan - Dibrugarh	31 km (19 mi)
14	53	Junction with NH 44 near Badarpur - Silchar - Lakhipur up to Manipur Border.	100 km (62 mi)
15	54	Dabaka - Lumding - Langting - Hablong - Silchar - Dwarband up to Mizoram Border	338 km (210 mi)
16	61	Jhanzi - Amguri - Nagaland border	20 km (12 mi)
17	62	Dudhnai - Damara up to Meghalaya Border	5 km (3.1 mi)
18	151	Karimganj - Bangladesh Border	14 km (8.7 mi)
19	152	Patacharkuchi - Hajua - Bhutan Border	40 km (25 mi)
20	153	Ledo - Lekhapani - Arunachal Pradesh Border	20 km (12 mi)
21	154	Dhaleshwar (Hailakandi) - Bairabi - Mizoram Border	110 km (68 mi)
-	-	Total	2,836 km (1,762 mi)

== Bihar ==
NH	Route inside Bihar	Complete Route	Length in State (km)	Total Length
2	Uttar Pradesh border – Mohania – Kudra – Sasaram – Dehri – Aurangabad – Madanpur – Dobhi – Barachati – Jharkhand border	Delhi – Mathura – Agra – Kanpur – Allahabad – Varanasi – Mohania – Barhi – Palsit – Baidyabati – Calcutta	Delhi (12), Haryana (74), Uttar Pradesh (752), Bihar (202), Jharkhand (190), West Bengal (235)	1465
19	Uttar Pradesh border – Manjhi – Chhapra – Sonpur – Hajipur – Patna	Ghazipur – Balia – Manjhi – Chhapra – Sonpur – Hajipur – Patna	Bihar (120), Uttar Pradesh (120)	240
28	Junction with NH 31 – Barauni – Bachwara – Tajpur – Muzaffarpur – Mehsi – Chakia – Gopalganj – Uttar Pradesh border	Junction with NH 31 – Barauni – Muzaffarpur – Pipra – Kothi – Gorakhpur – Lucknow	Bihar (259), Uttar Pradesh (311)	570
28A	Junction with NH 28 – Pipra – Kothi – Sagauli – Raxaul – Indo-Nepal Border	Junction with NH 28 – Pipra – Kothi – Sagauli – Raxauli – Indo-Nepal border	Bihar (68)	68
28B	Chapra – Bettiah – Lauriya – Bagaha – Chhitauni – Uttar Pradesh Border	Chapra – Bettiah – Lauriya – Bagaha – Chhitauni – Uttar Pradesh border	Bihar (121)	121
30	Junction with 2 – Mohania – Kochas – Dinara – Bikramganj – Arrah – Danapur – Patna – Fatuha – Bakhtiarpur	Junction with NH 2 – Mohania – Arrah – Patna – Bakhtiarpur	Bihar (230)	230
30A	Fatuha – Chandi – Harnaut – Barh	Fatuha – Chandi – Harnaut – Barh	Bihar (65)	65
31	Jharkhand border – Rajauli – Nawada – Bihar Sharif – Bakhtiarpur – Barh – Mokameh – Barauni – Begusarai – Balia – Khagaria – Bihpur – Kursela – Purnia – Baisi – West Bengal – Kishanganj – West Bengal border	Junction with NH 2 – Barhi – Bakhtiarpur – Mokameh – Purnea – Dalkola – Siliguri – Sevok – Cooch Behar – North Salmara – Nalbari – Charali – Amingaon Junction with NH 37	Bihar (393), West Bengal (366), Assam (322), Jharkhand (44)	1125
57	Muzaffarpur – Darbhanga – Jhanjharpur – Narahia – Narpatganj – Forbesganj – Araria – Purnia	Muzaffarpur – Darbhanga – Jhanjharpur – Narahia – Narpatganj – Forbesganj – Araria – Purnia	Bihar (310)	310
57A	Junction with 57 – Forbesganj – Jogbani	Junction with NH 57 – Forbesganj – Jogbani	Bihar (15)	15
77	Hajipur – Muzaffarpur – Sitamarhi – Sonbarsa	Hajipur – Muzaffarpur – Sitamarhi – Sonbarsa	Bihar (142)	142
80	Mokamah – Luckeesarai – Munger – Bhagalpur – Kahalgaon – Jharkhand border	Mokamah – Luckeesarai – Munger – Bhagalpur – Kahalgaon – Rajmahal – Farrakka	Bihar (200), Jharkhand (100), West Bengal (10)	310
81	Kora – Katihar – Malda – West Bengal border	Kora – Katihar – Malda – West Bengal Border	Bihar (45), West Bengal (55)	100
82	Gaya – Hisua — Rajgir – Bar Bigha – Bihar Sharif – Mokameh	Gaya – Hisua — Rajgir – Bar Bigha- Bihar Sharif – Mokameh	Bihar (130)	130
83	Patna – Jehanabad – Bela – Gaya – Bodhgaya – Dobhi	Patna – Jehanabad – Bela – Gaya – Bodhgaya – Dobhi	Bihar (130)	130
84	Arrah – Buxar	Arrah – Buxar	Bihar (60)	60
85	Chhapra – Ekma – Siwan – Gopalganj	Chhapra – Ekma – Siwan – Gopalganj	Bihar (95)	95
98	Patna – Arwal – Daudnagar – Aurangabad – Rajhara – Amba – Jharkhand border	Patna – Arwal – Daudnagar – Aurangabad – Rajhara – Amba – Jharkhand border	Bihar (156), Jharkhand (51)	207
101	Chhapra – Baniapur – Mohammadpur	Chhapra – Baniapur – Mohamadpur	Bihar (60)	60
102	Chhapra – Rewaghat – Muzaffarpur	Chhapra – Rewaghat – Muzaffarpur	Bihar (80)	80
103	Hajipur – Hazrat Jandaha – Mushrigharari	Hajipur – Hazrat Jandaha – Mushrigharari	Bihar (55)	55
104	Chakia – Madhubani – Jainagar – Shivhar – Sitamarhi – Sursand – Jainagar – Narahia	Chakia – Madhubani – Jainagar – Shivhar – Sitamarhi – Sursand – Jainagar – Narahia	Bihar (160)	160
105	Darbhanga – Aunsi – Jainagar	Darbhanga – Aunsi – Jainagar	Bihar (66)	66
106	Birpur – Pipra – Madhepura – Kishanganj – Bihpur	Birpur – Pipra – Madhepura – Kishanganj – Bihpur	Bihar (130)	130
107	Maheshkhunt – Sonbarsa Raj – Simri Bakhtiyarpur – Bariahi – Saharsa –Madhepura – Banmankhi – Purnia	Maheshkhunt – Sonbarsa Raj – Simri Bakhtiarur – Bariahi – Saharsa – Madhepura – Banmankhi – Purnia	Bihar (145)	145
110	Junction with NH 98 – Arwal – Jehanabad – Bandhuganj – Kako – Ekangarsarai – Bihar Sharif – Junction with	Junction with NH 98 – Arwal – Jehanabad – Bandhuganj – Kako – Ekangarsarai – Biharsharif – Junction with NH 31	Bihar (89)	89

== Chandigarh ==
S.No.	NH No.	Route	Length (km.)
1	21	Starting from Punjab Mohali phase 6 – Chandigarh up to Zirakpur punjab Border (mohali District)	24 km (15 mi)

== Chhattisgarh ==
S.No.	NH No.	Route	Length (km.)
1	53	From Maharashtra Border - Baghnadi - Chichola - Rajnandgaon - Durg - Bhilai - Raipur - Arang - Pithora - Basna - Saraipali - up to Orissa Border	314 km (195 mi)
2	12A	From M.P. Border - Chilpi - Kawardha - Pipariya - Bemetara - Simga	128 km (80 mi)
3	16	From Maharashtra Border - Bhopalpatnam - Bijapur - Bhairamgarh - Gidam - Jagdalpur	210 km (130 mi)
4	30	Raipur - Deori - Dhamtari - Charama - Kanker - Keskal - Pharasgaon - Kondagaon - Jagdalpur up to Orissa Border	316 km (196 mi)
5	43	From M.P. Border - Mahendragarh - Baikunthpur - Surajpur - Ambikapur - Kunkuri - Pathalgaon - Raikera - Jashpurnagar - Rupsera - Jharkhand Border	356 km (221 mi)
6	111	Bilaspur - Ratanpur - Katghore - Kendai - Surajpur	200 km (120 mi)
7	200	Raipur - Simga - Baitalpur - Bilaspur - Ramgarh - Champa - Sakti - Uravmiti - Raigarh up to Orissa Border	300 km (190 mi)
8	202	Bhopalpatnam - Bhadrakali - Kotturu up to A.P. Border	36 km (22 mi)
9	216	Raigarh - Sarangarh - Saraipali	80 km (50 mi)
10	217	Raipur - Mahasamund - Suarmar-Kunkuri-Jashpur up to Orissa Border	70 km (43 mi)
11	221	From A.P. Border Konta - Sukma - Kukanar - Darba - Sosanpal - Terminating junction with NH16 near Jagadalpur	280 km (170 mi)
-	-	Total	2,290 km (1,420 mi)

== Delhi ==
S.No.	NH No.	Route	Length (km.)
1	1	Outer Ring Road/ Transport Nagar - Haryana Border	22 km (14 mi)
2	2	NH2/Ring Road - Delhi Capital - Haryana Border	12 km (7.5 mi)
3	2	From Delhi to Faridabad	4.4 km (2.7 mi)
4	8	Ring Road –Haryana Border	13 km (8.1 mi)
5	10	Outer Ring Road - Mundka - Haryana Border	18 km (11 mi)
6	24	Nizamuddin Road - U.P.border.	7 km (4.3 mi)
-	-	Total	76.4 km (47.5 mi)

== Goa ==
S.No.	NH No.	Route	Length (km.)
1	4A	From Karnataka Border - Darbandora - Ponda - Bhoma - Banastari - Panaji	171 km (106 mi)
2	17	From Maharashtra Border - Pernem - Mapuca - Panaji - Cortalim - Verna - Margao - Cuncolim - Chauri (Chauri) - Polem up to Karnataka Border	139 km (86 mi)
3	17A	Cortalim (Kortali) - Sancoale - Chicalim - Murmugao	19 km (12 mi)
4	17B	Ponda - Verna - Vasco da Gama	40 km (25 mi)
-	-	Total	369 km (229 mi)

== Gujarat ==
S.No.	NH No.	Route	Length (km.)
1	NE-1	Ahmedabad - Vadodara Expressway	93 km (58 mi)
2	6	Hajira - Surat - Bardoli - Vyara - Songadh up to Maharashtra Border	177 km (110 mi)
3	8	From Rajasthan Border - Himatnagar - Ahmadabad - Anand - Vadodara - Karjan -Bharuch - Ankleshwar - Chalthan (Surat) - Navsari - Valsad - Vapi - Maharashtra Border	498 km (309 mi)
4	8A	Ahmedabad - Bagodra - Limbdi - Bamanbore - Morbi - Samakhiali - Kandla – Mandvi - Vikhadi - Kothara - Naliya up to Narayan Sarovar	618 km (384 mi)
5	8B	Jamnagar - Rajkot - Gondal - Jetpur - Dhoraji - Kutiyana - Porbandar	206 km (128 mi)
6	8C	Chiloda - Gandhinagar - Sarkhej	46 km (29 mi)
7	8D	Jetpur - Junagadh - Keshod - Somnath	127 km (79 mi)
8	8E	Dwarka - Porbandar - Navibabder - Somnath - Kodinar - Una - Mahuva - Talaja - Bhavnagar	445 km (277 mi)
9	14	From Rajasthan Border - Palanpur - Deesa - Sihori - Radhanpur	140 km (87 mi)
10	15	Samakhiali - Santalpur - Radhanpur - Bhaghar - Tharad up to Rajasthan Border	270 km (170 mi)
11	59	Ahmedabad - Kathua - Godhra - Dahod up to M.P. Border	211 km (131 mi)
12	113	Dahod - Limdi - Zalod - Rajasthan Border.	40 km (25 mi)
13	228	Dandi heritage route Sabarmati Ashram - Aslali - Navagam - Matar - - Anand - Borsad - Kankapura - Kareli - Ankhi - Amod - Derol - Ankleshwar - Mangrol - Umrachi - Bhatgam - Delad - Surat - Vanjh - Navsari - Kardi - Dandi	374 km (232 mi)
-	-	Total	3,245 km (2,016 mi)

== Haryana ==
S.No.	NH No.	Route	Length (km.)
1	1 (now 44)	From Delhi Border at Singhu, Narela - Panipat - Karnal - Ambala up to Punjab Border	1 km (0.62 mi)
2	2 (now 44)	From Delhi Border at Badarpur - Faridabad - Ballabhgarh - Palwal - Hodal up to Uttar Pradesh Border	1 km (0.62 mi)
3	8 (now 48)	From Delhi Border at Rajokri - Gurgaon - Manesar - Dharuhera - Bawal, Rewari - up to Rajasthan Border	1 km (0.62 mi)
4	10 (now 9)	From Delhi Border at Tikri - Bahadurgarh - Rohtak - Hisar - Sirsa - Dabwali up to Punjab Border	1 km (0.62 mi)
5	21A (now 105)	From Pinjore up to Himachal Pradesh Border towards Swarghat before Bilaspur	1 km (0.62 mi)
6	22 (now 5)	From Chandigarh to Panchkula - Kalka - up to Parwanoo on Himachal Pradesh Border	1 km (0.62 mi)
7	73 (now 344)	From Ambala up to Uttar Pradesh Border towards Roorkee	21 km (13 mi)

== Himachal Pradesh ==
S.No.	NH No.	Route	Length (km.)
1	1A	From Punjab Border - Kathua - Samba - Jammu - Nagrota - Udhampur - Batot - Ramban - Khanabal - Awantipora - Pampore - Srinagar - Pattan - Baramula - Uri	545 km (339 mi)
2	154	Pathankot - Mandi	220 km (140 mi)
3	21	Chandigarh - Ropar - Mandi - Kullu - Manali	323 km (201 mi)
4	21A	Pinjore - Swarghat	65 km (40 mi)
5	22	Ambala - Shimla - Rampur Bushahr - Up to Indo-China border near Shipki La	459 km (285 mi)
6	70	Jalandhar - Mandi	170 km (110 mi)
7	72	Ambala - Paonta - Haridwar	200 km (120 mi)
8	73A	Yamuna Nagar - Paonta Sahib	62 km (39 mi)
9	88	Kangra - Shimla	224 km (139 mi)
-	-	Total	2,264 km (1,407 mi)

== Jammu and Kashmir ==
S.No.	NH No.	Route	Length (km.)
1	1A	From Punjab Border - Kathua - Samba - Jammu - Nagrota - Udhampur - Batot - Ramban - Khanabal - Awantipora - Pampore - Srinagar - Pattan - Baramula - Uri	541 km (336 mi)
2	1B	Batote - Doda - Kistwar - Symthanpass - Khanabal	274 km (170 mi)
3	1C	Domel - Katra	8 km (5.0 mi)
4	1D	Srinagar - Kargil - Leh	422 km (262 mi)
-	-	Total	1,245 km (774 mi)

== Jharkhand ==
S.No.	NH No.	Route	Length (km.)
1	2	From Bihar Border - Chauparan - Barhi - Barakatha - Bagodar - Dumri - Topchanchi - Gobindpur - Nirsa - Maithan Dam up to West Bengal Border	190 km (120 mi)
2	6	From Orissa Border - Baharagora up to W.B. Border	22 km (14 mi)
3	23	Chas(Bokaro Steel City) - Gola - Ramgarh - Ranchi - Bero - Sisai - Gumla - Palkot - Kolebira - Simdega - Orissa Border	250 km (160 mi)
4	31	Jn. with NH2 near Barhi - Kodarama up to Bihar border	44 km (27 mi)
5	32	Junction with NH2 near Govindpur - Dhanbad - Chas(Bokaro Steel City) - West Bengal Border - Chandil - Jamshedpur	107 km (66 mi)
6	33	Junction with NH2 near Barhi - Hazaribag - Ramgarh - Ranchi - Bundu - Chandil - Jamshedpur- Mahulia - Junction with NH6 near Baharagora	352 km (219 mi)
7	75	From UP Border - Nagar untari - Garhwa - Daltonganj - Latehar - Chandwa - Kuru - Mandar - Ranchi - Khunti - Band Gaon - Chakradharpur - Chaibasa - Jainitgarh up to Orissa Border.	447 km (278 mi)
8	78	From Chhattisgarh Border - Silam - Gumla	25 km (16 mi)
91	80	From Bihar Border - Sahibganj - Talihari - Rajmahal - Barharwa up to West Bengal Border	100 km (62 mi)
10	98	From Bihar Border - Hariharganj - Chhatarpur terminating near Rajhara at NH75	50 km (31 mi)
11	99	Chandwa - Balumath - Chatra - Hunterganj up to Bihar Border	156 km (97 mi)
12	100	Chatra - Tutilawa - Hazaribagh - Meru - Daru-Kharika - Bagodar	118 km (73 mi)
-	-	Total	1,861 km (1,156 mi)

== Karnataka ==
S.No.	NH No.	Route	Length (km.)
1	4	From Maharashtra border - Nippani - Sankeshwar - Belgaum - Dharwad - Hubli - Haveri-Shiggoan - Ranebennur - HariharDavangere - Chitradurga - Sira - Tumkur - Nelamangala - Bangalore - Hoskote - Kolar - Mulbagal - Up to Andhra Pradesh border	700 km (430 mi)
2	4A	Belgaum - Khanapur - Gunji - Up to Goa border	82 km (51 mi)
3	7	From Andhra Pradesh border - Chik Ballapur - Devanahalli - Bangalore-Electronics City - Chandapura - Attibele - Up to Tamil Nadu border	125 km (78 mi)
4	9	From Maharashtra border - Rajeshwar - Homnabad - Mangalgi - Up to Andhra Pradesh border.	75 km (47 mi)
5	13	From Maharashtra border - Horti - Bijapur - Hungund - Kushtagi - Hospet - Jagalur - Chitradurga - Holalkere - Bhadravati - Shimoga - Tirthahalli - Karkal - Mangalore	719 km (447 mi)
6	17	From Goa border - Karwar - Ankola - Kumta - Honavar - Bhatkal - Kundapur - Udupi - Surathkal-Mangalore - Talapady - Up to Kerala border.	300 km (190 mi)
7	75	Nelamangala - Kunigal - Channarayapatna - Hassan - Alur - Sakleshpur - Uppinangadi - Mangalore	328 km (204 mi)
8	63	Ankola - Yellapur - Kalghatgi - Hubli - Gadag - Koppal - Hospet - Bellary up to Andhra Pradesh border	370 km (230 mi)
9	67	Gundlupet - Bandipur up to Tamil Nadu border	50 km (31 mi)
10	206	Tumkur - Tiptur - Arsikere - Kadur - Bhadravati - Shimoga - Sagar - Honavar and terminating at its junction with NH No.17 in Honavar.	363 km (226 mi)
11	173	From Mudigere-Chikmagalur-Kadur	72.1 km (44.8 mi)
12	207	From Tamil Nadu border - Sarjapur - Hoskote - Devanhalli - Doddaballapura -Dobbaspet	135 km (84 mi)
13	209	From Tamil Nadu border - Chamrajnagar - Kollegal - Malavalli - Kanakapura - Bangalore	170 km (110 mi)
14	212	From Kerala border - Gundlupet - Nanjangud - Mysore - T Narsipur - Kollegal	160 km (99 mi)
15	218	Hubli - Nargund - Kerur - Bijapur - Sindgi - Jevargi - Gulbarga and terminating at its junction with NH No.9 near Homnabad	399 km (248 mi)
16	234	Mangalore - Belthangady - Mudigere - Belur - Huliyar - Sira - Madhugiri - Gauribidanur - ChintamaniSrinivasapur - Up to Andhra Pradesh Border	509 km (316 mi)
-	-	Total	4,189 km (2,603 mi)

== Kerala ==
S.No.	NH No.	Route	Length (km.)
1	17	Karnataka Border - Manjeshwar - Kasaragod - Kanhangad - Payyannur - Kannur - Thalassery- Vatakara - Kozhikode (Calicut) - Feroke - Kottakkal - Valanchery - Kuttipuram - Ponnani - Chavakkad - Kodungallur - North Paravur Junction with NH 47 at Edappally, Kochi	421 km (262 mi)
2	47	Tamil Nadu Border - Walayar - Palakkad (Palghat) - Alathur - Mannuthy - Chalakudy - Angamaly - Aluva - Kochi (Edapally) - Kochi (Vytilla) - Cherthala - Alappuzha (Alleppey) - Kayamkulam - Kollam - Thiruvananthapuram - up to Kanniyakumari in Tamil Nadu border.	417 km (259 mi)
3	47A	Kochi bypass (Kundanur) Junction with 47 - Willingdon Island	6 km (3.7 mi)
4	47C	Kochi bypass (Kalamasserry Junction) with 47 - Vallarpadam	17.2 km (10.7 mi)
5	49	Kochi bypass (Kundanur Junction). - Thripunithura - Muvattupuzha - Kothamangalam - Adimali - Devikulam up to Tamil Nadu Border	167 km (104 mi)
6	183A	Adoor - Kaipattoor - Pathanamthitta - Mylapra - Laha - Vandiperiyar	156 km (97 mi)
7	208	Kollam - Kottarakara - Punalur - Thenmala - Aryankavu up to Tamil Nadu border	81 km (50 mi)
8	212	Kozhikode - Thamarassery - Kalpetta - Sultan Battery up to Karnataka Border	119 km (74 mi)
9	213	Palakkad - Mannarkkad - Perinthalmanna - Malappuram - Junction with NH 17 at Ramanattukara	125 km (78 mi)
10	220	Kollam - Kadavoor - Kundara - Kottarakara - Adoor - Pandalam - Chengannur - Thiruvalla - Changanassery - Kottayam - Ponkunnam - Kanjirapally - Mundakayam - Peermade - Vandiperiyar - Kumily up to Tamil Nadu border	190 km (120 mi)
-	-	Total	1,543.2 km (958.9 mi)

== Madhya Pradesh ==
S.No.	NH No.	Route	Length (km.)
1	3	Rajasthan border – Morena - Gwalior - Shivpuri - Guna - Biaora - Pachore - Sarangpur - Shajapur - Maksi - Dewas - Indore - Thikri - Sendhwa - up to Maharashtra border	712 km (442 mi)
2	7	From UP border - Mauganj - Mangawan - Rewa - Katni - Jabalpur - Lakhnadon - Seoni - Gopalganj - Khawasa up to Maharashtra border.	504 km (313 mi)
3	12	Jabalpur - Shahpura - Bareli - Obedullaganj - Bhopal - Narsinghgarh - Biaora - Rajgarh - Khilchipur up to Rajasthan border	490 km (300 mi)
4	12A	From the northern border with Uttar Pradesh - Orchha - Pirthipur - Tikamgarh - Shahgarh - Damoh - Tendukheda - Jabalpur - Mandla - Bichhi to the Chhattisgarh border at Chilpi	482 km (300 mi)
5	25	Shivpuri - Karera - UP border	82 km (51 mi)
6	26	From UP border - Barodia - Sagar - Deori - Narsimhapur - Lakhnadon	268 km (167 mi)
7	26A	The highway starting from its junction with NH86 near Sagar - connecting Jeruwakhera - Khurai and terminating at Bina	75 km (47 mi)
8	27	From UP border - Sohagi - Mangawan	50 km (31 mi)
9	59	From Gujarat border - Jhabua - Dhar - Indore	139 km (86 mi)
10	59A	Indore - Kannod - Khategaon - Harda - Sodalpur - Betul	264 km (164 mi)
11	69	Bhopal - Obedullaganj - Hoshangabad - Itarsi - Shahpur - Betul - Pandhurna - Chicholi - Maharashtra border	330 km (210 mi)
12	75	Gwalior - Datia - U.P. Border - Alipura - Chhatarpur - Panna - Satna - Rewa - Sidhi - Bargana - UP border	600 km (370 mi)
13	76	From Rajasthan border - Kota - Shivpuri	60 km (37 mi)
14	78	Katni - Umaria - Shahdol - Anupur - Chhattisgarh border	178 km (111 mi)
15	79	Rajasthan border - Nimach - Mandsaur - Ratlam - Ghata Bilod - Indore	280 km (170 mi)
16	86	From UP border - Chhatarpur - Hirapur - Banda - Sagar - Rahatgarh - Vidisha - Raisen - Bhopal - Sehore - Ashta - Dewas	494 km (307 mi)
17	86A	The highway starting from its junction with NH86 near Rahatgarh connecting Begamganj - Gairatganj - and terminating at its junction with NH86 in Bhopal	176 km (109 mi)
18	92	From UP border - Bhind - Mehgaon - Gwalior	96 km (60 mi)
-	-	Total	5,280 km (3,280 mi)

== Maharashtra ==
S.No.	NH No.	Route	Length (km.)
1	3	From MP Border - Sangvi - Dhule - Malegaon - Chandwad - Pimpalgaon Baswant - Ojhar - Nashik - Igatpuri - Bhiwandi - Thane - Mulund- Sion - Dadar - Mumbai	391 km (243 mi)
2	4	Junction with NH No.3 near Thane - Panvel - Pune - Satara- Kolhapur - Kagal up to Karnataka border	371 km (231 mi)
3	4B	Jawaharlal Nehru Port NH No.4 near km 109 Palaspe	20 km (12 mi)
4	4C	NH No.4 near Kalamboli at km 116 junction with NH No.4B km 16.687	7 km (4.3 mi)
5	6	From Gujarat border - Navapur - Visarwadi - Sakri - Dhule - Erandol - Jalgaon - Muktainagar - Malkapur - Khamgaon - Akola - Amravati - Nagpur - Bhandara - Deori - Raipur - Kolkata	813 km (505 mi)
6	7	From MP border - Deolapar - Nagpur - Hinganghat - Karanji up to Andhra Pradesh border.	232 km (144 mi)
7	8	From Gujarat border - Talasari - Bandra - Mumbai	128 km (80 mi)
8	9	Pune - Indapur - Solapur - Umarga up to Karnataka border.	336 km (209 mi)
9	13	Solapur - Nandnee - Karnataka border	43 km (27 mi)
10	16	From Andhra Pradesh border - Sironcha - Kopela up to Chhattisgarh Border	30 km (19 mi)
11	17	Panvel - Pen - Mahad - Poladpur - Khed - Asurde - Chiplun - Savarde - Sangameshwar - Hathkambe(Ratnagiri) - Pali - Lanja - Rajapur - Kharepatan - Kankavali - Kudal - Sawantwadi up to Goa border.	482 km (300 mi)
12	50	Nashik - Sinnar - Sangamner - Narayangaon - Rajgurunagar - Pune	192 km (119 mi)
13	69	Nagpur - Saoner up to MP border	55 km (34 mi)
14	161	Akola - Washim - Hingoli - Nanded - Telangana border	295 km (183 mi)
15	204	Ratnagiri - Pali - Sakharpa - Malakapur - Shahuwadi - Kolhapur - Sangli - Pandharpur - Solapur - Tuljapur - Latur - Nanded - Yavatmal - Wardha - Nagpur	974 km (605 mi)
16	211	Solapur - Osmanabad - Beed - Gevrai - Aurangabad - Chalisgaon - Dhule	600 km (370 mi)
17	222	The highway starting from the junction of NH3 near Kalyan - Otur - Alephata - Ahmednagar - Pathardi - Parbhani - Nanded - Bhokar -up to Andhra Pradesh border.	550 km (340 mi)
-	-	Total	5,519 km (3,429 mi)

== Meghalaya ==
S.No.	NH No.	Route	Length (km.)
1	40	From Assam border - Barni Hat - Shillong - Dauki - Jowai	216 km (134 mi)
2	44	Nongstoin - Shillong up to Assam border	277 km (172 mi)
3	51	From Assam border - Bajengdoda - Tura - Dalu	127 km (79 mi)
4	62	Damra - Dambu - Baghmara - Dalu	190 km (120 mi)
-	-	Total	810 km (500 mi)

== Mizoram ==
S.No.	NH No.	Route	Length (km.)
1	44A	From Tripura Border - Tukkalh - Mamit - Sairang - Aizawl	165 km (103 mi)
2	54	From Assam Border - Chhimlung - Bualpui - Aizawl - Zobawk - Pangzawl - Lawngtla - Tuipang	515 km (320 mi)
3	54A	Theriat - Lunglei	9 km (5.6 mi)
4	54B	Venus Saddle - Saiha	27 km (17 mi)
5	150	Aizawl - Phaileng - Thingsat up to Manipur Border	141 km (88 mi)
6	154	From Assam Border to Kanpui	70 km (43 mi)
-	-	Total	927 km (576 mi)

== Nagaland ==
S.No.	NH No.	Route	Length (km.)
1	36	From Assam Border - Dimapur	3 km (1.9 mi)
2	39	From Assam Border - Dimapur - Kohima up to Manipur Border	110 km (68 mi)
3	61	Kohima - Wokhal - Mokokchung - Merang Kong up to Assam Border	220 km (140 mi)
4	150	From Manipur Border - Kohima	36 km (22 mi)
5	155	Mokokchung - Tuensang - Shamatore - Kiphire - Meluri up to Manipur Border	327 km (203 mi)
-	-	Total	696 km (432 mi)

== Odisha ==
S.No.	NH No.	Route	Length (km.)
1	5	Junction with NH No.6 in Jharkhand near Baharagora - Baripada - Baleshwar - Bhadrak - Cuttack - Bhubaneswar - Khordha - Chhatrapur - Brahmapur up to Andhra Pradesh Border.	488 km (303 mi)
2	5A	Junction with NH No.5 near Haridaspur - Paradip Port	77 km (48 mi)
3	6	From Chhattisgarh Border - Lobarchatti - Bargarh - Sambalpur - Deogarh - Barkote - Kendujhargarh - Jashipur - Bangriposi up to Jharkhand Border	462 km (287 mi)
4	23	From barhi - Panposh - Rourkela - Rajamunda - Barkote - Pala Laharha - Talcher - Jn. with NH42	209 km (130 mi)
5	42	Junction with NH No.6 near Sambalpur - Rairakhol - Anugul - Dhenkanal - Jn. with NH5 near Cuttack	261 km (162 mi)
6	43	From Chhattisgarh Border - Dhanpunji - Borigumma - Jaypur - Koraput - Sunki - Andhra Pradesh Border.	152 km (94 mi)
7	60	From West Bengal Border - Jaleswar l.n.road- Baleshwar	57 km (35 mi)
8	75	From Jharkhand Border to junction with NH No.215 near Parsora	18 km (11 mi)
9	200	From Chhattisgarh - Machida - Jharsuguda - Kochinda - Deogarh - Talcher - Kamakhyanagar - Sukinda - Chandikhole	440 km (270 mi)
10	201	Borigumma - Ampani - Bhawanipatna - Belgan - Balangir - Luisinga - Jogisuruda - Dunguripali - Bargarh	310 km (190 mi)
11	203	Bhubaneshwar - Pipili - Puri - Konark	97 km (60 mi)
12	203A	The highway starting from its junction with NH203 at Puri, connecting Bramhagiri and terminating at Satpada	49 km (30 mi)
13	215	Panikoili -Jajpur Road - Anandapur - Ghatgan - Kendujhargarh - Parsora - Koira - Rajamunda	348 km (216 mi)
14	217	From Chhattisgarh Border - Nauparha - Khariar - Titlagarh - Belgan - Ramapur - Baligurha - Nuagaon - Raikia - G.Udayagiri - Kalinga - Bhanjanagar - Asika - Brahmapur - Narendrapur - Gopalpur	438 km (272 mi)
15	224	Khordha - Nayagarh - Dashapalla - Purunakatak - Bauda - Sonapur - Balangir	298 km (185 mi)
-	-	Total	3,704 km (2,302 mi)

== Punjab ==
S.No.	NH No.	Route	Length (km.)
1	1	From Haryana Border - Rajpura - Khanna - Ludhiana - Phagwara - Jalandhar - Amritsar - Atari up to Pak Border	254 km (158 mi)
2	1A	Jalandher - Dasuya - Pathankot up to J&K Border	108 km (67 mi)
3	10	From Haryana Border - Lambi - Malout - Abohar - Fazilka - Indo/Pak Border	72 km (45 mi)
4	15	Pathankot - Gurdaspur - Batala - Amritsar - Tarn Taran - Zira - Faridkot - Bhatinda - Malout - Abohar up to Rajasthan Border.	350 km (220 mi)
5	20	Pathankot and up to H.P. Border	10 km (6.2 mi)
6	21	From Chandigarh Border - Kharar - Kurali - Rupnagar - Ghanauli up to H.P. Border	67 km (42 mi)
7	22	From Haryana Border - Dera Bassi up to Haryana Border.	31 km (19 mi)
8	64	From Haryana Border - Banur - Rajpura - Patiala - Sangrur - Barnala - Rampura Phul - Bathinda up to Haryana Border.	255.5 km (158.8 mi)
9	70	Jalandhar - Hoshiarpur up to H.P. Border	50 km (31 mi)
10	71	Jalandher - Nakodar - Moga - Barnala - Dhanaula - Sangrur - Dogal up to Haryana Border.	130 km (81 mi)
11	72	From Haryana Border up to Haryana Border.	4.5 km (2.8 mi)
12	95	From Chandigarh Border - Kharar - Morinda - Ludhiana - Jagraon - Moga - Firozpur	225 km (140 mi)

== Puducherry ==
NH No.	S.No.	Route	Length (km.)
1	45A	Villupuram - Pondicherry - Cuddalore - Chidambaram - Sirkazhi - Karaikal - Nagapattinam	147 km (91 mi)
2	66	Pondicherry - Tindivanam - Gingee - Thiruvannamalai - Chengam - Uthangarai - Krishnagiri	208 km (129 mi)

== Rajasthan ==
S.No.	NH No.	Route	Length (km.)
1	3	From UP Border - Majiyan up to MP Border	32 km (20 mi)
2	8	From Haryana Border - Ajarka - Behror - Kotputli - Manoharpur - Jaipur - Kishangarh - Ajmer - Beawar - Bhim - Dewair - Nathdwara - Udaipur - Khairwara - Bechiwara up to Gujarat Border	688 km (428 mi)
3	11	From UP Border - Bharatpur - Mahwa - Dausa - Jaipur - Ringas - Sikar - Fatehpur - Ratangarh - Dungargarh - and terminating at Bikaner on NH 15.	531 km (330 mi)
4	11A	Manoharpur - Dausa - Lalsot and terminating at Kothum on NH 8.	145 km (90 mi)
5	11B	The highway starting from its junction with NH 11A near Lalsot connecting Gangapur - Karauli - Sir Muthra - Angai - Barauli - Bari - and terminating at Dhaulpur on NH 3.	180 km (110 mi)
6	12	From MP Border - Ghatoli - Aklera - Jhalawar - Kota - Bundi - Devli - Tonk - Kothum - Jaipur	400 km (250 mi)
7	14	Beawar - Chadawal - Pali - Sanderav - Sirohi - Pindwara - Abu Road - Mawal up to Gujarat Border	310 km (190 mi)
8	15	From Punjab Border - Ganganagar - Suratgarh - Lunkaransar - Bikaner - Kolayat - Phalodi - Pokaran - Jaisalmer - Devikot - Shiv - Barmer - Sanchor up to Gujarat Border	906 km (563 mi)
9	65	From Haryana Border - Rajgarh - Churu - Fatehpur - Salasar - Ladnun - Deh - Nagaur - Soila - Jodhpur - Pali	405 km (252 mi)
10	71B	From Haryana Border - Bhiwadi and up to Haryana Border near Taoru	5 km (3.1 mi)
11	76	Pindwara - Gogunda - Udaipur - Chittaurgarh - Kheri - Kota - Baran - Kishanganj - Shahbad - Deori up to MP Border	480 km (300 mi)
12	79	Ajmer - Nasirabad - Jharwasa - Chittaurgarh - Nimbahera up to MP Border	220 km (140 mi)
13	79A	Kishangarh (NH 8) - Nasirabad (NH 79)	35 km (22 mi)
14	89	Ajmer - Pushkar - Ren - Nagaur - Nokha - Bikaner	300 km (190 mi)
15	90	Baran - Aklera	100 km (62 mi)
16	112	The highway starting from its junction with NH 14 near Bar connecting Bar - Jaitaran - Bilara - Kaparda - Jodhpur - Kalyanpur - Pachpadra - Balotra - Tilwara - Kawas - Barmer	343 km (213 mi)
17	113	The highway starting from its junction of NH 79 near Nimbahera - Bari - Pratapgarh - Sohagpura - Banswara up to Gujarat Border	200 km (120 mi)
18	114	The highway starting from its junction with NH 65 near Jodhpur - Balesar - Shaitrawa - Dechhu and terminating at Pokaran on NH 15	180 km (110 mi)
19	116	The highway starting from its junction with NH 12 near Tonk - r - Uniara and terminating at Sawai Madhopur	80 km (50 mi)
20	758	The highway starting from its junction with NH 8 near Rajsamand - r - Bhilwara and terminating at Ladpura NH 76	160 km (99 mi)
-	-	Total	5,700 km (3,500 mi)

== Sikkim ==
S.No.	NH No.	Route	Length (km.)
1	31A	Gangtok - Singtam - Rangpo up to West Bengal Border	40 km (25 mi)

== Tamil Nadu ==
S.No.	NH No.	Route	Length in the State
1	4	From Mumbai - Pune, Bangalore - Ranipet - Sriperumbudur - Poonamallee - Chennai	133 km (83 mi)
2	5	From Andhra Pradesh Border - Arambakkam - Gummidipundi – Kavaraipettai - Chennai	58 km (36 mi)
3	7	From Karnataka Border - Hosur - Krishnagiri - Dharmapuri - Salem - Namakkal - Karur - Dindigul - Madurai - Virudhunagar - Sattur - Kovilpatti - Tirunelveli - Nanguneri - Vattakottai up to Kanyakumari	627 km (390 mi)
4	7A	Palayan Kottai - Vagaikulam - Tuticorin	51 km (32 mi)
5	45	Chennai - Tambaram - Chengalpattu - Madurantakam - Tindivanam - Viluppuram - Ulundurpettai - Trichy - Manapparai - Dindigul - Theni	472 km (293 mi)
6	45A	Villuppuram - Pondicherry - Cuddalore - Chidambaram - Poompuhar - Karaikal - Nagore - Nagappattinam	147 km (91 mi)
8	45B	Trichy - Viralimalai - Thuvarankurichchi - Melur - Madurai - Aruppukottai - Pandalgudi - Ettaiyapuram - Tuticorin	257 km (160 mi)
10	45C	Thanjavur - Kumbakonam - Sethiathope - Vadalur - Neyveli Township - Panruti and terminates near Villupuram (Vikravandi) on NH-45.	159 km (99 mi)
11	46	Krishnagiri - Vaniyambadi - Vellore - Walajapet	132 km (82 mi)
12	47	Salem- Bhavani - Perundurai - Avinashi - Coimbatore - It then enters Kerala. It re-enters Tamil Nadu border at Kaliyakkavilai - Kuzhithurai - Marthandam - Thuckalay - Nagercoil - Suchindrum - Kanyakumari.	244 km (152 mi)
13	47B	The highway starting from the junction of NH 47 near Nagercoil connecting Aralvaymozhi and terminating at its junction with NH7 near Kavalkinaru	45 km (28 mi)
14	49	From Kerala Border - Bodinayakkanur - Theni - Usilampatti - Madurai - Manamadurai - Paramakkudi - Ramanathapuram - Mandapam - Rameswaram	290 km (180 mi)
15	66	Krishnagiri - Uthangarai - Chengam - Tiruvannamalai - Gingee - Tindivanam - Pondicherry	208 km (129 mi)
16	67	Nagappattinam - Thiruvarur - Thanjavur - Trichy- Karur - Coimbatore - Mettupalayam - Ooty – Gudalur - Teppakadu up to Karnataka Border	505 km (314 mi)
17	68	Salem - Valapadi - Attur - Thalaivasal - Kallakkurichchi - Ulundurpettai	134 km (83 mi)
18	85	Kochin - Theni - Madurai - Sivagangai - Thondi	256 km (159 mi)
19	205	From Andhra Pradesh Border - Tiruttani - Tiruvallur - Ambathur - Chennai	82 km (51 mi)
20	207	Hosur - Bagalur - up to Karnataka Border	20 km (12 mi)
21	208	From Kerala Border - Sengottai - Tenkasi - Sivagiri - Srivilliputtur - T.Kallupati - Thirumangalam-Madurai	125 km (78 mi)
22	209	Dindigul - Palani - Madathukulam - Udumalaippettai - Pollachi - Coimbatore - Punjai Puliamapatti - Satyamangalam - Hasanur up to Karnataka Border	286 km (178 mi)
23	210	Trichy - Pudukkottai - Tirumayam - Kanadukathan - Karaikkudi - Devakottai - Devipattinam - Ramanathapuram	160 km (99 mi)
24	219	From Andhra Pradesh Border - Krishnagiri	22 km (14 mi)
25	220	From Kerala Border - Gudalur - Cumbum - Uthamapalayam - Theni	55 km (34 mi)
26	226	Perambalur, Kunnam, Ariyalur, Paluvur, Thiruvaiyaru, Thanjavur - Gandharvakottai - Pudukkottai - Thirumayam - Kilasevalpatti - Tirupathur - Madagupatti - Sivaganga - Manamadurai	212 km (132 mi)
27	227	Trichy - Lalgudi - Kallakudi - Kizhapalur - Udaiarpalayam - Jayamkondam - Gangaikondacholapuram - Kattumannarkoil - Lalpet - Kumaratchi - Chidambaram	135 km (84 mi)
28	234	From Andhra Pradesh Border - Peranampattu - Gudiyatham - Vellore City - Polur - Tiruvanamalai - Villupuram	
29	67	From OOTY-METTUPALAYAM - PALLADAM - KANGEYAM - VELLAKOVIL City - KARUR - TRICHY - THANJAVORENAGAPATTINAM	234 km (145 mi)
-	-	Total	5,016 km (3,117 mi)

== Telangana ==
S.No.	NH No.	Route	Length in the State
1	7	Maharashtra Border - Adilabad - Nirmal - Ramayampet - Hyderabad - Mahabubnagar - AP Border	519.64 km
2	9	Karnataka Border - Zahirabad - Hyderabad - Suryapet - AP border	291.74 km
3	16	Nizamabad - Armur - Jagtial - Lakshettipet - Chinnur - Maharashtra Border	235.15 km
4	167	Karnataka border - Mehboobnagar - Jadcherla (NH-44)	112 km
5	202	Hyderabad - Jangaon - Warangal - Venkatapuram - Chhattisgarh Border	306 km
6	221	AP Border - Penuballi - Kottagudam - Paloncha - Bhadrachalam - Chinturu - Chhattisgarh border	100 km
7	222	Maharashtra border - Narsapur - Nirmal (NH-7)	53.6 km
8	161 New	Sangareddy on NH-65 - Maharashtra Border	140.5 km
9	363 New 365 New 565 New	Maharashtra Border - Mahadevpur - Parkal - Atmakur on NH-163 Nakrekal on NH-65 - Thungathurthy - Mahabubabad - Narsampet - Mallampalli on NH-163. Nakrekal on NH-65 - AP Border	450 km
10	563 New	Jagityal on NH-63 - Karimnagar - Warangal on NH-163	136 km
11	365A New	Kodad on NH-65 - Khammam- Mahabubabad on NH-365	75 km
12	765 New	Hyderabad (NH-44&40) - Amangal - Veldanda - Kalvakurti - Vangoor - Achampeta - AP border	196 km
-	-	Total	2615.63 km

== Tripura ==
S.No.	NH No.	Route	Length (km.)
1	44	From Assam Border - Ambassa - Agartala - Udaipur - Sabroom	335 km (208 mi)
2	44A	From Mizoram Border - Sakhan - Manu	65 km (40 mi)
-	-	Total	400 km (250 mi)

== Uttar Pradesh ==
S.No.	NH No.	Route	Length (km.)
1	2	From Haryana Border - Kosi - Mathura - Agra - Firozabad - Etawah - Aurraiya - Kanpur - Fatehpur - Allahabad - Gopiganj - Varanasi - Chandauli up to Bihar Border	752 km (467 mi)
2	2A	Sikandra - Bhognipur	25 km (16 mi)
3	3	Agra up to Rajasthan Border	26 km (16 mi)
4	7	Varanasi - Mirzapur - Lalganj - Baraundha up to M.P. Border	128 km (80 mi)
5	11	Agra - Kiraoli up to Rajasthan Border	51 km (32 mi)
6	12A	From MP Border up to junction with NH 26 near Jhansi	7 km (4.3 mi)
7	19	Ghazipur - Ballia - Rudrapur up to Bihar Border	120 km (75 mi)
8	24	From Delhi Border - Ghaziabad - Hapur - Moradabad - Rampur - Bareilly - Shahjahanpur - Sitapur - Lucknow	431 km (268 mi)
9	24B	Allahabad - Rae Bareli - Lucknow	189 km (117 mi)
10	24A	Bakshi-Ka-Talab - Chinhat (NH 28)	17 km (11 mi)
11	25	Lucknow - Unnao - Kanpur - Orai - Jhansi - Raksa up to M.P. Border	270 km (170 mi)
12	25A	Km19 (NH 25) - Bakshi-Ka-Talab	31 km (19 mi)
13	26	Jhansi - Lalitpur - Gona up to MP Border	128 km (80 mi)
14	27	Allahabad - Jasra up to MP Border	43 km (27 mi)
15	28	From Bihar Border - Tryasujan - Gorakhpur - Basti - Faizabad - Barabanki - Lucknow	311 km (193 mi)
16	28B	From Bihar Border - Padrauna - Kasia - Junction with NH28	29 km (18 mi)
17	28C	Bara Banki - Ramnagar - Bahraich - Nanpara up to Nepal Border	140 km (87 mi)
18	29	Sonauli - Farenda - Gorakhpur - Chillupar - Kopaganj - Ghazipur - Saidpur - Varanasi	360 km (220 mi)
19	56	Lucknow - Amethi - Jagdishpur - Sultanpur - Badlapur - Jaunpur - Varanasi	285 km (177 mi)
20	56A	Chinhat (NH 28) km.16 (NH 56)	13 km (8.1 mi)
21	56B	km.16 on NH56 to km.19 of NH25.	19 km (12 mi)
22	58	From Delhi Border - Ghaziabad - Meerut - Muzaffarnagar - Purkazi up to Uttarakhand Border	165 km (103 mi)
23	72A	Chhutmalpur up to Uttarakhand Border.	30 km (19 mi)
24	73	From Uttarakhand Border - Saharanpur - Sarsawa up to Haryana Border	60 km (37 mi)
25	74	From Uttarakhand Border - Najibabad - Nagina - Dhampur - Afzalgarh - Uttarakhand Border - Amaria - Jahanabad - Pilibhit - Nawabganj - Bareilly	147 km (91 mi)
26	75	From Rewa, MP - Karari - Jhansi –Makrar - Maurampur - MP to UP - Renukoot - Dudhinagar - Wyndhamganj - UP to JH - Ranchi	110 km (68 mi)
27	76	From MP Border - Jhansi - Mauranipur - MP Border - Kulpahar - Mahoba - Banda - Karwi - Mau - Jasra - Allahabad	488 km (303 mi)
28	86	Kanpur - Ghatampur - Hamirpur - Maudaha - Kabrai - Mahoba - MP Border.	180 km (110 mi)
29	87	Rampur - Bilaspur	32 km (20 mi)
30	91	Ghaziabad - Dadri - Sikanderabad - Bulandshahr - Khurja - Amiya - Aligarh - Etah - Chhibramau - Kannauj - Kanpur	405 km (252 mi)
31	91A	The highway starting from its junction with NH 2 near Etawah connecting Bharthana - Bidhuna - Bela and terminating at its junction with NH 91 near Kannauj	126 km (78 mi)
32	92	Bhongoan - Bewar - Kishni - Etawah - Udi up to Rajasthan Border	75 km (47 mi)
33	93	Agra - Hathras - Aligarh - Babrala - Chandausi - Bilari - Moradabad	220 km (140 mi)
34	96	Faizabad - Sultanpur - Bela - Pratapgarh - Soraon - Allahabad	160 km (99 mi)
35	97	Ghazipur - Zamania - Saiyedraja	45 km (28 mi)
36	119	The highway starting from its junction with NH 58 near Meerut connecting Mawana - Bahsuma - Bijnor - Kiratpur - Najibabad and up to Uttarakhand border.	125 km (78 mi)
37	231	Raebareli - partapgarh - Machlishahar - Jaunpur	169 km (105 mi)
38	232	tanda - sultanpur - gauriganj - raebareli - lalganj - fatehpur - banda	305 km (190 mi)
39	330A	Raebareli - jagdishpur - faizabad	227 km (141 mi)
40	235	The highway starting from Meerut connecting Hapur, Gulaothi and terminating at Bulandshahar.	75 km (47 mi)
-	-	Total	6,519 km (4,051 mi)

== Uttarakhand ==
S.No.	NH No.	Route	Length (km.)
1	58	From Uttar Pradesh Border - Manglaur - Roorkee - Haridwar - Rishikesh - Shivpuri - Devprayag - Srinagar - Khankra - Rudraprayag - Karnaprayag - Chamoli Gopeshwar - Joshimath - Badrinath - Mana Pass	373 km (232 mi)
2	72	From Himachal Pradesh Border - Dhalipur - Sahaspur - Jhajra - Dehradun - Bullawala - Haridwar	100 km (62 mi)
3	72A	From Uttar Pradesh Border - Majra - Dehradun	15 km (9.3 mi)
4	73	Roorkee - Bhagwanpur up to Uttar Pradesh Border	20 km (12 mi)
5	74	Haridwar - Uttar Pradesh - Nagina - Najibabad - Dhampur - Afzalgarh - Uttarakhand - Jaspur - Kashipur - Barakhera - Rudrapur - Kichha - Sitarganj and up to Uttar Pradesh Border.	153 km (95 mi)
6	87	From Uttar Pradesh Border - Rudrapur - Pantnagar - Haldwani - Nainital - Bhowali - Almora - Ranikhet - Dwarahat - Chaukhutia - Gairsain - Adi Badri and connecting with NH 58 near Karnaprayag	284 km (176 mi)
7	94	Rishikesh - Ampata - New Tehri - Chham - Dharasu - Kuthanaur - Kharsali - Yamunotri	160 km (99 mi)
8	108	Dharasu - Uttarkashi - Maneri - Bhatwari - Purga - Bhaironghati - Gaurikund - Gangotri	127 km (79 mi)
9	109	Rudraprayag - Tilwara - Guptakashi - Kedarnath	76 km (47 mi)
10	119	From Uttar Pradesh Border - Kotdwar - Banghat - Bubakhal - Pauri - Srinagar	135 km (84 mi)
11	121	The highway starting from its junction with NH 74 near Kashipur - Ramnagar - Dhumakot - Thalisain - Tripalisain - Pabo - Paithani and terminating at NH 119 near Bubakhal	252 km (157 mi)
12	123	The highway starting from its junctions with NH 72 connecting near Herbertpur - Vikasnagar - Kalsi - Badowala - Nainbagh - Naugaon - Barkot	95 km (59 mi)
13	125	The highway starting from its junction with NH 74 near Sitarganj - Khatima - Tanakpur - Champawat - Pithoragarh - Dharchula - Tawaghat	201 km (125 mi)
-	-	Total	1,991 km (1,237 mi)

== West Bengal ==
S.No.	NH No.	Route	Length (km.)
1	2	From Jharkhand border - Barakar - Asansol - Raniganj - Durgapur - Panagarh - Palsit - Dankuni near Calcutta/Kolkata	235 km (146 mi)
2	6	From Jharkhand Border - Kharagpur - Debra - Panskura - Kolaghat - Bagnan - Dankuni near Kolkata	161 km (100 mi)
3	31	Dalkhola - Kanki - Panjipara - Islampur - Bagdogra - Sevok - Mainaguri - Gairkata - Falakata - Cooch Behar - Tufanganj up to Assam Border	366 km (227 mi)
4	31A	Sevok - Namthang up to Sikkim Border	30 km (19 mi)
5	31C	Galgalia - Naxalbari - Bagdogra - Chalsa - Nagrakata - Gairkata - Alipurdura up to Assam Border.	142 km (88 mi)
6	32	From Jharkhand Border - Goorinathdham - Puruliya - Kantadih - Urma - Balarampur up to Jharkhand Border	72 km (45 mi)
7	34	Dalkhola - Karandighi - Raiganj - Pandua - Ingraj Bazar - Morgram - Baharampur - Palashi - Krishnanagar - Barasat–Kolkata	443 km (275 mi)
8	35	Barasat - Gaighata - Bangaon - Petrapole on India– Bangladesh border.	61 km (38 mi)
9	41	Junction with NH-6 near Panskura - Tamluk - Mahishadal - Haldia Port.	51 km (32 mi)
10	55	Siliguri - Kurseong - Darjeeling	77 km (48 mi)
11	60	From Orissa Border - Dantan - Belda - Kharagpur - Midnapore - Bankura - Mejia - Raniganj and terminating at its junction with NH 2	389 km (242 mi)
12	60A	Bankura - Chhatna - Hura - Landhurka - Puruliya	100 km (62 mi)
13	80	Farrakka up to Bihar Border	10 km (6.2 mi)
14	81	From Bihar Border - Harishchandrapur - Kumangarj - Malda	55 km (34 mi)
15	117	Setu - Kolkata - Diamond Harbour - Kulpi - Namkhana - Bakkhali	138 km (86 mi)
16	116B	Nandakumar - Contai - Digha - Chandaneswar	91 km (57 mi)
-	-	Total	2,421 km (1,504 mi)

== See also ==
- 2010 renumbering of national highways in India
- National Highways Authority of India
- National Highways Development Project
