= National Highway 520 (India) =

National highway in India

National Highway 520
- Map of National Highway 520 in red

Route information
- Auxiliary route of NH 20
- Length: 105 km (65 mi)

Major junctions
- From: Parsora, Rimuli
- To: Rajamunda, Barkote

Location
- Country: India
- States: Odisha

Highway system
- Roads in India; Expressways; National; State; Asian
← NH 20	→ NH 143

National Highway 520 (NH 520) is a National Highway in India. This highway runs entirely in Odisha. This road was passed in year 2002 as N.H. 2I5 initially, this highway was a part of N.H. 215 National Highway 215 Details: National Highway 215 (NH 215) is an Indian National Highway entirely within the state of Orissa.

In Orissa it used to covers 348 km This highway is also known as Rimuli-Rajamunda-Barkote Road. Rimuli-Rajamunda 105 kilometres (65 mi) stretch is now NH520 & Rajamunda-Barkote stretch is NH143. NH143 is now Ranchi-Rourkela-Barkote Highway.

The highway is maintained by National Highways Authority of India. National Highway 215 or (NH 215) is a National Highway that links the Panikoili to the town of Rajamunda It runs for a distance of 348 km (216 mi).

National Highway No. 215 passes through: Panikoili – Keonjhar – Rajamunda

Then it was bifurcated to 215 and 520. The 215 part was suitably completed and 520 continued. The 520 part is the biggest iron ore region of Asia, without proper connectivity. As the activities increased several jams occurred due to vehicle breakdown. Owing to the intense congestion thousands lost lives or were maimed, specially those in small vehicles and motorcycles. The contractors are very lethargic and the N.H. Authority also finds it difficult to manage as it operates from Rourkela, instead of having office at Barbil or Koida the epicentre of all jams.
