= Hirapur =

Hirapur may refer to:

- Hirpaur, Chatkhil, Noakhali, Bangladesh, a highly educated well developed village in Chatkhil Upazila.
- Hirapur, Balaghat, a census town in Balaghat, Madhya Pradesh, India
- Hirapur, Sagar, a village in Sagar district of madhya Pradesh
- Hirapur (Assembly constituency), an assembly constituency in West Bengal, India
- Hirapur, Uttar Pradesh, a village in Ambedkar Nagar, Uttar Pradesh, India
- Hirapur, Khurda, a village in Bhubaneswar, Odisha, India
- Hirpora, a village in Jammu and Kashmir
- a neighbourhood of Dhanbad in the Indian state of Jharkhand; see Dhanbad Municipal Corporation
