= National Highway 62 (India, old numbering) =

Old numbering of road in India

National Highway 62

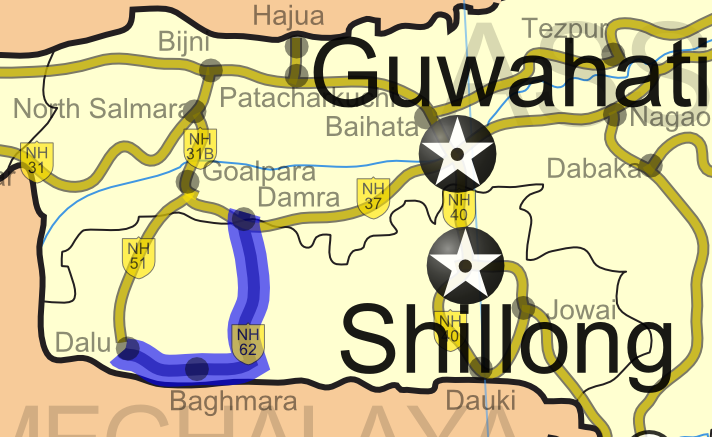
- Road map of India with National Highway 62 highlighted in blue

Route information
- Length: 195 km (121 mi)

Major junctions
- From: Damra, Assam
- To: Dalu, Meghalaya

Location
- Country: India
- States: Assam: 5 km (3.1 mi); Meghalaya: 190 km (120 mi)
- Primary destinations: Baghmara

Highway system
- Roads in India; Expressways; National; State; Asian
← NH 61	→ NH 63

National Highway 62 (NH 62) is a National Highway in Northeast India. It starts from Damra in Assam and ends at Dalu, in Meghalaya. The highway is 195 km (121 mi) long, of which 5 km (3.1 mi) is in Assam and 190 is in Meghalaya.

== Route ==
In 2010, the highway was renumbered to form part of present-day NH 217.

- Baghmara

== See also ==
- List of national highways in India
- National Highways Development Project
