= NH 12A =

NH 12A may refer to:

- National Highway 12A (India)
- New Hampshire Route 12A, United States
