= NH 11A =

NH 11A may refer to:

- National Highway 11A (India, old numbering)
- New Hampshire Route 11A, United States
