= National Highway 105 (India) =

National highway in India

National Highway 105
- National Highway highlighted in red

Route information
- Length: 67 km (42 mi)

Major junctions
- South end: Pinjore, Haryana
- North end: Swarghat, Himachal Pradesh

Location
- Country: India
- States: Himachal Pradesh, Haryana
- Primary destinations: Baddi, Nalagarh

Highway system
- Roads in India; Expressways; National; State; Asian
← NH 5	→ NH 205

National Highway 105, commonly referred to as NH 105, is a national highway in India running from Pinjore in Haryana to Swarghat in Himachal Pradesh. The highway passes through the states of Himachal Pradesh and Haryana.

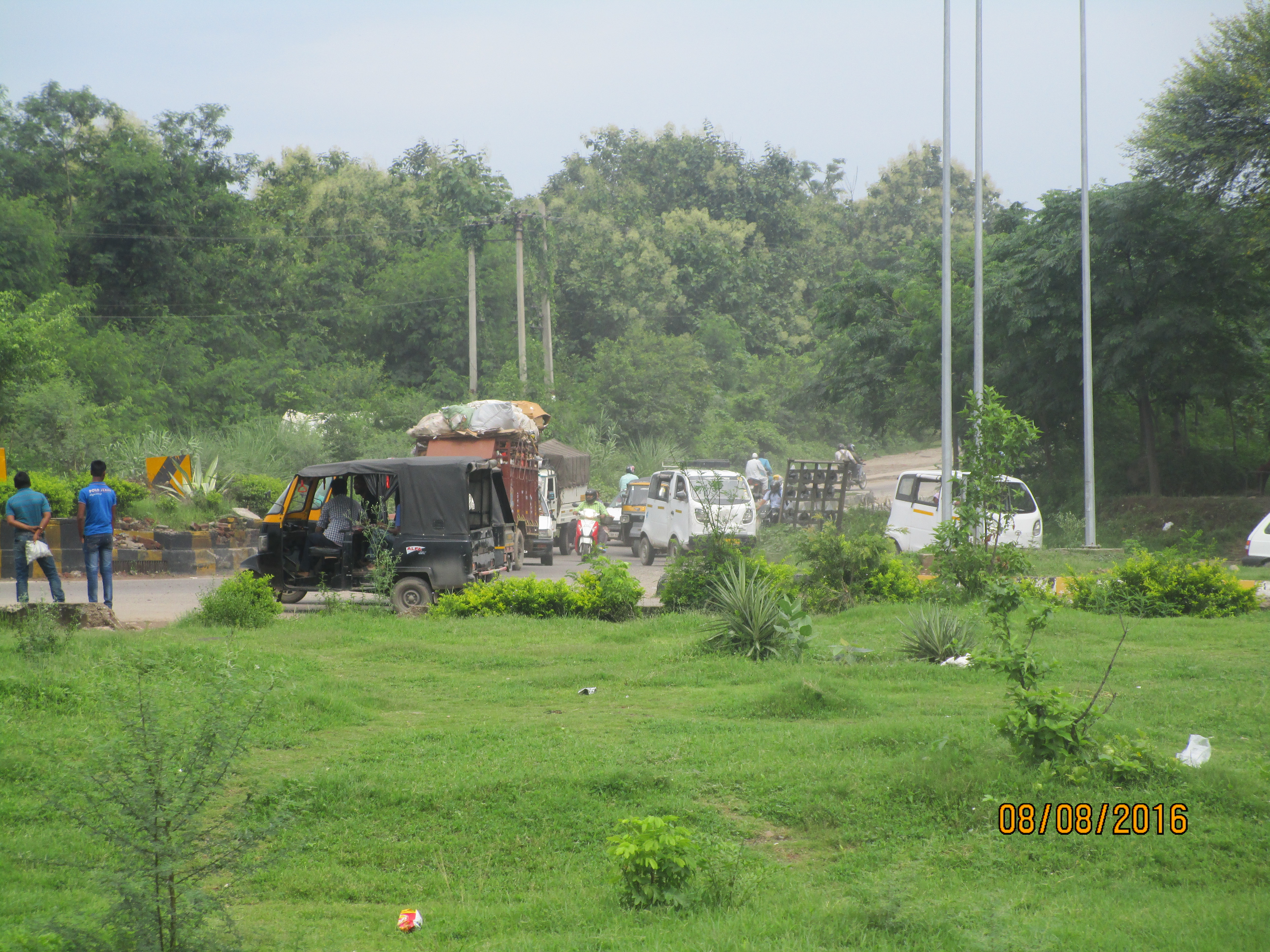
NH 105 at Pinjore
