= National Highway 86A (India, old numbering) =

Old numbering of road in India

National Highway 86A

Route information
- Length: 131 km (81 mi)

Major junctions
- From: Rahatgarh, Madhya Pradesh
- To: Raisen, Madhya Pradesh

Location
- Country: India
- States: Madhya Pradesh: 131 km (81 mi)
- Primary destinations: Rahatgarh - Begamganj - Gairatganj - Dehgaon - Raisen

Highway system
- Roads in India; Expressways; National; State; Asian
← NH 86	→ NH 87

National Highways 86A (NH 86A) is an Indian National Highway is proposed NH entirely within the state of Madhya Pradesh. This 131 km (81 mi) long National Highway will link Rahatgarh to Raisen.

== New Numbering ==
This highway is nor renumbered as National Highway 146. New numbered NH86 currently falls under Tamil Nadu running from National Highway 32 near Mimisalam, Aranthangi, Pudukkottai, Manapparai, Kulithalai, Kannanur, Namakkal, Kollimalai (Kolli Hills) ending at NH44 at Rasipuram covering 290 km (180 mi) distance. Another National Highway 186 is running from Thuvarankurichi, Manapparai, Kulithulai, Nochiyam, Lalgudi on National Highway 81 covering 123 km (76 mi) distance. Again National Highway 386 is running from National Highway 79 near Attur, Thammampatti, Thuraiyur, Nochiyam covering 100 km (62 mi) distance along with National Highway 786 which is running from National Highway 81 near Karur, Vaiyampatti, Manapparai covering 79 km (49 mi) distance. All these Highways currently falls under Tamil Nadu after renumbering was done in 2009-10 period.
