= National Highway 927A (India) =

National Highway in India

National Highway 927A
- Map of the National Highway in red

Route information
- Length: 152 km (94 mi)

Major junctions
- West end: Swaroopganj
- East end: Ratlam

Location
- Country: India
- States: Rajasthan, Madhya Pradesh

Highway system
- Roads in India; Expressways; National; State; Asian
← NH 27	→ NH 79

National Highway 927A, commonly referred to as NH 927A is a national highway in India. It is a spur road of National Highway 27. NH-927A traverses the states of Rajasthan and Madhya Pradesh in India.

== Route ==
Swaroopganj, Kotra, Kherwara, Dungarpur, Sagwara, Partapur, Banswara, Ratlam.

== Junctions ==
NH 27 Terminal near Sawarupganj.
NH 58 near Kotra.
NH 48 near Kherwara
NH 56 near Banswara.
NH 79 Terminal near Ratlam.

== See also ==
- List of national highways in India
- List of national highways in India by state
