= Sihori =

Shihori
- /Town
- Location in Gujarat, India Shihori (India)
- Coordinates: 23.9667°N 71.8167°E
- Country: India
- State: Gujarat
- Elevation: 51 m (167 ft)

Population (2001)
  - Total: more than 20,000

Languages
  - Official: Gujarati, Hindi
- Time zone: UTC+5:30 (IST)
- PIN: 385550
- Vehicle registration: GJ 8
- Website: gujaratindia.com

Shihori (also Shihori) is a town in Banaskantha district of the Indian state of Gujarat. It is the administrative headquarters of the Kankrej Taluka and has a population of more than 10,000.

== Transport ==
=== Rail ===
Shihori railway station is near Umbari village on the Patan-Bhildi line. Shihori station connects to Bhildi, Patan, Rajasthan, Machilipatnam, and Jaswantpura.

=== Air ===
The nearest airport is Ahmedabad International Airport, approximately 158 km (98.17 miles) away.

=== Road ===
National Highway 14 passes through Sihori, connecting it to cities including Ahmedabad, Palanpur, Patan and Radhanpur.

Sihori has 300+ buses linking to various parts of Gujarat.

== Climate ==
Summers are hot and humid with an average temperature of 40 C, with hot sandy winds. Winters are mild with temperatures between five and fifteen degrees. In the monsoon season rainfall is between 38 and 76 cm.

== Temples ==
Sihori has several temples:

- Jogni Mata Mandir
- Bahuchar Mata Mandir
- Ramji Mandir
- Hanuman Duga Vada Mandir
- Mahamandleswar Mahadev
- Gau Mata Mandir (Temple of Cow)
- Jain Adinath Mandir

== Education ==
Sihori has two primary education government schools. A high school is named M.V. Valani High School. A private school is named Sarvottam School of Education.

== Economy ==
Sihori has branches of the State Bank of India, Dena Bank, Bank of Baroda, Banas Bank, Nagrik Bank, and Dena Gujarat Gramin Bank. The currency used is the Indian rupee (INR)

Sihori has milk cooperative societies and cold storage facilities.
