= Aunsi =

Town in India

Aunsi Babhangama North
- Village
- Nickname: Aunsi goth
- Location in Bihar, India Aunsi Babhangama North (India)
- Coordinates: 26°19′0″N 85°58′0″E
- Country: India
- State: Bihar
- Region: Mithila
- District: Madhubani
  - Rank: 1

Languages
  - Official: Maithili, Hindi, Urdu
- Time zone: UTC+5:30 (IST)
- PIN: 847121
- Coastline: 0 kilometres (0 mi)

Aunsi Babhangama or Aunsi Gote is one of the developing small town in Madhubani district of Bihar India over one decade, It is situated both side of National Highway 105, this high way distance is 55 km which starts from Darbhanga that passes through Aunsi Gote to Jainagar that is nearby Nepal Border. Aunsi Gote is 20 km far from Darbhanga city to Jainagar. Nearest airport is Darbhanga Airport. Majority populations are Muslims.

== Geography ==
It is located at .

. Darbhanga airport
