= National Highway 127B (India) =

National highway in India

National Highway 127B
- Map of the National Highway in red

Route information
- Length: 401 km (249 mi)

Major junctions
- North end: Srirampur, Assam
- South end: Nongston, Meghalaya

Location
- Country: India
- States: Meghalaya, Assam

Highway system
- Roads in India; Expressways; National; State; Asian
← NH 27	→ NH 106

National Highway 127B, commonly called NH 127B is a National Highway in North East India that connects Srirampur in Assam to Nongston in Meghalaya.

== Route ==
Srimrampur – Dhuburi - Phulbari - Tura - Rongram - Ronjeng - Nongstoin.

== Junctions ==
- Terminal with National Highway 15 near Srimrampur.
- Junction with National Highway 17 near Gauripur
- Junction with National Highway 217 near Tura
- Terminal with National Highway 215 near Nongston.

== Geography ==
Major portion of NH-127B, over 300 km lies in state of Meghalaya. This highway passes through four districts, namely, West Garo, South West Garo, East Garo and West Khasi Hills of Meghalaya. The alignment of the road in Meghalaya starts initially from rolling terrain and then major portion passes mainly through a hilly terrain and the road has to cross numerous rivers and streams.

== See also ==
- List of national highways in India
- List of national highways in India by state
