= Chilpi =

- town
- Location in Chhattisgarh, India Chilpi (India)
- Coordinates: 22°10′0″N 81°03′0″E
- Country: India
- State: Chhattisgarh
- District: Kabirdham
- Elevation: 807 m (2,648 ft)

Languages
  - Official: Hindi, Chhattisgarhi
- Time zone: UTC+5:30 (IST)
- Vehicle registration: CG
- Coastline: 0 kilometres (0 mi)

Chilpi is a town in Kabirdham district of Chhattisgarh, India

== Geography ==
It is located at an elevation of 807 m above MSL.

== Location ==
National Highway 12A passes through Chilpi. Nearest airport is Raipur Airport.
