= Kherwara Chhaoni =

- Interactive map of Kherwara Chhaoni
- Coordinates: 23.9833°N 73.5833°E
- Country: India
- State: Rajasthan
- District: Udaipur
- Named for: Kher (Khair) tree Senegalia catechu

Area
  - Total: 10 km^{2} (3.9 sq mi)
- Elevation: 326 m (1,070 ft)

Population (2011)
  - Total: 6,649
  - Density: 660/km^{2} (1,700/sq mi)

Languages
  - Official: Hindi
  - Local: Hindi, Mewadi Wagdi
- Time zone: UTC+5:30 (IST)
- PIN: 313803
- Telephone code: 02907
- ISO 3166 code: RJ-IN
- Vehicle registration: RJ 27

Kherwara Chhaoni is a census town in the Udaipur district, Rajasthan, India. It is part of the Mewar region, which includes the districts of Dungarpur, Banswara and parts of Udaipur district. It is in close proximity to two major highways, National Highway 8 and Rajasthan State Highway 76 and National Highway 927A passes through it. Its name derives from the large number of Kher (Khair) trees in the region in the past.

Prominent institutions in the area are Mewar Bhil Corps and Police Training School (PTS).

== Geography ==
Kherwara Chhaoni is a sub-division in the Udaipur district located some 80 km (50 mi) from the Rajasthan-Gujarat border. Ahemdabad, the capital of Gujarat state, is 170 km (110 mi) away. The topography of the area consists of medium to high rocky hills, contours, plains and is surrounded by Aravalli Range from north to south. The hills have forests that are an essential source of income and help sustain the economy of the local tribal inhabitants. There are many well-developed villages, such as Jawas, Chhani, Bawalwada, and Karawara among others.

The area is semi-arid with an average annual rainfall of about 650 mm (26 in). Most rain falls during the monsoon season from July to September. Winter temperatures range from a low of 2 °C (36 °F) to a high of 25 °C (77 °F). Summer temperatures range from a low of 20 °C (68 °F) to a high of 42 °C (108 °F). Relative humidity is above 70% during the monsoon months but below 20% during the months of March through May.

The area is particularly rich in mineral resources, such as Green Marble (Serpentinite), Soapstone and Asbestos. Private companies use semi-mechanized and manual methods for mining operations.

It is located on National Highway 8 which connects it to Mumbai (distance: 700 km (430 mi)) and Delhi (distance: 750 km (470 mi)). Rajasthan State Road Transport Corporation services also provide road connectivity via public transport. The nearby railway stations are Dungarpur (distance: 23 km (14 mi)) and Udaipur (distance: 80 km (50 mi)) with trains available for major routes. The nearest airports are Dabok (distance: 100 km (62 mi)) and Ahmedabad (distance: 160 km (99 mi)).

== Demographics ==
As per the 2011 Indian census, the population of Kherwara Chhaoni was 6,649 individuals living in 1,323 households. Out of this, 52% (3,457) were male and 48% (3,192) were female. Out of the total population, 14% were under 6 years of age and 72% were literate (a rate higher than the national average of 59.5%). The break-up of literate residents was 79% male and 64% female.
