= National Highway 11A (India, old numbering) =

Old numbering of road in India

National Highway 11A
- Map of Old NH 11A in red

Route information
- Length: 145 km (90 mi)

Major junctions
- North end: Manoharpur
- South end: Kothum

Location
- Country: India
- States: Rajasthan: 145 km (90 mi)
- Primary destinations: Dausa - Lalsot

Highway system
- Roads in India; Expressways; National; State; Asian
← NH 11	→ NH 11B

National Highway 11A (NH 11A) was an Indian National Highway entirely within the state of Rajasthan, that connected Manoharpur with Kothum and was 145 km (90 mi) long. Under new renumbering rules the section between Manoharpur and Lalsot was named NH 148, while the section between Lalsot and Kothum became part of NH 23.

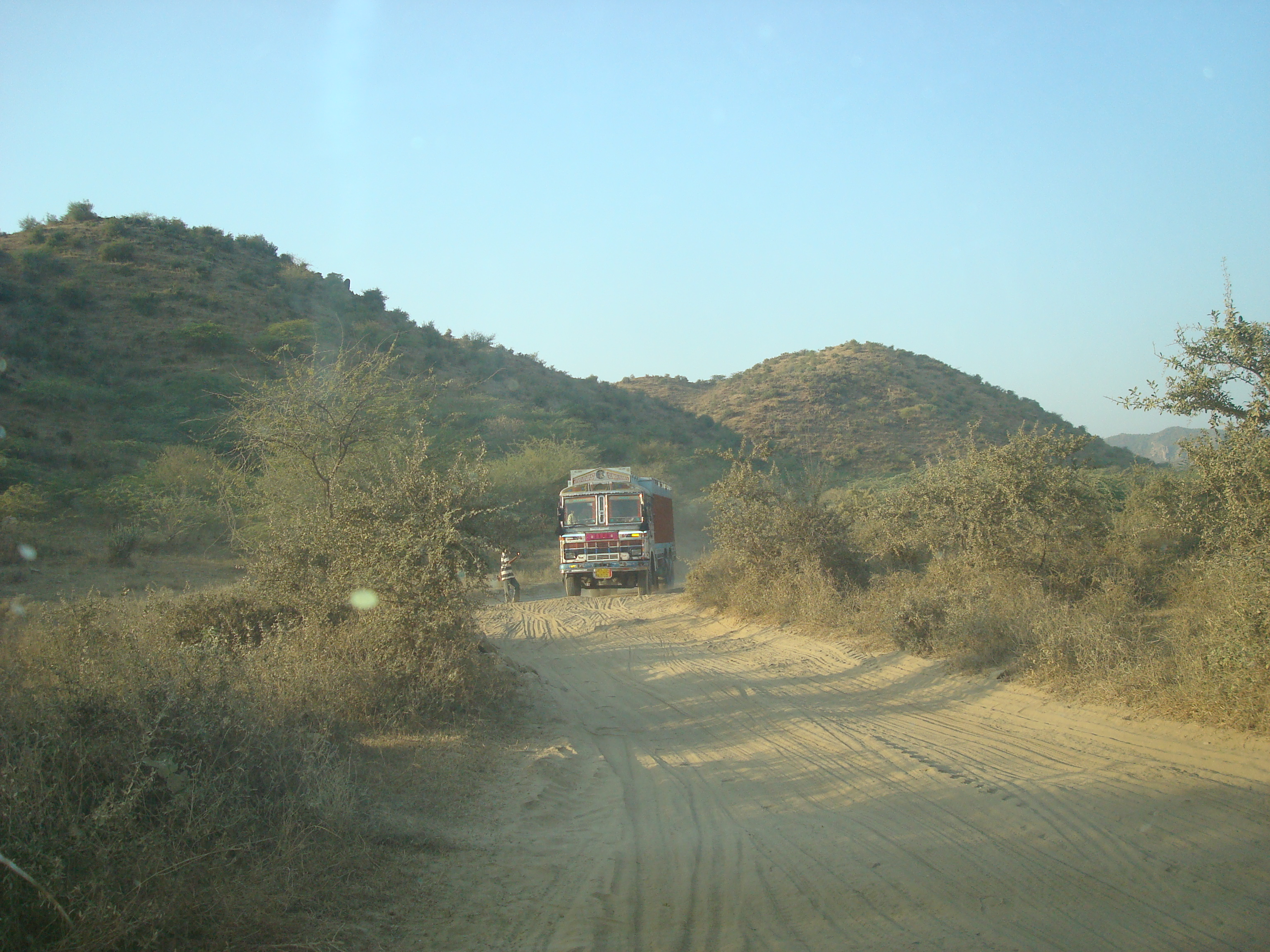

== Route ==
- Dausa
- Lalsot
