= Koira =

Koida Koida
- Town
- Location in Orissa, India
- Coordinates: 21°55′0″N 85°14′0″E
- Country (India): India
- State: Odisha
- District: Sundargarh

Government
  - Type: Municipal Authorities
  - Body: Juel Oram (Central Minister)
- Elevation: 590 m (1,940 ft)

Population (2011)
  - Total: 5,000 (as 2,011)

Languages
  - Official: Odia
- Time zone: UTC+5:30 (IST)
- PIN: 770048
- Vehicle registration: OD 14
- Nearest city: Barbil, Rourkela
- Website: odisha.gov.in

Koira is a Town, Block and tahsil in Sundargarh District, Odisha, India.

== Geography ==
It is located at 21°55′0″N 85°14′0″E at an elevation of 590 m (1,940 ft) above mean sea level.

Koira has abundant deposits of iron ore and manganese ore and many mines operate in the area.

The majority of the population in the town are settled migrants from Khordha, Cuttack, Jajpur, Bhadrak, Uttar Pradesh, Bihar and West Bengal. Dust from the various mining activities is a problem in the town, but precautions have been taken by mining corporations and local authorities to reduce and eradicate the dust.
