= Asurde =

Village in Maharashtra, India

- village
- Location in Maharashtra, India Asurde (India)
- Coordinates: 17°37′12.79″N 73°28′57.82″E
- Country: India
- State: Maharashtra
- District: Ratnagiri

Languages
  - Official: Marathi
- Time zone: UTC+5:30 (IST)

Asurde is a village located in Chiplun sub-district, Ratnagiri district, Maharashtra, India. As of the 2011 Indian Census, it contained 558 households and had a population of 2335 people. It lies on National Highway NH 17.

Neighbouring villages include Sawarde and Aravali.
