= National Highway 61 (India, old numbering) =

Old numbering of road in India

National Highway 61

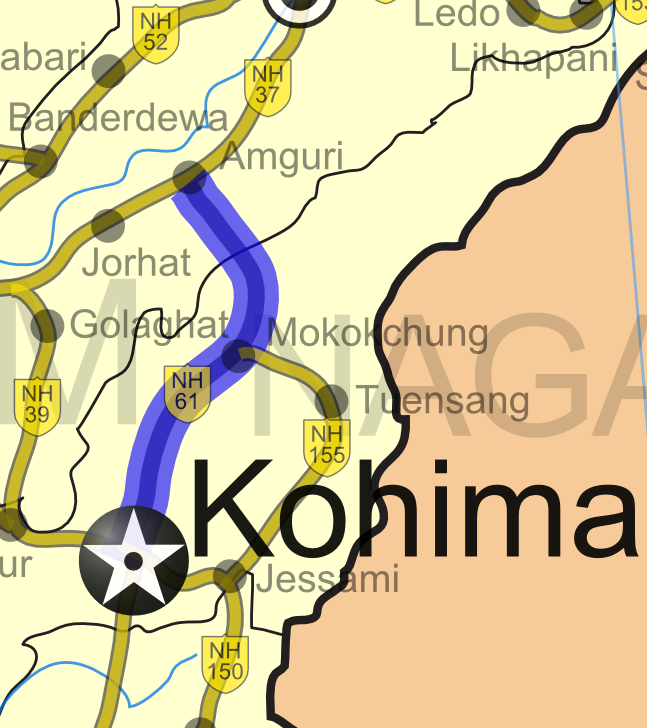
- Road map of India with National Highway 61 highlighted in blue

Route information
- Length: 240 km (150 mi)

Major junctions
- From: Kohima, Nagaland
- To: Jhanji, Assam

Location
- Country: India
- States: Nagaland: 220 km (140 mi); Assam: 20 km (12 mi)
- Primary destinations: Wokha - Mokokchung

Highway system
- Roads in India; Expressways; National; State; Asian
← NH 60A	→ NH 62

National Highway 61 (NH 61) is a National Highway of India. It runs from Kohima, the capital of the state of Nagaland and ends at Jhanji in the state of Assam. The highway is 240 km (150 mi) long, of which 220 km (140 mi) is in Nagaland and 20 km (12 mi) is in Assam. In 2010, the highway was renumbered to form part of present-day NH 2.

== Route ==
- Wokha
- Mokokchung

== See also ==
- List of national highways in India
- National Highways Development Project
