= Belgan =

Belgaon
- Village
- Location in Odisha, India Belgaon (India)
- Coordinates: 20°28′0″N 83°18′0″E
- Country: India
- State: Odisha
- District: Bolangir
- Elevation: 197 m (646 ft)

Languages
  - Official: Odia
- Time zone: UTC+5:30 (IST)
- Vehicle registration: OD-
- Coastline: 0 kilometres (0 mi)
- Website: odisha.gov.in

Belgaon is a village in Bolangir district, Odisha, India.

== Geography ==
It is located at 20°28′0″N 83°18′0″E at an elevation of 197 m from MSL.

== Location ==
National Highway 201 passes through Belgan.
