= National Highway 934 (India) =

National highway in India

National Highway 934
- Map of National Highway 934 in red

Route information
- Length: 156 km (97 mi)

Major junctions
- From: Hirapur
- To: Bina

Location
- Country: India
- States: Madhya Pradesh
- Primary destinations: Shahgarh, Banda, Sagar, Jaruakheda, Khurai

Highway system
- Roads in India; Expressways; National; State; Asian
← NH 734	→ NH 35

National Highway 934 (NH 934) is a National Highway in Madhya Pradesh, India.
