= Simga =

- Town
- Location in Chhattisgarh, India Simga (India)
- Coordinates: 21.63°N 81.7°E
- Country: India
- State: Chhattisgarh
- District: Baloda Bazar
- Elevation: 262 m (860 ft)

Population (2011)
  - Total: 16,027

Languages
  - Official: Hindi, Chhattisgarhi
- Time zone: UTC+5:30 (IST)
- Vehicle registration: CG

Simga is a town and a nagar panchayat in the Baloda Bazar District in the Indian state of Chhattisgarh. It is between Raipur and Bilaspur on the NH 130.

== Geography ==
Simga is located at 21.63°N 81.7°E. It has an average elevation of 262 m (860 ft).

== Demographics ==
As of the 2011 India census, Simga had a population of 16,027. Males constitute 50% of the population and females 50%. Simga has an average literacy rate of 78.53%, higher than the national average of 70.28%: male literacy is 87.77%, and female literacy is 69.41%. In Simga, 15.16% of the population is under 6 years of age.
