= Pirthipur =

Pirthipur Prithvipur
- town
- Location in Madhya Pradesh, India Pirthipur (India)
- Coordinates: 24.1375°N 76.7111°E
- Country: India
- State: Madhya Pradesh
- Named for: Prithvipur

Government
  - Body: Legislative Council of India

Area
  - Total: 2 km^{2} (0.77 sq mi)

Population (2011)
  - Total: 798
  - Density: 400/km^{2} (1,000/sq mi)

Languages
  - Official: Hindi
- Time zone: UTC+5:30 (IST)
- Postal code: 472338
- ISO 3166 code: IN-MP
- Vehicle registration: Mp 71

Pirthīpur or Pirthipur is an inhabited place in the state of Madhya Pradesh, India.
