= National Highway 217 (India) =

National Highway in India

National Highway 217
- Map of National Highway 217 in red

Route information
- Auxiliary route of NH 17
- Length: 352.3 km (218.9 mi)

Major junctions
- West end: Paikan, Assam
- East end: Dudhnoi, Assam

Location
- Country: India
- States: Assam, Meghalaya
- Primary destinations: Dalu, Meghalaya

Highway system
- Roads in India; Expressways; National; State; Asian
← NH 17	→ NH 17

National Highway 217 commonly referred to as NH 217, is a national highway in India. This route was earlier part of old national highways 51 and 62. It is a secondary route of National Highway 17. NH-217 runs through the states of Assam and Meghalaya in India.

== Route ==
NH217 connects Paikan, Tura, Dalu, Baghmara, Rongjeng, Damra and Dudhnoi in the states of Assam and Meghalaya in India.

== Junctions ==
NH 17 Terminal near Paikan.
NH 127B near Tura.
NH 127B near Lower Nengkhra.
NH 17 Terminal near Dudhnoi.

== History ==
In 2021, a new species of gecko was found on the highway, Cyrtodactylus karsticolus.

== See also ==
- List of national highways in India
- List of national highways in India by state
