= National Highway 66 (India, old numbering) =

Old numbering of road in India

National Highway 66

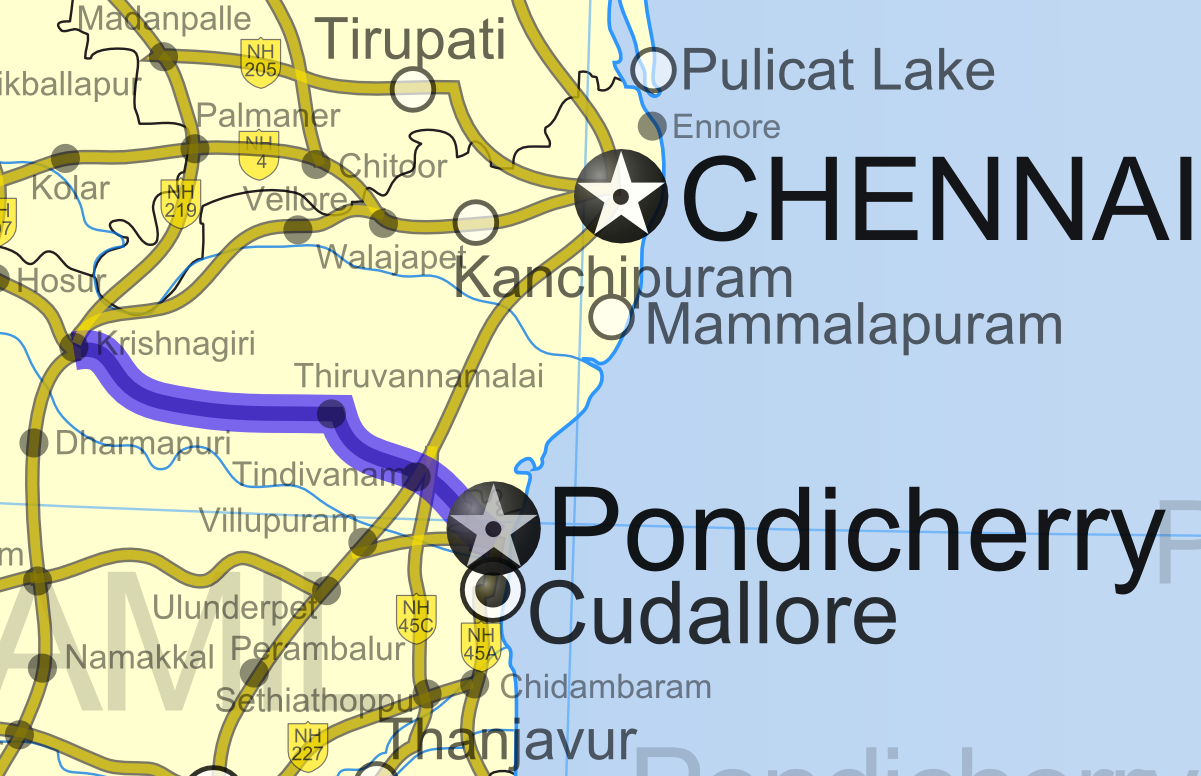

Route information
- Length: 214 km (133 mi)

Major junctions
- From: Pondicherry, Puducherry
- To: Krishnagiri, Tamil Nadu

Location
- Country: India
- States: Tamil Nadu: 210 km (130 mi); Puducherry: 4 km (2.5 mi)
- Primary destinations: Tindivanam Uthangarai

Highway system
- Roads in India; Expressways; National; State; Asian
← NH 65	→ NH 67

National Highway 66 (NH 66) is a National Highway in India. This is the main National Highway to connect Pondicherry with Krishnagiri. It starts from Indira Gandhi Square in Pondicherry and runs north west till Tindivanam in Villupuram district then runs westward till Uthangarai via Thiruvannamalai and then joins NH 46 at Krishnagiri. NH 46 starts from NH 7 which is at 1 km (0.62 mi) from the junction of NH 66. The total length runs to 214 km (133 mi).

The 38.61 km (23.99 mi) distance between Pondicherry and Tindivanam is widened into four lanes by Maytas - NCC Consortium.

== Route ==
Pondicherry - Thiruchitrambalam - Kiliyanur - Tindivanam - Vallam - Gingee - Pennathur - Tiruvannamalai - Pachal - Chengam - Singarapettai - Uthangarai - Samalpatti - Krishnagiri

== See also ==
- List of national highways in India
- National Highways Development Project
