= Sunki =

- Village
- Location in Odisha, India
- Coordinates: 18.5005°N 83.04823°E
- Country: India
- State: Odisha
- District: Koraput

Languages
  - Official: Odia
- Time zone: UTC+5:30 (IST)
- Vehicle registration: OD 10
- Website: odisha.gov.in

Sunki is a village in the Koraput district of the Indian state of Odisha.

== Location ==
It is located at the border between Odisha's Koraput district and Vijayanagaram district, Andhra Pradesh and on the National Highway 43.
