= Naojan =

Naojan Gaon Naojan Gaon
- Town
- Nickname: Naojan Gaon
- Location in Assam, India Naojan Gaon (India)
- Coordinates: 26°7′0″N 93°49′0″E
- Country: India
- State: Assam
- District: Golaghat
- Elevation: 116 m (381 ft)

Languages
  - Official: Assamese
- Time zone: UTC+5:30 (IST)
- PIN: 785601
- Vehicle registration: AS
- Coastline: 0 kilometres (0 mi)

Naojan also known as "Naojan Gaon" is a village under "Paschim Naojan Gram Panchayat", Tehsil Sarupathar, Sub Division Dhansiri of Golaghat District, Assam, India. The village is flourished beside Dhansiri river (world's most Zig-Zag river). Naojan Gaon has a Railway Station and Post Office.

== Geography ==
It is located at an elevation of 113 m above MSL.

== Location ==
National Highway 39 is 6 km away from Naojan Gaon.
