= Mallampalli =

Mallampalli is the family name of some Indians mainly from Andhra Pradesh region:

- Mallampalli surname comes under Aradhya Brahmins caste who worship Lord Shiva deity and his reincarnation Lord Veerabhadra Swamy and Badrakali
- The Aradhya Brahmins are an ancient Vedic sect of Shaivam in Andhra Pradesh. They are initiated into the Shiva Panchakshari Deeksha and wear a shiva lingam on themselves. They followed a very religious and highly disciplined lifestyle!
- Mallampalli Chandrasekhara Rao, better known as Chandra Mohan, Telugu character actor
- Mallampalli Sarabheswara Sarma, better known as Sarabhayya, an Indian poet, critic, translator and a great exponent of classical literature
