= Chhitauni =

Lucknow District Uttar Pradesh Village in Uttar Pradesh, India

- village
- Location in Uttar Pradesh, India Chhitauni (India)
- Coordinates: 27°7′0″N 83°59′0″E
- Country: India
- State: Uttar Pradesh
- District: Kushinagar
- Elevation: 81 m (266 ft)

Languages
  - Official: Hindi
- Time zone: UTC+5:30 (IST)
- PIN: 274801
- Vehicle registration: UP
- Website: up.gov.in

Chhitauni is a nagar panchayat in Kushinagar district of Uttar Pradesh, India. It is located at 27°7′0″N 83°59′0″E at an elevation of 81 m above MSL.
