= Horti =

- village
- Location in Karnataka, India Horti (India)
- Coordinates: 17.17°N 75.96°E
- Country: India
- State: Karnataka
- District: Bijapur
- Talukas: Indi

Population (2001)
  - Total: 7,662

Languages
  - Official: Kannada
- Time zone: UTC+5:30 (IST)
- Website: http://horti-village.blogspot.in/

Horti is a village in the southern state of Karnataka, India. It is located in the Indi taluk of Vijayapur district in Karnataka.

== Demographics ==
As of 2001 India census, Horti had a population of 7662 with 4121 males and 3541 females.

== See also ==
- Bijapur district
- Districts of Karnataka
