= Shihori railway station =

Railway station in Gujarat, India

Shihori

General information
- Location: Umbri, Shihori Banaskantha, Gujarat; India
- Coordinates: 24.0706°N 71.9807°E
- System: Indian Railway Station
- Owner: Ministry of Railways, Indian Railways
- Operator: Western Railway
- Line: Mahesana-Patan-Bhildi line
- Platforms: 1
- Tracks: 2

Construction
- Structure type: Standard (On Ground)
- Parking: No

Other information
- Status: Functioning
- Station code: SIHI
- Zone(s): Western Railway
- Division(s): Ahmedabad
Location
- Location within India Location within Gujarat

Shihori railway station is a station in Banaskantha district, Gujarat, India, in the Ahmedabad division of the Western Railway zone.

Shihori station is 33 km from Patan railway station. One passenger, two express, and two superfast trains halt at the station.
