= Malkapur, Akola =

Malkapur
- Suburb
- Location in Maharashtra, India
- Coordinates: 20.684023°N 77.035704°E
- Country: India
- State: Maharashtra
- District: Akola
- Elevation: 586 m (1,923 ft)

Population (2001)
  - Total: 12,486

Languages
  - Official: Marathi
- Time zone: UTC+5:30 (IST)

Malkapur is a census town in Akola district in the Indian state of Maharashtra.

== Demographics ==
As of 2001 India census, Malkapur had a population of 12,486. Males constitute 51% of the population and females 49%. Malkapur has an average literacy rate of 79%, higher than the national average of 59.5%: male literacy is 84%, and female literacy is 74%. In Malkapur, 12% of the population is under 6 years of age.
