= National Highway 205 (India) =

National highway in India

National Highway 205
- National Highway highlighted in red

Route information
- Auxiliary route of NH 5
- Length: 183 km (114 mi)

Major junctions
- South end: Kharar
- North end: Shimla

Location
- Country: India
- States: Punjab, Himachal Pradesh
- Primary destinations: Ropar, Kiratpur Sahib, Sundernagar

Highway system
- Roads in India; Expressways; National; State; Asian
← NH 5	→ NH 5

National Highway 205 commonly referred to as NH 205, is a highway in India. The highway passes through the Indian states of Himachal Pradesh and Punjab.

== Route ==
The highway starts at Kharar near Chandigarh. It passes through Ropar and Kiratpur Sahib in Punjab and Swarghat, Namhol and Darlaghat in Himachal Pradesh and terminates near Shimla.

== Old NH numbers of new NH 205 ==
After renumbering of all national highways by National Highway Authority of India in 2010, parts of the former NH 21 and NH 88 have been combined with parts of former NH 5 to create the new NH 205.

- Kharar - Swarghat (in Bilaspur district) section of old NH 21.
- Swarghat - Darlaghat (near Solan) section of old NH 88.
- Darlaghat via Nauni (near Solan) - near Shimla section of old NH 5.

== See also ==
- Leh-Manali Highway
- List of national highways in India
- National Highways Development Project
