= Thingsat =

Village in Aizawl district, Mizoram, India

- Village
- Location of Thingsat in Mizoram, India Thingsat (India)
- Coordinates: 24.1978°N 92.9410°E
- Country: India
- State: Mizoram
- District: Aizawl
- Block: Darlawn

Government
  - Body: Village Council

Population (2011)
  - Total: 154

Languages
  - Official: Mizo, Hindi, English
- Time zone: UTC+05:30 (IST)
- PIN: 796111
- Area code: 0389
- Vehicle registration: MZ
- Census village code: 271198

Thingsat is a village in the Darlawn Community Development Block in the Aizawl district, Mizoram, India and the nearest town is Darlawn, located about 50 km away. According to the 2011 Census, Thingsat had a population of 154 people living in 43 households, with a literacy rate of 91.24%.

Thingsat has the postal PIN code 796111. Thingsat is one of the constituent villages of the Sinlung Hills Council and falls under the Sakawrdai south constituency.

== See also ==
- Aizawl
- Aizawl district
