= Penuballi =

- Village
- Location in Telangana, India Penuballi (India)
- Coordinates: 17°12′37″N 80°41′52″E
- Country: India
- State: Telangana
- District: Khammam

Population (2011)
  - Total: 52,841

Languages
  - Official: Telugu
- Time zone: UTC+5:30 (IST)
- PIN: 507302
- Vehicle registration: TS
- Lok Sabha constituency: Khammam
- Vidhan Sabha constituency: Sathupalli
- Website: telangana.gov.in

Penuballi is a village in the Khammam district of Telangana, India. It is the headquarters of Penuballi mandal and falls under Kalluru revenue division.

== Demographics ==
The population of Penuballi village was 8,915.
