= Kharsali =

Kharsali is a small village near Yamunotri Temple in Uttarakhand, India, that hosts the idol of Goddess Yamuna during winters, after it is brought down in a ritual ceremony from the temple, some fifteen hundred feet higher, as it becomes inaccessible after being snowed in. The priests of the Yamunotri Temple hail from this village. The idol is brought down from the temple, a four-mile trek away, during the festival of Diwali (usually in October) with great celebration, and returns to the temple in spring (in April).

Around 1830, the village was painted by Charles Bentley and an engraving by J. Appleton is the subject of a poetical illustration by Letitia Elizabeth Landon, which was published in Fisher's Drawing Room Scrap Book, 1838. This shows a Hindoo temple with the snows of Mount Yamunotri (Jumnoutri) in the background. The Village of Kursalee.
