= Kopela =

Village in Maharashtra

- village
- Location in Maharashtra, India Kopela (India)
- Coordinates: 18.83°N 80.23°E
- Country: India
- State: Maharashtra
- District: Gadchiroli
- Elevation: 127 m (417 ft)

Languages
  - Official: Marathi
- Time zone: UTC+5:30 (IST)

Kopela is a village in the Gadchiroli district of Maharashtra, India.

== Geography ==
Kopela is located at 18.83°N 80.23°E. It has an average elevation of 127 metres (419 feet).

It lies on National highway No 16 between Nizamabad in Andhra Pradesh and Jagdalpur in Chhattisgarh State.

It is on the border of Maharashtra and Chhattisgarh states.
