= Sosanpal =

- town
- Location within Chhattisgarh Location within India
- Coordinates: 19°2′0″N 81°55′0″E
- Country: India
- State: Chhattisgarh
- District: Bastar
- Elevation: 549 m (1,801 ft)

Languages
  - Official: Hindi, Chhattisgarhi
- Time zone: UTC+5:30 (IST)
- Vehicle registration: CG
- Coastline: 0 kilometres (0 mi)

Sosanpal is a town in Bastar district, Chhattisgarh, India.

== Geography ==
It is located at 19°2′0″N 81°55′0″E at an elevation of 549 m above MSL.

== Location ==
Sosanpal is connected to Jagdalpur, which is 14 km away, by National Highway 221. Nearest airport is Raipur Airport. sosanpal me mukhya rup se dekha ja skta dimrapal

== Places of interest ==
- Indravati National Park
- Kanger Ghati National Park
- Chitrakot Waterfalls
