= National Highway 24A (India, old numbering) =

Highway in Uttar Pradesh, India

National Highway 24A

Route information
- Length: 17 km (11 mi)

Major junctions
- From: Bakshi Ka Talab
- To: Chenhat

Location
- Country: India
- States: Uttar Pradesh

Highway system
- Roads in India; Expressways; National; State; Asian
← NH 24	→ NH 24B

National Highway 24A (NH 24A) starts from Bakshi Ka Talab and ends at Chenhat (at the junction with NH 28), both places in the state of Uttar Pradesh. The highway is 17 km (11 mi) long and runs only in the state of Uttar Pradesh.

== See also ==
- List of National Highways in India (by Highway Number)
- List of National Highways in India
- National Highways Development Project
