= Visarwadi =

- town
- Location in Maharashtra, India
- Coordinates: 21°11′N 73°58′E
- Country: India
- State: Maharashtra
- District: Nandurbar

Government
  - Body: Gram Panchayat
- Elevation: 196 m (643 ft)

Languages
  - Official: Marathi
- Time zone: UTC+5:30 (IST)
- Postal code: 425426
- Vehicle registration: MH–39

Visarwadi is a village in the Nandurbar district in Nashik division of Khandesh region of Maharashtra state in India. The Sarpanch of the town is Bakaram Gavit.

The town is located on National Highway No. 6 - protestors blocked the highway for three hours during the Maharashtra's farmers strike of 2017. Common languages used there are Bhili and Marathi. The majority of people from there are traders, government employees or labors. Here has mixed community of Bhil tribals, Marathi, Gujarati, Muslims and Marwadi people.

== Education ==
The Visarwadi Education Society founded the College of Arts in Visarwadi.
