= Tutilawa =

- town
- Location in Jharkhand, India Tutilawa (India)
- Coordinates: 24°2′0″N 85°2′0″E
- Country: India
- State: Jharkhand
- District: Chatra

Government
  - Body: Nagar Palika
- Elevation: 592 m (1,942 ft)

Languages
  - Official: Hindi, Santali
- Time zone: UTC+5:30 (IST)
- Vehicle registration: JH
- Coastline: 0 kilometres (0 mi)
- Website: chatra.nic.in

Tutilawa is a town in Chatra district of Jharkhand, India.

== Geography ==
It is located at an elevation of 592 m above MSL.

== Location ==
National Highway 100 passes through Tutilawa. The nearest airport is Ranchi Airport.

== Tutilawa Fair ==
Tutilawa Mela, started in 1935, is one of the famous cattle fairs of Jharkhand, held on Falgun Poornima.
