= Rajamunda =

- village
- Location in Odisha, India
- Coordinates: 21°52′0″N 84°55′45″E
- Country: India
- State: Odisha
- District: Sundergarh

Languages
  - Official: Odia
- Time zone: UTC+5:30 (IST)
- Vehicle registration: OD 16

Rajamunda is a village in the state of Odisha, India.
