= Hirapur, Uttar Pradesh =

Village in Uttar Pradesh, India

Hirapur is a village in Ambedkar Nagar district, Uttar Pradesh, India. Hirapur is situated 9 kilometres (5.6 mi) east of Tanda Busstand.

There are 5 schools in Hirapur. There is a Bank of Baroda branch in Hirapur.

== See also ==
- Tanda
- Rajesultanpur
- Akbarpur
- Jalalpur
- Baskhari
- Hanswar
