= Hirapur, Balaghat =

Hirapur
- Census town
- Location in Madhya Pradesh, India Hirapur (India)
- Coordinates: 21.53°N 79.77°E
- Country: India
- State: Madhya Pradesh
- District: Balaghat
- Elevation: 501 m (1,644 ft)

Population (2001)
  - Total: 5,639

Languages
  - Official: Hindi
- Time zone: UTC+5:30 (IST)
- ISO 3166 code: IN-MP
- Vehicle registration: MP

Hirapur is a census town in Balaghat district in the Indian state of Madhya Pradesh.

== Geography ==
Hirapur is located at 21.53°N 79.77°E. It has an average elevation of 501 metres (1643 feet).

== Demographics ==
As of 2001 India census, Hirapur had a population of 5,639. Males constitute 50% of the population and females 50%. Hirapur has an average literacy rate of 65%, higher than the national average of 59.5%: male literacy is 73%, and female literacy is 57%. In Hirapur, 15% of the population is under 6 years of age.
