= Parsora =

- village
- Location in Odisha, India Parsora (India)
- Coordinates: 21°57′0″N 85°36′0″E
- Country: India
- State: Odisha
- District: Kendujhar
- Elevation: 386 m (1,266 ft)

Languages
  - Official: Odia
- Time zone: UTC+5:30 (IST)
- Vehicle registration: OD 09
- Website: odisha.gov.in

Parsora is a town in Kendujhar District, Odisha, India.

== Geography ==
It is located at 21°57′0″N 85°36′0″E at an elevation of 386 m above MSL.

== Location ==
National Highway 215 passes through Parsora. Nearest airport is Biju Patnaik Airport at Bhubaneswar.
