= National Highway 146 (India) =

National highway in India

National Highway 146
- Map of the National Highway in red

Route information
- Length: 167.6 km (104.1 mi)

Major junctions
- From: NH-46 near Bhopal
- To: NH-44 near Sagar

Location
- Country: India
- States: Madhya Pradesh

Highway system
- Roads in India; Expressways; National; State; Asian

National Highway 146 (NH 146) is a National Highway in India. This highway is in the state of Madhya Pradesh, running from Bhopal to Sagar. This national highway is 167.6 km (104.1 mi) long. Before renumbering of national highways, NH-146 was numbered as old National Highways 86A (India).

== Route ==
Schematic map of National Highways in India

NH146 connects Bhopal, Raisen, Vidisha, Gyaraspur, Rahatgarh and terminates at Sagar in the state of Madhya Pradesh.

== Junctions ==
NH 46 Terminal near Bhopal
NH 44 Terminal near Sagar

== See also ==
- List of national highways in India
- List of national highways in India by state
