= Lalsot =

- City
- Location in Khatwa, Rajasthan, India Lalsot (India)
- Coordinates: 26.57°N 76.33°E
- Country: India
- State: Rajasthan
- District: Dausa
- Elevation: 298 m (978 ft)

Population (2013)
  - Total: 34,363

Languages
  - Official: English, Hindi
- Time zone: UTC+5:30 (IST)
- PIN: 303503
- Telephone code: 01427
- Vehicle registration: RJ-29

Lalsot is a city with municipality in Dausa district in the Indian state of Rajasthan. Lalsot is the biggest city in Dausa district.

Lalsot Municipality has total administration over 5,756 houses to which it supplies basic amenities like water and sewerage. It is also authorized to build roads within municipality limits and impose taxes on properties coming under its jurisdiction. This place is famous for Grain Mandi in local area.

== History ==
=== Battle of Lalsot ===
Rajputs and Marathas fought a pitched battle in May 1787 called the Battle of Lalsot. The battle ended after three days, with the Rajputs retiring with heavy losses.

== Geography ==
Lalsot is located at 26.57°N 76.33°E. It has an average elevation of 298 metres (978 ft).

== Demographics ==
As of the 2011 India census, Lalsot is a municipality city in district of Dausa, Rajasthan. The city is divided into 25 wards for which elections are held every five years. The Lalsot Municipality has a population of 34,363, of whom 17,816 are males and 16,547 are females as per the report released by Census India 2011.

The population of children age 0-6 is 4986, which is 14.51% of the total population of Lalsot. In Lalsot Municipality, the female sex ratio is of 929 against the state average of 928. The child sex ratio in Lalsot is around 870 compared to the Rajasthan state average of 888. The literacy rate of Lalsot city is 77.04%, higher than the state average of 66.11%. In Lalsot, male literacy is around 88.43% while female literacy is 64.91%.

Hindi is the official language but Dhoondhari is the most common language which is used to communicate.

=== Caste factor ===
Schedule Caste (SC) constitutes 18.59% while Schedule Tribe (ST) were 39.60% of the total population in Lalsot.

=== Work profile ===
Out of the total population, 10,906 were engaged in work or business activity. 8,448 of these were male and 2,458 were female. In the census survey, a worker is defined as person who does business, job, service, and cultivator and labour activity. Of the total 10906 working population, 85.71% were engaged in main work while 14.29% of total workers were engaged in marginal work.

=== Wards ===
The Lalsot city is divided into 35 wards for which elections are held every five years.

== Tourism ==
=== Hella Khyal Sangit Dangal ===
On the Festival of Ganguar Lalsot witnesses "Hella Khyal Sangit Dangal" − a tradition of past 265 years. In this festival Dangal parties continuously perform for 48 hours . Sangit Parties perform the art of music and Tukka songs through which they entertain the public and these songs always contains current affairs and issues, put forth their problems to government officers, or comment on social, political and economic issues. (In old days, religious and folk themes were popular in the public.)

The festival is a major cultural event in Dausa district, drawing large numbers of visitors from across the state. The initial portion of the Dangal performance is dedicated to traditional deities, beginning with a tribute to Ganesha.

lasot is well known of "HELLA KHYAL SANGIT DANGAL". every year is organized by the nagar palika of lalsot in purani anaj mandi lalsot.

=== Lalsot cricket cup ===
It is being organised from past 09 years. Gangaur cricket cup is an initiative of some citizens with sport and educational background . Generally the final match is scheduled for 1 January. According to their organizers and people Indian cricketer Pankaj Singh has played here Khaleel Ahmed also came here, but he was not included in playing 11. The sport ground of Shri Ashok Sharma Senior Secondary School was used for organizing this cup but recently it has changed to lalclub stadium.

=== Temples and religious spots ===
- Shri Paplaj Mata Mandir: the Temple of Paplaj Mata Ji is situated in the sub-district Lalsot. The goddess is worshiped by Hindus. People were coming from several states of India.
- Paankhleshwar Mahadev Mandir: situated in Pankhla Ji ka bagicha.
- Khurra ki Mata: situated near Mandavari Gram. It is the most common temple where thousands of people come from different states of India.
- Byai Mata Ji: Situated between Arawali range and Dhav River.
- Binori Balaji: Situated near Suratpura Dam.
- Ghata Ka Balaji and Bhairon Ji Maharaj: Situated at NH-11A road, at the border of Didwana and Lalsot. It is the starting of the city Lalsot and it is also one of the oldest temples of this city.
- Jobner Jwala Mata Ji: Situated in Didwana village on the mountain
- Shree Bhomiya ji Temple:Situated in lalsot city on the mountain
- Jind Baba: Situated near Lalsot and Khatwa village. There is worship by Sharma, Meena, Gurjar, jangid and Agarwal caste.
- ramsala village didwana historical place (balkhandi balaji tample)
- Aed Jeed Hanuman Ji: Situated between Arawali range near by village dhelal (didwana)
- Bhrammani Mata Ji: Situated in mandawari town. Historical temple of Sakti, kuldevi of meena
- mairdh Kshatriya Sun Temple situated in center of Lalsot City near the old tehsil office.. This Temple made by Sri mairdh Kshatriya SONI cast. That time no history about this temple but a Brahmin priest's residence in the temple and he make a construction like he want.....this sun temple dausa district one and only one sun temple.the original map of this historical place is not available but some knowledge found in govt papers.
