= National Highway 76 (India, old numbering) =

Old numbering of road in India

National Highway 76

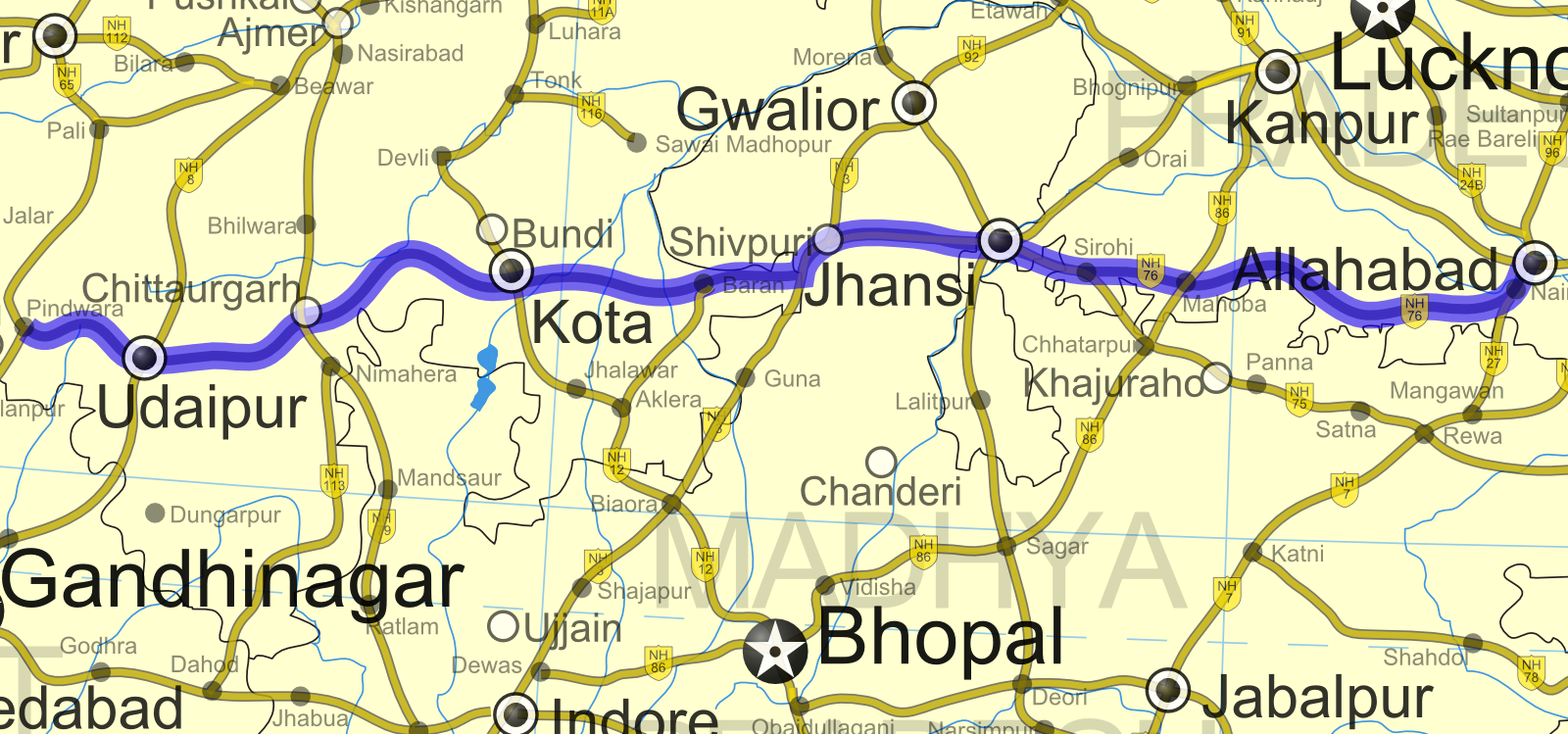
- Road map of India with National Highway 76 highlighted in solid red color

Route information
- Length: 1,007 km (626 mi) GQ: 108 km (Udaipur - Chittaurgarh); E-W: 500 km (Pindwara - Jhansi)

Major junctions
- West end: Pindwara, Rajasthan
- Jhansi, Harpalpur, Panwari, Kulpahar, Mahoba, Kabrai and Banda
- East end: NH 27 south of Allahabad

Location
- Country: India
- States: Rajasthan: 480 km (300 mi); Madhya Pradesh: 60 km (37 mi); Uttar Pradesh: 467 km (290 mi)
- Primary destinations: Pindwara - Udaipur - Chittaurgarh - Kota - Shivpuri - KARERA - Jhansi - Banda - Allahabad

Highway system
- Roads in India; Expressways; National; State; Asian
| ← NH 75 | → NH 77 |

National Highway 76 or NH 76 is a National Highway in India that links Allahabad in Uttar Pradesh with Pindwara in Rajasthan. This 1,007-kilometre-long (626 mi) highway passes through Udaipur, Kota, Shivpuri, Jhansi and Banda.

Of its total length, the National Highway 76 traverses 467 km (290 mi)in Uttar Pradesh, 60 km (37 mi) Madhya Pradesh and 480 km (300 mi) in Rajasthan.

In 2010, the highway was renumbered to form various sections of these present-day highways:

- NH 27 between Pindwara and Jhansi
- NH 39 between Jhansi and Chhatipahadi
- NH 34 between Mahoba and Kabrai
- NH 35 between Kabrai and Prayagraj

== National Highways Development Project ==
- Approximately 108 km (67 mi) stretch of NH 76 between Udaipur and Chittaurgarh has been selected as a part of the Golden Quadrilateral by the National Highways Development Project.
- Approximately 500 km (310 mi) stretch of NH 76 between Pindwara and Jhansi has been selected as a part of the East-West Corridor by the National Highways Development Project.

== National Highway 76 extension ==
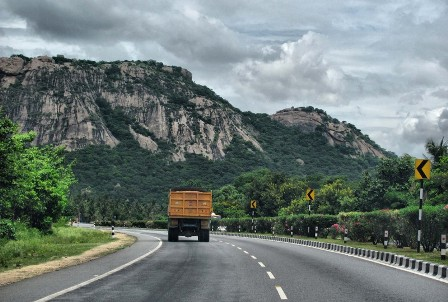
National Highway 76

National Highway 76 has an extension of 90 km (56 mi), deviated 19 km (12 mi) before Allahabad. It is called NH 76 Extn., route being 19 km (12 mi) of NH 76 to Mirzapur. Some of the road passes through small hills. An important point to note while travelling via this Highway is that traffic is very sparse (specially between Udaipur-Shivpuri) and you do not find any motels or roadside dhabas.

== See also ==
- List of national highways in India
- National Highways Development Project
