= National Highway 539 (India) =

National highway in India

National Highway 539
- Map of National Highway 539 in red

Route information
- Length: 173 km (107 mi)

Major junctions
- From: Jhansi
- To: Shahgarh

Location
- Country: India
- Primary destinations: Prithvipur – Tikamgarh

Highway system
- Roads in India; Expressways; National; State; Asian
← NH 39	→ NH 934

National Highway 539 (NH 539) is a National Highway in India (Bharat).
