= Monoharpur =

- Village
- Location in West Bengal, India Monoharpur (India)
- Coordinates: 22.68°N 88.30°E
- Country: India
- State: West Bengal
- District: Hooghly

Population (2011)
  - Total: 20,825

Languages
  - Official: Bengali, English
- Time zone: UTC+5:30 (IST)
- PIN: 712410
- Vehicle registration: WB
- Website: wb.gov.in

Monoharpur is a village in Chanditala II CD Block in Srirampore subdivision of Hooghly district in the state of West Bengal, India. It was earlier recorded as a census town.

== Geography ==
Manoharpur is located at 22.68°N 88.30°E.

== Demographics ==
As of 2001 India census, Manoharpur had a population of 20,825. Males constituted 53% of the population and females 47%. Manoharpur had an average literacy rate of 72%, higher than the national average at the time (59.5%): male literacy was 75%, and female literacy is 69%. In Manoharpur, 11% of the population was under 6 years of age.
