= Swarghat =

- Stopover
- Location in Himachal Pradesh, India Swarghat (India)
- Coordinates: 31.33°N 76.75°E
- Country: India
- State: Himachal Pradesh
- District: Bilaspur
- Elevation: 1,220 m (4,000 ft)

Languages
  - Official: Hindi
- Time zone: UTC+5:30 (IST)
- Website: [ www.himachaltourism.gov.in%20himachaltourism.gov.in]]

Swarghat is a stopover destination on the Chandigarh-Manali Highway in the Bilaspur district of Himachal Pradesh, Northern India.

== General information ==
- Climate:- Mild winters and pleasant summers.
- Height:- 1220m.
- Time to visit:- Throughout the year.

== Getting there ==
- By Road:- From Chandigarh (through Ropar) it is 90 km away. From Shimla it is 124 km and from Bilaspur 40 km.
- By Rail:- Kiratpur (nearest railhead), it is about 20 km away.
- By Air:- Nearest airport from Swarghat is at Chandigarh.

== Attractions ==
- hotel hill top(0 km)
- Nalagarh Fort (4.5 km)
- Bhimakali temple (6 km)
- Naina Devi temple (20 km)
- Bhakra (37 km)

== See also ==
- List of national highways in India
