= Dalu, Meghalaya =

Dalu
- town
- Location in Meghalaya, India Dalu (India)
- Coordinates: 25°13′50″N 90°12′40″E
- Country: India
- State: Meghalaya
- District: West Garo Hills

Government
  - Type: Democracy
  - Body: Congress
- Elevation: 16 m (52 ft)

Languages
  - Official: English
- Time zone: UTC+5:30 (IST)
- Vehicle registration: ML
- Coastline: 0 kilometres (0 mi)
- Climate: Am

Dalu is a village in West Garo Hills district, Meghalaya, India famous for coal export in North East India.

== Location ==
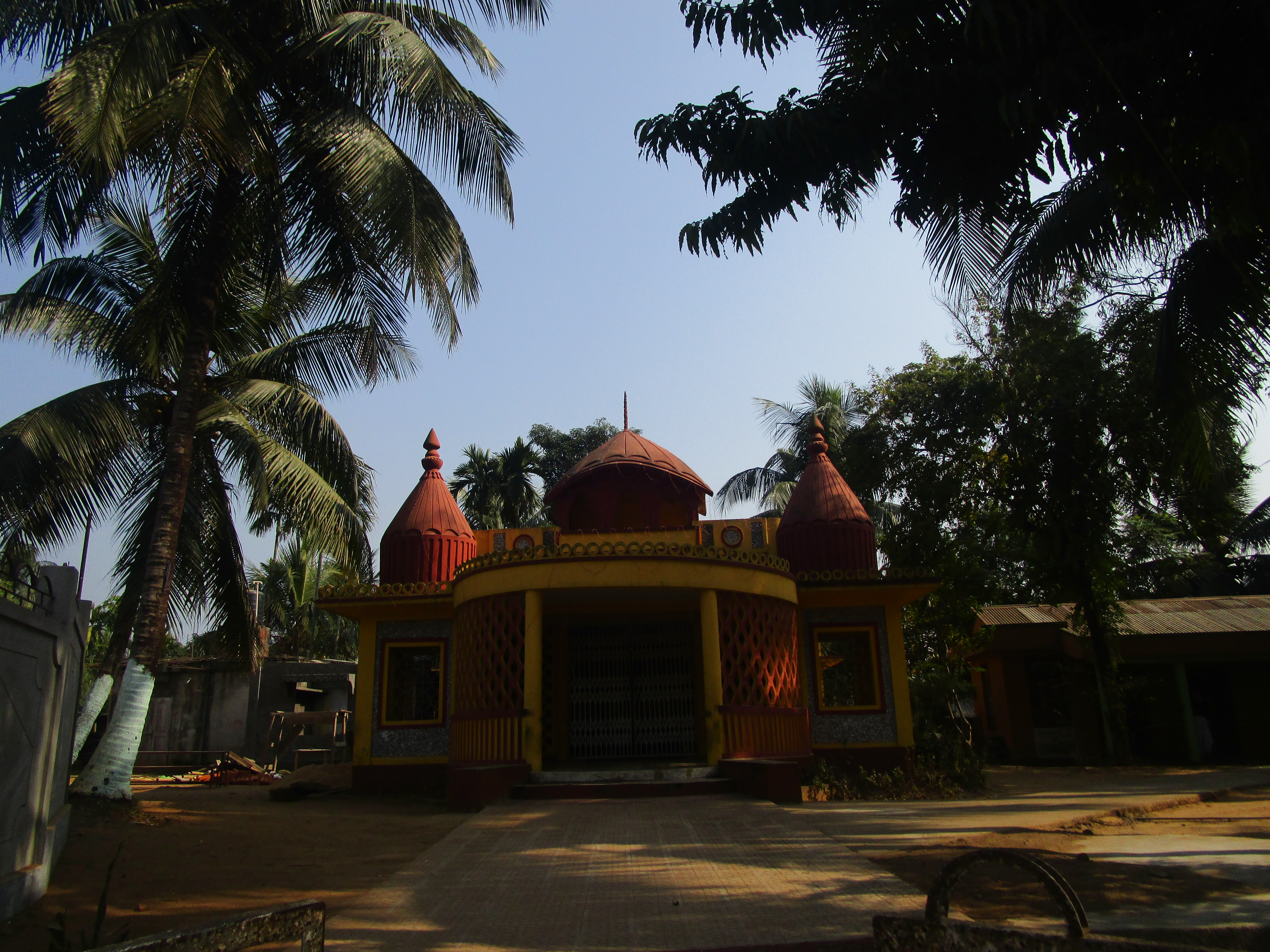
Dalu Mandir

National Highway 51 and National Highway 62 ends at Dalu. Nearest airport is Baljek Airport Baljek, 33 km (21 mi) North-east of Tura in Meghalaya, India.
