= National Highway 6 (India, old numbering) =

Old numbering of road in India

National Highway 6
- GE Road (Great Eastern Road)
- Map of Old National Highway 6 in red
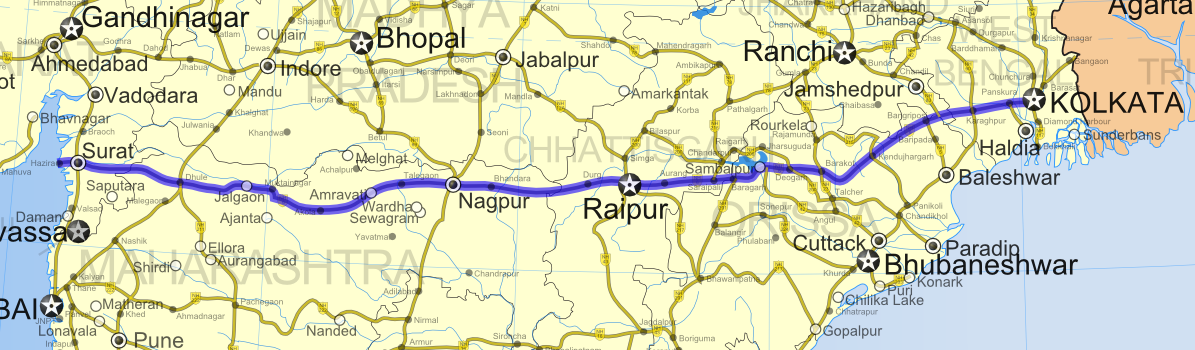
- Road map of Old National Highway 6 highlighted in solid blue color

Route information
- Part of AH45 AH46
- Length: 2,002 km (1,244 mi) GQ: 117 km (73 mi) (Kolkata - Kharagpur); Phase III: 358 km (222 mi)

Major junctions
- West end: Hajira, Gujarat
- East end: Kolkata, West Bengal

Location
- Country: India
- States: Gujarat: 196 km (122 mi); Maharashtra: 814 km (506 mi); Chhattisgarh: 367 km (228 mi); Odisha: 429 km (267 mi); Jharkhand: 27 km (17 mi); West Bengal: 169 km (105 mi)
- Primary destinations: Surat - Dhule - Jalgaon - Bhusawal -Khamgaon- Akola - Amravati - Nagpur - Bhandara - Gondia - Amgaon - Dongargarh - Rajnandgaon - Durg - Raipur - Mahasamund - Bargarh-Sambalpur - Baharagora - Kolkata

Highway system
- Roads in India; Expressways; National; State; Asian
← NH 5A	→ NH 7

National Highway 6 & Economic Corridor 1 (EC1) (commonly referred to as NH6), was a National Highway in India that has been separately designated under the new national highway numbering system. It was officially listed as running over 2,002 km (1,244 mi) from Surat to Kolkata. The route was also known as Asian Highway 46 (AH46) & Mumbai - Kolkata Highway and Great Eastern Highway.

NH6 ran through Gujarat, Maharashtra, Chhattisgarh, Odisha, Jharkhand and West Bengal state in India. The highway passed through the cities of Surat, Dhule, Jalgaon, Bhusaval, Khamgaon, Akola, Amravati, Nagpur, Bhandara, Gondia, Amgaon, Dongargarh, Rajnandgaon, Durg, Raipur, Mahasamund, Bargarh, Sambalpur, Kharagpur, Kolkata.

== History ==
Historically, the 132 kilometres (82 mi) route from Bangriposi to Gopiballavpur via Baripada was constructed before the 18th century by James Rennell Sahib in 1776. It is still known as Old Kolkata-Mumbai Road prior to 1999 period & it used to go via Kharagpur, Jhargram, Chilkigarh, Chichra, Gopiballavpur, Kandnashol, Murgabadi, near Baripada, Bhajpur Chowk in Bhanjpur, Gangraj, Kalabadia, Pathuri to Bangriposi. In 1999-2002 period, the 97.5 kilometres (60.6 mi) long Baharagora-Bangriposi Highway via Jharpokharia was constructed & the traffic of Old Mumbai Road shifted on that new stretch. Then Old Mumbai Road lost its importance and NH-6 (Now NH49) became an important route.

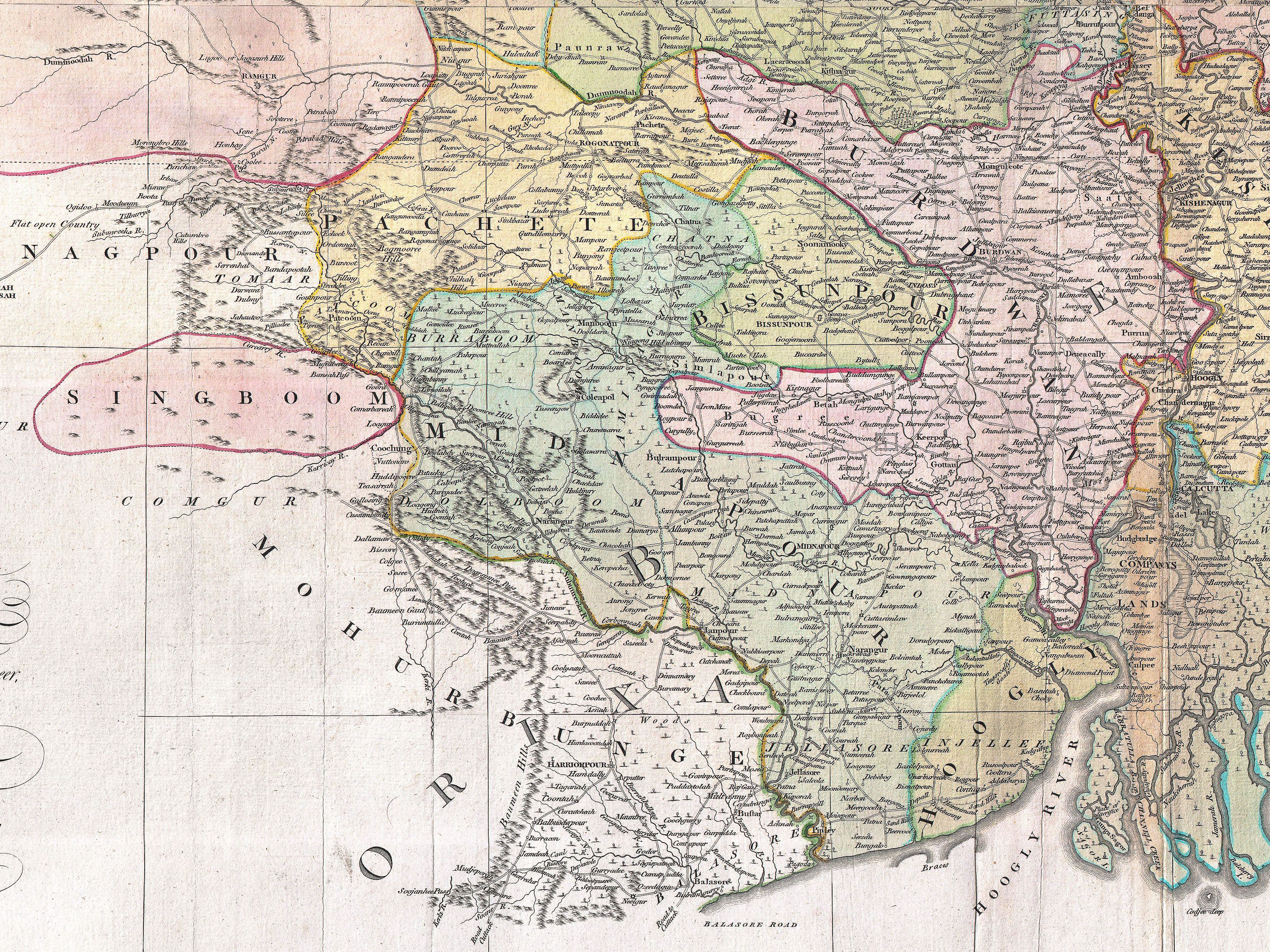
James Rennell's 1776 map showing the political boundaries and route network of lower Bengal

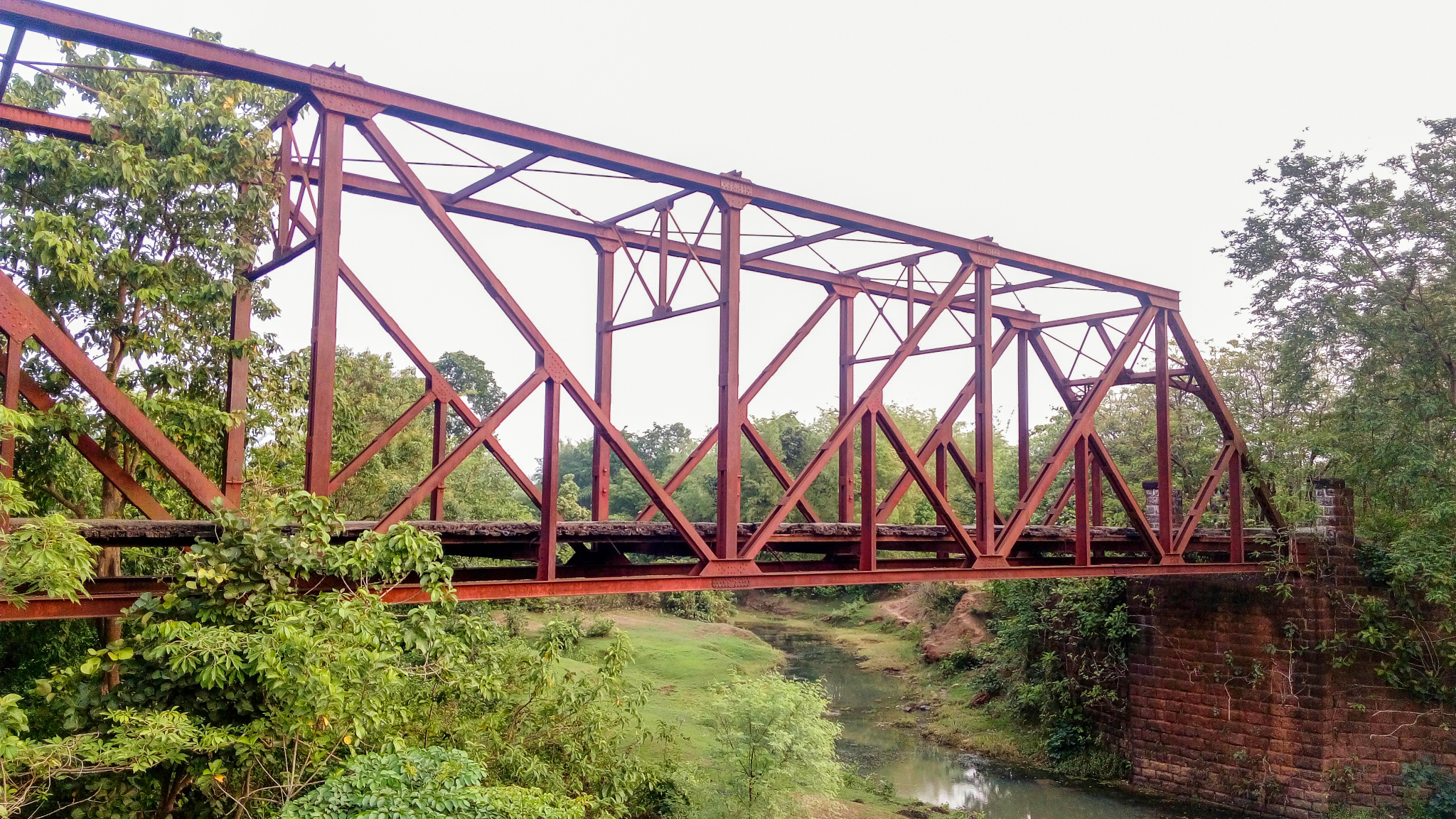
Defunct Naupal Iron Bridge in Mayurbhanj

== New numbering ==
As of 2010 notification from Ministry of Road Transport and Highways, old NH 6 has been renumbered as follows.

- Hajira - Pal Lahara section is part of new National Highway No. 53
- Deogarh - Kharagpur section is part of new National Highway No. 49
- Kharagpur - Kolaghat - Kolkata section is part of new National Highway No. 16(Kolkata-Chennai Road)
- Rajnandgaon - Nagpur Stretch is diverted & Dongargarh & Gondia now doesn't fall on NH53.

== Ghat Sections ==
This route is One of the incomplete Highways of India due to presence of numerous ghat sections between Bangriposi & Sambalpur, crossing mountain & hill ranges of Odisha, Ghats Between Nagpur To Amravati Near Talegaon Village, Karanja (Ghadge), District Wardha in Maharashtra.

- Bamanghati between Bangriposi - Jashpur.
- Keonjharghati between Keonjhar & Kanjipani.
- Kanjipani Ghats between Kanjipani & Deogarh
- Ushakoti Ghats between Deogarh & Sambalpur
- Hazara Ghats between Amgaon & Dongargarh(Stretch of NH6 got excluded from NH53 in 2010)
- Baghnadi Ghats between Rajnandgaon & Deori
- Talegaon Ghats between Nagpur & Amravati

== Junctions ==
- At Palsana, Gujarat Near Surat with NH 8 connecting Delhi - Jaipur - Ahmedabad - Mumbai
- At Dhule with NH 3 connecting Agra - Indore - Mumbai
- At Dhule with NH 211 connecting Solapur - Aurangabad - Dhule
- At Akola with NH 161 connecting Akola - Nanded - Sangareddy - Hyderabad
- At Akola with NH 161A connecting Akot - Akola - Digras - Mudkhed - Nanded -
- At Nagpur with National Highway 7 (India, old numbering) connecting Varanasi - Jabalpur - Nagpur - Hyderabad - Bangalore - Kanyakumari
- At Nagpur with NH 69 connecting Nagpur - Betul - Obedullaganj near Bhopal
- At Raipur with NH 43 connecting Raipur - Jagdalpur - Borigumma - Koraput - Salur - Vizianagaram on NH 5
- At Raipur with NH 200 connecting Raipur - Bilaspur - Raigarh - Deogarh- Talcher - Chandikhol
- At Raipur with NH 217 connecting Raipur - Titlagarh - Asika - Gopalpur
- At Bargarh with NH 201 connecting Borigumma on NH 43 - Bhawanipatna - Balangir - Bargarh
- At Sambalpur with NH 42 connecting Sambalpur - Angul - Dhenkanal - Cuttack on NH 5
- Near Deogarh with NH 200 ( for Second time ) connecting Raipur - Bilaspur - Raigarh - Deogarh - Talcher - Chandikhol on NH 5
- Near Barkote with NH 23 connecting Chas on NH 32 - Ranchi - Raurkela - Barkote - Pal Lahara - Talcher - Nauhata on NH 42
- At Pal Lahara with NH 23 connecting Chas on NH 32 - Ranchi - Raurkela - Barkote - Pal Lahara - Talcher - Nauhata on NH 42
- At Kendujhargarh with NH 215 connecting Panikoili - Anandapur - Kendujhargarh - Rajamunda on NH 23
- At Jharpokharia with NH 5 connectioning Jharpokharia - Cuttack - Vijayawada - Chennai
- At Baharagora with NH 33 connecting Baharagora - Jamshedpur - Ranchi - Hazaribag - Barhi on NH 2
- At Kharagpur with NH 60 connecting Balasore on NH 5 - Jaleswar - Kharagpur - Bankura - Raniganj - junction with NH 2
- At Kolaghat with NH 41 connecting Tamluk - Haldia
- At Bally 15 km from Kolkata with NH 2 connecting Bally - Varanasi - Kanpur - Delhi
- At Kona 8 km from Kolkata with National Highway 117 connecting Kona - Vidyasagar Setu - Kolkata - Diamond Harbour - Bakkhali

=== Asian Highway ===
This highway crossed the AH47 at Dhule and Asian Highway 43 at Nagpur.

== States, districts, cities, towns and villages connected ==
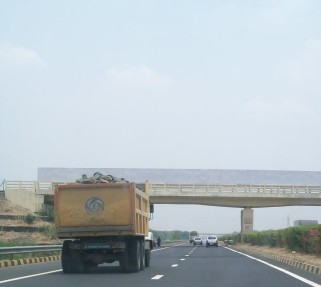
NH 6

Many cities and towns in various districts in the States of Gujarat, Maharashtra, Chhattisgarh, Odisha, Jharkhand and West Bengal were connected by National Highway 6.

=== Gujarat ===
- Surat district
  - Hazira - Surat - Sachin, Gujarat - Palsana - Bardoli
- Tapi district
  - Bajipura - Vyara - Songadh

=== Maharashtra ===
- Nandurbar District
  - Navapur - Visarwadi - Kondaibari
- Dhule District
  - Dahivel - Sakri - Shevali - Ner Dhule - Kusumba - Dhule - Phagne - Mukati
- Jalgaon District
  - Parola - - Erandol - Paldhi - Varad - Jalgaon- Nashirabad - Bhusawal - Varangaon - Muktainagar
- Buldhana District
  - Chikhali - Malkapur - Wadner - Nandura - Khamgaon
- Akola District
  - Balapur - Akola - BorgaonManju - Kurankhed - Murtajapur
- Amravati District
  - Loni - Badnera - Amravati - Kholapur - Nandgaon Peth - Mozri - Tiwsa
- Wardha District
  - Talegaon Shyamji Pant - Karanja
- Nagpur District
  - Kondhali - Bazargaon - Nagpur - Itwari - Mouda
- Bhandara District
  - Bhandara - Warthi - Khapa - Tumsar(Now is NH543K)
- Gondia District
  - Dewhadi - Bisri - Tirora - Gondia - Amgaon - Kawarabandh - Salekasa -Darekasa (Now is NH753 & NH543)

=== Chhattisgarh ===
- Rajnandgaon District
  - Bortalawo - Paniyaab - Dongargarh - Belgaon - Musra - Sukul Daihan - Dharamapur - Gaurinagar - Chikhali - Rajnandgaon(Now is NH553)
- Durg District
  - Durg - Bhilai
- Raipur District
  - Raipur - Arang
- Mahasamund District
  - Mahasamund - Pithora - Sankra - Basna - Saraipali - Singhora

=== Odisha ===
- Bargarh District
  - Loharachatti - Sohela - Bargarh - Attabira godhbhaga
- Sambalpur District
  - Burla - Sambalpur - Ushakothi - Jamankira
- Debagarh District

Deogarh - Balam - Barkote

- Angul District
  - Pal Lahara
- Kendujhargarh District
  - Govindpur - Kuanr - Kendujhargarh
- Mayurbhanj District
  - Jashipur - Manda - Bangriposi - Jharpokharia

=== Jharkhand ===
- East Singhbhum District
  - Baharagora

=== West Bengal ===
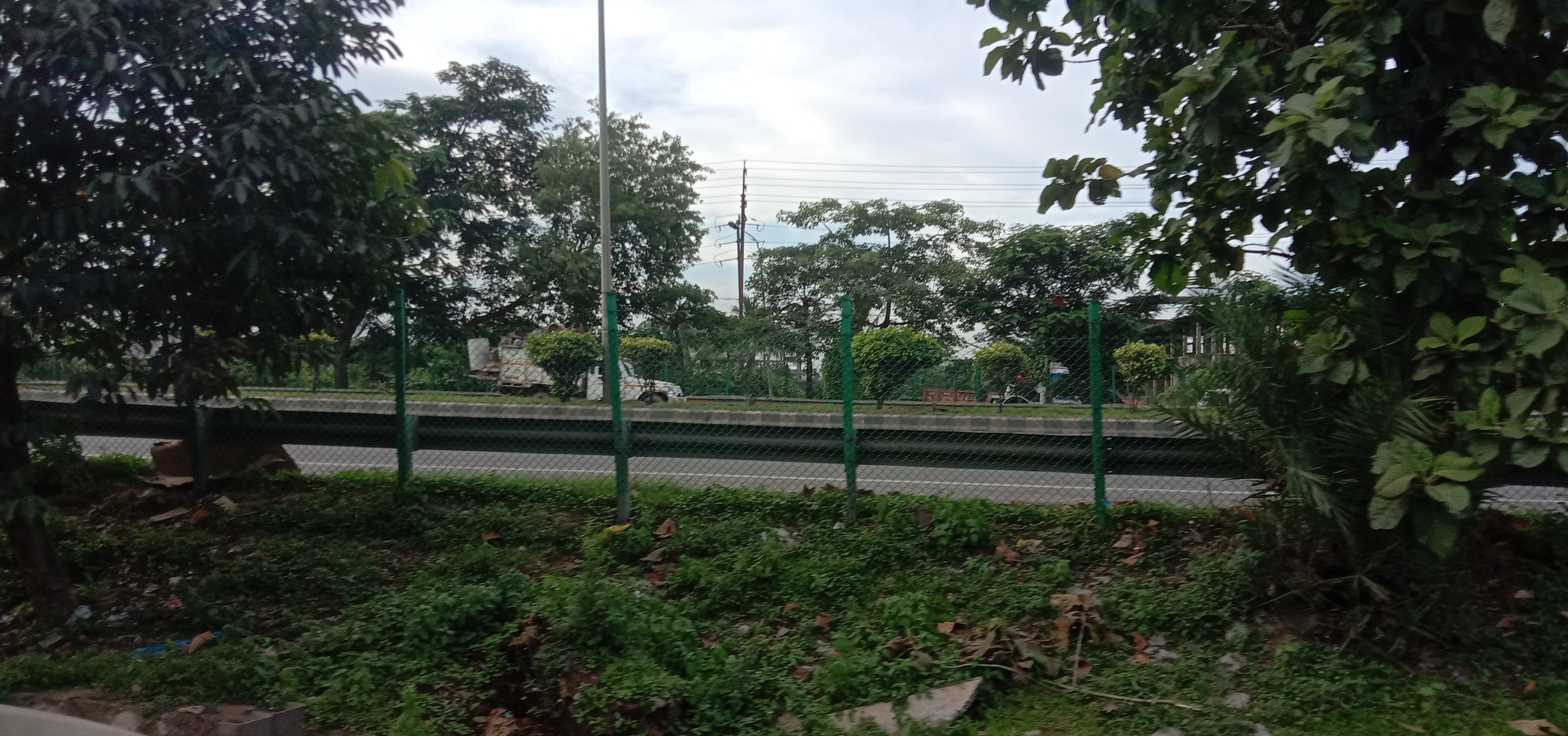
A view of National Highway No. 6, with trees, near Dakshineswar.

- Paschim Medinipur District
  - Jhargram(Chichira - Feko - Lodhashuli - Manikpara) - Kharagpur - Debra
- Purba Medinipur District
  - Panskura - Kolaghat
- Howrah District
  - Samta - Bagnan - Uluberia - Panchla - Mahiari - Jagacha - Howrah
- Kolkata District
  - Kolkata

== Widening and shortening ==
To shorten distance of National Highway 6, 4 lane wide Tatanagar - Rourkela Expressway is planned. This 169 kilometres (105 mi) long expressway will reduce travel time Kolkata & Sambalpur. Currently Kolkata to Sambalpur by road takes 12 hours 30 mins to cover 576 kilometres (358 mi). The Tatanagar - Rourkela Expressway will increase Kolkata to Sambalpur distance to 631 kilometres (392 mi), but will reduce 1 hour 15 minute travel time.

== Trivia ==
- The stretch between Barkote and Pal Lahara was common between NH6 and NH 23
- NH 200 crossed NH6 at two locations: one at its starting point at Raipur and second at Deogarh
- Deogarh-Palasama-Budhapal-Angul Road was originally part of NH53. But pressure from politics made Deogarh Reamal-Rengali Dam Road part of NH53 now.
- Tileibani-Pallahara section is combined with both NH49 & NH53.
- This Highways runs through 10 major forests & Wildlife sanctuaries.
- Accident involving Elephants & other Wildlife with Vehicles are notoriously common in Forest & Ghat sections.

== See also ==
- List of national highways in India
