= Hetkhamar =

Coordinates: 21°27′N 84°32′E

Hetkhamar is a village in Debagarh district, Odisha, about 35 kilometers from the district headquarters Debagarh.

== Geography ==
The village is located south of the Asian Highway 46, near the Gohira Dam, and north of the Deogarh Forest Range.

== Demography ==
The total population of the village was approximately 700 in the 2011 census.

== Education ==
The village has a primary school.

== Festivals and culture ==
The village celebrates an annual festival on the eve of Bali Jatra, followed by Kartik Purnima. Holi, New year, and Raja are the other significant festivals organised in the village.
