= Aahi =

- Village
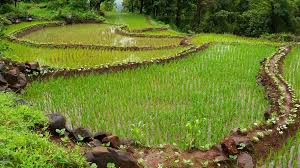
- Aasnap of village

- Location in Uttar Pradesh, India Aahi (India)
- Coordinates: 25.221°N 82.792°E
- Country: India
- State: Uttar Pradesh
- District: Mirzapur

Government
  - Body: Gram panchayat

Population
  - Total: 4,936

Languages
  - Official: Hindi
- Time zone: UTC+5:30 (IST)
- PIN: 231314
- Vehicle registration: UP-63

Aahi is a village in Mirzapur district of Uttar Pradesh state. It is the headquarter of Aahi gram panchayat. It comes under Majhawa assembly constituency and Mirzapur Lok Sabha constituency area. Jamua Bazar is the postal office of this village and Kachhwa is the police station. According to Census 2011, its population is 4936. The literacy of the village is 65%. It is situated at border of Mirzapur and Varanasi District.Even though it is in Mirzapur district but it is painted in the manner locality Banarasi culture. Nearby village is Jamua Bazar (1 km), Narayanpur(2 km), Jakhini(5 km), PM Modi adopted village Jayapur (3 km) under Sansad Adarsh Gram Yojana.

Its distance from Mirzapur district headquarters is 30 km and it is 25 km from Varanasi Junction and 291 km from the State capital Lucknow. The major portion of this village consists of agricultural land which is used for multiple cropping in a year. Aahi village is very close to river Ganges and hence land is very fertile. Majority of village population is engaged in agriculture for their livelihood.

== Education ==
There are three government primary and junior high schools and one private intermediate college named Late Jatadhari Memorial Intermediate College. The two technical and vocational college are Chhatrapati Shivaji ITI and another is Akshaiwar ITI approved by the Government of Uttar Pradesh.

== Famous Personalities ==
Ram Prakash Verma belonging to this village became the first person to join prestigious Indian Administrative Service. He is a 2018 batch IAS officer of Rajasthan cadre.

== Transport facility ==
Aahi Village is connected by road and railway. It is at side of state highway that link to Varanasi District to Mirzapur District. Jamua Bazar is nearest bus stop of major government city roadways buses and private transport that run frequently. The nearest railway station is Baherwa Halt where only passenger and local trains halt, for journey to long distances commuters need to go Varanasi Junction.
