= List of districts of Odisha =

Districts of Indian state of Odisha

Districts of Odisha
- Administrative Map of Odisha
- Category: Districts
- Location: Odisha
- Number: 30 districts
- Populations: Debagada – 312,520 (lowest); Ganjam – 3,529,031 (highest)
- Areas: Mayurbhanj – 10,418 km^{2} (4,022 sq mi) (largest); Jagatsinghpur – 1,759 km^{2} (679 sq mi) (smallest)
- Government: Government of Odisha
- Subdivisions: Sub-Divisions, Tahsils

Odisha, a state on the eastern coast of India, is divided into 30 administrative geographical units called districts. These 30 districts have been placed under three different revenue divisions to streamline their governance. The divisions are Central, North, and South with their headquarters at Kataka, Sambalpur, and Brahmapur respectively. Odisha has 3 divisions, 30 districts, 58 sub-divisions, 317 Tahsils and 314 Blocks.

== History ==
The administrative geography of Odisha was established through three major historical milestones: the creation of a linguistically separate British province on 1 April 1936 under the Government of India Act 1935, the integration of 25 tributary princely states (Garhjats) between 1948 and 1949, and a state-wide administrative decentralization initiative executed between October 1992 and January 1994.

=== Chronology ===
The table below tracks the precise timeline, territorial origin, and individual princely state inclusions for every district established in Odisha since 1936.

Year	Date	Action Type	Resulting District	Parent Territory and Specific Garhjat Inclusions
1936	1 April	Provincial Founding	Cuttack	Coastal Cuttack Division detached from the Bihar and Orissa Province.
1936	1 April	Provincial Founding	Puri	Coastal Puri Division detached from the Bihar and Orissa Province.
1936	1 April	Provincial Founding	Balasore	Coastal Balasore Division detached from the Bihar and Orissa Province.
1936	1 April	Provincial Founding	Sambalpur	Sambalpur Division, previously transferred from the Central Provinces in 1905.
1936	1 April	Provincial Founding	Ganjam	Northern taluks detached from the Madras Presidency.
1936	1 April	Provincial Founding	Koraput	Jeypore Zamindari and hill agency tracts detached from the Vizagapatam district of the Madras Presidency.
1949	1 January	Princely Integration	Mayurbhanj	Integrated as an intact, standalone district from the single large Bhanja princely state of Mayurbhanj.
1949	1 November	Princely Integration	Balangir	Consolidated via the merger of Patna State and Sonepur State.
1949	1 November	Princely Integration	Dhenkanal	Consolidated from the merger of six distinct Gadajata princely states: Dhenkanal, Talcher, Hindol, Athmallik, Athgarh, and Tigiria.
1949	1 November	Princely Integration	Kalahandi	Established by merging Kalahandi State (Karond) with the Nuapada subdivision.
1949	1 November	Princely Integration	Keonjhar	Established directly within the territorial boundaries of the former Keonjhar princely state.
1949	1 November	Princely Integration	Phulbani	Formed by integrating Baudh State with the legacy British-administered Khondmals and Baliguda agency tracts.
1949	1 November	Princely Integration	Sundargarh	Consolidated from the merger of two major western Garhjat princely states: Gangpur State and Bonai State.
1992	2 October	Decentralization Split	Gajapati	Paralakhemundi subdivision was partitioned from Ganjam district.
1992	2 October	Decentralization Split	Malkangiri	Malkangiri subdivision partitioned from the southern limits of Koraput district.
1992	2 October	Decentralization Split	Nabarangpur	Nabarangpur subdivision partitioned from the northern high-plateau plains of Koraput district.
1992	2 October	Decentralization Split	Rayagada	Rayagada and Gunupur subdivisions partitioned from the eastern tribal hill tracts of Koraput district.
1993	1 April	Decentralization Split	Angul	Angul, Talcher, and Pallahara subdivisions partitioned from Dhenkanal district.
1993	1 April	Decentralization Split	Bargarh	Bargarh and Padampur subdivisions partitioned from Sambalpur district.
1993	1 April	Decentralization Split	Bhadrak	Bhadrak subdivision partitioned from the northern coastal plains of Balasore district.
1993	1 April	Decentralization Split	Boudh	Boudh subdivision partitioned from Phulbani district, severing the historic 1949 integration tract.
1993	1 April	Decentralization Split	Jagatsinghpur	Jagatsinghpur subdivision partitioned from the Mahanadi delta zone of Cuttack district.
1993	1 April	Decentralization Split	Jajpur	Jajpur subdivision partitioned from the northern administrative limits of Cuttack district.
1993	1 April	Decentralization Split	Kendrapara	Kendrapara subdivision partitioned from the maritime delta limits of Cuttack district.
1993	1 April	Decentralization Split	Khordha	Khurda and Bhubaneswar subdivisions partitioned from Puri district.
1993	1 April	Decentralization Split	Nayagarh	Nayagarh, Khandpara, Daspalla, and Ranpur subdivisions partitioned from Puri district.
1993	1 April	Decentralization Split	Nuapada	Nuapada subdivision partitioned from the western plateau boundaries of Kalahandi district.
1993	1 April	Decentralization Split	Subarnapur	Sonepur subdivision partitioned from the northeastern administrative lines of Balangir district.
1994	1 January	Decentralization Split	Jharsuguda	Jharsuguda subdivision partitioned from the northern industrial belt of Sambalpur district.
1994	1 January	Decentralization Split	Deogarh	Deogarh subdivision partitioned from the northeastern forest belts of Sambalpur district.

== Divisions ==
Map of districts of Odisha. Northern Division Central Division Southern Division

The districts of Odisha have been placed under three different revenue divisions to streamline their governance. The divisions are Central, North and South with their headquarters at Kataka (Central Division), Sambalpur (Northern Division), Brahmapur (Southern Division) respectively. Each division consists of 10 districts, and has as its administrative head a Revenue Divisional Commissioner (RDC), a senior rank officer of Indian Administrative Service. The position of the RDC in the administrative hierarchy is that between that of the district administration and the state secretariat. The list of districts, organized by divisions:

Northern Division (HQ – Sambalpur)	Central Division (HQ – Kataka)	Southern Division (HQ – Brahmapur)
Angul; Balangir; Bargarh; Deogarh; Dhenkanal; Jharsuguda; Keonjhar; Sambalpur; Subarnapur; Sundargarh	Baleshwar; Bhadrak; Cuttack; Jagatsinghpur; Jajpur; Kendrapada; Khordha; Mayurbhanj; Nayagada; Puri	Boudh; Gajapati; Ganjam; Kalahandi; Kandhamal; Koraput; Malkangiri; Nabarangpur; Nuapada; Rayagada

== Administration ==
The Collector and District Magistrate, an officer of the Indian Administrative Service (IAS), is in charge of revenue collection and the general administration of a district. The Superintendent of Police (SP), an officer of the Indian Police Service (IPS), is responsible for maintaining law and order and managing related policing issues within the district. The 30 districts of Odisha are divided into 58 sub-divisions. These sub-divisions are governed by a Sub-Collector and Sub-Divisional Magistrate. For local governance, the sub-divisions are decentralized into Urban Local Bodies (ULBs) for urban areas and Blocks (Panchayat Samitis) for rural areas. The following table lists the administrative sub-divisions, along with the specific urban local bodies and community development blocks mapped hierarchically inside each sub-division, fully totaling 58 sub-divisions, 143 urban local bodies, and 314 blocks statewide:

District	Sub-divisions	Urban Local Bodies (ULBs) Mapped under Sub-division	Blocks (Panchayat Samitis) Mapped under Sub-division
Anugola	Anugola	Anugola (M)	Anugola, Banarpal
Anugola	Athmallik	Athmallik (NAC)	Athmallik, Kishorenagar
Anugola	Palalahada	Palalahada (NAC)	Palalahada
Anugola	Talacher	Talacher (M)	Talacher, Kaniha, Chhendipada
Balangir	Balangir	Balangir (M)	Balangir, Deogaon, Loisingha, Puintala
Balangir	Patnagad	Patnagad (NAC), Kantabanji (NAC)	Patnagad, Belpada, Khaprakhol, Turekela, Bangomunda, Muribahal
Balangir	Titilagad	Titilagad (M)	Titilagad, Gudvella, Saintala
Baleshwar	Baleshwar	Baleshwar (M), Jaleswar (M), Sora (M), Remuna (NAC), Simulia (NAC), Basta (NAC)	Baleshwar Sadar, Basta, Bhogarai, Jaleswar, Baliapal, Remuna, Sora, Simulia, Bahanaga, Khaira
Baleshwar	Nilagiri	Nilagiri (NAC)	Nilagiri, Oupada
Baragada	Baragada	Baragada (M), Attabira (NAC), Barpali (NAC)	Baragada, Attabira, Barpali, Bheden, Bhatli, Ambabhona
Baragada	Padmapur	Padmapur (NAC), Bijepur (NAC), Sohela (NAC)	Rajbodasambar, Bijepur, Sohela, Gaisilet, Paikamal, Jharbandh
Bhadrak	Bhadrak	Bhadrak (M), Basudevpur (M), Chandabali (NAC), Dhamanagar (NAC), Tihidi (NAC), Dhusuri (NAC)	Bhadrak Sadar, Basudevpur, Banta, Bhandaripokhari, Dhamanagar, Tihidi, Chandabali
Baudh	Baudh	Boudhagada (M)	Baudh, Harbhanga, Kantamal
Kataka	Kataka	Kataka (MC), Choudwar (M), Salepur (NAC)	Kataka Sadar, Barang, Tangi-Choudwar, Mahanga, Nischintakoili, Salepur, Niali, Kantapada
Kataka	Athagada	Athagada (NAC), Badamba (NAC), Narasinghpur (NAC)	Athagada, Badamba, Narasinghpur, Tigiria
Kataka	Banki	Banki (NAC)	Banki, Banki-Dampada
Debagada	Debagada	Debagada (M)	Tileibani, Riamal, Barkote
Dhenkanal	Dhenkanal	Dhenkanal (M), Gondia (NAC)	Dhenkanal Sadar, Gondia, Odapada
Dhenkanal	Hindol	Hindol (NAC)	Hindol
Dhenkanal	Kamakshyanagar	Kamakhyanagar (NAC), Bhuban (NAC)	Kamakhyanagar, Bhuban, Parjang, Kankadahad
Gajapati	Paralakhemundi	Paralakhemundi (M), Kashinagara (NAC)	Goshani, Gumma, Kashinagara, Mohana, Nuagada, R. Udayagiri, Rayagad
Ganjam	Brahmapur	Brahmapur (MC), Hinjilikatu (M), Digapahandi (NAC), Chikiti (NAC), Gopalpur (NAC)	Rangeilunda, Kukudakhandi, Hinjilikatu, Sanakhemundi, Digapahandi, Chikiti, Patrapur
Ganjam	Chhatrapur	Chhatrapur (M), Asika (M), Polasara (M), Kabisuryanagar (M), Ganjam (NAC), Khallikote (NAC), Kodala (NAC), Purushottampur (NAC), Rambha (NAC), Patrapur (NAC)	Chhatrapur, Ganjam, Khallikot, Purushottampur, Beguniapada, Asika, Kabisuryanagar, Kodala, Polasara
Ganjam	Bhanjanagar	Bhanjanagar (M), Buguda (NAC), Sorada (NAC), Jagannathprasad (NAC)	Bhanjanagar, Belaguntha, Buguda, Sorada, Dharakot, Sheragada, Jagannathprasad
Jagatsinghpur	Jagatsinghpur	Jagatsinghpur (M), Paradeep (M)	Jagatsinghpur, Balikuda, Biridi, Erasama, Kujang, Naugaon, Raghunathpur, Tirtol
Jajpur	Jajpur	Jajpur (M), Vyasanagar (M), Panikoili (NAC)	Jajpur, Badachana, Bari, Binjharpur, Danagadi, Dasharathpur, Dharmashala, Korei, Rasulpur, Sukinda
Jharsuguda	Jharsuguda	Jharsuguda (M), Brajrajnagar (M), Belpahad (M)	Jharsuguda Sadar, Lakhanpur, Laikera, Kirmira, Kolabira
Kalahandi	Bhabanipatana	Bhabanipatana (M), Kesinga (NAC), Narla (NAC)	Bhabanipatana, Kesinga, Lanjigada, Narla, Karlamunda, Madanpur Rampur, Thuamul Rampur
Kalahandi	Dharmagada	Dharmagada (NAC), Junagada (NAC), Jayapatana (NAC)	Dharmagada, Junagada, Jayapatana, Koksara, Golamunda, Kalampur
Kandhamala	Phulbani	Phulbani (M), G. Udayagiri (NAC)	Phulbani, Khajuripada, Phiringia, Chakapad, G. Udayagiri, Raikia, Tikabali
Kandhamala	Baliguda	Baliguda (NAC)	Baliguda, Daringbadi, K. Nuagam, Kotagada, Tumudibandha
Kendrapada	Kendrapada	Kendrapada (M), Pattamundai (M)	Kendrapada Sadar, Derabish, Garadapur, Marshaghai, Mahakalapada, Pattamundai, Aali, Rajkanika, Rajnagar
Kendujhar	Kendujhar	Kendujhargada (M)	Kendujhar Sadar, Bansapal, Telkoi, Patna, Saharapada, Ghatgaon
Kendujhar	Anandapur	Anandapur (M)	Anandapur, Ghasipura, Hatadihi
Kendujhar	Champua	Badabil (M), Joda (M), Champua (NAC)	Champua, Jhumpura, Joda
Khordha	Bhubaneswar	Bhubaneswar (MC), Jatani (M)	Bhubaneswar, Balianta, Balipatna, Jatani
Khordha	Khordha	Khordha (M), Balugaon (NAC), Banapur (NAC), Tangi (NAC)	Khordha Sadar, Begunia, Bolagada, Tangi, Chilika, Banapur
Koraput	Koraput	Koraput (M), Sunabeda (M)	Koraput Sadar, Semiliguda, Pottangi, Nandapur, Lamataput, Dasamantapur, Lakshmipur, Narayanapatna, Bandhugaon
Koraput	Jayapur	Jayapur (M), Kotpad (NAC), Borigumma (NAC)	Jayapur, Borigumma, Kotpad, Kundra, Boipariguda
Malkangiri	Malkangiri	Malkangiri (M), Balimela (NAC)	Malkangiri Sadar, Kalimela, Padia, Mathili, Khairput, Korkunda, Kudumulugumma
Mayurbhanj	Baripada	Baripada (M), Betanati (NAC), Bangiriposi (NAC), Chitrada (NAC), Rasagobindapur (NAC)	Baripada Sadar, Badasahi, Betanati, Shamakhunta, Morada, Rasagobindapur, Saraskana, Suliapada, Gopabandhu Nagar
Mayurbhanj	Bamanghati	Rairangpur (M)	Rairangpur, Bahalda, Badampahar, Jamda, Tiring, Kusumi, Bisoi
Mayurbhanj	Panchapidha	Karanjia (M), Jashipur (NAC)	Karanjia, Jashipur, Sukruli, Raruan, Thakurmunda
Mayurbhanj	Kaptipada	Udala (NAC), Kaptipada (NAC)	Udala, Khunta, Kaptipada
Nabarangpur	Nabarangpur	Nabarangpur (M), Umarkot (M)	Nabarangpur Sadar, Kosagumuda, Papadahandi, Tentulikhunti, Nandahandi, Dabugam, Jharigam, Raighar, Umarkot, Chandahandi
Nayagada	Nayagada	Nayagada (M), Dashapalla (NAC), Khandapada (NAC), Ranpur (NAC), Odagaon (NAC)	Bhapur, Dashapalla, Gania, Khandapada, Nuagaon, Nayagada Sadar, Odagaon, Ranpur
Nuapada	Nuapada	Nuapada (NAC), Khadial Road (NAC), Khadial (NAC)	Nuapada, Komna, Khadial, Boden, Sinapali
Puri	Puri	Puri (MC), Konark (NAC), Nimapada (NAC), Pipli (NAC)	Puri Sadar, Satyabadi, Brahmagiri, Kanas, Delanga, Nimapada, Kakatpur, Astaranga, Pipli, Gop, Krushnaprasad
Rayagada	Rayagada	Rayagada (M)	Rayagada, Kashipur, Kolnara, Kalyansinghpur
Rayagada	Gunupur	Gunupur (M), Gudari (NAC)	Gunupur, Gudari, Padmapur, Ramanaguda, Bissam Cuttack, Muniguda
Sambalpur	Sambalpur	Sambalpur (MC), Burla (NAC), Hirakud (NAC)	Dhankauda, Maneswar, Jujomura, Rengali
Sambalpur	Kuchinda	Kuchinda (NAC)	Kuchinda, Bamra, Jamankira
Sambalpur	Redhakhol	Redhakhol (NAC)	Redhakhol, Naktideul
Subarnapur	Sonpur	Sonpur (M), Binika (NAC)	Sonpur, Tarbha, Dunguripali, Binika
Subarnapur	Birmaharajpur	None	Birmaharajpur, Ullunda
Sundaragada	Sundaragada	Sundaragada (M)	Sundaragada, Tangarpali, Hemgir, Lephripada, Badagan, Balisankara, Sabdega
Sundaragada	Panposh	Raurkela (MC)	Lathikata, Bisra, Kuarmunda, Nuagaon
Sundaragada	Banaigada	None	Banaigada, Lahunipada, Gurundia, Koida

== Districts ==
Among the 30 districts in Odisha, Mayurbhanj is the largest and Jagatsinghpur is the smallest district by area. Ganjam is the largest and Debagada is the smallest district by population in Odisha. Bhubaneswar, the capital city of Odisha is located in Khordha district.

The area and population of the 30 districts are given below:

Districts	Headquarters	Formation Day	Population (2011 Census)	Area (km^{2})	Density in 2011 (/km^{2})	Map
Anugola	Anugola	1 April 1993	1,273,821	6,375	200	
Balangir	Balangir	1 November 1949	1,648,997	6,575	251	
Baleshwar	Baleshwar	23 October 1828	2,320,529	3,634	638	
Baragada	Baragada	1 April 1993	1,481,255	5,837	254	
Bhadrak	Bhadrak	1 April 1993	1,506,337	2,505	601	
Boudh	Boudh	2 January 1994	441,162	3444.8	128	
Debagada	Debagada	1 January 1994	312,520	2,782	112	
Dhenkanal	Dhenkanal	1 January 1948	1,192,811	4,452	268	
Gajapati	Paralakhemundi	2 October 1992	577,817	3,850	150	
Ganjam	Chhatrapur	1 April 1936	3,529,031	8,206	430	
Jagatsinghapur	Jagatsinghapur	1 April 1993	1,136,971	1,759	646	
Jajpur	Jajpur	1 April 1993	1,827,192	2887.69	633	
Jharsuguda	Jharsuguda	1 January 1994	579,505	2,081	278	
Kalahandi	Bhabanipatana	1 January 1948	1,576,869	7,920	199	
Kandhamala	Kandhamala	1 January 1994	733,110	7,654	96	
Kataka	Kataka	23 October 1828	2,624,470	3,932	667	
Kendrapada	Kendrapada	1 April 1993	1,440,361	2,644	545	
Kendujhar	Kendujhar	1 January 1948	1,801,733	8,303	217	
Khordha	Khordha	1 April 1993	2,251,673	2,813	800	
Koraput	Koraput	1 April 1936	1,379,647	8,807	157	
Malkangiri	Malkangiri	2 October 1992	613,192	5,791	106	
Mayurbhanj	Baripada	1 January 1949	2,519,738	10,418	242	
Nabarangpur	Nabarangapur	2 October 1992	1,220,946	5,294	231	
Nayagada	Nayagada	1 April 1993	962,789	3,890	247	
Nuapada	Nuapada	1 April 1993	610,382	3,852	158	
Puri	Puri	23 October 1828	1,698,730	3,051	557	
Rayagada	Rayagada	2 October 1992	967,911	7,073	137	
Sambalpur	Sambalpur	16 October 1905	1,041,099	6,702	155	
Subarnapur	Subarnapur	1 April 1993	610,183	2,337	261	
Sundaragada	Sundaragada	1 January 1948	2,093,437	9,712	215	
Odisha	Bhubaneshwar	1 April 1936	41,974,218	154,468.98	272	

- List of Tahsils and CD Blocks in Odisha
