= Tainsar =

Tainsar is a village & it comes in the range of Tileibani block of Debagarh district of Odisha, an eastern state of India. It is home to around 250 families. A mixture of pure Odia and Sambalpuri(a dialect of Odia) is spoken(known as Debagarhia) in the village. Farming is a common practice in the village. Tainsar is a Gram Panchayat (GP) covering villages like Kurod, Bhukabeda, Nuabhuin, Kharumunda, Kureibahal, Kailash, Jareikela. Tainsar is a large village and it has many streets like Tala sahi, Upara sahi, Nua sahi, Thalipathar, Munda sahi, Sahara sahi etc. There is a Radha Krishna temple in the village located in Talasahi.
