= National Highway 143H (India) =

National Highway in India

National Highway 143H
- Map of National Highway 143H in red

Route information
- Auxiliary route of NH 43
- Length: 35 km (22 mi)

Major junctions
- North end: Joram
- South end: Litebeda

Location
- Country: India
- States: Odisha, Jharkhand

Highway system
- Roads in India; Expressways; National; State; Asian
← NH 143	→ NH 143H

National Highway 143H, commonly referred to as NH 143H is a national highway in India. It is a secondary route of National Highway 43. NH-143H runs in the states of Odisha and Jharkhand in India.

== Route ==
NH143H connects Joram, Ambapani, Salangabahal, Bihabandh and Litebeda in the states of Jharkhand and Odisha.

== Junctions ==
NH 143 Terminal near Joram.

== See also ==
- List of national highways in India
- List of national highways in India by state
