= NH 11B =

NH 11B may refer to:

- National Highway 11B (India)
- New Hampshire Route 11B, United States
