= List of Tahasils and CD Blocks in Odisha =

CD Blocks in Odisha

Political Map of Odisha

Odisha, a state on the eastern coast of India, is divided into 30 administrative geographical units called districts. These 30 districts have been placed under three different revenue divisions to streamline their governance. The Collector & District Magistrate is responsible for collecting the revenue and maintaining law and order in the district. Each District is separated into Sub-Divisions, each governed by a Sub-Collector & Sub-Divisional Magistrate. The Sub-Divisions are further divided into Tahasils. The Tahasils are headed by Tahasildar.

Odisha has 3 Divisions, 30 Districts, 58 Sub-Divisions, 317 Tahasils and 314 Blocks.

== List of Tahasils and CD Blocks ==
No.	District	Sub-Division	Tahasil	Block
1	Anugola	Anugola	1. Anugola; 2. Banarpal; 3. Chhendipada	1. Anugola; 2. Banarpal; 3. Chhendipada
1	Anugola	Athamallik	1. Athamallik; 2. Kishorenagar	1. Athamallik; 2. Kishorenagar
1	Anugola	Palalahada	1. Palalahada	1. Palalahada
1	Anugola	Talacher	1. Talacher; 2. Kaniha	1. Talacher; 2. Kaniha
2	Balangir	Balangir	1. Agalpur; 2. Balangir; 3. Deogaon; 4. Loisingha; 5. Puintala; 6. Tusura	1. Agalpur; 2. Balangir; 3. Deogaon; 4. Gudvella; 5. Loisingha; 6. Puintala
2	Balangir	Patnagarh	1. Belpada; 2. Khaprakhol; 3. Patnagarh	1. Belpada; 2. Khaprakhol; 3. Patnagarh
2	Balangir	Titlagarh	1. Bangomunda; 2. Kantabanji; 3. Muribahal; 4. Saintala; 5. Titilagarh	1. Bangomunda; 2. Kantabanji; 3. Muribahal; 4. Titlagarh; 5. Turekela
3	Baleshwar	Baleshwar	1. Bahanaga; 2. Baleshwar; 3. Baliapal; 4. Basta; 5. Bhograi; 6. Jaleswar; 7. Khaira; 8. Remuna; 9. Simulia; 10. Sora	1. Bahanaga; 2. Baleshwar; 3. Baliapal; 4. Basta; 5. Bhograi; 6. Jaleswar; 7. Khaira; 8. Remuna; 9. Simulia; 10. Sora
3	Baleshwar	Nilagiri	1. Nilagiri; 2. Oupada	1. Nillgiri; 2. Oupada
4	Baragada	Baragada	1. Ambabhona; 2. Attabira; 3. Baragada; 4. Barpali; 5. Bhatli; 6. Bheden	1. Ambabhona; 2. Attabira; 3. Baragada; 4. Barpali; 5. Bhatli; 6. Bheden
4	Baragada	Padampur	1. Bijepur; 2. Gaisilet; 3. Jharbandh; 4. Padampur; 5. Paikmal; 6. Sohela	1. Bijepur; 2. Gaisilet; 3. Jharbandh; 4. Rajbodasambar; 5. Paikmal; 6. Sohela
5	Bhadrak	Bhadrak	1. Bhadrak; 2. Basudevpur; 3. Bhandaripokhari; 4. Banta; 5. Chandabali; 6. Dhamnagar; 7. Tihidi	1. Bhadrak; 2. Basudevpur; 3. Bhandaripokhari; 4. Banta; 5. Chandabali; 6. Dhamnagar; 7. Tihidi
6	Boudh	Boudh	1. Boudh; 2. Harabhanga; 3. Kantamal	1. Boudh; 2. Harabhanga; 3. Kantamal
7	Kataka	Athagada	1. Athagada; 2. Badamba; 3. Narasinghpur; 4. Tigiria	1. Athagada; 2. Badamba; 3. Narasinghpur; 4. Tigiria
7	Kataka	Banki	1. Banki; 2. Dampada	1. Banki; 2. Dampada
7	Kataka	Kataka	1. Baranga; 2. Kataka Sadar; 3. Kantapada; 4. Kishannagar; 5. Mahanga; 6. Niali; 7. Nischintakoili; 8. Salepur; 9. Tangi-Choudwar	1. Baranga; 2. Kataka Sadar; 3. Kantapada; 4. Mahanga; 5. Niali; 6. Nischintakoili; 7. Salepur; 8. Tangi-Choudwar
8	Debagada	Debagada	1. Barkote; 2. Debagada; 3. Riamal	1. Barkote; 2. Riamal; 3. Tileibani
9	Dhenkanal	Dhenkanal Sadar	1. Dhenkanal Sadar; 2. Gondia; 3. Odapada	1. Dhenkanal Sadar; 2. Gondia; 3. Odapada
9	Dhenkanal	Hindol	1. Hindol	1. Hindol
9	Dhenkanal	Kamakhyanagar	1. Bhuban; 2. Kamakhyanagar; 3. Kankadahad; 4. Parjang	1. Bhuban; 2. Kamakhyanagar; 3. Kankadahad; 4. Parjang
10	Gajapati	Parlakhemundi	1. Gumma; 2. Kashinagar; 3. Mohana; 4. Nuagada; 5. Paralakhemundi; 6. R.Udayagiri; 7. Rayagada	1. Gumma; 2. Gosani; 3. Kashinagar; 4. Mohana; 5. Nuagada; 6. R.Udayagiri; 7. Rayagada
11	Ganjam	Brahmapur	1. Brahmapur; 2. Chikiti; 3. Digapahandi; 4. Kanisi; 5. Kukudakhandi; 6. Patrapur; 7. Sankhemundi	1. Chikiti; 2. Digapahandi; 3. Kukudakhandi; 4. Patrapur; 5. Rangeilunda; 6. Sankhemundi
11	Ganjam	Bhanjanagar	1. Asika; 2. Bellaguntha; 3. Bhanjanagar; 4. Buguda; 5. Dharakote; 6. Jagannathprasad; 7. Seragada; 8. Sorada	1. Asika; 2. Bellaguntha; 3. Bhanjanagar; 4. Buguda; 5. Dharakote; 6. Jagannathprasad; 7. Seragada; 8. Sorada
11	Ganjam	Chhatrapur	1. Chhatrapur; 2. Ganjam; 3. Hinjilikatu; 4. Kabisuryanagar; 5. Khalikote; 6. Kodala; 7. Polasara; 8. Purushottampur	1. Beguniapada; 2. Chhatrapur; 3. Ganjam; 4. Hinjilikatu; 5. Kabisuryanagar; 6. Khalikote; 7. Polasara; 8. Purushottampur
12	Jagatsinghpur	Jagatsinghpur	1. Balikuda; 2. Biridi; 3. Erasama; 4. Jagatsinghpur; 5. Kujanga; 6. Naugaon; 7. Raghunathpur; 8. Tirtol	1. Balikuda; 2. Biridi; 3. Erasama; 4. Jagatsinghpur; 5. Kujanga; 6. Naugaon; 7. Raghunathpur; 8. Tirtol
13	Jajpur	Jajpur	1. Bari; 2. Binjharpur; 3. Danagadi; 4. Darpan; 5. Dasharathpur; 6. Dharmashala; 7. Jajpur; 8. Rasulpur; 9. Sukinda; 10. Vyasanagar	1. Badchana; 2. Bari; 3. Binjharpur; 4. Danagadi; 5. Dasharathpur; 6. Dharmashala; 7. Jajpur; 8. Korei; 9. Rasulpur; 10. Sukinda
14	Jharsuguda	Jharsuguda	1. Jharsuguda; 2. Kirmira; 3. Kolabira; 4. Laikera; 5. Lakhanpur	1. Jharsuguda; 2. Kirmira; 3. Kolabira; 4. Laikera; 5. Lakhanpur
15	Kalahandi	Bhabanipatana	1. Kalahandi; 2. Karlamunda; 3. Kesinga; 4. Lanjigada; 5. Madanpur-Rampur; 6. Narla; 7. Thuamul-Rampur	1. Bhawanipatna; 2. Karlamunda; 3. Kesinga; 4. Lanjigada; 5. Madanpur-Rampur; 6. Narla; 7. Thuamul-Rampur
15	Kalahandi	Dharmagada	1. Dharmagada; 2. Golamunda; 3. Jayapatana; 4. Junagada; 5. Kalampur; 6. Koksara	1. Dharmagada; 2. Golamunda; 3. Jayapatana; 4. Junagada; 5. Kalampur; 6. Koksara
16	Kandhamala	Baliguda	1. Baliguda; 2. Chakapad; 3. Daringbadi; 4. G. Udayagiri; 5. K. Nuagaon; 6. Kotagarh; 7. Raikia; 8. Tikabali; 9. Tumudibandh	1. Baliguda; 2. Chakapad; 3. Daringbadi; 4. G. Udayagiri; 5. K. Nuagaon; 6. Kotagarh; 7. Raikia; 8. Tikabali; 9. Tumudibandh
16	Kandhamala	Kandhamala	1. Khajuripada; 2. Phiringia; 3. Kandhamala	1. Khajuripada; 2. Phiringia; 3. Kandhamala
17	Kendrapada	Kendrapada	1. Aali; 2. Derabish; 3. Garadpur; 4. Kanika; 5. Kendrapada; 6. Mahakalpara; 7. Marshaghai; 8. Pattamundai; 9. Rajnagar	1. Aali; 2. Derabish; 3. Garadpur; 4. Kendrapada; 5. Mahakalpada; 6. Marshaghai; 7. Pattamundai; 8. Rajkanika; 9. Rajnagar
18	Kendujhar	Anandapur	1. Anandapur; 2. Ghasipura; 3. Hatadihi	1. Anandapur; 2. Ghasipura; 3. Hatadihi
18	Kendujhar	Champua	1. Badabil; 2. Champua; 3. Jhumpura	1. Champua; 2. Jhumpura; 3. Joda
18	Kendujhar	Kendujhar	1. Banspal; 2. Ghatagaon; 3. Harichandanpur; 4. Kendujhar; 5. Patna; 6. Saharpada; 7. Telkoi	1. Banspal; 2. Ghatagaon; 3. Harichandanpur; 4. Kendujhar; 5. Patna; 6. Saharpada; 7. Telkoi
19	Khordha	Bhubaneswar	1. Balianta; 2. Balipatana; 3. Bhubaneswar; 4. Jatani	1. Balianta; 2. Balipatana; 3. Bhubaneswar; 4. Jatani
19	Khordha	Khordha	1. Banapur; 2. Begunia; 3. Bolagada; 4. Chilika; 5. Khordha; 6. Tangi	1. Banapur; 2. Begunia; 3. Bolagada; 4. Chilika; 5. Khordha; 6. Tangi
20	Koraput	Jayapur	1. Boipariguda; 2. Borigumma; 3. Jayapur; 4. Kotpad; 5. Kundura	1. Boipariguda; 2. Borigumma; 3. Jayapur; 4. Kotpad; 5. Kundura
20	Koraput	Koraput	1. Bandhugaon; 2. Dasmantpur; 3. Koraput; 4. Laxmipur; 5. Nandapur; 6. Narayanpatna; 7. Machkund; 8. Pottangi; 9. Similiguda	1. Bandhugaon; 2. Dasmantpur; 3. Koraput; 4. Machkund; 5. Laxmipur; 6. Nandapur; 7. Narayanpatna; 8. Pottangi; 9. Similiguda
21	Malkangiri	Malkangiri	1. Chitrakonda; 2. Kalimela; 3. Khairput; 4. Kudumulugumma; 5. Malkangiri; 6. Mathili; 7. Motu	1. Chitrakonda; 2. Kalimela; 3. Khairput; 4. Korukonda; 5. Malkangiri; 6. Mathili; 7. Padia
22	Mayurbhanj	Bamanghati	1. Bahalada; 2. Bijatola; 3. Bisoi; 4. Jamada; 5. Kusumi; 6. Rairangpur; 7. Tiring	1. Bahalda; 2. Bijatola; 3. Bisoi; 4. Jamda; 5. Kusumi; 6. Rairangpur; 7. Tiring
22	Mayurbhanj	Baripada	1. Bangiriposi; 2. Baripada; 3. Badasahi; 4. Betanati; 5. Kuliana; 6. Morada; 7. Rasagobindapur; 8. Shamakhunta; 9. Suliapada; 10. Saraskana	1. Bangiriposi; 2. Baripada; 3. Badasahi; 4. Betanati; 5. Kuliana; 6. Morada; 7. Rasagobindapur; 8. Shamakhunta; 9. Suliapada; 10. Saraskana
22	Mayurbhanj	Kaptipada	1. Gopabandhunagar; 2. Kaptipada; 3. Khunta; 4. Udala	1. Gopabandhunagar; 2. Kaptipada; 3. Khunta; 4. Udala
22	Mayurbhanj	Panchapidha	1. Jashipur; 2. Karanjia; 3. Raruan; 4. Sukuruli; 5. Thakurmunda	1. Jashipur; 2. Karanjia; 3. Raruan; 4. Sukuruli; 5. Thakurmunda
23	Nabarangpur	Nabarangpur	1. Chandahandi; 2. Dabugam; 3. Jharigam; 4. Kodinga; 5. Nabarangpur; 6. Nandahandi; 7. Papadahandi; 8. Raighar; 9. Tentulikhunti; 10. Umarkot	1. Chandahandi; 2. Dabugam; 3. Jharigam; 4. Kosagumuda; 5. Nabarangpur; 6. Nandahandi; 7. Papadahandi; 8. Raighar; 9. Tentulikhunti; 10. Umarkot
24	Nayagada	Nayagada	1. Bhapur; 2. Dashapalla; 3. Gania; 4. Khandapada; 5. Nayagada; 6. Nuagaon; 7. Odagaon; 8. Ranapur	1. Bhapur; 2. Dashapalla; 3. Gania; 4. Khandapada; 5. Nayagada; 6. Nuagaon; 7. Odagaon; 8. Ranapur
25	Nuapada	Nuapada	1. Boden; 2. Khadial; 3. Komna; 4. Nuapada; 5. Sinapali	1. Boden; 2. Khadial; 3. Komna; 4. Nuapada; 5. Sinapali
26	Puri	Puri	1. Astarang; 2. Brahmagiri; 3. Delanga; 4. Gop; 5. Kakatpur; 6. Kanas; 7. Krushnaprasada; 8. Nimapada; 9. Pipili; 10. Puri; 11. Satyabadi	1. Astarang; 2. Brahmagiri; 3. Delanga; 4. Gop; 5. Kakatpur; 6. Kanas; 7. Krushnaprasada; 8. Nimapada; 9. Pipili; 10. Puri Sadar; 11. Satyabadi
27	Rayagada	Gunupur	1. Bissamcuttack; 2. Chandrapur; 3. Gudari; 4. Gunupur; 5. Muniguda; 6. Padmapur; 7. Ramanaguda	1. Bissamcuttack; 2. Chandrapur; 3. Gudari; 4. Gunupur; 5. Muniguda; 6. Padmapur; 7. Ramanaguda
27	Rayagada	Rayagada	1. Kalyanasinghpur; 2. Kasipur; 3. Kolnara; 4. Rayagada	1. Kalyanasinghpur; 2. Kasipur; 3. Kolnara; 4. Rayagada
28	Sambalpur	Kuchinda	1. Bamra; 2. Jamankira; 3. Kuchinda	1. Bamra; 2. Jamankira; 3. Kuchinda
28	Sambalpur	Redhakhol	1. Naktideul; 2. Redhakhol	1. Naktideul; 2. Redahakhol
28	Sambalpur	Sambalpur	1. Jujumura; 2. Maneswar; 3. Rengali; 4. Sambalpur	1. Dhankauda; 2. Jujomora; 3. Maneswar; 4. Rengali
29	Subarnapur	Biramaharajpur	1. Biramaharajpur; 2. Ullunda	1. Biramaharajpur; 2. Ullunda
29	Subarnapur	Sonpur	1. Binika; 2. Rampur; 3. Sonpur; 4. Tarabha	1. Binika; 2. Dunguripalli; 3. Sonpur; 4. Tarabha
30	Sundaragada	Banaigada	1. Banaigada; 2. Gurundia; 3. Koida; 4. Lahunipada	1. Banaigada; 2. Gurundia; 3. Koida; 4. Lahunipada
30	Sundaragada	Panposh	1. Biramitrapur; 2. Bisra; 3. Lathikata; 4. Panposh; 5. Rourkela	1. Bisra; 2. Kuarmunda; 3. Lathikata; 4. Nuagaon
30	Sundaragada	Sundaragada	1. Balisankara; 2. Bargaon; 3. Hemgir; 4. Kutra; 5. Lephripara; 6. Rajgangpur; 7. Subdega; 8. Sundargarh Sadar; 9. Tangarpalli	1. Balisankara; 2. Bargaon; 3. Hemgir; 4. Kutra; 5. Lephripada; 6. Rajgangpur; 7. Subdega; 8. Sundargarh; 9. Tangarpalli
