= Stone circles of Junapani =

Historic site in Maharashtra, India

- जुनापाणी येथील शिळावर्तुळे (Marathi)
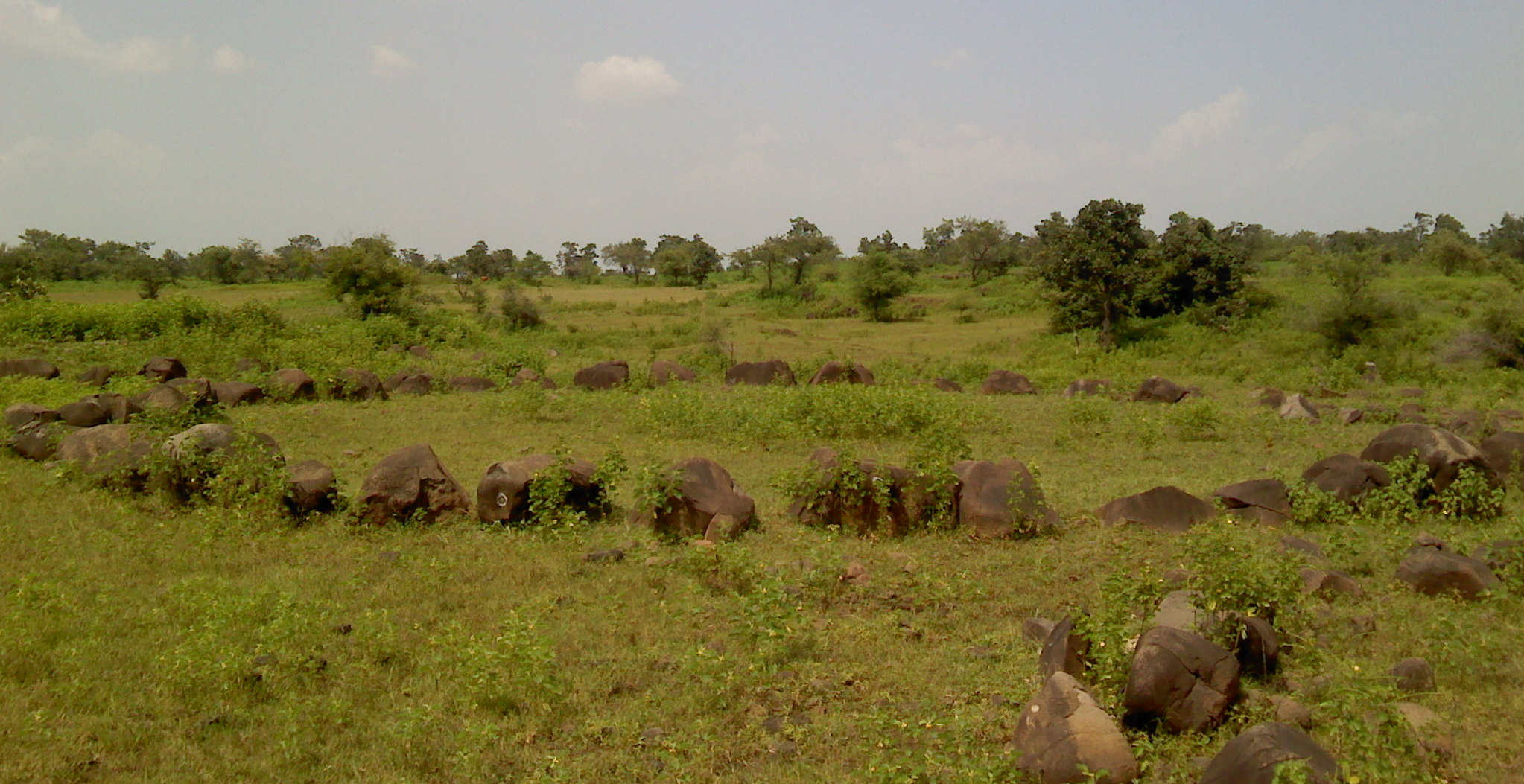
- Stone circle at Junapani

- Location within Maharashtra
- 21°11′49″N 78°59′56″E
- Location: Dist. Nagpur, Maharashtra.

Site notes
- Governing body: Archaeological Survey of India

The stone circles of Junapani are prehistoric megalithic circles in Junapani, near Nagpur in the Indian state of Maharashtra. There are about 300 such stone circles noted around Junapani. They were first excavated by J. H. Rivett-Carnac in 1879, yielding a variety of iron objects including daggers, flat axes with cross-ring fasteners, hoes, rings, bracelets, horse bits, chisels with long blades, and pointed tongs, possibly covered with a wooden handle. There is also evidence of black and red pottery, such as bowls featuring linear paintings in black. The burial sites were characterized by cairns. About 150 stone circles have been studied and documented. A notable feature is the cup-marked stones in the circles which seem to suggest an astronomical significance. This aspect has been discerned from the fact that the cup-marked stones are fixed at specific locations denoting specific directions.

These structures are designated by the Archaeological Survey of India (ASI) as monuments of national importance. The site was excavated by ASI in 1962 which unearthed three stone circles. The Tata Institute of Fundamental Research (TIFR) has funded additional studies.

== Geography ==
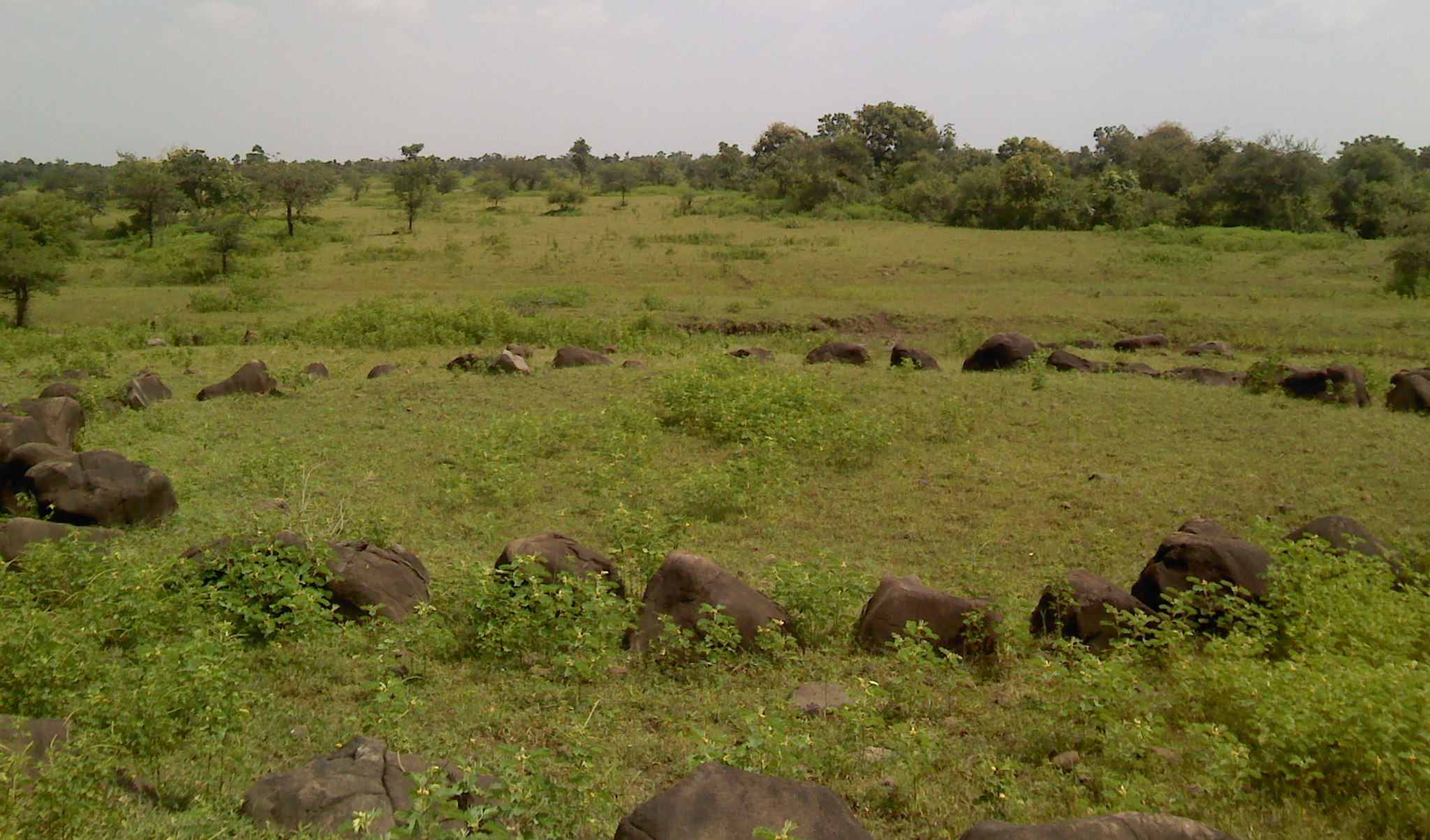
Another view of the Stone Circle

The stone circles of Junapani is an uninhabited burial site containing Sepulchral megaliths with remains of the dead. These are found in a small area, about 10 kilometres (6.2 mi) northwest of Nagpur city in central India, in the Vidharba region. They are of fairly large size, visible on Google Earth, and grouped near banks of rivers. It is located on the highway to Katol and forms the northern fringe of central India's megalith distribution.

== History ==
Human habitation in the region is dated to 1000 BC and continues to exist to present day. The area was an important part of the north south corridor of India. The megaliths found here are dated from 1000 BC to 300 AD. This assessment is based on the many antiquaries unearthed from the Sepulchral of the megalithic period. The iron implements found here denote a period of around 1000 BC. These are identified by local communities of different clans. One particular feature noted in these circles is the placement of stones with cup marks. It is inferred that these circles have nothing in common with the menhirs, dolmens and other non-sepulchral and sepulchral megalithic structures of South India. Rivett Carnac was the first to report on his excavation of stone circles of Junapani, in 1879.

Junapani is the second largest site, with 150 stone circles of megalithic period, out of 51 sites around Nagpur Region, and 89 in the Vidharba Region. B.K. Thapar was involved with excavations of the site in 1961. Initially, three stone circles were unearthed of which two circles revealed human remains associated with funerary objects; an animal skeleton of the Equidae (horse) family was also found. During these excavations, only cup-marked stones in the stone circles were noted. To establish the significance of these cup marks, which are fixed with specific orientation, TIFR instituted studies to establish if these stone circles have any link with astronomy or cosmogony of the people of the area.

== Archaeological finds ==
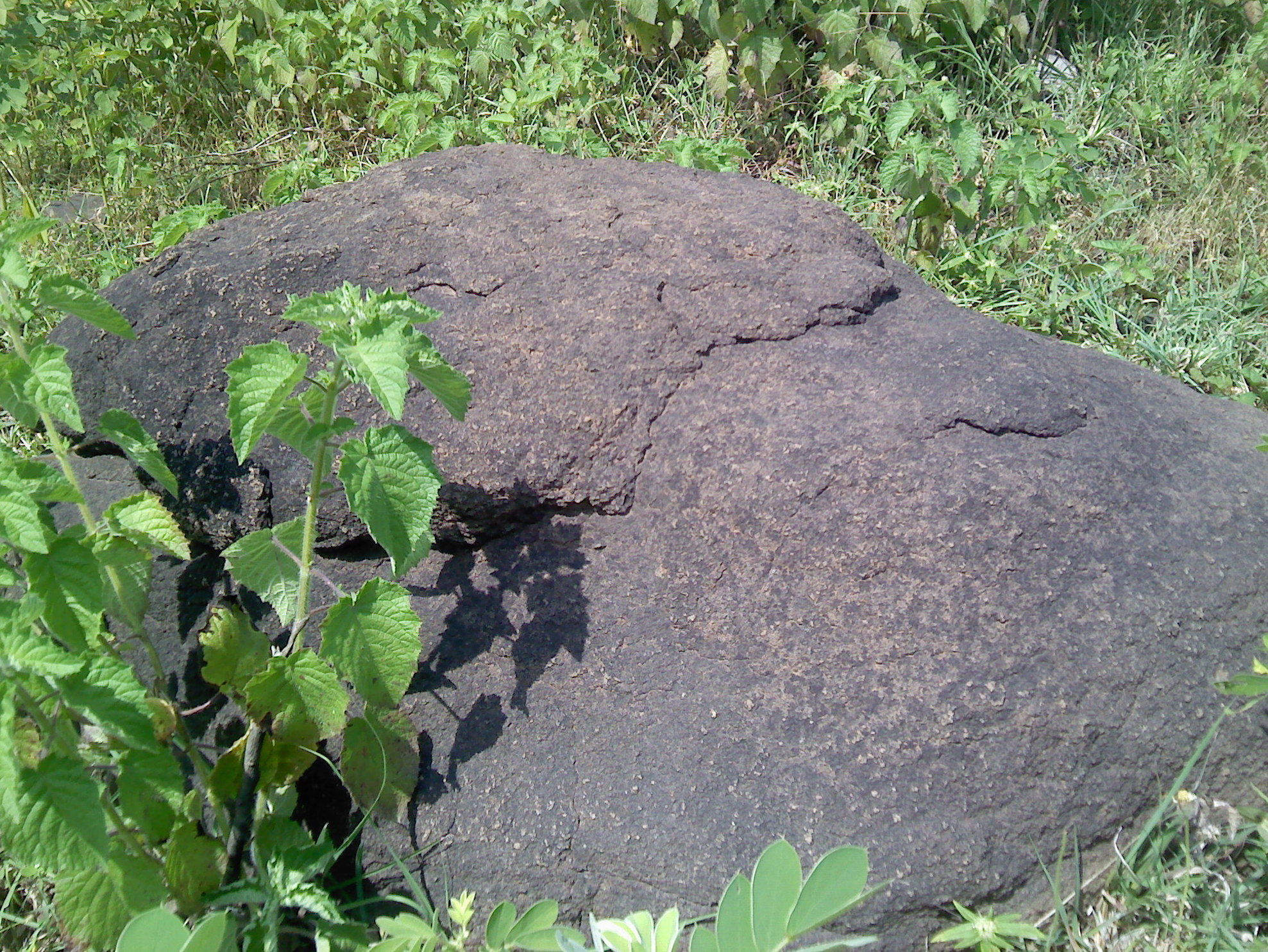
Close view of a stone in the Stone Circle

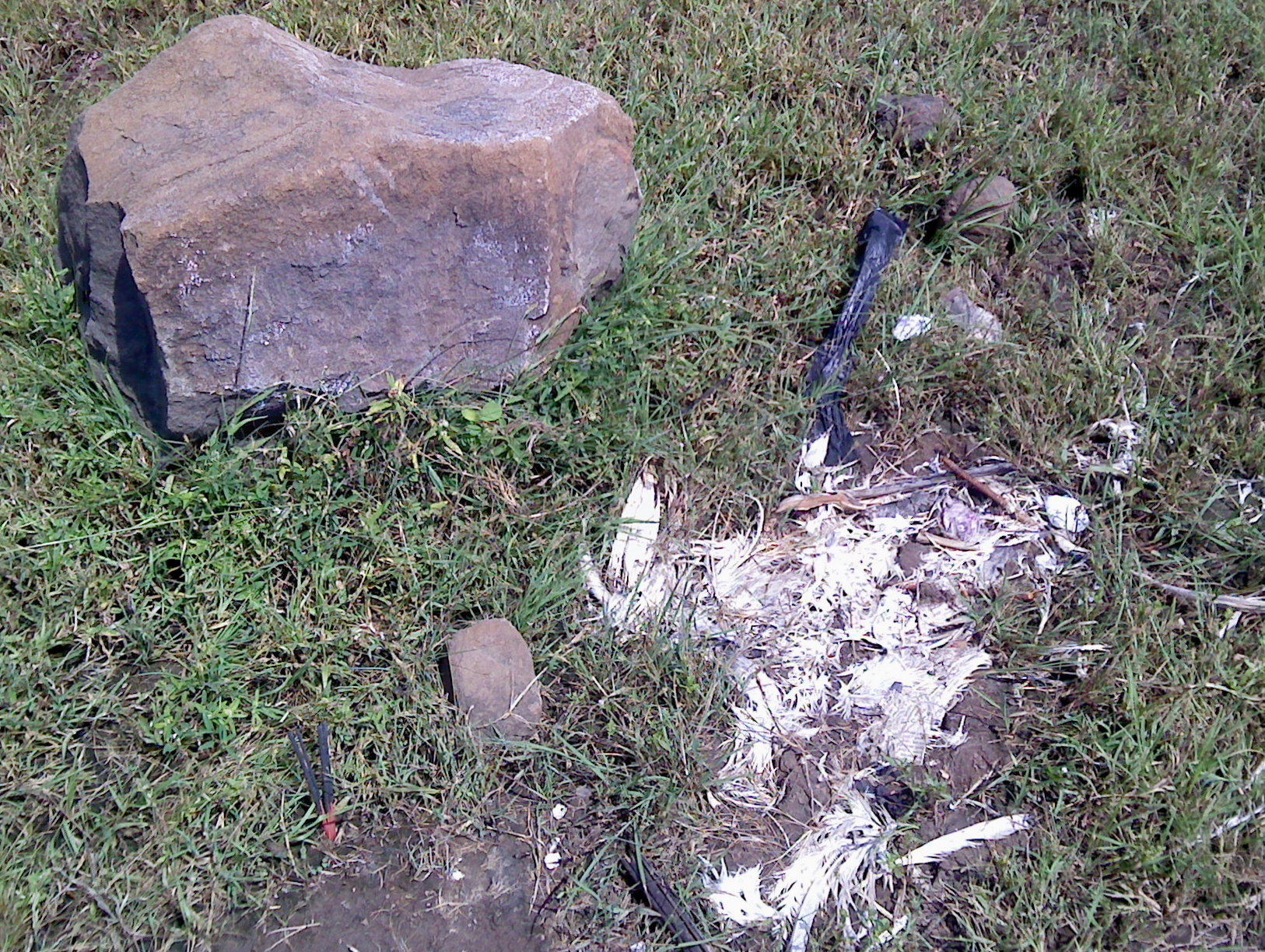
Chicken feathers within the Stone Circles indicative of tantric worship in recent years

The funerary antiquaries at this megalithic burial site are painted red pottery (a few with Megalithic Graffiti Symbols), micaceous red and the coarse red ware. These finds are identical to similar finds from other locations in the region such as from Kaundinyapura, Paunar, Takalghat and Khapa, west of Nagpur; the last two sites were excavated in 1968 on both banks of the Krishna River.

TIFR studies (including mapping) have so far covered 56 stone circles and most of them are found to be in a good state of preservation; they are of a few meters diameter. Cup marks have been recorded on 20 of these circles, with seven having marks on the sides. From an analysis of the location of these cup circles, it has been noted that the cup-marks with parallel lines or orthogonal sequences are seen either in a straight line or with a ‘+’ sign form, and also that the ‘+’ sign lines are aligned radially or tangentially within or around the circle with a definite orientation. A specific angular range has also been recorded in all the cup marks, which are in the form of 3 clusters.

The cup marks are a few centimeters in length, specifically located along the stone circles are indicative of locating them with orientation towards the sky with specific angles with respect to the north. The directions recorded are 118, 208 and 334 degrees to the north. These could be stellar oriented to show the rising and setting times of specific stars and weather changes over the seasons, and setting of the monsoon season, in particular.

There are many other finds reported from this site. A copper bell with iron tongue was located in one of the circles. In three circles excavated, heaps of sticky black clay was found heaped around the funerary finds. Many types of Iron implements were also found here attesting to the site's title as "iron-using". Find of stone pestle has also been reported. B.K. Thapar found Middle Stone Age tools here.

== Bibliography ==
- Ghosh, Amalananda (1990). An Encyclopaedia of Indian Archaeology. BRILL. ISBN 9789004092648.
- Deo, S.B. (1985). "The Personality of Vidarbha Megaliths". Studies in India Archaeology. Popular Prakashan. ISBN 9780861320882.
