= Dohole =

Village in Maharashtra

- village
- Location in Maharashtra, India Dohole (India)
- Coordinates: 19.3803619°N 73.2079716°E
- Country: India
- State: Maharashtra
- District: Thane
- Taluka: Bhiwandi
- Elevation: 28 m (92 ft)

Population (2011)
  - Total: 1,644
- Time zone: UTC+5:30 (IST)
- 2011 census code: 552613

Dohole is a village in the Thane district of Maharashtra, India. It is located in the Bhiwandi taluka. It lies on AH47 (Mumbai-Nashik highway).

== Demographics ==
According to the 2011 census of India, Dohole has 361 households. The effective literacy rate (i.e. the literacy rate of population excluding children aged 6 and below) is 67.39%.

Demographics (2011 Census)
| | Total | Male | Female |
|---|---|---|---|
| Population | 1644 | 852 | 792 |
| Children aged below 6 years | 301 | 160 | 141 |
| Scheduled caste | 164 | 84 | 80 |
| Scheduled tribe | 677 | 329 | 348 |
| Literates | 905 | 508 | 397 |
| Workers (all) | 614 | 447 | 167 |
| Main workers (total) | 583 | 432 | 151 |
| Main workers: Cultivators | 35 | 34 | 1 |
| Main workers: Agricultural labourers | 227 | 120 | 107 |
| Main workers: Household industry workers | 10 | 9 | 1 |
| Main workers: Other | 311 | 269 | 42 |
| Marginal workers (total) | 31 | 15 | 16 |
| Marginal workers: Cultivators | 10 | 6 | 4 |
| Marginal workers: Agricultural labourers | 3 | 0 | 3 |
| Marginal workers: Household industry workers | 3 | 0 | 3 |
| Marginal workers: Others | 15 | 9 | 6 |
| Non-workers | 1030 | 405 | 625 |
