= Geography of Sambalpur =

== Location on the map ==
Sambalpur district lies between 20° 40' N and 22° 11' N latitude, 82° 39' E and 85° 15' E longitude, with a total area of 6,702 km^{2}.

== Surrounding districts ==
The district is surrounded by Deogarh district in the east, Bargarh and Jharsuguda districts in the west, Sundergarh district in the north, and Subarnpur and Angul districts in the South. Sambalpur is the district headquarters.

== Basic topography ==
The district has three distinctive physiographic units, namely, the Hilly Terrain of Bamra and Kuchinda in the north, plateau and ridges of Rairakhol in the south-east, and the valley and plains of Sambalpur Sub-division in the south east.

== Climate ==
Sambalpur district experiences an extreme type of climate, with 66 rainy days and 153 centimeters of rainfall on an average per annum. Most of the rainfall is confined to the months from June to October, visited by south west monsoon. Mercury rises up to 47 °C during May, with intolerable heat waves, and falls as low as 11.8 °C during December with extreme cold. The rainfall pattern is highly uneven and irregular.

== Rivers and forestation ==
The district forms a part of the Mahanadi River basin. The Mahanadi, the longest river of the state, enters into the district from the north-western border, where the famous Hirakud Multipurpose Dam Project is built. Other important rivers of the district are the Maltijor, the Harrad, the Kulsara, the Bheden, and the Phuljharan.

The district has a total forest area of 3986.27 km^{2} which accounts for 59.46% of the total area of the district. Total land under cultivation in the district is 173540 hectares.

== Accessibility and infrastructure ==
Presence of a number of streams without bridges cuts off the villages from the nearby roads. Consequently, most of the villages of the district are inaccessible during the rainy season.

The district is served by National Highway No.6, National Highway No.42, Major district roads and a section of South Eastern Railways. Rural electrification has been extended to 63.6% of the villages of the district. Telecommunication Network is not adequate to cater to the needs the people in the rural areas. Drinking water facilities are available in villages mostly from the sources of tubewells.
