= Seemanta Mahavidyalaya, Jharpokharia =

Seemanta Mahavidyalaya
- Logo of Seemanta Mahavidyalaya
- Motto: "Each one, Teach one"
- Type: Educational institution
- Established: 13th Aug, 1979
- Affiliations: UGC, NAAC
- Principal: Narendra Mohan Panda
- Faculty: 48 (on 05 September 2016)
- Administrative staff: 26 (on 05 September 2016)
- Students: 1696 (on 05 september 2016)
- Location: Jharpokharia, Odisha, India; 22.184973°N 86.647147°E
- Campus: Rural
- Website: www.seemantamahavidyalaya.org

Seemanta Mahavidyalaya (SMV) Jharpokharia is a constituent college of North Orissa University, Baripada . SMV is situated at Jharpokhoria village, 25 km from the heart of Mayurbhanj. It is located near the state border, hence named "Sīmānþa". The college provides leducation in science, commerce and arts stream to +2 science(Intermediate), Bachelor in science (BSc.) and arts (BA.) & vocational courses. Affiliation was obtained from Utkal University in 1980-81 for opening of intermediate class in Arts.

== See also ==
- University Grants Commission (India)
- Education in India
- Universities and colleges in India
- North Orissa University
- National Accreditation and Assessment Council
- Seemanta Engineering College
