= AH43 =

Road in Asia

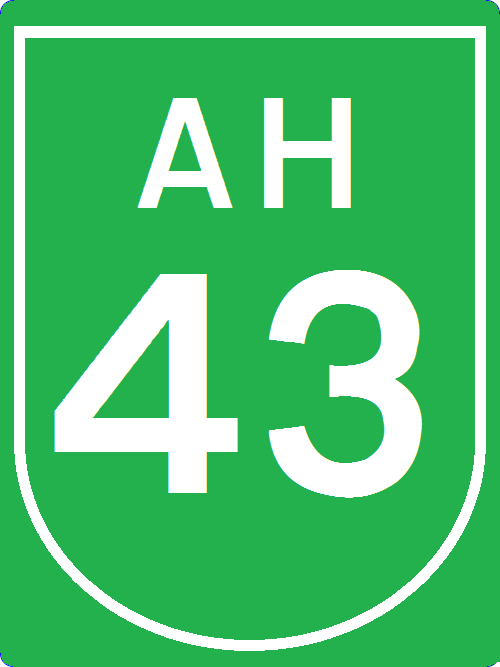
Asian Highway 43

Route information
- Length: 3,024 km (1,879 mi)

Major junctions
- North end: Agra, Uttar Pradesh
- AH46 Nagpur
- South end: Matara

Location
- Countries: India, Sri Lanka

Highway system
- Asian Highway Network
← AH42	→ AH44

Asian Highway 43 (AH43) is a route of the Asian Highway Network, running 3,024 kilometres (1,879 mi) from Asian Highway 1 in Agra, India to Matara in Sri Lanka.

== Route ==
It passes through Indian cities of Agra (AH1), Gwalior (AH47), Sagar, Nagpur (AH46), Hyderabad, Chikkaballapur and Bangalore (AH45, AH47), Madurai. The road briefly ends at Rameswaram before starting in Sri Lanka at Talaimannar and passes through Mannar, Anuradhapura, Dambulla (AH44), Kurunegala, Kandy, Colombo, Galle and Matara.

== India ==
Map of Asian Highway AH43 in red

The route shares some portions of various Indian National Highways. The route passes through Indian states of Uttar Pradesh, Rajasthan, Madhya Pradesh, Maharashtra, Telangana, Andhra Pradesh, Karnataka, and Tamil Nadu.

- NH 44 Agra to Madurai
- NH 85 Madurai to Manamadurai
- NH 87 Manamadurai to Dhanushkodi

== Sri Lanka ==
The route shares portions of the following Sri Lankan highways:

- A14
- A9
- A6
- A10
- A1 , The E04 serves as an alternate route for the AH43 on the A1 portion.
- A2 , The E01 serves as an alternate route for the AH43 on the A2 portion. Currently all these roads bear the national highways route signs, but have not yet been installed with AH43 route signs.

== Junctions ==
India
AH1 Agra
AH47 Gwalior
AH46 Nagpur
AH43 Bangalore
AH45 Krishnagiri
Sri Lanka
AH44 at Dambulla

== See also ==
- List of Asian Highways
- International E-road network
- Trans-African Highway network
