= AH44 =

Road in Asia

Asian Highway 44

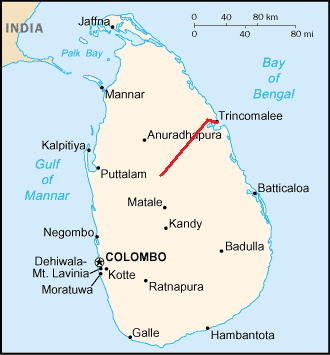

Route information
- Length: 107 km (66 mi)

Major junctions
- West end: Dambulla, Central Province
- East end: Trincomalee, Eastern Province

Location
- Countries: Sri Lanka

Highway system
- Asian Highway Network
← AH43	→ AH45

Asian Highway 44 or AH44 is a route of the Sri Lankan highway network, running 107 kilometres (66 mi) from Dambulla in Central Province to Trincomalee in Eastern Province. This route is composed of A6 Highway.

== Route ==
AH44 runs across three provinces of Sri Lanka and it is composed of only A6 Highway. The route is in three segments on A6.

- Dambulla - Habarana : 23 km (14 mi)
- Habarana - Kantale : 47 km (29 mi)
- Kantale - Trincomalee : 37 km (23 mi)

== Junctions ==
AH43 at Dambulla

== See also ==
- AH43
- List of Asian Highways
