= Basudeb Sudhal Deb =

Indian nobleman (1850-1903)

- Sir
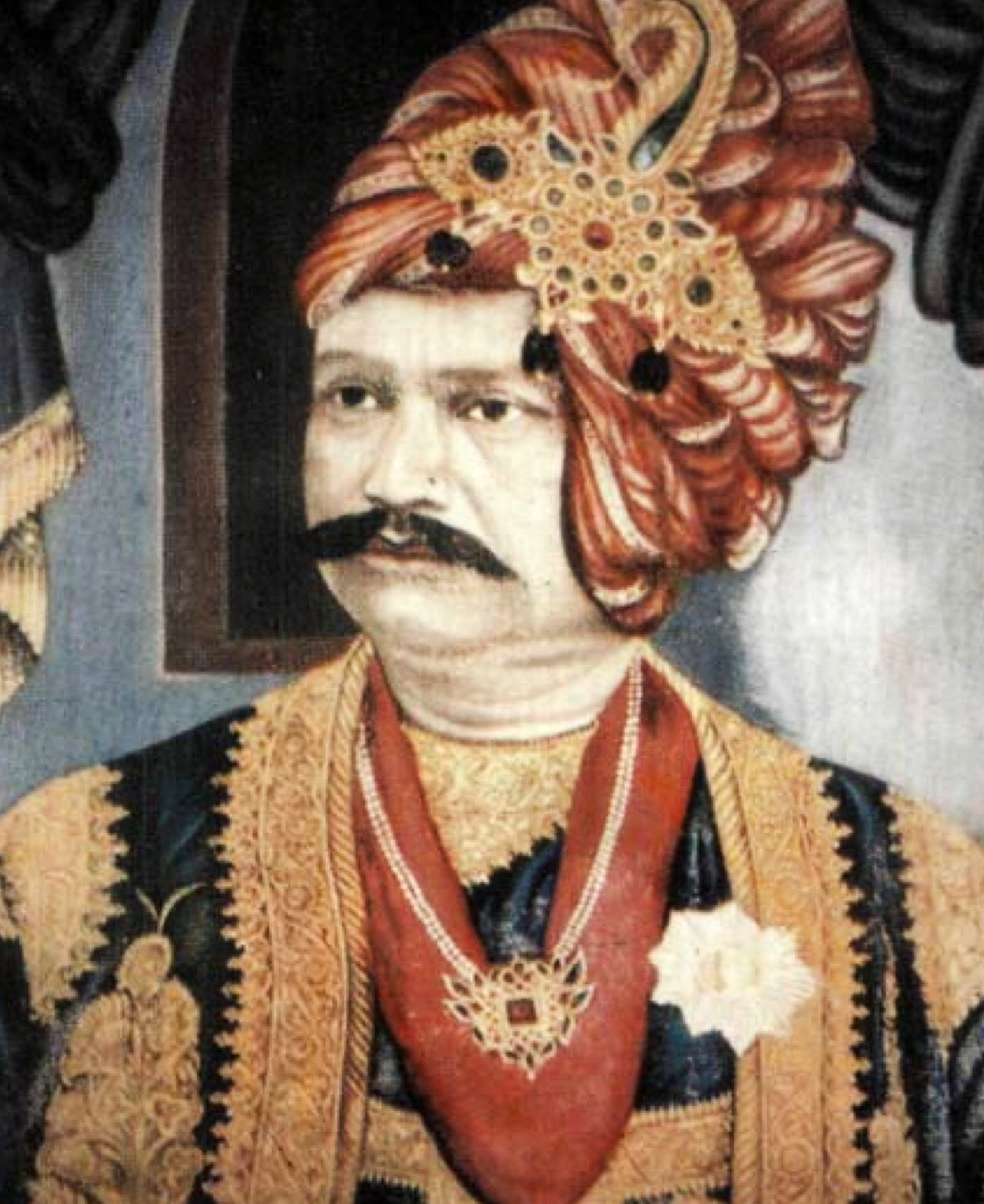
- Painting of Basudeb Sudhal Deb.
- Reign: 12 May 1869 CE – 19 November 1903 CE
- Predecessor: Brajasundar Deb
- Successor: Satchitananda Tribhuban Deb
- House: Eastern Ganga dynasty (Bamanda branch)
- Religion: Hinduism

Raja Sir Basudeb Sudhal Deb KCIE (16 May 1850 – 19 November 1903) was the Raja of Princely State of Bamra from 1869 to 1903. A member of the Ganga Dynasty, he is widely regarded as a pioneer of modernization in Odisha, introducing significant reforms in education, communication, and literature.

== Early life and education ==
Basudeb was born on 16 May 1850 to Harihar Deb. In 1865, he was adopted by his uncle, Raja Brajasundar Deb, who had no male heir. Following the death of Brajasundar on 12 May 1869, Basudeb ascended the throne of Bamra at the age of 19. He was well-versed in Sanskrit, Odia, and English, which influenced his later efforts to modernized his state's administration.

== Communication and Infrastructure ==
in 1900, Basudeb introduced a telephone line spanning 78 miles (126 km) between the capital, Deogarh, and Barkote. This made Bamra, the first princely state in India to utilize telephone technology. He also established a sophisticated postal system, issuing unique state-specific postage stamps and paper currency for local use.

== Education ==
Basudeb was an advocate for Western and classical education. He increased the number of primary schools in the state from a single institution to twenty-eight. In 1882, he founded the Raja Basu Dev High School in Deogarh, which was eventually affiliated with Calcutta University. He also established the "Ballam" agricultural laboratory to improve local farming techniques through scientific research.

== Literary and cultural contributions ==
Basudeb was a distinguished scholar and patron of the arts. In 1886, he established the Jagannath Ballay Press for the Odia literary revival. in 1889, he launched Sambalpur Hitaishini which provided a platform for Odia writers and played a crucial role in the movement to preserve the Odia language. Basudeb was also a poet and authored Chitrotpala and Janhamamu. His contributions to literature earned him the title of Vidvat Kula Kumuda from the scholarly community of Odisha.

== Honours ==
Basudeb was awarded several high ranking titles for his administrative excellence and loyalty to the British Crown such as:

- CIE: Companion of the Order of the Indian Empire (1889).
- KCIE: Knight Commander of the Order of the Indian Empire (1895).
- Raja: The title of "Raja" was formally recognized as a hereditary distinction for his family in 1891.

== Personal life and Death ==
He had four wives; his first marriage was to Rani Giriraj Kumari of Kalahandi in 1871. He fathered eight sons and eleven daughters.

Basudeb Sudhal Deb died in Calcutta on 19 November 1903. He was succeeded by his eldest son, Satchitananda Tribhuban Deb, who continued many of his father's modernization projects.
