= Bamra State =

Historical princely state of India

Coordinates: 21.53°N 84.73°E

Bamra State Bamanda State
- Princely state of British India
- 1360–1948
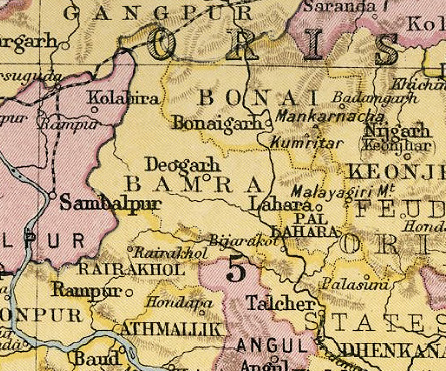
- Bamra State in the Imperial Gazetteer of India
- Capital: Debagarh
- Area
  - 1901: 5,149 km^{2} (1,988 sq mi)
- Population
  - 1901: 123,378
- History
  - Established: 1360
  - Accession to the Union of India: 1948
| Succeeded by |
| India |

Bamra State or Bamanda State, covering an area of 5,149 km^{2}, was one of the princely states of India during the British Raj. Its capital was in Debagarh (Deogarh). Bamra State acceded to India in 1948.

The state was located in a hilly area between the Mahanadi valley and the Chhota Nagpur Plateau. Most of its territory was forest, producing timber and lac but said to be rich in iron ore. The most important river was the Brahmani River. The state was one of the five Orissa Tributary States which were transferred from the Central Provinces to Bengal on the reconstitution of that province in October 1905. The capital is situated at Deogarh.

== History ==
As per the documents preserved by the courts and legends of the historical events, the first ruler of the Bamra state Saraju Gangadeb was the son of the local Eastern Ganga dynasty administrator of Patna region Hattahamir Deb, who was the son of Eastern Ganga ruler Bhanudeva II. Hattahamir Deb was overthrown in 1360 CE by Ramai Deva of the Chauhan dynasty who led the foundation of Patna state, while the tribal chieftains installed Saraju Gangadeb as the ruler in Tikilipada near Kuchinda and later the capital was shifted to Deogarh. This laid the foundation of the Bamanda branch of the Eastern Ganga dynasty.

The Bengal-Nagpur Railway passed through the northeastern part of Bamra, with two stations in the state: Bamra Road and Garpos. The state was under the political control of the Commissioner of the Chhattisgarh Division of the Central Provinces until 1905, under the Bengal Presidency until 1912, under the Bihar and Orissa Province until 1936 and under Orissa Province until it ceased to be a princely state. On 1 January 1948 Bamra's last princely ruler signed the accession to the Indian Union.

== Rulers ==
The rulers from the Bamanda branch of the Eastern Ganga dynasty:

- Saraju Gangadeb (1360 CE)
- Raj Narayan Deb
- Jagannath Deb
- Gangadhara Deb
- Jag Jyesthi Tribhuban Deb
- Rudranarayan Deb
- Kanphoda Sudhal Deb
- Raghunath Deb
- Kasturi Deb
- Ram Chandra Deb (1545–1578)
- Bikram Deb (1578–1625)
- Haru Deb (1625–1641)
- Chandra Sekhar (1641–1673)
- Bhagirath Deb (1673–1713)
- Pratap Deb (1713–1745)
- Sidasar Deb (1745–1779)
- Arjun Deb (1779–1819)
- Balunkabrusabha Deb (1819–1832)
- Khageswar Deb (1832)
- Brajasundar Deb (1832 – 12 May 1869)
- Basudeb Sudhal Deb (12 May 1869 – 19 November 1903)
- Satchitananda Tribhuban Deb (19 November 1903 – 11 March 1916)
- Dibyashankar Sudhal Deb (11 March 1916 – 1 January 1920)
- Bhanuganga Tribhuban Deb (1 January 1920 – 1 January 1948)

=== Titular ===
- Bhanuganga Tribhuban Deb (1 January 1948 – 1982)
- Pradipta Ganga Deb (1982–1997)
- Nitesh Ganga Deb (1997–present)

== See also ==
- Eastern States Agency
