= Kondaibari =

- town
- Location in Maharashtra, India
- Coordinates: 21°7′N 74°8′E
- Country: India
- State: Maharashtra
- District: Namdurbar
- Elevation: 196 m (643 ft)

Languages
  - Official: Marathi
- Time zone: UTC+5:30 (IST)

Kohdaibari is a small town in the Nandurbar district in Nashik division of Kandesh region of Maharashtra state in India. It is located on National Highway 6 running between Hazira (near Surat) in Gujarat to Kolkata, West Bengal.
