= Barkote =

- Town
- Location in Odisha, India Barkote (India)
- Coordinates: 21.55°N 85.01°E
- Country: India
- State: Odisha
- District: Debagarh
- Elevation: 126 m (413 ft)

Languages
  - Official: Odia
- Time zone: UTC+5:30 (IST)
- Vehicle registration: OD-28 (RTO Deogarh)
- Website: odisha.gov.in

Barkote is one of the largest blocks of the district Deogarh of the Indian State Odisha. Located on the bank of Bramhani River. It is the principal, commercial, cultural and Education centre of Deogarh. It was one of the oldest and reputed village of deogarh Now it is the major center for business. The population of this place with its suburbs is 12000. Many small villages constitutes this place like Danra, Basupali, Chakrapali, pichhula etc. This is the highest populous area of the district.

In the last 20th century after the creation of the rengali dam this place was created by the summation of small villages around the year 1985.

It is situated in the side of NH-6 which connect two major cities of India named as kolkota and Mumbai. The distance between this place and kolkata is 442 km and the distance between this place and Mumbai is 1552 km.

== Geography ==
Barkote is located at 21.55°N 85.01°E. It has an average elevation of 126 metres (413 feet).
