= Sansad Adarsh Gram Yojana =

Indian rural development programme

Sansad Adarsh Gram Yojana (SAGY)
- Country: India
- Prime Minister(s): Narendra Modi
- Launched: 11 October 2014; 11 years ago
- Status: Active
- Website: www.saanjhi.gov.in

Sansad Adarsh Gram Yojana (Hindi: सांसद आदर्श ग्राम योजना, abbr.: SAGY) is a rural development programme broadly focusing upon the development in the villages which includes social development, cultural development and spread motivation among the people on social mobilization of the village community. The programme was launched by the Prime Minister of India, Narendra Modi on the birth anniversary of Jayaprakash Narayan, on 11 October 2014.

The distinct feature of this Yojana is that it is (a) demand-driven, (b) inspired by society, and (c) based on people's participation.

== Objectives ==
Key objectives of the Yojana include:

1. The development of model villages, called Adarsh Grams, through the implementation of existing schemes, and certain new initiatives to be designed for the local context, which may vary from village to village.
2. Creating models of local development which can be replicated in other villages.

== The plan ==
Sansad Adarsh Gram Yojana was initiated to bring the member of parliament of all the political parties under the same umbrella while taking the responsibility of developing physical and institutional infrastructure in villages and turning them into model villages. Under this yojana, each member of parliament needs to choose one village each from the constituency that they represent, except their village or their in-laws village and fix parameters and make it a model village by 2019.

Thereafter, they can take on two or three more villages and follow the same approach by the time the next general elections come along in 2019, and subsequently, set themselves ten-year village or rural improvement projects. Villages will be offered smart schools, universal access to basic health facilities and Pucca housing to homeless villagers.

== Funding ==
No new funds are allocated to this Yojana, and funds may be raised through:

1. Funds from existing schemes, such as the Indira Awas Yojana, Pradhan Mantri Gram Sadak Yojana, Mahatma Gandhi National Rural Employment Guarantee Scheme, and Backward Regions Grant Fund, etc..
2. The Member of Parliament Local Area Development Scheme (MPLADS),
3. The gram panchayat's revenue,
4. Central and State Finance Commission Grants, and
5. Corporate Social Responsibility funds.

== Roles and responsibilities of key functionaries ==
Level	Functionary	Key roles and responsibilities
National	Member of Parliament	Identify the Adarsh Gram; Facilitate the planning process; Mobilise additional funds; Monitor the scheme
	Two committees, headed by the Minister of Rural Development and the Secretary, Rural Development, respectively.*	Monitor the process of identification and planning; Review the implementation of the scheme; Identify bottlenecks in the scheme; Issue operational guidelines; Indicate specific resource support which each Ministry can provide
State	A committee headed by the Chief Secretary	Supplement the central guidelines for the scheme; Review Village Development Plans; Review implementation; Outline monitoring mechanisms; Design a grievance redressal mechanism for the scheme
District	District Collector	Conduct the baseline survey; Facilitate the preparation of the Village Development Plan; Converge relevant schemes; Ensure grievance redressal; Monthly progress review of the scheme
Village	Gram Panchayat and functionaries of schemes (at various levels)	Implementation of the scheme; Identify common needs of the village; Leverage resources from various programmes; Ensure participation in the scheme

== Strategies ==
To convert the identified village into an Adarsh Gram through the specified activities, the following are the possible strategies:

1. Entry point activities to energise and mobilise the community towards positive common action
2. Participatory planning exercise for identifying people’s needs and priorities in an integrated manner
3. Converging resources from Central Sector and Centrally Sponsored Schemes, and also other State schemes to the extent possible.
4. Repairing and renovating existing infrastructure to the extent possible.
5. Strengthening the Gram Panchayats and people’s institutions within them
6. Promoting transparency and accountability

== Adopted Villages ==
List of a few important adoptions:

- Under the scheme, Prime Minister Narendra Modi has adopted Jayapur village his constituency Varanasi in Uttar Pradesh. PM Modi has adopted 6 villages as of now. His first four villages were Jayapur, Nagepur, Kakrahia and Domari. Recently, PM Modi adopted 2 more villages, Poore Bariyarpur and Parampur.
- Vikram Usendi has adopted Kapsi village in his Kanker Lok Sabha constituency in Chhattisgarh.
- Y. S. Chowdary has adopted Ponnavaram village in Krishna district in Andhra Pradesh.
- Sonia Gandhi adopted Udwa village in her constituency Rae Bareli in Uttar Pradesh.
- Rahul Gandhi adopted Deeh village in his constituency Amethi in Uttar Pradesh.
- V. K. Singh adopted Mirpur Hindu in his constituency Ghaziabad, Uttar Pradesh.
- Ahmed Patel adopted Vandari village in Rajpipada, Gujarat.
- Sachin Tendulkar adopted Puttamraju vari Kandriga(P.R.Kandriga) a village near Gudur in Nellore district of Andhra Pradesh. And Donja village in Osmanabad district of Marathwada, Maharastra.
- Harish Dwivedi adopted Amorha Khas village in Basti district, Uttar Pradesh.
- Kamal Nath adopted Bisapur Kalan village in Chhindwara district, Madhya Pradesh.

== Performance ==
Under Phase 1 (2014–16) of the scheme, nearly 500 out of 543 Lok Sabha MPs and 203 out of 253 Rajya Sabha MPs adopted the village. In Phase 2 (2016–18), the number dipped to 326 Lok Sabha MPs and 121 Rajya Sabha MPs adopting the village. The numbers dipped further in Phase 3 (2017–19). As of February 2018, only 97 Lok Sabha MPs and 27 Rajya Sabha MPs had adopted the village.
