= Ner Dhule =

Village in Maharashtra

Ner Dhule Ner
- village
- Location in Maharashtra, India Ner Dhule (India)
- Coordinates: 20°56′33″N 74°30′51″E
- Country: India
- State: Maharashtra
- District: Dhule
- Talukas: Dhule

Languages
  - Official: Marathi
- Time zone: UTC+5:30 (IST)
- PIN: 424303
- Vehicle registration: MH 18

Pandhari Mahal a village standing on the Panjhara River in Dhule district of Maharashtra state in India.

== Location ==
Ner lies about 22.53 km. (14 miles) west of Dhule. National Highway 6 (NH 6) passes through Ner.

== History ==
Ner had been a part of Khandesh region since the time of the Faruqi Kings. The Mughal emperor Akbar had made Ner the headquarters of a mahal in the Sarkar of Nandurbar with an annual revenue of 7,22,760 daams. Traces of its former consequence are seen in the Muhammedan tombs that still line the main road leading into the village. It, along with the neighbouring villages, suffered much during the 1872 floods of Panjhara.

== Economy ==
Most of the economy is agriculture related. Vegetables grown in the village are sold in the markets of Surat, Nasik and Mumbai. Crops such as Millet, Chilli, Groundnuts, Sugarcane, Gram, Cotton, Wheat, Jowar, etc. are also grown. In ner the great manopanchit parshvnath Jain temple, a 100 years old Jain temple and statue of manopanchit parshvnath is only the statue in India out of 108 parshvnath gods.

== Administration ==
Ner has as Village Gram Panchayat for day-to-day administration. The District Zilla Panchayat headquarters is at Dhule and the Block Panchayat is also at Dhule.

Ner has one branch of Central Bank of India & Dhule District Central Co-operative bank.

== See also ==
- Dhule City
- Dhule District
- List of districts of Maharashtra
- Khandesh
