= AH47 =

Road in Asia

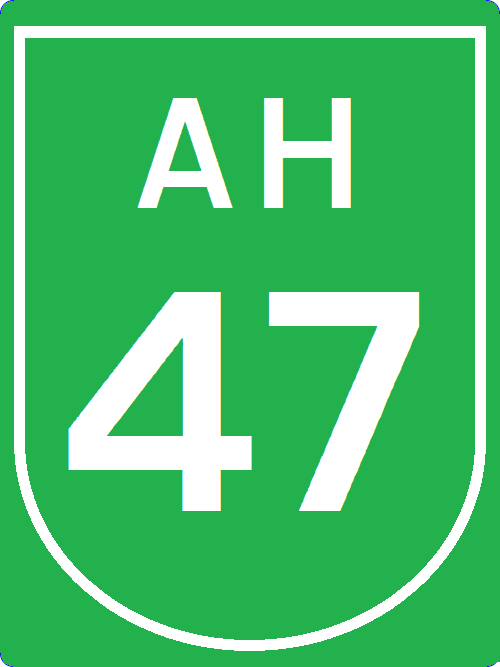
Asian Highway 47

Route information
- Length: 2,124 km (1,320 mi)

Major junctions
- North end: Agra
- AH46 Dhule
- South end: Mumbai

Location
- Countries: India

Highway system
- Asian Highway Network
← AH46	→ AH48

Asian Highway 47 (AH47) is a route of the Asian Highway Network, running 2,124 kilometres (1,320 mi) from AH43 in Agra, India to AH43 in Mumbai, India.It passes through the Indian cities of Agra, Gwalior (AH43), Indore, Dhule (AH46), and Thane, Mumbai (AH43).

== Route ==
The route shares portions of Indian National Highways many NH highway road Various cities and towns in the Indian states of Uttar Pradesh, Rajasthan, Madhya Pradesh and Maharashtra situated on AH47 are listed.

=== Uttar Pradesh ===
- Agra

=== Rajasthan ===
Dholpur

=== Madhya Pradesh ===
- Gwalior
- Shivpuri
- Guna
- Biaora
- Pachore
- Shajapur
- Dewas
- Indore
- Pithampur
- Khalghat
- Julwania
- Sendhwa

=== Maharashtra ===
- Shirpur
- Dhule on Asian Highway 46
- Nashik
- Thane
- Mumbai

== See also ==
- AH43
- AH45
- AH46
