= AH46 =

Road in Asia

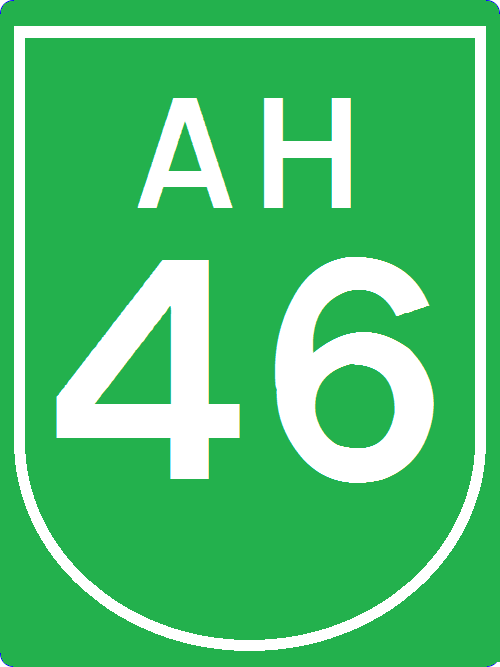
Asian Highway 46

Route information
- Length: 1,890 km (1,170 mi)

Major junctions
- East end: Kolkata, West Bengal
- West end: Surat, Gujarat

Location
- Countries: India

Highway system
- Asian Highway Network
← AH45	→ AH47

Asian Highway 46 (AH46) is a route of the Asian Highway Network within India, from Kolkata in West Bengal to Surat in Gujarat. The route is part of old National Highway 6.

This highway connects Surat-Bardoli-Dhule-Jalgaon-Akola-Amravati-Nagpur-Bhandara-Durg-Bhilai-Raipur-Saraipali-Bargarh-Sambalpur-Debagarh-Kendujhar-Baharagora-Kharagpur-Kolkata.

== Route in India ==
Length of AH46 is 1514 km. Various cities and towns in the Indian states of West Bengal, Jharkhand, Odisha, Chhattisgarh and Maharashtra lie on AH46 as follows:

=== West Bengal State ===
- Kolkata
- Kharagpur

=== Odisha State ===
- Bargarh
- Sambalpur
- Bangriposi
- Jharpokharia, Baripada
- Kendujhargarh
- Debagarh

=== Chhattisgarh State ===
- Saraipali
- Raipur
- Bhilai
- Rajnandgaon

=== Maharashtra State ===
- Bhandara
- Nagpur
- Amravati
- Akola
- Khamgaon
- Nandura
- Malkapur
- Bhusawal
- Jalgaon
- Dhule

=== Gujarat State ===
- Bardoli
- Surat

== Constituent highways ==
AH46 is located entirely within India. National highways have been renumbered since 2010.

=== New numbered highways ===
- Kharagpur - Deogarh section is part of National Highway 49 (India)
- Deogarh - Dhule section is part of National Highway 53 (India)

=== Old numbers ===
Under old numbers, AH46 was part of old NH6 India.

== Junctions ==
AH45 near Kharagpur, starting point.
AH43 near Nagpur.
AH47 near Dhule, end point.
