= Dahivel =

Village in Maharashtra

- village
- Location in Maharashtra, India Dahivel (India)
- Coordinates: 21°04′N 74°10′E
- Country: India
- State: Maharashtra
- Region: North Maharashtra
- Division: Nashik
- District: Dhule
- Talukas: Sakri
- Elevation: 550 m (1,800 ft)

Population
  - Total: 12,000 (2,011)

Languages
  - Official: Marathi
- Time zone: UTC+5:30 (IST)
- PIN: 424304
- Telephone code: 02561
- Vehicle registration: MH-18
- Coastline: 0 kilometres (0 mi)
- Lok Sabha constituency: Nandurbar

Dahivel is a town in Sakri Tehsil (Taluka), in Dhule District of the Indian state of Maharashtra, on National Highway 6 (National Highway 6).
