= National Highway 143 (India) =

National highway in India

National Highway 143
- Map of National Highway 143 in red

Route information
- Auxiliary route of NH 43

Major junctions
- From: Gumla, Jharkhand
- To: Barkote, Odisha

Location
- Country: India

Highway system
- Roads in India; Expressways; National; State; Asian
← NH 43	→ NH 49

National Highway 143 (Previously NH23) is a national highway of India. This highway runs from Gumla in the state of Jharkhand to Barkote in Odisha. This is a daily communication road to Bhubaneswar from Rourkela, in Sundergarh district. It is also known as Ranchi-Rourkela Road. It also runs through Simdega district in Jharkhand.

The construction of a second bridge on National Highway-143 over Brahmani river was completed by 2023. Land acquisition for widening of NH143 between Barkote & Biramitrapur started in 2013.

== Route ==
The Highway starts from Gumla in Gumla District of Jharkhand on the NH 43, going through Kolebira, Simdega in Simdega District of Jharkhand, enters into Birmitrapur, Rourkela, Lahunipada in Sundergarh District of Odisha & ends in Barkote in Deogarh District of Odisha on NH 49 covering a distance of 256.9 kilometres (159.6 mi). It also goes through Sundergarh district in Odisha, which leads to Khandadhar waterfalls.
