= Jayapur =

- Village
- Sansad Adarsh Gram under the constituency of Indian Prime Minister
- Location in Varanasi, Uttar Pradesh, India Jayapur (India)
- Coordinates: 25.2163225°N 82.8232959°E
- Country: India
- State: Uttar Pradesh
- District: Varanasi
- Assembly segment: Sevapuri
- Block: Aaraji Line
- Gram panchayat code: 74

Government
  - Body: Gram panchayat
  - Gram Pradhan: Raj Kumar Yadav
  - Ex-Gram Pradhan: Narayan Singh Patel

Population
  - Total: 4,200

Languages
  - Official: Hindi and Bhojpuri
- Time zone: UTC+5:30 (IST)
- PIN: 221305
- Telephone code: +91-0542
- Sex ratio: 1000/944♂/♀
- Avg. annual temperature: 26 °C (79 °F)
- Avg. summer temperature: 40 °C (104 °F)
- Avg. winter temperature: 18 °C (64 °F)

Jayapur is a village in Rajatalab tehsil, Varanasi district of Uttar Pradesh, India. It is about 28 km from the Varanasi cantt railway station and about 7 km from the Rajatalab railway station in the Sevapuri assembly segment and Aaraji Line Block. This place is situated at the border of the Varanasi District and Mirzapur District. Jayapur is surrounded by Arajiline Tehsil towards the east and Shikhar Tehsil towards the south.

The nearby villages to Jayapur are Chandapur (1 km), Panchai (1 km), Jakhini (3 km), Singhai (1 km), Narsara (2 km), Marui (2 km), Gotva (1 km), and Jamua (5 km).

The village comes under the constituency of Indian Prime Minister Narendra Modi, who adopted the village on 7 November 2014 under the Sansad Adarsh Gram Yojana ("MP's model village scheme"). The village was already adopted by the Rashtriya SwayamSevak Sangh (RSS) under its ideal village scheme in 2002.

== History ==
According to the ancestors of this village, Jayapur is nearly 400 years old. According to BHU's political science department's HoD, Prof KK Mishra, in the 17th century, when the Mughal emperor Aurangzeb was said to be on a temple-demolition spree, his soldiers caught attention of an old temple of Lord Hanuman in the village.

== Population ==
The total population of this village is around 4200 and there are a total of 401 houses.

== Demographics ==
The literacy rate of this village is 76.36 per cent (among men, 89.12 per cent; among women, 61.27 per cent).

== Divisions ==
There are four villages in Jayapaur panchayat: Jayapur, Manikpur, Musepur and Jayapur (donwar k pura).

== Languages ==
Hindi and Bhojpuri are spoken in Jayapur village and written in Devanagari scripts.
