= Khapa =

- city
- Location in Maharashtra, India
- Coordinates: 20.92°N 78.95°E
- Country: India
- State: Maharashtra
- District: Nagpur
- Elevation: 274 m (899 ft)

Population (2011)
  - Total: 14,659

Languages
  - Official: Marathi
- Time zone: UTC+5:30 (IST)
- Website: www.khapamahaulb.maharashtra.gov.in

Khapa is a city and a municipal council in Nagpur district in the Indian state of Maharashtra.

== Geography ==
Khapa is located at 20.92°N 78.95°E. It has an average elevation of 274 metres (898 feet).

== Demographics ==
As of 2001 India census, Khapa had a population of 14,972. Males constitute 51% of the population and females 49%. Khapa has an average literacy rate of 72%, higher than the national average of 59.5%: male literacy is 80%, and female literacy is 64%. In Khapa, 12% of the population is under 6 years of age. Khapa is based on Kanhan River.

Year	Male	Female	Total Population	Change	Religion (%)							
Year	Male	Female	Total Population	Change	Hindu	Muslim	Christian	Sikhs	Buddhist	Jain	Other religions and persuasions	Religion not stated
2001	7599	7373	14972	-	86.147	5.884	0.220	0.007	7.080	0.220	0.434	0.007
2011	7449	7210	14659	-2.091	85.545	6.569	0.150	0.000	7.497	0.205	0.034	0.000
