= Debagarh =

City in Odisha, India

Debagarh Deogarh
- town
- Deogarh
- Nickname: Bamanda
- Location in Odisha, India Debagarh (India)
- Coordinates: 21.53°N 84.73°E
- Country: India
- State: Odisha
- District: Deogarh
- Established: 1 January 1994
- Founder: Government of Odisha

Government
  - Body: Debagarh Municipality
- Elevation: 192 m (630 ft)

Population (2011)
  - Total: 52,390

Languages
  - Official: Odia, English
- Time zone: UTC+5:30 (IST)
- PIN: 768108
- Vehicle registration: OD-28
- UN/LOCODE: IN DEB
- Nearest city(s): Sambalpur, Rourkela, Angul & Bhubaneswar
- Website: http://deogarh.nic.in

Debagarh (formerly Deogarh), is a city in Odisha state of eastern India. Located in the north-western region of the state, it is the headquarters of Debagarh district that was created on 1 January 1994, after being bifurcated from Sambalpur District.

== Geography ==
Debagarh is located at 21.53°N 84.73°E. It has an average elevation of 192 m (630 ft).

Debagarh is located between 21° 31′ 53″ N Latitude and 84° 43′ 2″ E Longitude. Deogarh Town is 90 km to the east of Sambalpur City on N.H-6. National Highway No.6 passes through the district acts as the main artery of inter-regional trade and other links.

== History ==
Debagarh or Deogarh is the former capital of Bamanda or Bamra princely state of British India. The king of this princely state belongs to Ganga vamsi dynasty and one of the extended royal family of Gajapati emperor of Odisha.

Raja Shri Basudeb Sudhal Deb (1869–1903) was an enlightened ruler, he did much to further conditions in princely state and for the cause of Odia nationalism. His contribution was more towards Literature, Education and Art. He established an educational institution, which is currently well known as Raja Basu Dev High School. His son had equally contributed to the social, cultural and scientific development of Debagarh. Bamanda was the first princely state to introduce postal, telegraph and electricity in India. Currently Odia sahitya is actively inspiring and promoting local talent in the field of art and literature. A beautiful waterfall PRADHANPAT decorates the town and supply the clean drinking water to the citizen. Pradhanpat ustav is celebrated annually near the fall.

Bamanda–the citadel of creative artists dates back to 5th century A.D. when Mathara Royal Family was at the helm of the Administration. After this dynasty, Ganga Rulers came into power and established their capital at Deogarh. Deogarh attained all-round prosperity during the reign of Raja Basudev Sudhal Dev, the most enlightened rulers of this clan. A new horizon was innovated in the field of communication by the foundation of Jagannath Ballav press in 1886 and publication of a weekly magazine the "Sambalpur Hitaishini" in 1889. It was during his rule that the jail, police station, post offices, Dispensaries were established and irrigation system was introduced. He had a telephone line of 78 Miles connecting Bamara and Barkote in 1900 was the longest in India during that period. Bamanda's own postal system was very developed. It got affiliated to the British Postal system in 1895. Sir Sudhal Dev, the then King of Bamanda had coined and issued postage stamps in his own Kingdom. He had promulgated paper currency also in his state.

After him, his illustrious son Raja Sachidananda Tribhuban Dev undertook the improvement activities of the erstwhile estate. The most outstanding developmental activities was the introduction of the hydro-electric system in Kurdkot water fall by which the Palace, cloth loom, Sugar factory established in 1908 at Rambhei got power supply. During the reign of Bhanuganga Tribhuban Dev, the estate of Bamra was merged with Odisha i.e. on 1 January 1948 and it became a part of the District of Sambalpur.

== Transportation ==
1. Air: – The nearest airports for visiting places of interest in Debagarh District are at Bhubaneswar (265 km), Raipur (376 km) and Jharsuguda (98 km) .

2. Rail: - The nearest rail heads for Debagarh are at Sambalpur (90 km), Bamanda on the Rourkela-Jharsuguda section of Howrah-Mumbai line (103 km), Jharsuguda (98 km) and Rourkela (115 km)

3. Road: - Debagarh is connected with NH6 (Part of AH46) (Mumbai-Kolkata) and NH200 (Raipur-Chandikhole).The city is 90 km from Sambalpur, 115 km from Rourkela and 265 km from Bhubaneswar.

== Demographics ==
As of 2011 India census, Debagarh had a population of 52,390. Males constitute 52% of the population and females 48%. Debagarh has an average literacy rate of 67%, higher than the national average of 59.5%: male literacy is 74% and, female literacy is 59%. In the town, 12% of the population is under 6 years of age.

== Politics ==
Current MP from Deogarh Sh.Nitesh Ganga Deb of Bharatiya Janata Party who won the seat in State elections of 2014 to previous MLAs from this seat include, Sh. Sanjib Pradhan of Biju Janata Dal in 2009, Sh.Nitish chandra ganga dev of congress who won this seat in 2004, Sh.Shubash ch. Panigrahi of BJP in 2000 and a byelection prior to it Pradipta Ganga Deb of JD in 1995 and in 1990, Raj Kishore Pradhan of INC in 1985, Ashwini Kumar Behera of INC(I) in 1980, and Bhanu Ganga Tribhuban Deb of JNP in 1977.

Deogarh is part of Deogarh (Lok Sabha constituency).
