= AH45 =

Road in India

Asian Highway 45
- Map of Asian Highway AH45 in red

Route information
- Length: 2,116.00 km (1,314.82 mi) West Bengal: 206 km (128 mi) Odisha: 523 km (325 mi); Andhra Pradesh: 992.25 km (616.56 mi) Tamil Nadu: 394.75 km (245.29 mi)

Major junctions
- North end: Kolkata, West Bengal
- AH46 Kharagpur, Vishakhapatnam, Bhubaneswar, Bhadrak, Kolkata
- South end: Krishnagiri, Tamil Nadu

Location
- Country: India

Highway system
- Roads in India; Expressways; National; State; Asian
← AH44	→ AH46

AH45 is a route of the National Highway Network of India, running 2,116 kilometres (1,315 mi) from in Kolkata to Krishnagiri. This route is composed of NH 16 and part of NH 48 from Chennai to Krishnagiri.

== Route ==
The route shares a large portion of various Indian National Highways; namely NH 16 and NH 48.

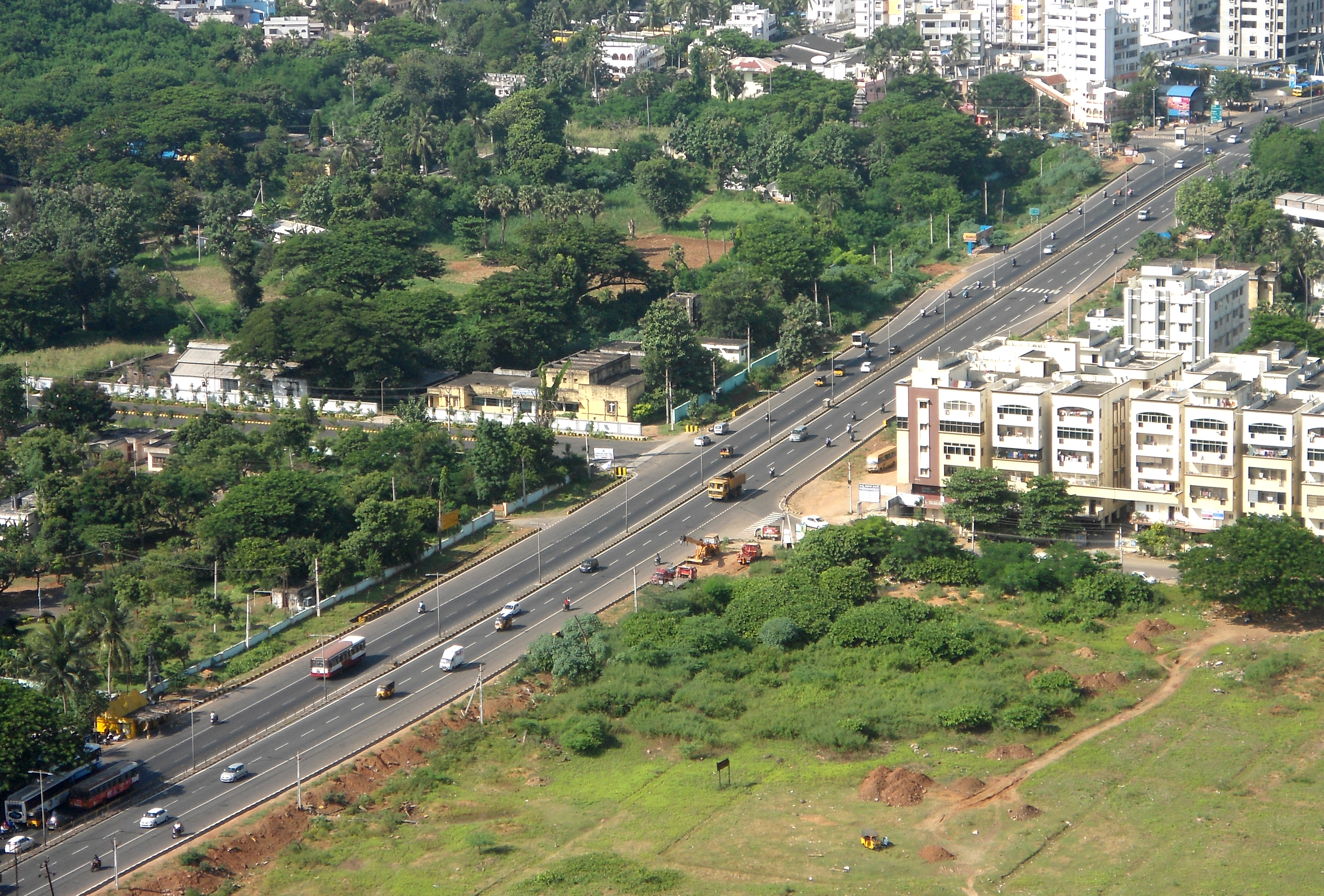
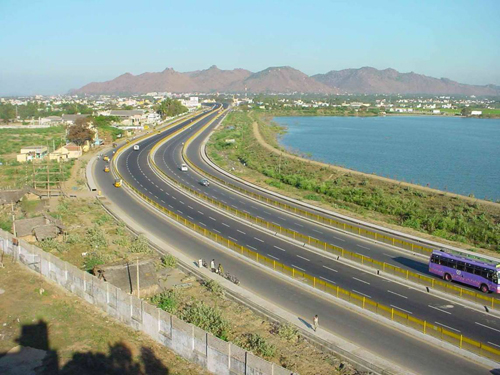
Left: NH 16 a part of Asian Highway 45 at Visakhapatnam;
Right: NH 16 a part of Asian Highway 45 in Tamil Nadu

It passes through Berhampur, Bhubaneswar, Cuttack, Jajpur, Bhadrak, Balasore, Baripada and ends at Jharpokharia, where it meets NH 16 in Odisha. In Andhra Pradesh, it passes through most of the coastal towns in ten coastal districts and covers the cities of Srikakulam, Vizianagaram, Visakhapatnam, Tuni, Rajahmundry, Kovvur, Eluru, Vijayawada, Mangalagiri, Guntur, Chilakaluripet, Ongole and Nellore. In Tamil Nadu, it passes through Gummidipundi in Tiruvallur district and enters Chennai.

NH 16 has a total length of 1,764 km (1,096 mi) and passes through the states of West Bengal, Odisha, Andhra Pradesh and Tamil Nadu.

Route length in states:

- West Bengal: 206 km (128 mi)
- Odisha: 523 km (325 mi)
- Andhra Pradesh: 992.25 km (616.56 mi)
- Tamil Nadu: 42.75 km (26.56 mi)

NH 48 has a total length of 352 km (219 mi) and passes through the state of Tamil Nadu connecting Chennai & Krishnagiri near Karnataka Border.
