= Jharpokharia =

Jharpokharia Bombay Chhaka
- Village
- Nickname: Bombay Chhaka
- Location in Odisha, India Jharpokharia (India)
- Coordinates: 22.17°N 86.63°E
- Country: India
- State: Odisha
- District: Mayurbhanj

Government
  - Type: Gram Panchayat
- Elevation: 130 m (430 ft)

Languages
  - Official: Odia
- Time zone: UTC+5:30 (IST)
- Vehicle registration: OD 11
- Website: odisha.gov.in

Jharpokharia (colloquially known as Bombay Chhaka) is a small village in Mayurbhanj district of the Indian state of Odisha and located at the junction of National Highway 6 and National Highway 16. It is 30 km from Baripada, the district headquarters of the Mayurbhanj district, and is home to the Seemanta Institute of Pharmaceutical Sciences, Seemanta Engineering College, and Seemanta Mahavidyalaya. It is colloquially known as Bombay Chhack because it is at the junction of roads leading to Bombay, Calcutta.

== Geography ==
Jharpokharia is located at 22.17°N 86.63°E. It has an average elevation of 130 m (430 ft).
