= Debagarh district =

Debagarh district Deogada district
- District of Odisha
- Debagada district
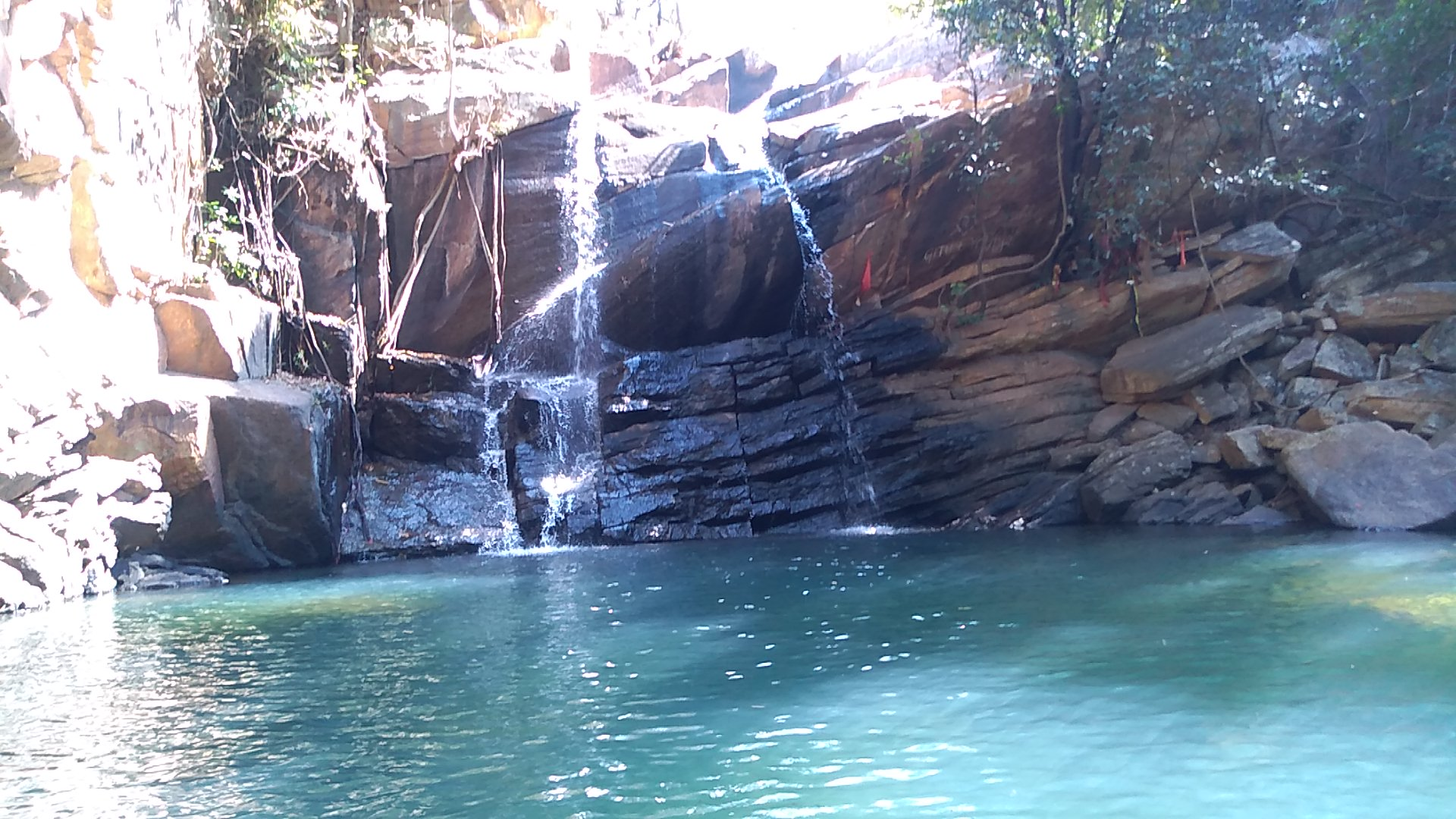
- Deojharan waterfall
- Interactive map of Debagarh district
- Coordinates: 21.533°N 84.733°E
- Country: India
- State: Odisha
- Established: 1 January 1994
- Headquarters: Debagarh

Government
  - Collector: Somesh Kumar Upadhyay IAS

Area
  - Total: 2,781.66 km^{2} (1,074.00 sq mi)
  - Land: 2,150 km^{2} (830 sq mi)

Population (2011)
  - Total: 312,520
  - Rank: 30
  - Density: 106/km^{2} (270/sq mi)

Languages
  - Official: Odia, English
  - Local: Munda, Kurukh
- Time zone: UTC+5:30 (IST)
- PIN: 768108
- Vehicle registration: OD-28
- Sex ratio: 976 ♂/♀
- Literacy: 73.07%
- Vidhan Sabha constituency: 1, Deogarh
- Climate: Aw (Köppen)
- Precipitation: 1,014.2 millimetres (39.93 in)
- Website: www.deogarh.nic.in

Debagarh district, officially Debagada district , also known as Deogarh district, is a district of Odisha state, India. Located in the north-western part of the state, it is one of Odisha's 30 administrative districts and has its headquarters at Debagarh (Deogarh) town.

The district covers an area of 2781.66 km^{2} and has a population of 312,520 (2011 Census). As of 2011, it is the least populous district of Odisha (out of 30).

== History ==
The district was created on 1 January 1994 by bifurcating the erstwhile Sambalpur district. It is domiciled by both tribal and non-tribal people in almost equal proportion.

Deogarh is the former capital of Bamanda or Bamra princely state of British India. The king of this princely state belongs to Ganga vamsi dynasty and one of the extended royal family of Gajapati emperor of Odisha.

Raja Shri Basudeb Sudhal Deb (1869–1903) was an enlightened ruler, he did much to further conditions in princely state and for the cause of Oriya nationalism. His contribution was more towards Literature, Education and Art. He established an educational institution, which is currently well known as Raja Basu Dev High School. His son had equally contributed to the social, cultural and scientific development of Deogarh. Bamanda was the first princely state to introduce postal, telegraph and electricity in India.

Bamanda is a citadel of creative artists which dates back to 5th century A.D. when Mathara Royal Family was at the helm of the Administration. After this dynasty, Ganga Rulers came into power and established their capital at Deogarh. Deogarh attained all-round prosperity during the reign of Raja Basudev Sudhal Dev, the most enlightened rulers of this clan. A new horizon was innovated in the field of communication by the foundation of Jagannath Ballav press in 1886 and publication of a weekly magazine the "Sambalpur Hitaishini" in 1889. It was during his rule that the jail, police station, post offices, Dispensaries were established and irrigation system was introduced. He had a telephone line of 78 Miles connecting Bamara and Barkote in 1900 was the longest in India during that period. Bamanda's own postal system was very developed. It got affiliated to the British Postal system in 1895. Sir Sudhal Dev, the then King of Bamanda had coined and issued postage stamps in his own Kingdom. He had promulgated paper currency also in his state.

After him, his son Raja Sachidananda Tribhuban Dev undertook the improvement activities of the erstwhile estate. He introduced a hydro-electric system in Kodarkot Waterfall by which the palace, cloth loom, and sugar factory got power supply. During the reign of Bhanuganga Tribhuban Dev, the estate of Bamra was merged with Odisha i.e. on 1 January 1948 and it became a part of the District of Sambalpur.

== Geography ==
Facts and Figures
Date of formation	1 January 1994
Area	2781.66 km^{2}
Forest Land	1560.22 km^{2}
Population(2001)	2,74,095
Males	1,38,913
Females	1,35,182
Population density	93 per km^{2}
Sex Ratio	980 females per 1000 males
Literacy Rate	60.78%
No. of Sub-Division	1
No. of Tehsil	1
No. of Blocks	3
No. of Villages	7744
Average rainfall	1014.2 mm
Postal Code	768108
STD Code	06641

The district consists mainly of hills. The hill system of Deogarh has been categorised mainly under four ranges:

1. The Khajuria Range on the north running from west–east in Badbar-Pragana of Deogarh police station having a maximum height of 745 metres.
2. The Pradhanpat and Kaidanta Ranges having maximum height of 743 metres and 816 metres on the North.
3. The Pawri Range on the eastern side of the Brahmani River which is 678 Metres in height.
4. The Ushakothi Range in Kansar & Reamal police stations. The hill ranges have elevation ranging from 610 metres to 762 metres from the mean sea level.

The soil groups of this district are mainly sandy, loamy soil and red soil.

== Economy ==
In 2006 the Ministry of Panchayati Raj named Debagarh one of the country's 250 most backward districts (out of a total of 640). It is one of the 19 districts in Odisha receiving funds from the Backward Regions Grant Fund Programme (BRGF). Since it is an industry less district the people depend solely upon agriculture. It is a part of the Red Corridor.

Major Upcoming Industrial Projects in Debagada district are

1. NLC India Limited Thermal Power Plant: A massive 3,200 MW thermal power plant approved with an investment of ₹34,763.51 crore, expected to generate around 4,100 jobs.
2. Shree Ram Iron and Alloys Pellet Plant: A ₹250 crore investment to set up a 0.8 MTPA iron pellet manufacturing plant in the district.
3. Jindal Green PSP Two Pumped Storage Project: A clearance for a ₹3,711 crore pumped-storage green energy and hydropower project.
4. Petronet LNG Compressed Biogas Plant: A compressed biogas and fermented organic manure plant approved to utilize organic resources locally.
5. Nuclear Power Feasibility: Deogarh has also been shortlisted by NTPC for conducting feasibility studies for prospective nuclear energy infrastructure.

Debagada has been included as a key anchoring district in the newly announced Sambalpur industrial expansion corridor, backed by massive regional investments to drive local job creation.

=== Tourism ===
The government has undertaken a number of efforts to support tourism in the district, based on its natural environment and cultural heritage.There are a number of tourists places listed on the official district website.

== Demographics ==
Historical population
Year	Pop.	±% p.a.
1901	59,882	—
1911	69,341	+1.48%
1921	72,488	+0.44%
1931	81,007	+1.12%
1941	91,241	+1.20%
1951	98,769	+0.80%
1961	122,634	+2.19%
1971	163,243	+2.90%
1981	197,671	+1.93%
1991	234,238	+1.71%
2001	274,108	+1.58%
2011	312,520	+1.32%

Religions in Debagarh district (2011)
Religion	Percent
Hinduism	94.71%
Christianity	4.65%
Other or not stated	0.64%

According to the 2011 census Debagarh district has a population of 312,520, roughly equal to the nation of Iceland. This gives it a ranking of 571st in India (out of a total of 640). The district has a population density of 106 inhabitants per square kilometre (270/sq mi). Its population growth rate over the decade 2001-2011 was 13.88%. Debagarh has a sex ratio of 976 females for every 1000 males, and a literacy rate of 73.07%. 7.16% of the population lives in urban areas. Scheduled Castes and Scheduled Tribes make up 16.67% and 35.33% of the population respectively.

Languages of Debagarh district (2011)
1. Odia (89.9%)
2. Munda (3.31%)
3. Kisan (2.60%)
4. Sadri (1.83%)
5. Others (2.38%)

At the time of the 2011 Census of India, 89.94% of the population in the district spoke Odia, 3.31% Mundari, 2.6% Kisan, 1.83% Sadri and 0.91% Ho as their first language.

== Education ==
There are a number of educational institutes in the district, including Raja Basudev High School. In 2017 Govt. of Odisha established one Government Polytechnic at Purunagarh in Deogarh district. Three engineering branches namely civil, electrical and mining are there .

== Transportation ==
Air: – The nearest airports for visiting places of interest in Deogarh District are at Jharsuguda (98 km), Bhubaneswar (265 km) and Raipur (376 km).

Rail: - The nearest rail heads for Deogarh are at Sambalpur (90 km), Bamra on the Tatanagar-Bilaspur section of Howrah-Nagpur-Mumbai line (103 km), Jharsuguda (98 km) and Rourkela (115 km)

Road: - Deogarh is connected with NH6 (Part of AH46) (Mumbai-Kolkata) and NH200 (Raipur-Chandikhole).The city is 90 km from Sambalpur, 115 km from Rourkela and 265 km from Bhubaneswar.

== Politics ==
=== Vidhan sabha constituency ===
Deogarh have only 1 Vidhan sabha constituency.
