= Bilaspur, Chhattisgarh =

Bilaspur
- Metropolis
- Law Capital of Chhattisgarh
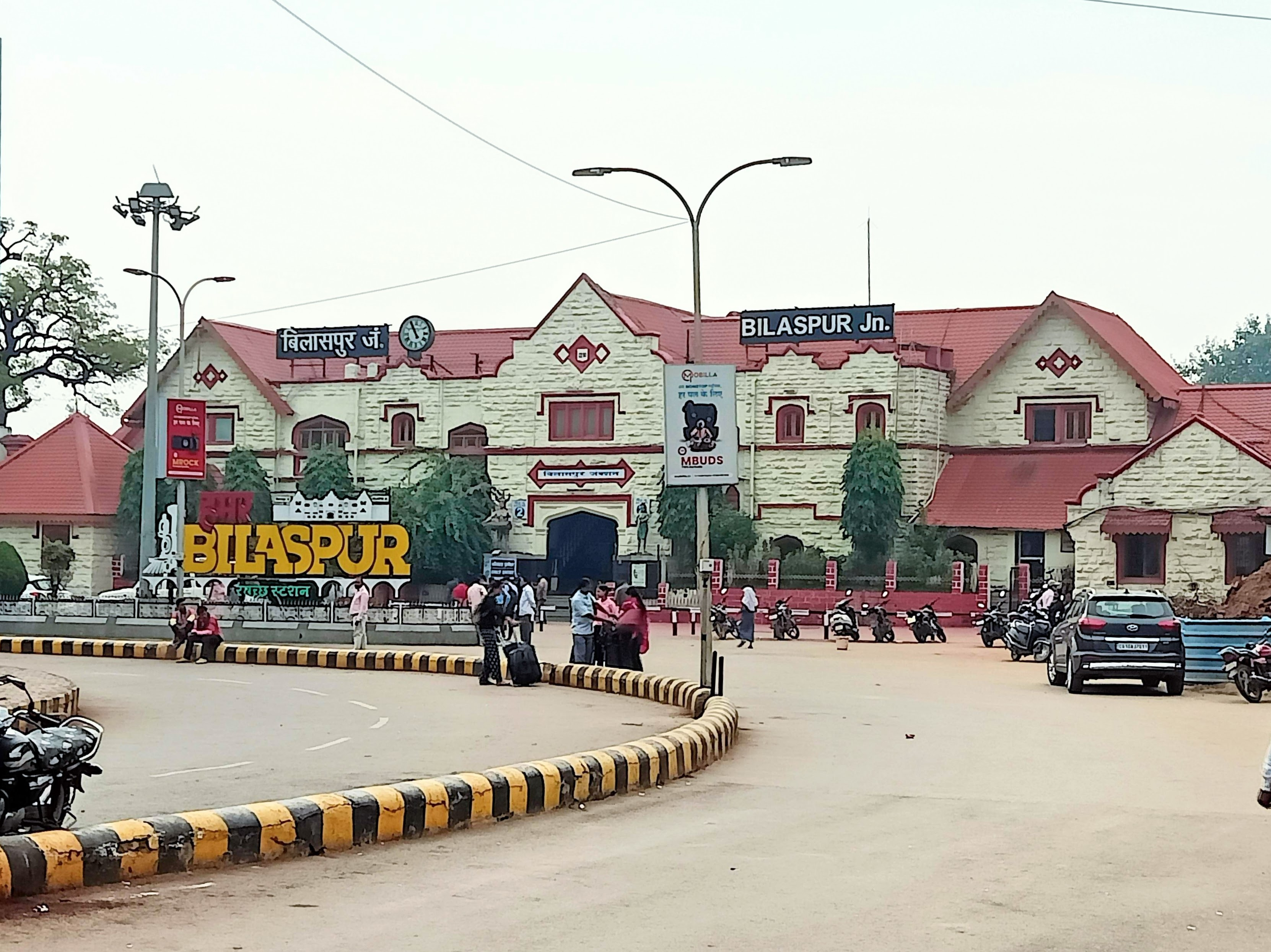
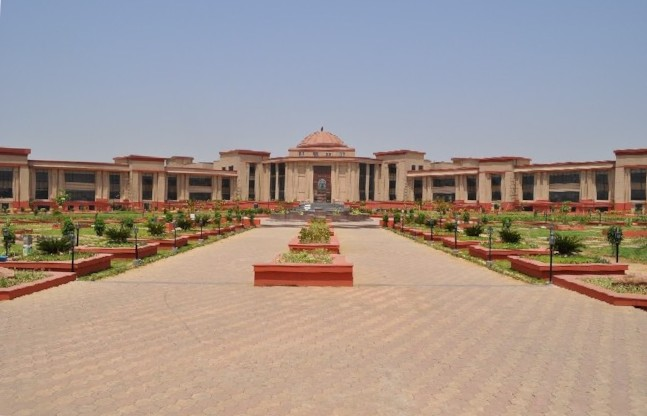
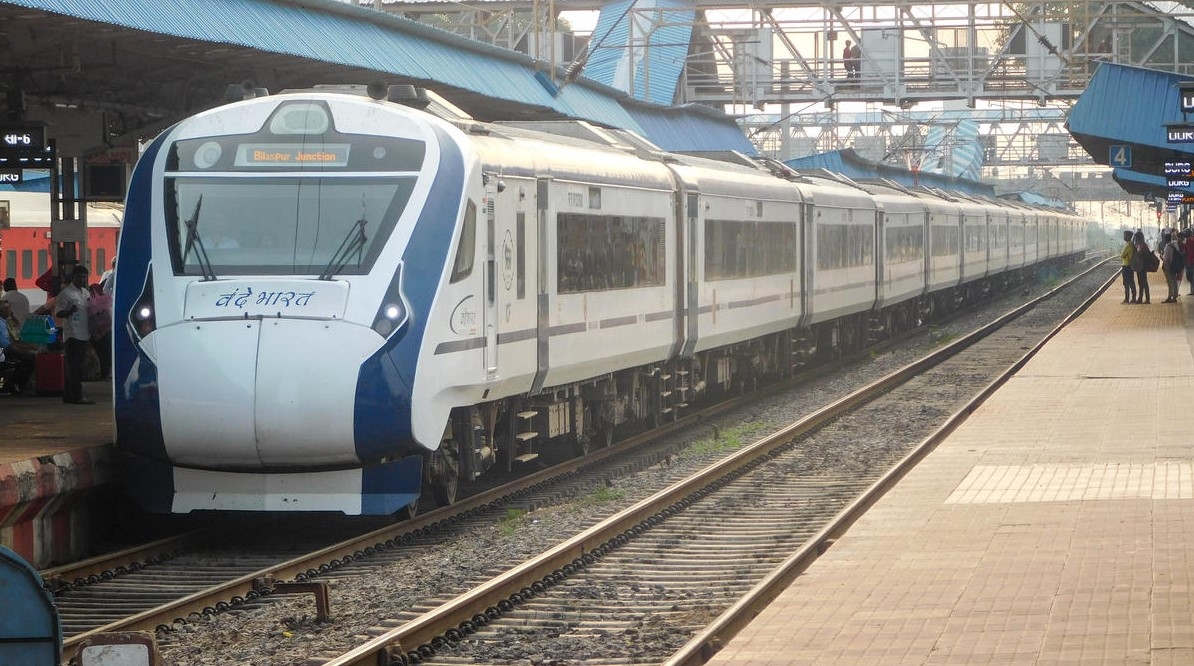
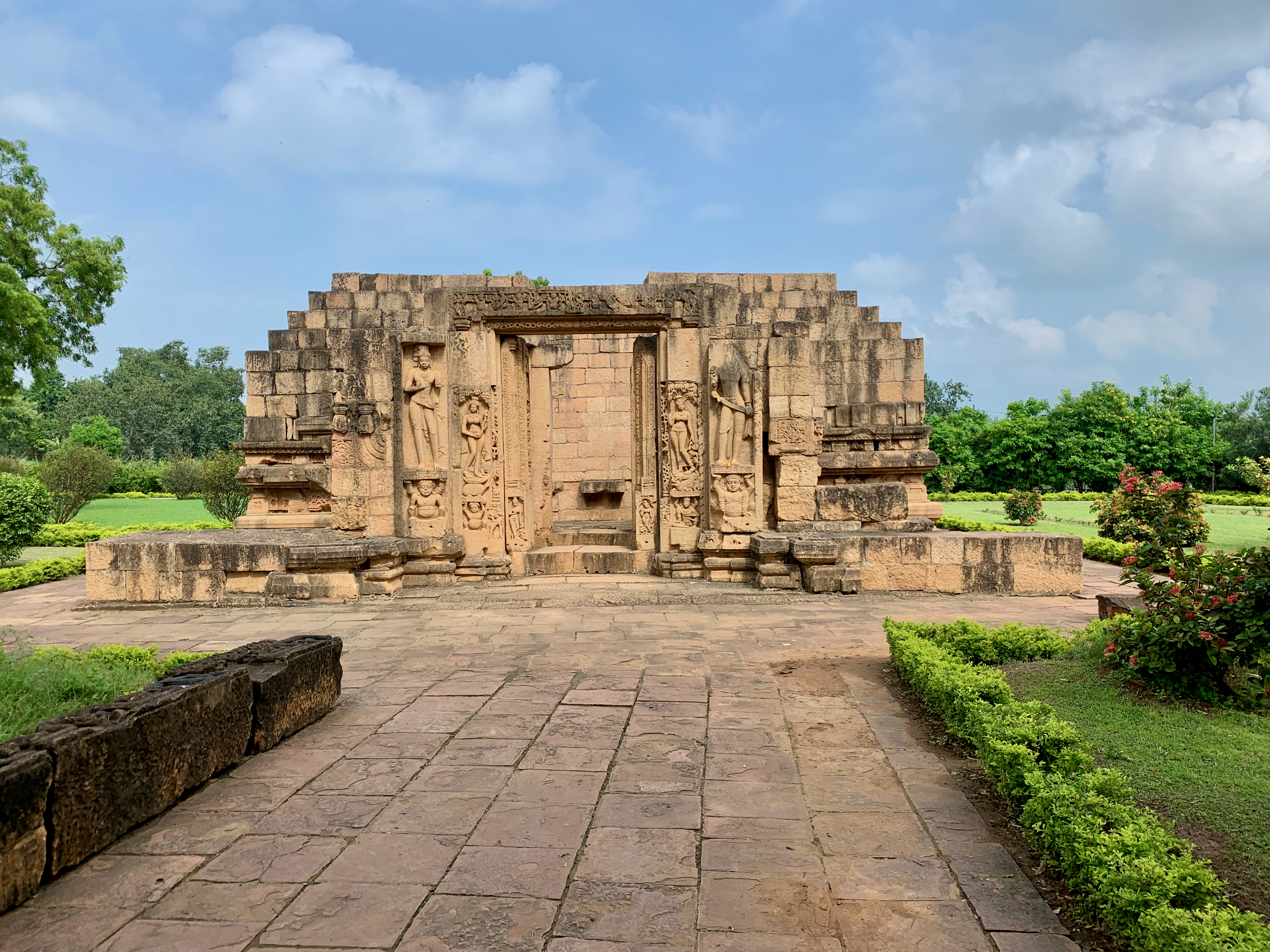
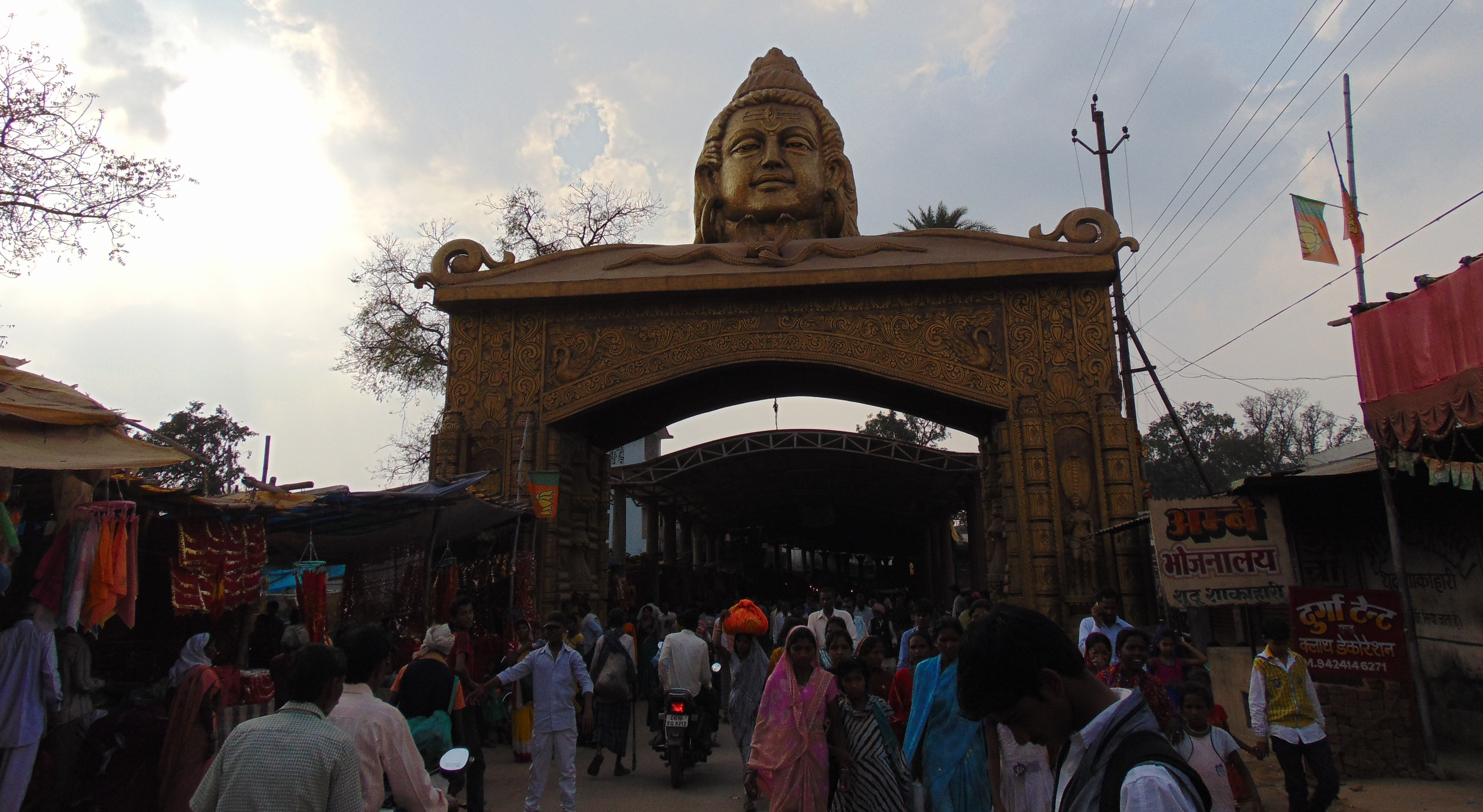
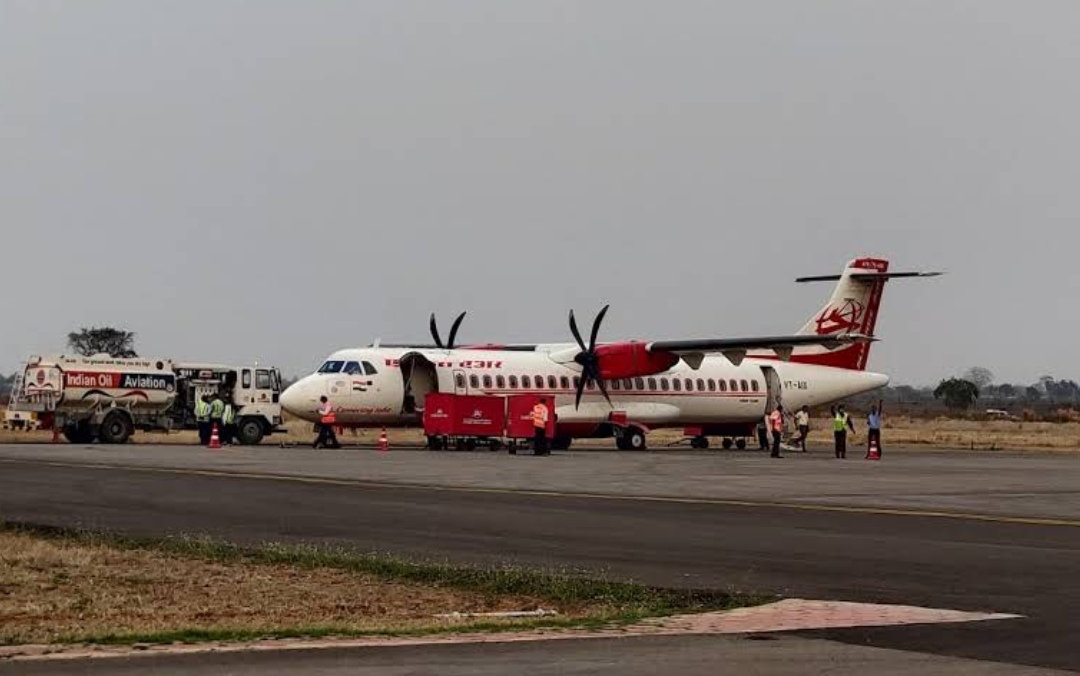
- From top, left to right: Bilaspur Junction railway station, Chhattisgarh High Court, Bilaspur–Nagpur Vande Bharat Express, Bhim Kichak temple, Malhar, Mahamaya Temple, Bilaspur Airport.
- Nickname: Judicial capital
- Location in Chhattisgarh, India Bilaspur (India)
- Coordinates: 22.09°N 82.15°E
- Country: India
- State: Chhattisgarh
- District: Bilaspur
- Named for: Bilasa Bai

Government
  - Body: Bilaspur Municipal Corporation (BMC)
  - Mayor: Pooja Vidhani (BJP)
  - MP: Tokhan Sahu
  - MLA: Amar Agrawal
  - District Collector: Shri Sanjay Agrawal (IAS)

Area
  - Total: 205 km^{2} (79 sq mi)
- Elevation: 207 m (679 ft)

Population (2026)
  - Total: 805,000
  - Rank: 57th

Languages
  - Official: Hindi, Chhattisgarhi
- Time zone: UTC+5:30 (IST)
- PIN: 495001, 495003, 495004, 495006 (Bilaspur)
- Telephone code 31221: 07752
- Vehicle registration: CG-10
- Website: bilaspur.gov.in/en/

Bilaspur is a city located in Bilaspur District in the Indian state of Chhattisgarh. Bilaspur is the administrative headquarters of the Bilaspur District and Bilaspur Division. The Chhattisgarh High Court, located at Bodri, District Bilaspur has privileged it with the title Nyayadhani (Law Capital) of the State. This city is the commercial center and business hub of the northeast Chhattisgarh region.

Bilaspur is also an important city for the Indian Railways, as it is the headquarters for South East Central Railway Zone (SECR) and the Bilaspur Railway Division. Bilaspur is also the headquarters of South Eastern Coalfields Limited. Chhattisgarh's biggest power plant operated by NTPC is in Sipat. PowerGrid in Sipat pools electricity from other power plants in region and transmits electricity to Delhi via one of longest HVDC line.

Bilaspur is known for its aromatic rice variety named 'doobraj' rice, Handloom woven colourful soft kosa silk sarees. Basic Tasar Silkworm Seed Organisation (BTSSO) (website) under the Central Silk Board, Government of India collects, executes the production and supply of nucleus and basic tasar seed from surrounding areas.

Indian Standard Time (IST), the time zone observed throughout India with a time offset of UTC+05:30, passes approx 30 km east of the city.

Bilaspur is one of the 100 Indian cities to be developed as a Smart city under the Smart Cities Mission.

== History ==
Historically, Bilaspur was part of Dakshina Kosala and was near capital of Malhar, Chhattisgarh (ancient Mallar), Sirpur (ancient Shripura), Tuman (ancient Tummana), and Ratanpur (ancient Ratnapura). From the 5th century onwards it was controlled by the Kalachuri dynasty of Ratanpur. Ratanpur was historical capital of Chhattisgarh state for many different dynasty. Bilaspur city, however, came into prominence around 1741, the year of the Maratha Empire rule, when a Maratha official took up his abode there to control dynasty of Ratanpur.

The management of Bilaspur district was taken over by the British East India Company in 1818 after Bhosale lost territory in Third Anglo-Maratha War. Under Bhosale of the Nagpur kingdom there were many subedars or zamindars/landlords like Akbar Khan, Vazeer Khan, Sao and others in Bilaspur.

Bilaspur district was constituted in 1861, followed by Bilaspur municipality in 1867. Famines in the Bilaspur district were recorded by the British administration in 1828–9, 1834–5, 1845–6, 1868–9 and 1899–1900. In 1868-9 and 1899–1900, the rains failed almost completely, resulting in severe distress, migration and desertion of villages. After the 1868-9 famine there was prosperity for the next 25 years; but in 1895 there was a very poor harvest, followed in 1896 by a complete failure of crops, and severe famine continued throughout 1897. In that year the mortality rate was as high as one in six people. The famine of 1897 was followed by two favorable years; but in 1899 the monsoon failed completely and the rice crop was wholly destroyed.

Guru Ghasidas (1756–1836) started a religious movement, Satnamis (meaning the worshippers of Satnam(not related to Sikhism), between 1820 and 1830 primarily around the Sonakhan forests. This religious movement preached against idol-worship, and instead stressed that God is synonymous with truth. His community was a farming community. The university at Bilaspur is named after him as Guru Ghasidas University.

Railways arrived at Bilaspur in the decade 1880–90, with the arrival of the Bengal Nagpur Railway. In 1888 Mistri Jagmal Gangji and other Mistri Railway Contractors laid the first railway tracks from Rajnandgaon to Bilaspur, and in that same year fellow Kutchi contractor Khoda Ramji and others built the line from Bilaspur to Jharsuguda, including the bridge over the Champa river.

In 1890, the present railway station and yard were constructed by the Gujarati railway contractor Jagmal Gangji. His son Mulji Jagmal Sawaria was later given the title of "Rao Sahib" by the British for his contribution to the development of the town, railways and the district. Jagmal Block and Jagmal Chowk in the city are named after Jagmal Gangji Sawaria.

In 1901, the population of Bilaspur was 18,937 and it was the eighth-largest town in the Central Provinces of British India. In 1908, weaving of tasar silk and cotton clothes were recorded as the major industries of Bilaspur.

== Etymology ==
Historical records like The Imperial Gazetteer of India note that the city is said to be named after a fisherwoman by the name of "Bilasa" in the 17th century, and for a long period it consisted only of a few fishermen's huts. James Forsyth stated that Bilaspur is named after the "Palash" trees (Butea frondosa) which are found in abundance in the area. In Sanskrit Bilas means playful or enjoyment and Pur means city or town. So, literally Bilaspur mean the city of enjoyment.

== Geography ==
Bilaspur is located at 22.09°N 82.15°E. It has an average elevation of 264 metres (866 ft).

Bilaspur is situated on the banks of the rain-fed Arpa River, which originates from the Maikal Range of Central India. It's a dolomite rich region surrounded by dense forests in the north and the coal mines of the Hasdeo Valley in the east.

Bilaspur District is surrounded by Gaurella-Pendra-Marwahi District in the north, Anuppur District of Madhya Pradesh, Mungeli and, Baloda Bazar-Bhata Para District in the south and Korba and Janjgir-Champa District in the east.

Major cities around Bilaspur are:

- Raipur and Durg-Bhilai in South-West
- Nagpur in West
- Bhopal and Jabalpur in North-West
- Varanasi and Prayagraj in North
- Ranchi and Patna in North-East
- Korba, Raigarh, Rourkela and Bhubaneswar in East

=== Climate ===
The climate in Bilaspur, Chhattisgarh has been colder than the Raipur region for the winters in December (minimum temperature 6 °C, 42 °F in the last week of December annually, while some areas have even reported temperature going down as low as 3-4 °C, 37 °F), which resembles northern Chhattisgarh. However most of the winter goes mild and pleasant. The city experiences moderate rains in the monsoon. The summers are relatively hot and dry, with maximum temperature 48+ °C, 113 °F.

Climate data for Bilaspur (1991–2020)
Month	Jan	Feb	Mar	Apr	May	Jun	Jul	Aug	Sep	Oct	Nov	Dec	Year
Record high °C (°F)	35.6 (96.1)	38.2 (100.8)	43.2 (109.8)	45.8 (114.4)	49.3 (120.7)	47.2 (117.0)	41.0 (105.8)	36.2 (97.2)	36.6 (97.9)	37.0 (98.6)	35.1 (95.2)	33.6 (92.5)	49.3 (120.7)
Mean daily maximum °C (°F)	27.6 (81.7)	30.8 (87.4)	36.4 (97.5)	40.2 (104.4)	42.4 (108.3)	36.5 (97.7)	32.6 (90.7)	31.4 (88.5)	32.1 (89.8)	32.2 (90.0)	30.8 (87.4)	28.8 (83.8)	33.2 (91.8)
Mean daily minimum °C (°F)	11.6 (52.9)	14.3 (57.7)	18.8 (65.8)	23.5 (74.3)	26.4 (79.5)	25.7 (78.3)	24.8 (76.6)	24.8 (76.6)	23.8 (74.8)	20.4 (68.7)	16.0 (60.8)	12.4 (54.3)	20.3 (68.5)
Record low °C (°F)	5.9 (42.6)	8.3 (46.9)	12.5 (54.5)	16.4 (61.5)	21.0 (69.8)	21.6 (70.9)	20.9 (69.6)	22.4 (72.3)	19.4 (66.9)	12.0 (53.6)	9.2 (48.6)	6.5 (43.7)	5.9 (42.6)
Average rainfall mm (inches)	20.6 (0.81)	17.6 (0.69)	18.1 (0.71)	22.8 (0.90)	16.5 (0.65)	144.8 (5.70)	317.3 (12.49)	365.8 (14.40)	215.5 (8.48)	55.9 (2.20)	8.3 (0.33)	4.7 (0.19)	1,208.1 (47.56)
Average rainy days	1.5	1.6	1.8	1.9	1.7	8.8	15.9	15.7	9.8	3.2	0.8	0.5	63.0
Source: India Meteorological Department

== Demographics ==
As of 2011 India census, Bilaspur Municipal Corp had a population of 331,030. Bilaspur urban area population was estimated at 365,579. In August 2019, adjacent 18 towns and sub-urban areas were included in the Bilaspur Municipal Corporation. Males constitute 51% of the population and females 49%. Bilaspur has an average literacy rate of 91.29%, higher than the national average of 59.5%; with male literacy of 92.94% and female literacy of 88.33%. 15% of the population is under 6 years of age.

According to the 2011 census, Bilaspur District, Chhattisgarh has a population of 2,662,077, roughly equal to the nation of Kuwait or the US state of Nevada. Bilaspur District ranks 152nd in India (out of a total of 640). The district has a population density of 322 inhabitants per square kilometre (830/sq mi) . Its population growth rate over the decade 2001–2011 was 33.21%. Bilaspur has a sex ratio of 972 females for every 1000 males, and a literacy rate of 71.59%.

The main languages spoken are Chhattisgarhi and Hindi.

== Administration ==
Bilaspur Division

Bilaspur district is the headquarter of the Bilaspur Division of Chhattisgarh. This division consists of eight districts (as of May 2024) -

1. Bilaspur
2. Korba
3. Raigarh
4. Janjgir-Champa
5. Mungeli
6. Gaurella-Pendra-Marwahi
7. Sakti
8. Sarangarh-Bhilaigarh

Tehsil

The Bilaspur district consists of 11 Tehsils - Bilaspur, Kota, Takhatpur, Bilha, Masturi, Ratanpur, Sipat, Belgahna, Beltara, Bodri and Sakri.

Block Samiti

Bilaspur district is divided into 4 block samitis which covers 483 Gram Panchayats and 708 villages (as of May 2024). These are -

1. Kota (101 Panchayat covering 162 villages).
2. Takhatpur (117 Panchayat covering 178 villages).
3. Belha (139 Panchayat covering 174 villages).
4. Masturi (126 Panchayat covering 173 villages).

Bilaspur City Administration

The Bilaspur city is a Nagar Nigam and district headquarter of Bilaspur district. Bilaspur City runs under the administration of the Bilaspur Municipal Corporation (BMC). Its Nagar Nigam, Municipality, District Magistrate, Sub-Divisional Magistrate, Tehsildar office and collectorate office are all situated near Nehru Chowk. It has three Nagar Palikas namely (1) Takhatpur, (2) Ratanpur, (3) Tifra. It has been categorised into seven Nagar Panchayat namely (1) Bilha (2) Kota (3) Bodri and (4) Malhar (5) Gourella (6) Sakri (7) Sirgitti.

== Culture ==
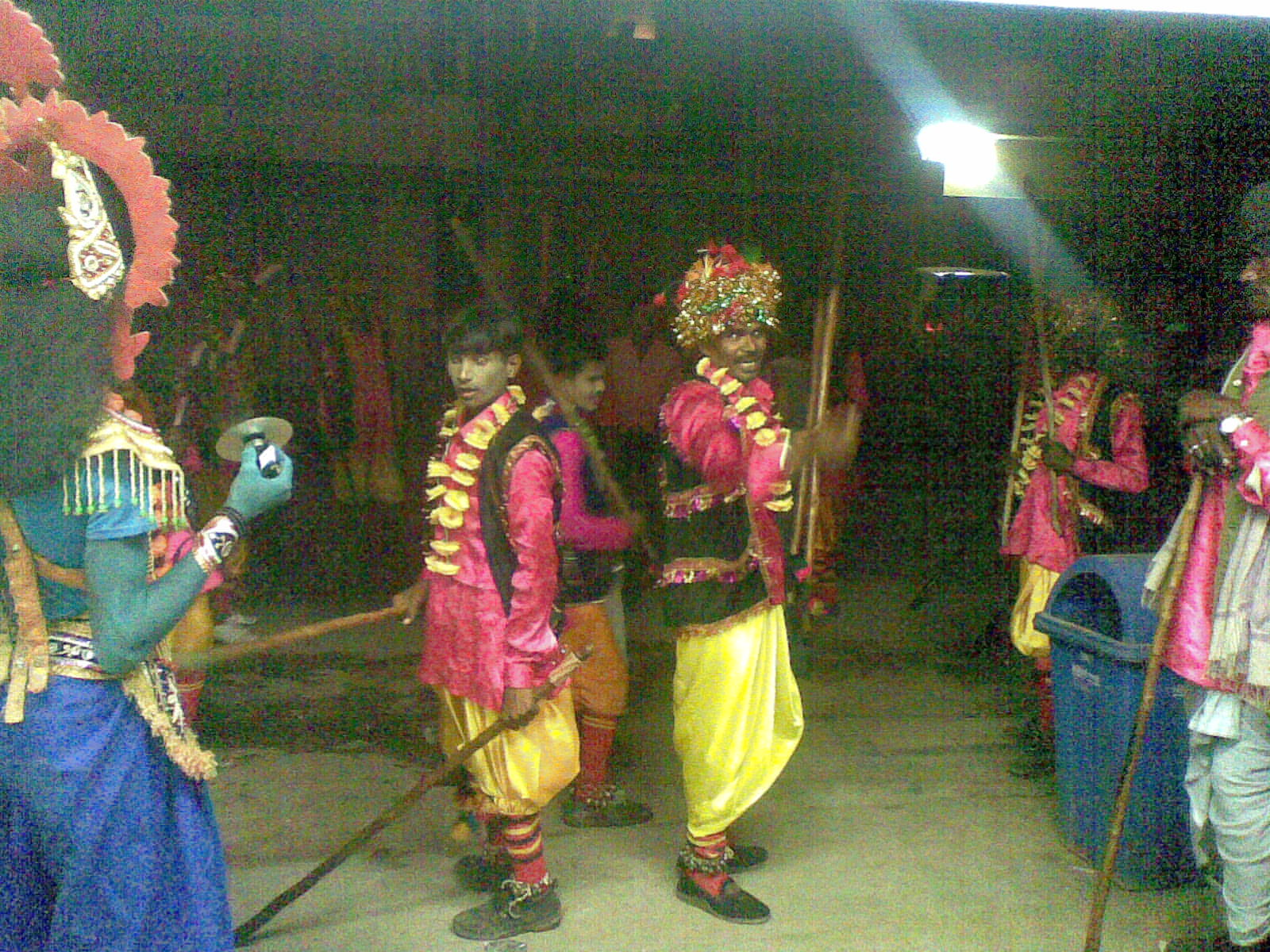
Raut Dance of Bilaspur Chhattisgarh

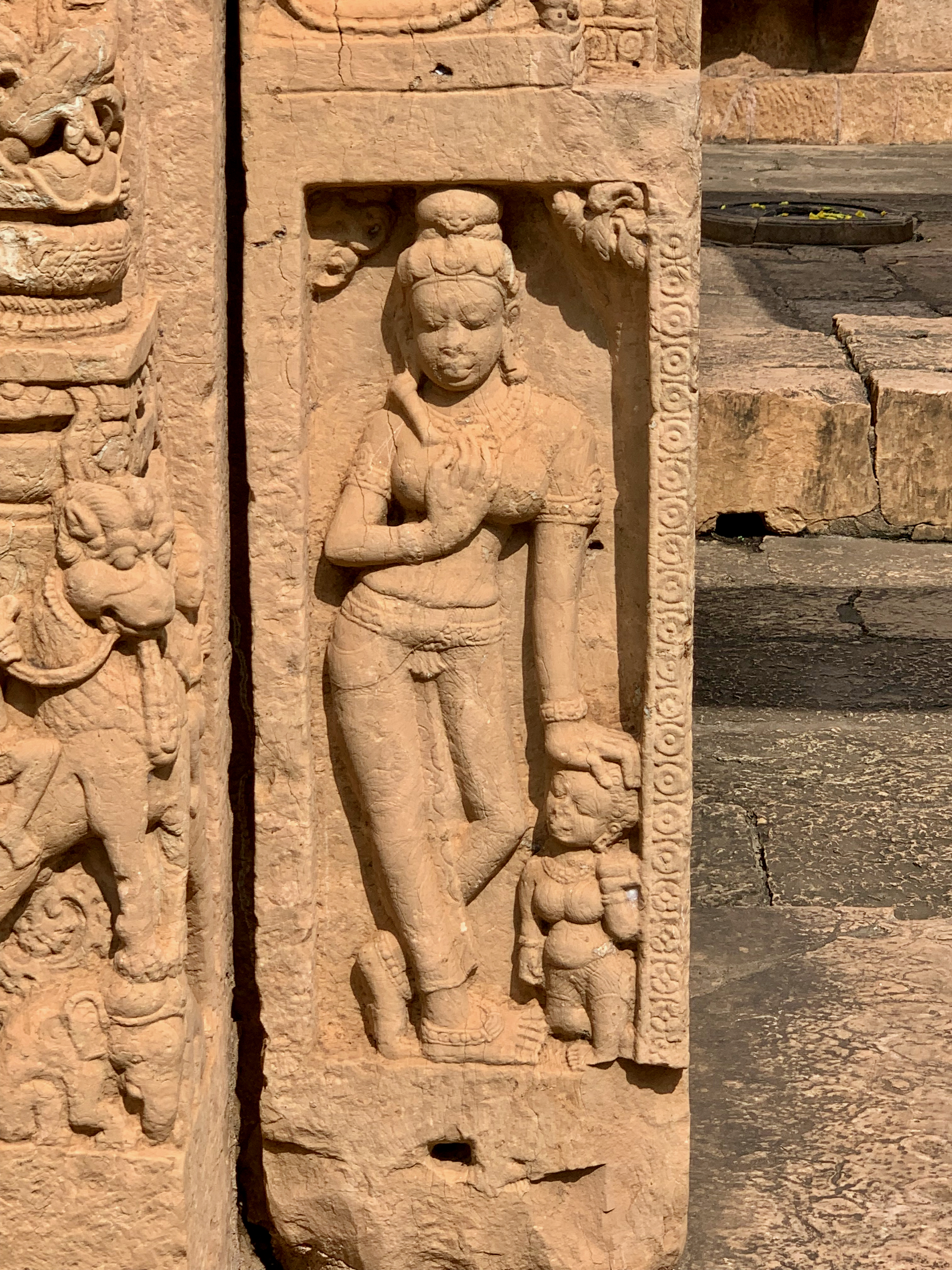
6th 7th century Bhima Kichak Temple, Malhar Chhattisgarh India - 10

Bilaspur is rich in its cultural heritage. Bilaspur has its own dance styles, cuisine, music and traditional folk songs. In rural areas, women wear garlands made of one rupee coins. This has gone out of fashion in recent times. The city celebrates all the major festivals of India. There are some local festivals such as the colorful Raut Nach (November), harley, and pola. The Raut Nach Mahotsav is the folk-dance festival of Bilaspur celebrated by Yaduvanshis also known as Rauts in Chhattisgarh to honor lord Krishna and to thank nature for good crop season.

There are other folk dances like Panthi, Karma, Kaksar and Padnwani (Needs to be added content).

The town has been the home of several literary, theatre, arts personalities including Makhan Lal Chaturvedi, Satyadev Dubey, Bimal Mitra, Shrikant Verma.

== Utility services ==
Over the years, Bilaspur has developed many 4 – lane and 6 – lane roads, street lighting and squares. However, the last decade has seen large-scale unregulated urbanization and residential and commercial expansion, over-straining the water resources and generally defunct civic amenities due to indifferent officials and politicians. There is a master plan for the city and surrounding areas.

Electricity is government-regulated and, as of now, no power cuts are effected, thanks to the massive expansion in energy generating capacity both by public and private companies in the energy sector.

== Hospitals and health care facilities ==
Bilaspur is home to many hospitals and nursing homes, some run by the state government and others by the private sector. City has a government medical college named Chhattisgarh Institute of Medical Science which has 750 beds for patients. There is Apollo Hospitals in the private sector, which is 300 bedded specialty hospital. A new mental hospital is established in village Sendri (Ratanpur Road) which provides quality treatment. More than 25 Sanjivni express and Mahatari express are running in city. It also has private dental colleges in the city area.

== Economy ==
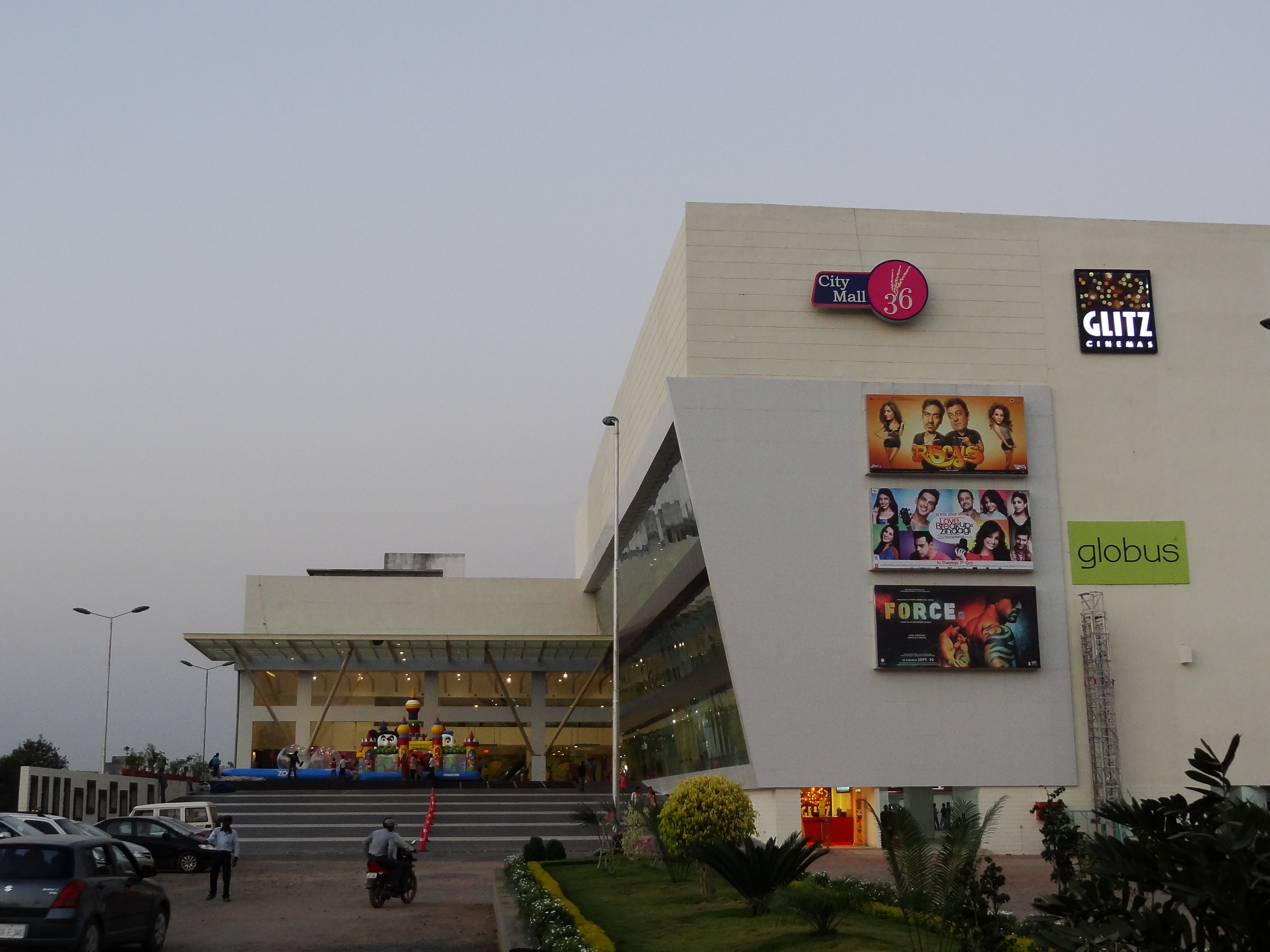
City-36 Shopping Mall, Bilaspur

Bilaspur is the center of electric power generation in India. Bilaspur and the surrounding area generate 10,000 MW of electricity, and an additional 50,000 MW are planned in the next few years. As many as 22 companies are interested to tap an estimated power generation potential of 50,000 megawatts in the region. The railways have gotten a major boost with big energy sector players set to invest Rs.5,000 crore in three proposed railways corridors around Bilaspur. Chhattisgarh is also known as "The Rice Bowl" – Dhan ka katora. Bilaspur is the centre of agri products. There are approx. 500 rice and dall mills in the surrounding area. In FY2022/21, the South East Central Railway zone, whose geography encompasses Bilaspur, earned Rs 14,2855.71 crore, "the highest among all of the railway divisions of Indian Railways". The Bilaspur railways zone comprises the divisions of Bilaspur, Nagpur and Raipur. South Eastern Coalfields Limited (SECL), a subsidiary of Public Sector Unit Coal India Limited (CIL) – A Maharatna Company, is situated with headquarters at Bilaspur. SECL is a Miniratna PSU under the Ministry of Coal, with several awards in its credentials including best PSU award in 1997–98. An integrated action plan for development of civic infrastructure, including hi-tech water purifier system, proper drainage facilities and cleanliness, is being planned by the state government for cities and towns, while the proposed 'Arpa Project' would give a new life to the city of Bilaspur, minister for urban administration and health Amar Agrawal said in an interview to the Times of India, a leading newspaper of India. The State Government has drawn up an ambitious plan of Rs2,000 crore to develop the Arpa river bank in Bilaspur district during the next seven years. For this, the Government has constituted a 'Special Area Development Authority' (SADA) for the development of the Arpa river bank near Bilaspur city.

The Government has invited proposals from interested national and international institutions for the development of the river bank on a PPP model. The Authority has prepared a project for the development of the river and is now in search of organisations that would be interested in developing the river on a Public Private Partnership (PPP).

According to SADA, about 653 hectares of area on the banks of the river would be developed. This area is 13.4 km in length. Commercial, residential, entertainment and other institutional facilities would be developed in this area. On both the sides of the river, 13.4-km-long retaining wall, houses and commercial complexes would be constructed, besides bridge, roads and walkways. Water supply, sewerage, drainage, electricity supply would be provided in the area.

The estimated cost of all the works is Rs2,000 crore. The development works would be taken up in phases during the next seven years.

Of the total 653-hectare area, some of the land is owned privately. In lieu of acquisition of private land, the affected people would be given land at other areas. After development about 267 hectares of land will be made available for sale. By selling this land, the developer could recover the invested amount. The downtown is called Gol Bazaar (Circular Market). Gol Bazaar, Sadar Bazaar and company Garden Chowk are buzzing and vibrant but overcrowded with slow-moving traffic. In contrast there are some newly developed areas as well. The Vyapar Vihar is a newly developed commercial and goods transport area. Bilaspur has Chhattisgarh's first hi-tech bus stand at Bodri.

It has the High Court of Chhattisgarh which is Asia's largest court (in area).

- Industries: Around Bilaspur, there are many industrial areas, including Tifra, Sirgitti and Silpahri Industrial Growth Centres. Sirgitti, Silpahri and Tifra around Bilapur are major industrial areas near Bilaspur. Located on the outskirts of Bilaspur city Sirgitti Industrial Centre is spread over an area of approx. 338 hectares. With about 324 industries it provides direct employment to 4431 persons. Silpahari Industrial Centre is another industrial area near Bilaspur and is home to many sponge iron industries. Tifra Industrial Area situated on the outskirts of Bilaspur city is spread over an area of approx. 65 hectares. Many chemical, PVC footwear, HDPE woven sacks, polythene bags and sheets, soft drinks and other units are located here. CSIDC or Chhattisgarh State Industrial Development Corporation Limited is responsible for the development of maintenance of all these industrial areas in and around Bilaspur. Chhattisgarh Laghu Evam Sahayak Udyog Sangh or CLSUS is an association of industries which represents all major industries of Bilaspur and Chhattisgarh. BEC Fertilizers – a unit of Bhilai Engineering Corporation is situated in the Sirgitti Industrial Area.
- Power plants – Bilaspur has India's second largest power plant of NTPC at Sipat which generates power of 2980 MW with 3 units of 660 MW each and 1 unit of 1000 MW. Many thermal power plants are coming up in the surrounding area of Bilaspur. Also notable are Nova, KSK, Gitanjali, Mahanadi etc.
- Legal: The day the state of Chhattisgarh was constituted (1 November 2000) with its capital at Raipur, the High Court of Chhattisgarh was established at Bilaspur. It is the 19th high court of India.
- Banks: All major Indian banks have branches and ATMs in the city. SBI have approx. 80 ATMs in the city as of 2013.
- Website: A website dedicated to provide information on Bilaspur is maintained by NIC.
- A new Indoor stadium is under construction at Behtarai Road.

== Transport ==
=== Roadways ===
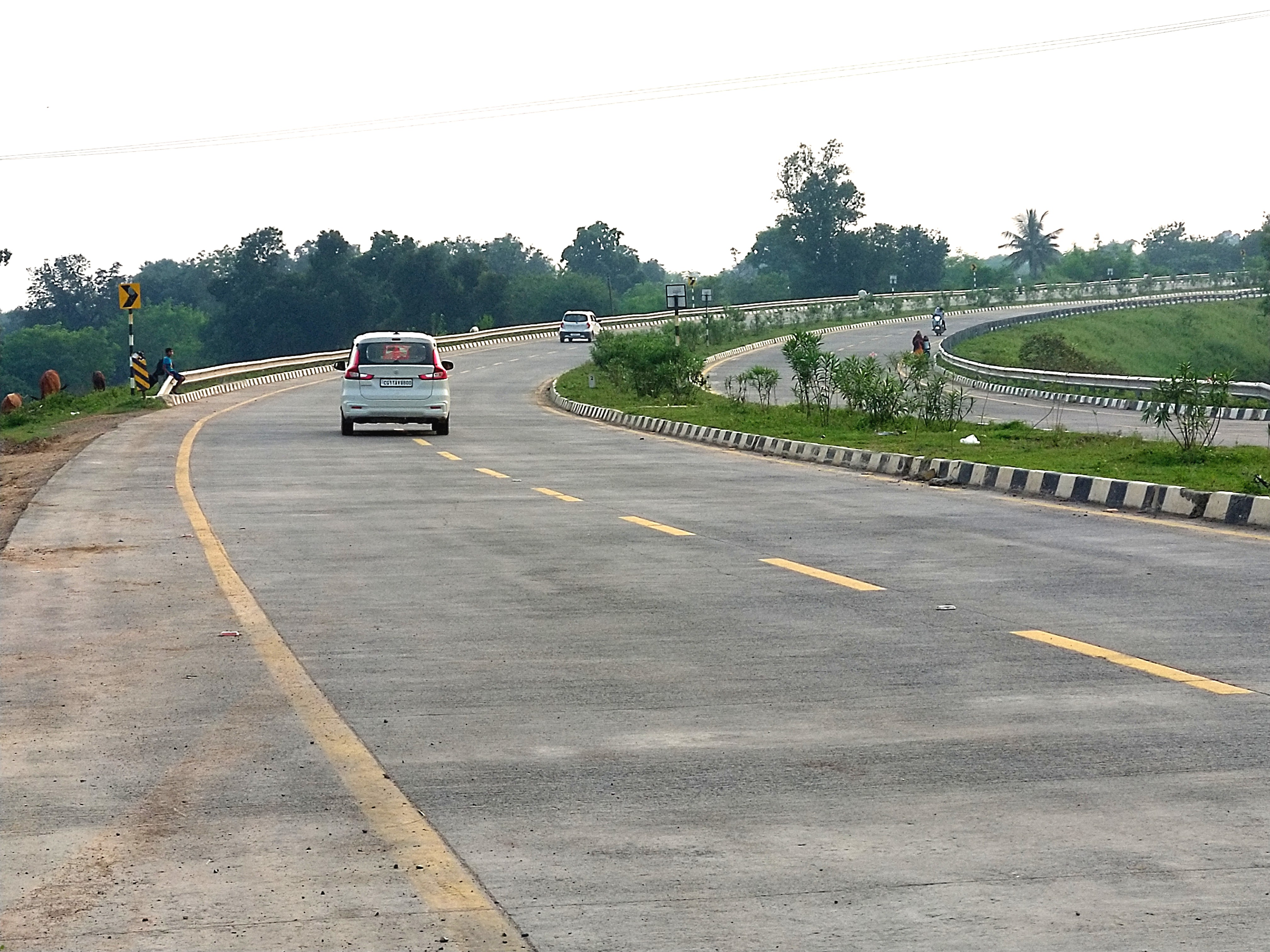
NH-49 passing through as Bilaspur bypass

Bilaspur is well-connected with a network of national highways intersecting it. The national highways are National Highway 130 (NH-130) connecting Bilaspur with Ambikapur and Raipur directly, National Highway 130A (NH-130A), National Highway 45 (NH-45) and National Highway 49 (NH-49). The proposed Narmada Expressway will start from Bilaspur, and will run till Ahmedabad, along the route of the Narmada River. Once completed, it will help to enhance connectivity and commute from Bilaspur to neighbouring states, and will also provide direct connectivity to the national and the financial capitals of India, as well as with Madhya Pradesh, via the Delhi–Mumbai Expressway and other expressways. EC-7: Raipur- Bilaspur - Ranchi - Dhanbad Economic Corridors of India or Industrial Corridors of India is identified under Bharatmala road network and passes through Bilaspur - Baloda - Urga. The construction of Bilaspur - Urga expressway is expected to complete by 2024.

The following table provides the routes of the national highways passing through Bilaspur:

NH	Route
NH-45	Bhopal » Jabalpur » Amarkantak » Bilaspur
NH-49	Bilaspur » Raigarh » Jharsuguda » Kharagpur
NH-130	Raipur » Simga » Bilaspur » Katghora » Ambikapur
NH-130A	Pondi » Mungeli » Bilaspur » Sipat » Dharamjayagarh » Pathalgaon

=== Rail ===
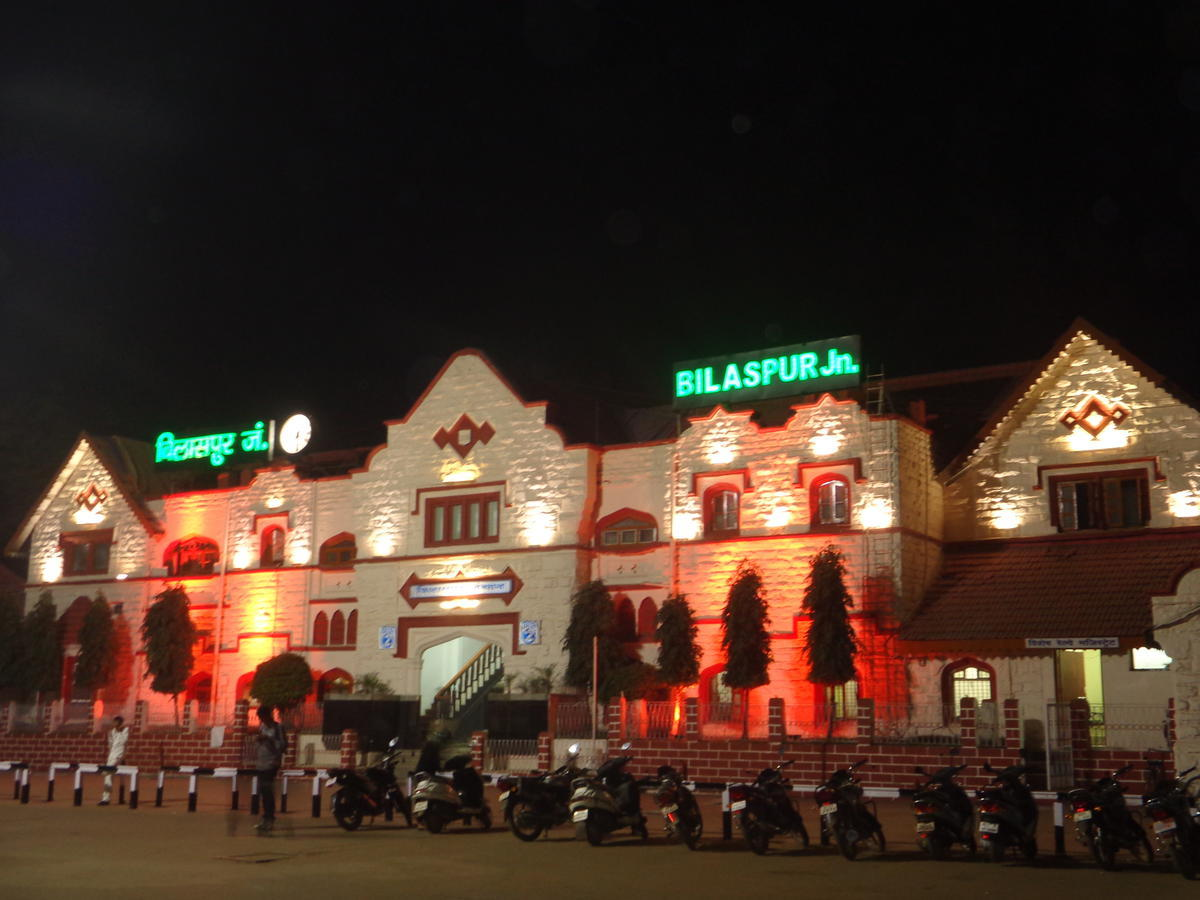
Bilaspur Junction Railway Station

The nearest railway station is Bilaspur Junction railway station, which is the Zonal and divisional headquarter of the South East Central Railway zone of the Indian Railways.

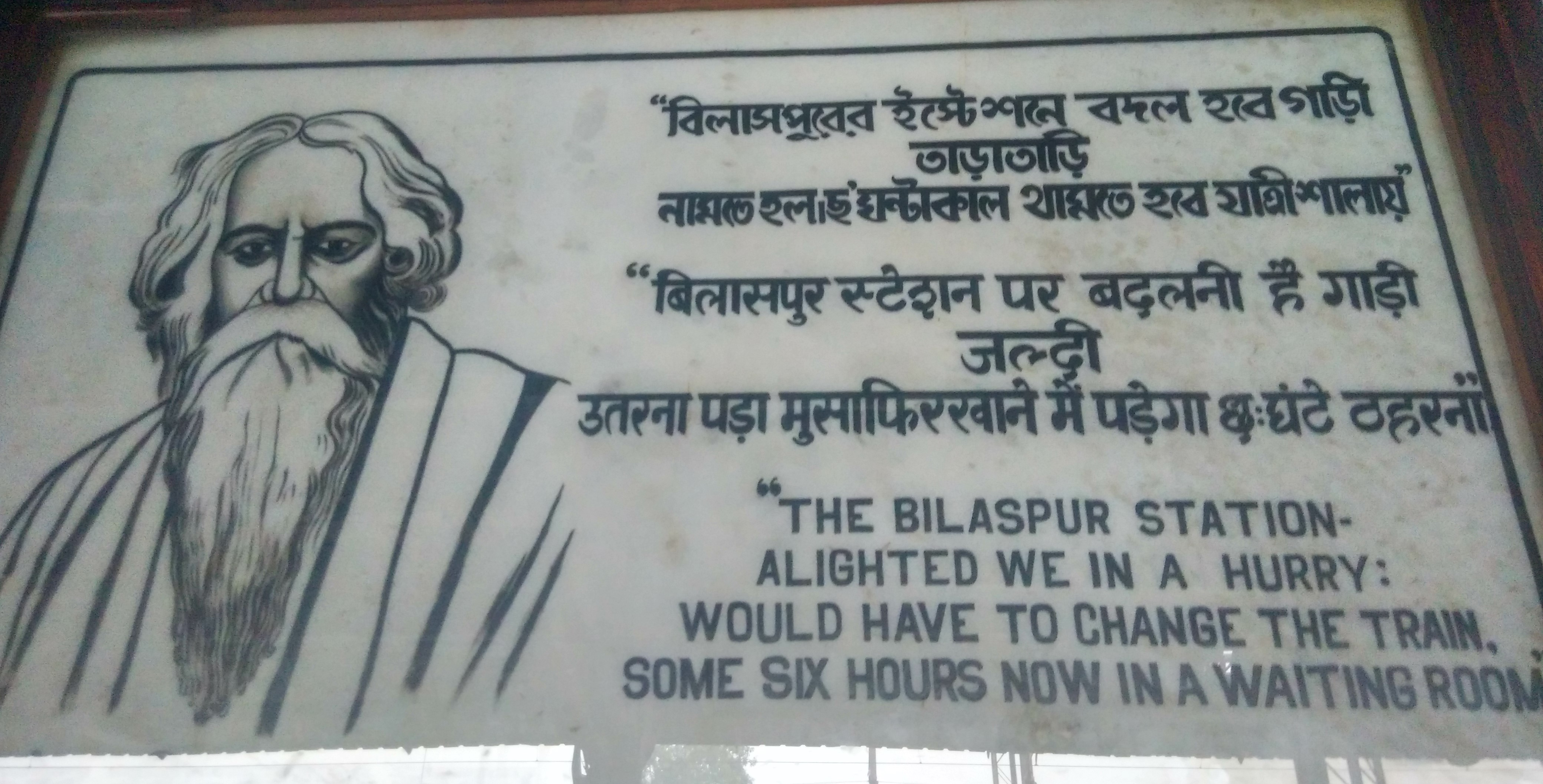
Bilaspur Railway Station (Chhattisgarh, India) and Shri Rabindranath Tagore

Bilaspur is junction of 4x4x3 railway lines with quadruple railway lines going to Mumbai-Howrah and triple lines going towards Katni-New Delhi. It is the busiest junction of Chhattisgarh, and the second busiest of central India after Itarsi station for passenger trains. It is the third cleanest railway station in India after Surat and Rajkot stations. It is well connected with the rest of the country, as it lies on the Tatanagar–Bilaspur section of the Howrah–Nagpur–Mumbai line and a junction, as another line goes towards Delhi via Katni. The station has the fifth longest railway platform in India after Hubballi, Gorakhpur, Kollam and Kharagpur stations. The Bilaspur Rajdhani Express is the train that connects Bilaspur with the national capital every two days in a week. Vande Bharat Express from Bilaspur to Nagpur provide high speed connectivity.

Because of the station's location, daily connections are available for Kolkata, Mumbai, New Delhi, Pune, Nagpur, Ahmedabad, Indore, Bhopal, Amritsar, Agra, Roorkee, Haridwar, Visakhapatnam, Bhubaneswar, Cuttack, Khordha, Rourkela, Puri, Jamshedpur, Patna, Jabalpur, Raipur, Varanasi, Jaipur, Bikaner, Udaipur, Ajmer, Thiruvananthapuram, Kollam, Chennai, Ernakulam, Tirupati, Tirunelveli, Bangalore, Bhuj, Gandhidham, Okha, Porbandar, Dhanbad, Hyderabad, Jaipur, Gorakhpur, Shirdi, Udaipur, Bikaner, Jammu, Jodhpur, Kanpur, Lucknow, Ranchi, Guwahati among many other cities throughput India. For services within the state, daily local trains run to all cities of the state.

Other railway stations present near Bilaspur city are:

- Uslapur
- Chakarbhata
- Dadhapara
- Gatora

Uslapur is the other Major city station which is 8 km from the main junction station. It is used as secondary station for express trains towards Katni. There is loco training centre for loco drivers in which trainees from various part of the central comes.

Fourth railway line between Bilaspur and Jharsuguda is under construction and which is presently a triple line section. Fourth line between Bilaspur and Durg Jn is approved in railway budget of FY23-24. Third railway line between Bilaspur and Katni is under construction. The survey of fourth railway line between Bilaspur and Nagpur is underway. Most upgrades are to handle coal evacuation from coal mining areas in East India to power plants in west of Bilaspur. A 10 km long grade separator is currently added between 3rd line of Bilaspur and Uslapur.

=== Bus transport ===
The Bilaspur Bus Station is the main bus station of the city. It is also known as Hi-tech Bus Stand. It is well connected with other cities within and outside the state. Daily bus services are operated by government and private operators to cities like Jashpur, Ambikapur, Raipur, Jagdalpur, Korba, Nagpur, Durg, Bhilai, Mungeli, Kawardha, Raigarh, Narayanpur, Kondagaon, Jabalpur, Varanasi, Prayagraj, Nagpur, Gondia, Mandla, Anuppur, Shehdol, Jharsuguda, Sambalpur, Bhawanipatna, Hyderabad, among others.

=== Air ===
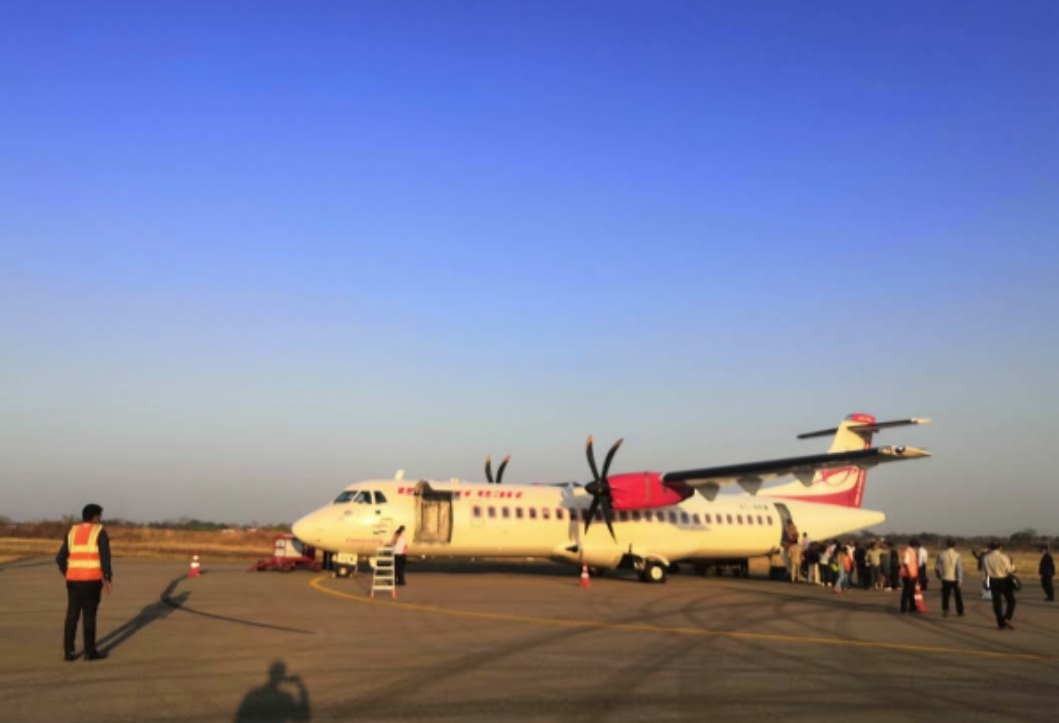
Bilasa Devi Kevat Airport, Bilaspur

The nearest airport is Bilasa Devi Kevat Airport, also known as Bilaspur Airport, located 13 km (8.1 mi) south of the city. Currently, there are direct flights from the airport to Jabalpur, Hyderabad, Delhi, Kolkata, Prayagraj, Jagdalpur, operated by Alliance Air.

== Tourism ==
=== Natural attractions ===
The Achanakmar-Amarkantak Biosphere Reserve is the prime tourist attraction of Bilaspur, and has been recognized by the UNESCO for its dramatic and ecologically diverse landscape. It is reputed to have some of the densest forests in the country and an even spread of hills and rivers. One of the places worth visiting within the biosphere reserve is the Achanakmar Wildlife Sanctuary. Home to a wide variety of wildlife, the sanctuary is spread over an area of 551 km^{2} (213 mi^{2}), and was set up in 1975 under the Wildlife Protection Act. The sanctuary is 55 km (34 mi) away from Bilaspur, and remains closed during the monsoon season.

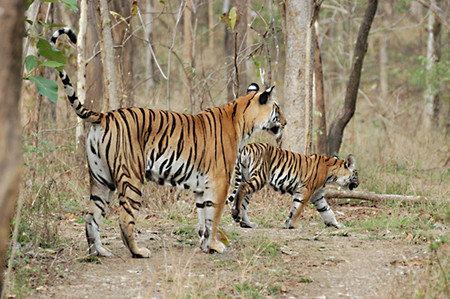
Tigers at the sanctuary

Just before entry into the sanctuary, is the Ghongapani Dam. Beyond the sanctuary, for accommodation, on the way to Amarkantak, there are government guest houses in Achanakmar, Keonchi and Lamni. These guest houses can be booked with governmental officials in the district headquarters, also by booking only from their official websites. The forest guest housed at Lamni were built by the British. It is 1,850 feet above sea level, and was built in June 1913.

In the sanctuary, the presence of animals like the Guar (Indian bison) and tigers are in high numbers, as reported by multiple sightings by visitors. Other animals include leopards, Chitals, panthers, striped hyenas, canis', sloth bears, Dholes, Sambar deers, Nilgais, Indian four-horned antelopes and chinkaras, which populate the sanctuary in equal numbers. Trips to the sanctuary can be organized via private taxi and bus operators.

=== Man-made & Historical attractions ===
Various archeological sites and temples in and around Bilaspur attract tourists from all over the world. There are more than 20 recognized and protected monuments and sites by the Archaeological Survey of India. Other than the Achanakmar Wildlife Sanctuary, the following are the man-made tourist attractions:

- Dams: Khutaghat dam, (55 km), known for its lush and green environment due its location in the Baghelkhand range, Khudia Dam (75 km) and Hasdev Bango Dam is (105 km) from Bilaspur, respectively.
- Ratanpur: Ratanpur was capital of ancient Chhattisgarh until Maratha Empire. At present it served as spiritual capital of the region and known for historical Mahamaya temple and Ram Tekri Mandir.
- Malhar: Malhar is one of the main centre of archeology. Ruins of forts to ancient temples and fort are found here. Malhar is of historical significance, as it was visited by Xuanzang, the Chinese historian. It is situated 31 km (19 mi) southeast of Bilaspur. In Malhar, many ancient temples have been found by excavations, such as Pataleshwar temple, Devri temple and Dindeshwari temple. The four-handed idol of Lord Vishnu is also significant as it is the earliest sculptural representation, dating back to approx. 1000 BCE, to the Ratnapura–Kalachuri Regime. Malhar has a museum too for providing knowledge and information to tourists and interested people, maintained by the Archaeological Survey of India. Ratanpur is located 25 km (16 mi) north of Bilaspur, and is known for its Mahamaya temple and Ram Tekri Mandir.

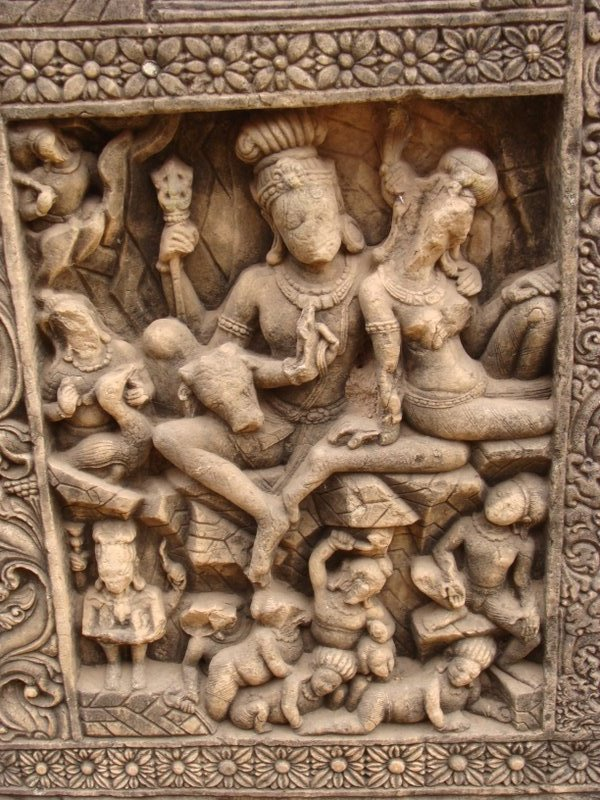
Temple carvings in Malhar

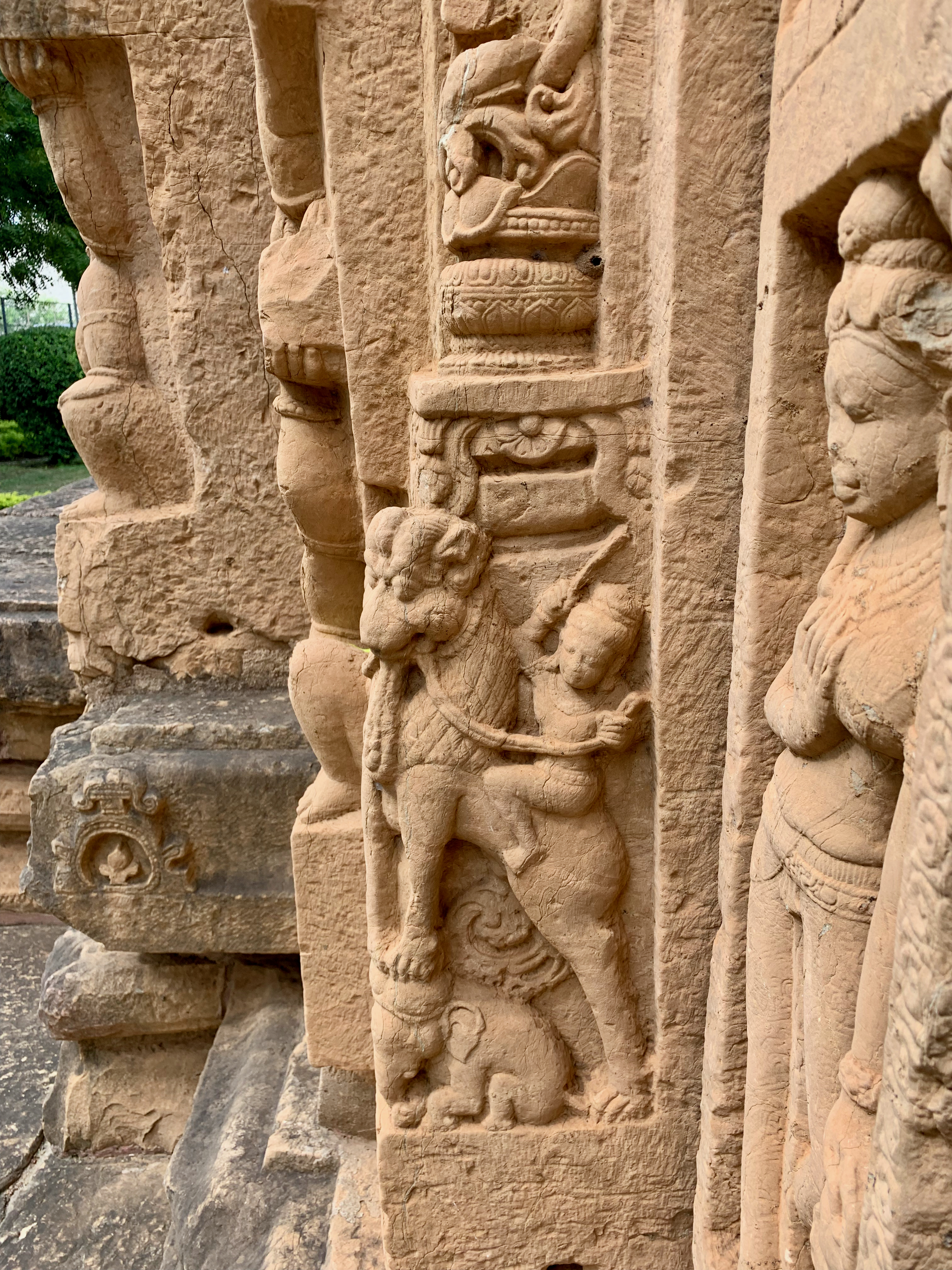
Bhima Kichak Temple, Malhar, 6th–7th Century AD

- Talagram: Located 27 km (17 mi) south of Bilaspur, situated on the banks of the Maniyari River, is the location for the "Deorani-Jethani" temple.
- Tala: Located 27 km (17 mi) south of Bilaspur, is famous for its Rudra Shiva.
- Belpan: Located 40 km (25 mi) west of Bilaspur, there is a huge pond, as well as a samadhi.
- Kabir Chabutra: Located near the Raipur bypass road, or the NH-53, at a distance of 110 km (68 mi) south from Bilaspur, is a hub for mahatmas (saints). As Bilaspur is situated on the banks of the Arpa river, Leelagar and Maniyari are other small rivers of the district, where there are accommodation facilities, out of which most of these facilities are under development to promote tourism along the river areas.
- Sonmuda: Located 106 km (66 mi) north of Bilaspur, it is a well-known attraction, which gives a panoramic view of valleys, hills and forest. This is also the place where the Sone River originates from.
- Amarkantak: Located 117 km (73 mi) northwest of Bilaspur, in Madhya Pradesh, is known for being the origin of the Narmada River.
- Kanan Pendari Zoological Garden: Located within city limits.
- Kirari Godhi: Located 19 km (12 mi) south of Bilaspur, close to Tala, is known for its ancient Shiva temple, dating to 11th-12th Century AD.
- Sargaon: Located 27 km (17 mi) southwest of Bilaspur, also close to Tala, is known for its ‘Dhoom Nath’ or ‘Dumeshwari Devi’ Temple, dedicated to Lord Shiva, dating back to the 12th century AD.
- Bhartiya Nagar: Known for its Shri Aiyyappa Mandir, located near Tifra flyover, within city limits.
- Mungeli: Located 51 km (32 mi) west of Bilaspur, it is known for its Maa Mahamaya Temple.
- Pali: Located 50 km (31 mi) north of Bilaspur, it is known for its ancient Mahadev Temple.
- Smriti Vatika: A lush, green, planned garden, located just before the entrance of the Kanan Pendari Zoological Garden, in the city.
- Rani Sati Temple: A religious temple built in within Bilaspur made by the Marwaris, where the deity of Jhunjhunu's temple is worshipped.
- Many amusement park and water parks are also located near city. Bubble Island, Waterbomb, Alakart, Radhika Water Park, Ishika Amusement park are major attractions for children and families. Smriti Van (not to be confused with Smriti Vatika, as Smriti Van is close to Bilaspur railway station) and Urja Parks are also situated in Rajkishore Nagar area of the city.
- Maa Marimai Temple is also a temple of Bilaspur.

== Food & cuisine ==
Bilaspur is famous for food varieties, such as Doobraj rice, Fara/Muthiya (Rice floor dumpling), doodh-fara (sweet and milky version of fara), Cheela (Dosa like rice pancake), rice roll, sonhari (Poori made from Rice Flour or Sweet Potato), ayirsa roti(Rice-jaggery based dry dish), Gulgula/Gulgul Bhajiya (Sweet fritter made using wheat flour), angakar/mota roti (roti made from rice/wheat flour using leftover cooked rice), thetri-khurmi, Chousela (rice flour poori) , Bhajiya Kadhi (Savoury-salty Yogurt/curd dish), Sabudana bada (Sago fritter), Bafuari/Bhajiya, Idhar Kadhi (Kadhi made using Arbi leaves), airsa, tamatar fatka (tomato chutney), different types of bhajis (includes leafy vegetables like bathua, palak, chench, tirpaniya, khatta bhaji, laal bhaji, amari patua, Bohar Bhaji), etc. The wheat grown in the region is called sharbati (juicy) or like a sweet refreshing drink. The rotis made from the flour of this wheat are soft and tasty.

== Education ==
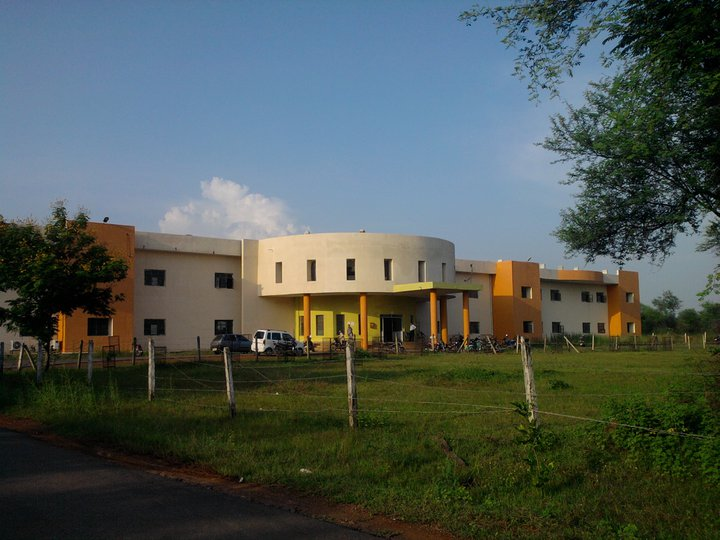
New IT building GGV Bilaspur

Bilaspur has emerged as a prominent educational hub in Chhattisgarh, attracting students from across the state for studies in engineering, medicine, and various competitive examinations. The city is home to several universities and colleges that contribute to its reputation as an educational center.

Bilaspur hosts five universities, including the centrally recognized Guru Ghasidas Vishwavidyalaya and Atal Bihari Vajpayee Vishwavidyalaya, both of which offer a wide range of undergraduate and postgraduate programs. Additionally, specialized institutions like Pandit Sundarlal Sharma (Open) University cater to distance education, while Dr. C. V. Raman University and Maharishi University of Management and Technology focus on innovative and management-oriented courses.

The city also boasts numerous notable colleges, such as the Institute of Technology, Guru Ghasidas University and Chhattisgarh Institute of Medical Sciences, which provide quality education in engineering, medicine, and other disciplines. Government colleges like Govt. E. Raghvendra Rao P.G. Science College have achieved 'A' grade accreditation, underlining the city's academic standards.

Bilaspur's school system includes a mix of public and private institutions, offering diverse educational opportunities from primary to higher secondary levels. Notable schools include Krishna Public School, Delhi Public School, and Kendriya Vidyalaya, which are known for their academic excellence.

The city also supports extracurricular activities, with an active National Cadet Corps (NCC) presence, including one of the 14 army wing NCC battalions from the Raipur group, affiliated with the Madhya Pradesh and Chhattisgarh directorate.

== Media ==
=== Print and news media ===
The city publishes print media newspapers in Hindi languages.

- Live Media
- Patrika
- Dainik Bhaskar
- Nava Bharat
- Hari Bhoomi
- Deshbandhu
- Swadesh News

The following electronic media channels deliver local news 24*7:

- Chhattisgarh Cable Networks (CCN)
- Grand Gumber Channel
- Siti News Channel
- Abhi Tak (CCN owned News Channel)
- Z 24 Ghante – Chhattisgarh Bilaspur Buero
- E TV M.P. CG. Bilaspur Buereu
- Sahara TV M.P. CG. Bilaspur Buereu
- P7 /Pearls News M.P. C.G. Bilaspur
- Aaj Tak, Bilaspur Buereu
- India TV, Bilaspur Buereu

=== Radio ===
Bilaspur city has 5 FM Radio Stations which are-

Frequency Modulation	Channel	Slogan
90.4 FM	Radio Raman (Community Radio Station of Dr. C.V. Raman University – Kota, Bilaspur)	Hamar Radio Hamar Sangi
91.1 FM	FM Tadka	Apni Suno..!
91.9 FM	Radio Orange	Kuch Khatta Kuch Meetha
92.7 FM	Radio Rangila	Jam Ke Suno
94.3 FM	My FM	Jiyo Dil Se
103.2 FM	All India Radio Bilaspur & Vividh Bharti	Desh Ki Surili Dhadkan

=== TV/Doordarshan ===
- Bilaspur has High Power TV Transmitter of Doordarshan at Bahatarai

=== Web portals ===
Website name	URL	Notes
Bilaspur- Government Website	http://bilaspur.gov.in/	Official government website for the city. Land records and other e-governance projects are available from here.
Bilaspur University- ABVV	https://bilaspuruniversity.ac.in/	Portal for almost all the higher education institutions in bilaspur, all affiliated with Bilaspur university
Bilaspur- CIMS Medical College	http://cimsbilaspur.ac.in/	Official government website for the CIMS-Chandu lal Agrawal Memorial (कोयला वाले) medical College, Bilaspur

== Notable people ==
- Rai Saheb Mulji Jagmal - railway, civil contractor, coal mines owner & philanthropist
- Leslie Claudius, former Olympic field hockey player. He has distinction of being one of only two Indian players to win four Olympic medals
- Balakrishna Shivram Moonje (B. S. Moonje) was a leader of the Hindu Mahasabha
- Satyadev Dubey, Padmabhushan, theater director, actor, playwright, screenwriter. He directed Amrish Puri in Andha Yug and known for Junoon (1979), Bhumika (1977) and Aakrosh (1980)
- Makhanlal Chaturvedi wrote Pushp ki Abhilaashaa (Hindi: पुष्प की अभिलाषा) in Bilaspur Central Jail when he was prison by British for sedition charges.
- Bimal Mitra was a renowned Bengali writer with more than one hundred novels and short stories. One of his most popular novel Shaheb Bibi Golam was adopted in Hindi movie. He served in railways in Bilaspur for long year.
- Bilasa Devi, founder of Bilaspur city and amazon of Chhattisgarh
- Satyajeet Dubey, voice and film actor
- Ajit Jogi, first chief minister of the state of Chhattisgarh
- Ingrid Mcleod, a nominated Lok Sabha member representing India's Anglo-Indian community
- Shrikant Verma, a noted poet and Member of Parliament
- Arun Sao, former member of parliament from Bilaspur Lok Sabha seat and deputy chief minister of Chhattisgarh
- Jagannath Prasad Bhanu, Hindi scholar and writer of poetry and prose
- Tokhan Sahu, elected MP from Bilaspur Lok Sabha seat and a Minister of State for Housing and Urban Affairs of India
- Shanker Shesh, playwright, author, poet and story writer
