= National Highway 130A (India) =

National highway in India

National Highway 130A
- Map of the National Highway in red

Route information
- Auxiliary route of NH 30
- Length: 279.4 km (173.6 mi)

Major junctions
- West end: Pondi
- East end: Pathalgaon

Location
- Country: India
- States: Chhattisgarh

Highway system
- Roads in India; Expressways; National; State; Asian
← NH 30	→ NH 43

National Highway 130A, commonly referred to as NH 130A is a national highway in India. It connects Pondi-Mungeli - Bilaspur-Sipat - Pathalgaon. It is a spur road of National Highway 30. NH-130A traverses the state of Chhattisgarh in India.

== Route ==
Pondi, Pandaria, Mungeli, Bilaspur, Sipat, Dhania, Baloda, Panthora, Gumiya, Urga, Hasti, Bhaisma, Nonbira, Dharamjayagarh, Pathalgaon.

== Junctions ==
NH 30 Terminal near Pondi.
NH 45 near Bilaspur.
NH 130 near Bilaspur.
NH 49 near Bilaspur.
NH 149B near Urga.
NH 43 Terminal near Pathalgaon.

== See also ==
- List of national highways in India
- List of national highways in India by state
