= Takhatpur =

- Nagar Palika
- Location in Chhattisgarh, India Takhatpur (India)
- Coordinates: 22°07′45″N 81°52′11″E
- Country: India
- State: Chhattisgarh
- District: Bilaspur
- Founder: Raja Takhat Singh of Kalchuri Dynasty

Government
  - Body: Nagar Palika
  - MLA: Dharmjeet Singh Thakur (BJP)
- Elevation: 269 m (883 ft)

Population (2011)
  - Total: 21,968

Languages
  - Official: Hindi, Chhattisgarhi, Sindhi

Villages
  - Official: Achanakpur, Amane, Amoli Kapa
- Time zone: UTC+5:30 (IST)
- Vehicle registration: CG 10

Takhatpur is a Nagar Palika in Bilaspur district in the Indian state of Chhattisgarh.

== Geography ==
Takhatpur is located at 22.12915°N 81.86959°E. It has an average elevation of 269 metres (883 ft).

It has a state Technical Education college named JMP College, which is associated with Bilaspur University. One Polytechnic College is in Takhatpur, it situated in near Bardahi Pool, Vill Khapri. One Milk or Dairy Institution college in Takhatpur.

== Political scenario ==
Mr. Dharamjeet Singh is the Current MLA of Takhatpur.

Mrs. Ravinder Kaur (Pooja Makkad) is the Chairman of Municipal Corporation (Nagar Palika) Takhatpur.

Mr. Anil Singh Thakur is the Chairman of Whole Business Association Takhatpur.

Late Shri Manharanlal Pandey was elected as MLA five times from Takhatpur. He served as Home, Irrigation and Jail minister in unified MP state. He was also a member of the 11th Lok Sabha of India. He represented the Janjgir constituency of Chhattisgarh and is a member of the Bharatiya Janata Party.

In the legislative elections of 2018, Dr. (Mrs.) Rashmi Ashish Singh of Indian National Congress won with a margin of 2500 votes against 'Santosh Kaushik' from Janta Congress Chhattisgarh and the BJP candidate Mrs. Harshita Pandey got third position. Mrs.Rashmi ashish singh is the Daughter in law of ex MLA of Takhatpur Mr. Balram Singh Thakur and Daughter of ex MLA of Takhatpur Mr. Rohini Kumar Bajpai.

Mr. Balram Singh Thakur, two times MLA of Takhatpur played a major role in the development of Takhatpur.

Raju Singh Kshatri, a two-term MLA representing Takhatpur in the Chhattisgarh Legislative Assembly, initially entered public service as the Chairman of the local Krishi Upaj Mandi.

Before Raju sing Kshatriya [Mrs].Shakun Bai Kaushik is first {[krishi upaj mandi adhyaksh]} in Takhatur . She is wife of [Mr]. Chhote lal Kaushik ex [Bharatiya Janata Party] Mandal Adhyaksh of Takhatpur.

Mr. Jagjit Singh Makkad( Ex MLA ), Mr P.C.A Julius Mr. Kuddus Ansari, Mr. Shrikant Kanhaiyalal Mishra (lecturer), Mr. Suresh Singh Thakur (Ek Parshad) are prominent residents of Takhatpur and have contributed to the area's educational and medical welfare.Mr. Indrajeet Singh & Mr Vivek Pandey is a prominent leader and advocate who is working towards the social welfare of the local communities..

Mrs. Harshita Pandey Ex president of Chhattisgarh State women commission and presently member of National women commission is a prominent women BJP leader from Takhatpur but lost the State Assembly election in 2018. She is daughter of Late Shri Manharanlal Pandey (Ex Home Minister of MP).

Mr. Indrajeet Singh Thakur is Appointed as Notary Advocate in Takhatpur Consistency.

Mr Anirudh Dwivedi two times state leader of abvp does work for welfare of students and he was teacher also.

There are a total of 2,22,883 voters in the seat, which includes 1,13,700 male voters, and 1,09,172 female voters. In the 2018 Chhattisgarh elections, Takhatpur recorded a voter turnout of 73.04%. In 2013 the turnout was 77.11%, and in 2008 it was 69.92%.

== Demographics ==
As of 2001 Indian census, Takhatpur had a population of 22,989. Males constitute 51% of the population and females 49%. Takhatpur has an average literacy rate of 68%, higher than the national average of 59.5%: male literacy is 76%, and female literacy is 59%. In Takhatpur, 14% of the population is under 6 years of age.
