= Bilha =

Bilha may refer to:

- Bilha, India, a town in Chhattisgarh
- Bilhah, Rachel's handmaid in the Book of Genesis
