= Baikunth =

Planned township in Chhattisgarh, India

Baikunth is a small planned township in Chhattisgarh state of India. It is located 40 kilometers (25 miles) away from Raipur city on the Raipur-Bilaspur railway line. It was created for housing the employees of the Century Cement manufacturing plant, which became operational in the early 1970s.

The name Baikunth was derived from the first letters of the 3 villages that surrounded it - Ba from Bahesar, Kun from Kundru, and T from Tandwa.

The township has a population of approximately 3000, but it employs a lot more folks from nearby villages and towns namely, Tilda, Kundru, Bahesar, Tulsi, etc.

At its inception, this place had just 3 trees. By the end of 2015, this place had more than 471,000 trees. The township has 3 distinct zones: the mine that provides the limestone; the cement manufacturing plant; the residential quarters with a club, a school, college, a branch of UCO bank, a hospital, a post office, shopping center with an ATM, temples, airstrip, a lake, parks, and playgrounds.

== Gallery ==
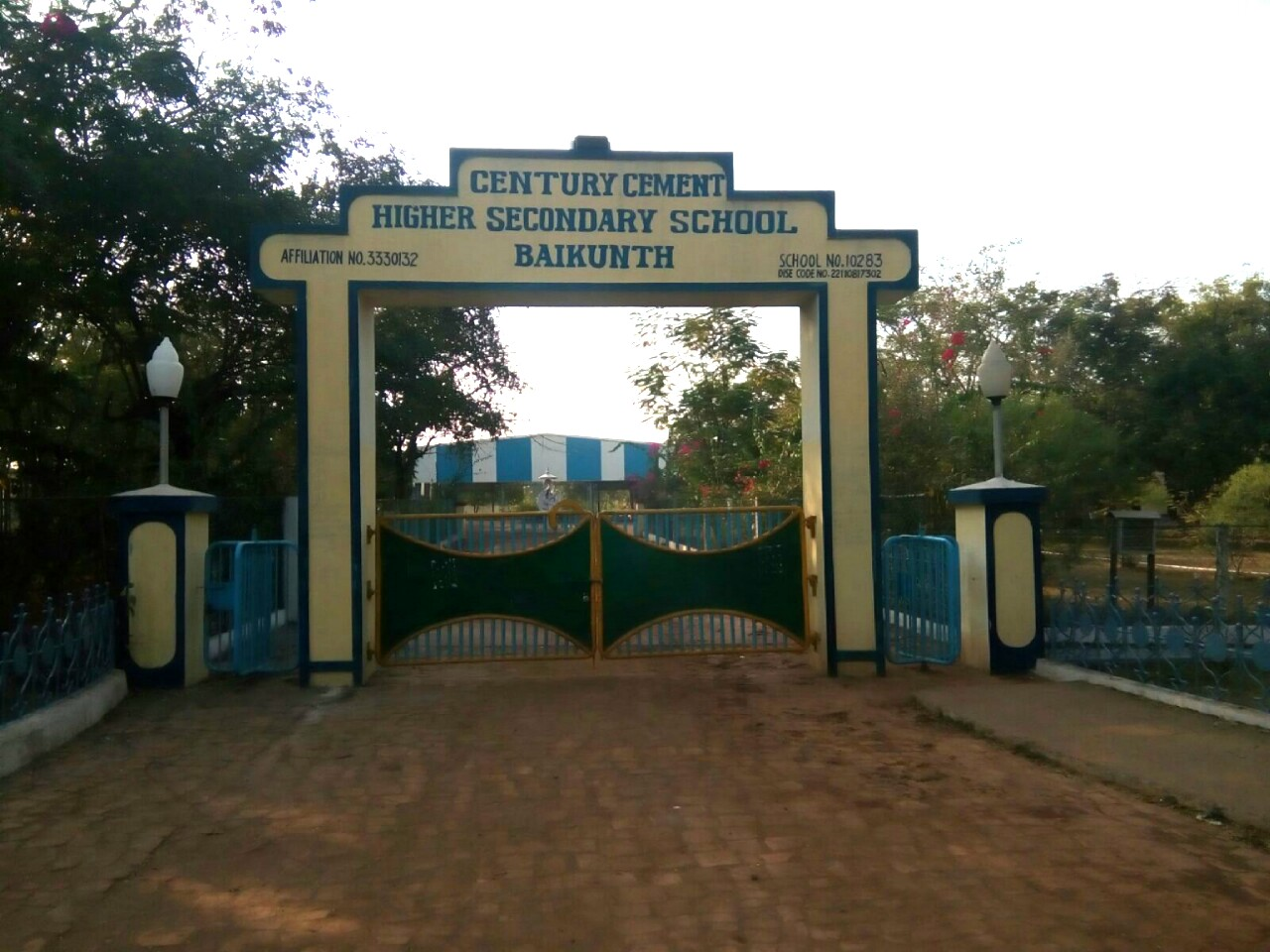
CCHS School Baikunth

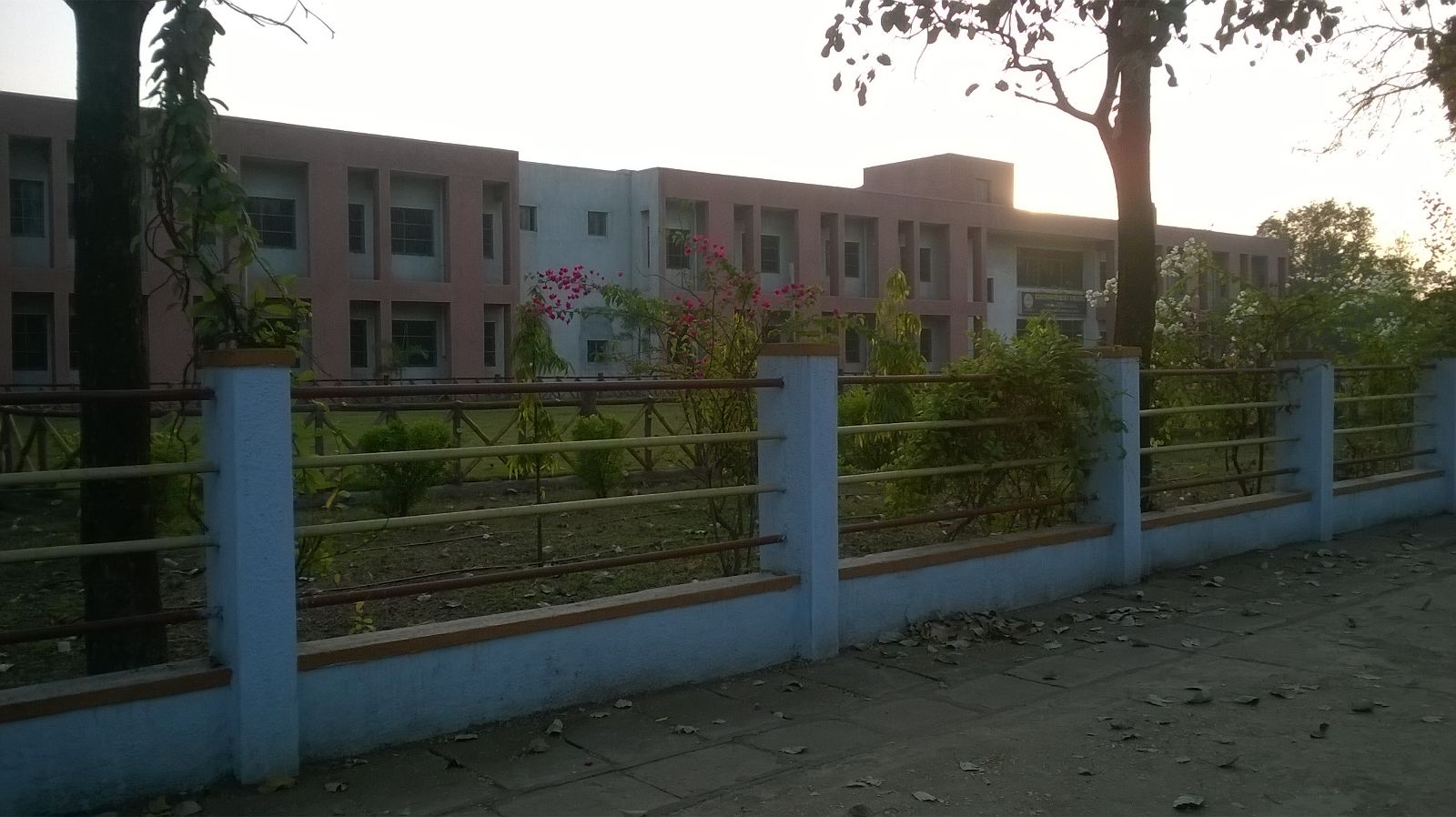
Century Cement College Baikunth

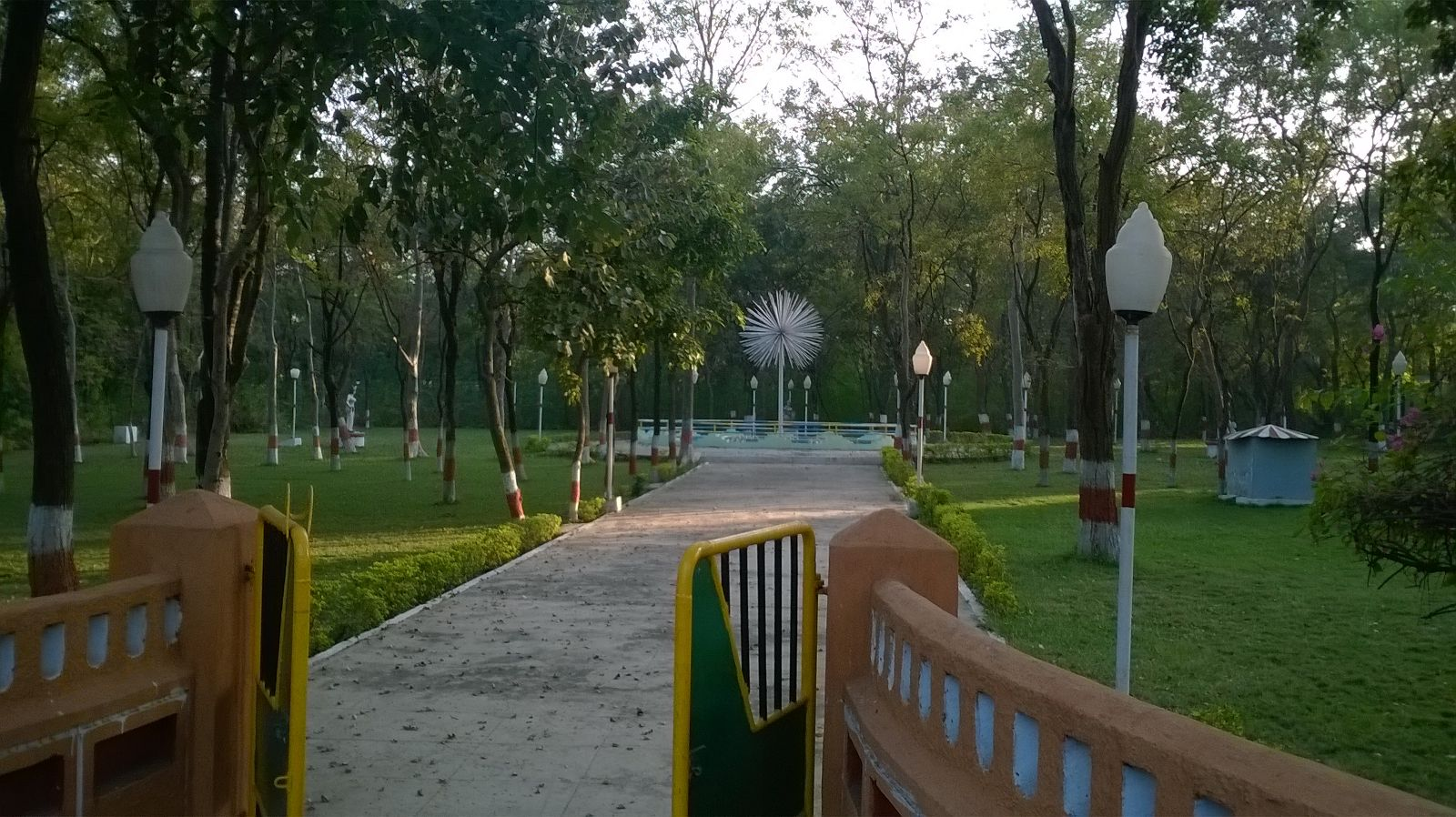
Staff Club Garden

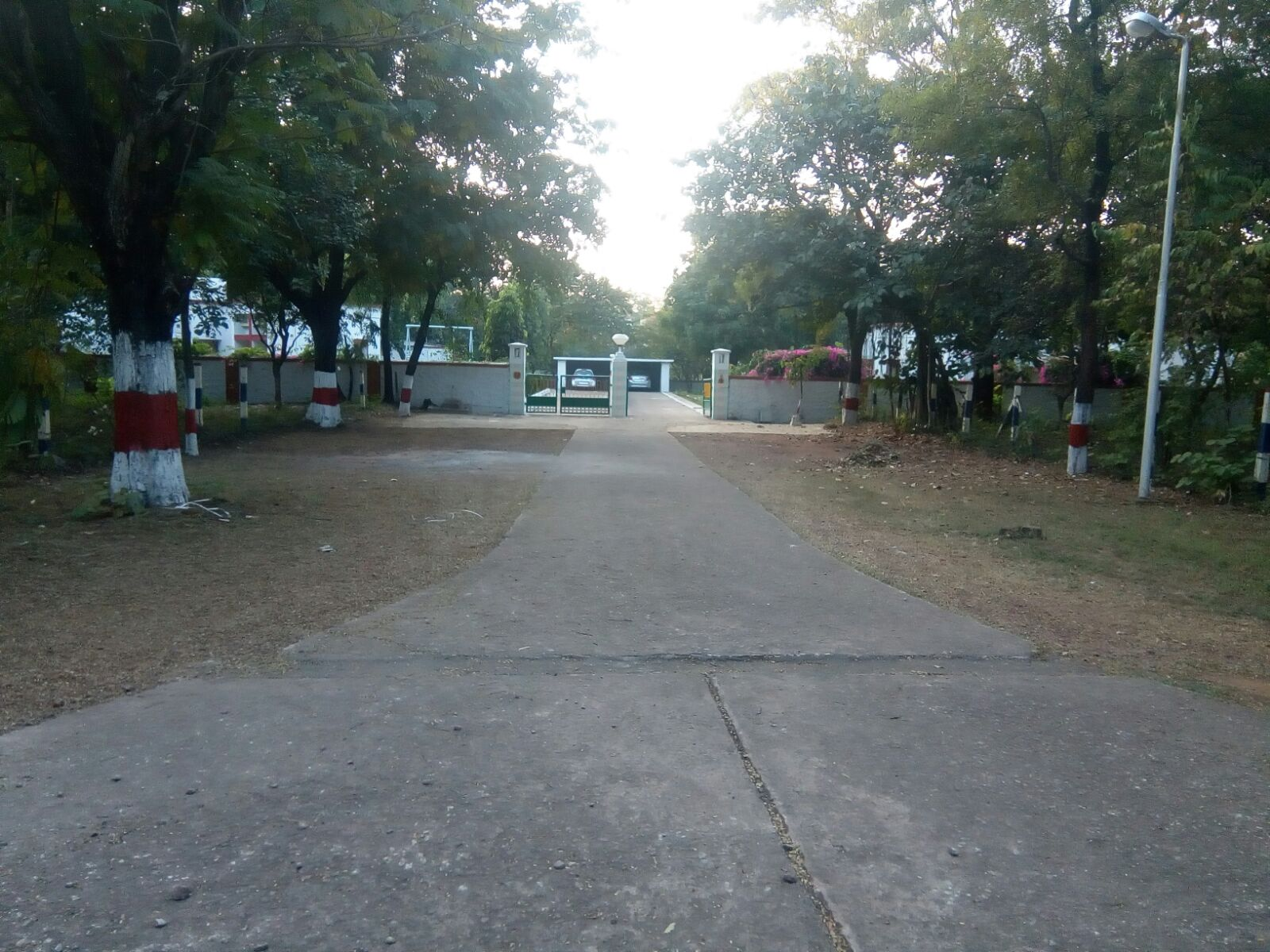
Senior Executive Residence Baikunth
