= National Highway 45 (India) =

National highway in India

National Highway 45
- Map of the National Highway in red

Route information
- Length: 652 km (405 mi)

Major junctions
- West end: Obaidullaganj
- East end: Bilaspur

Location
- Country: India
- States: Madhya Pradesh 504 kilometres (313 mi), Chhattisgarh 148 kilometres (92 mi)

Highway system
- Roads in India; Expressways; National; State; Asian
← NH 46	→ NH 130

National Highway 45 (NH 45) is a primary national highway in India. This highway runs in the states, Sagartola, Sursatola, Gadasarai, Dindori of Madhya Pradesh and Chhattisgarh. The route of NH-45 was extended from Jabalpur to Bilaspur in June 2016. Unlike most national highways in India, NH 45 has no spur routes.

== Route ==
Schematic map of National Highways in India

NH45 traverses the states of Madhya Pradesh and Chhattisgarh in India.

Madhya Pradesh

Obaidullaganj, Bareli, Tendukheda, Jabalpur, Kundam, Shahpura, Dindori, Sonbraj, Bajang Mal, Hanumat Khol

Chhattisgarh

Hanumat Khol - Kukudur, Pandariya, Lorhmi, Bilaspur

To conserve Wildlife in Amarkantak Hill Range & in Achanakmar Wildlife Sanctuary, the stretch of NH45 between Gadasarai & Kota Mohandi via Amarkantak is now excluded & stretch from Gadasarai to Kota Mohandi via Bajang Mal, Hanumat Khol, Pandariya is included

== Junctions ==
NH 46 Terminal near Obedullaganj.
NH 44 (Rajmarg)Interchange near village Paloha
NH 34 near Jabalpur
NH 30 near Jabalpur
NH 543 near Dindori
NH 130A near Bilaspur
NH 130 Terminal near Bilaspur.

== See also ==
- List of national highways in India
- List of national highways in India by state
