= Mehmand =

- village
- Location in Chhattisgarh, India Mehmand (India)
- Coordinates: 22.035509°N 82.203629°E
- Country: India
- State: Chhattisgarh
- District: Bilaspur

Government
  - Type: Gram panchayat

Population (2001)
  - Total: 5,765

Languages
  - Official: Hindi, Chhattisgarhi
- Time zone: UTC+5:30 (IST)
- Vehicle registration: CG

Mehmand is a census town in Bilaspur district in the Indian state of Chhattisgarh.

== Demographics ==
As of 2001 India census, Mehmand had a population of 5765. Males constitute 52% of the population and females 48%. Mehmand has an average literacy rate of 53%, lower than the national average of 59.5%: male literacy is 66%, and female literacy is 39%. In Mehmand, 18% of the population is under 6 years of age.
