= Sirgiti =

Sirgitti
- city
- Location in Chhattisgarh, India Sirgitti (India)
- Coordinates: 22.055389°N 82.137398°E
- Country: India
- State: Chhattisgarh
- District: Bilaspur

Population (2001)
  - Total: 12,469

Languages
  - Official: Hindi, Chhattisgarhi
- Time zone: UTC+5:30 (IST)
- Vehicle registration: CG

Sirgiti is a census town in Bilaspur district in the Indian state of Chhattisgarh.

== Demographics ==
As of 2001 India census, Sirgiti had a population of 12,469. Males constitute 52% of the population and females 48%. Sirgiti has an average literacy rate of 64%, higher than the national average of 59.5%: male literacy is 75%, and female literacy is 52%. In Sirgiti, 15% of the population is under 6 years of age.
