= Jagannath Prasad Bhanu =

Hindi writer (1859-1945)

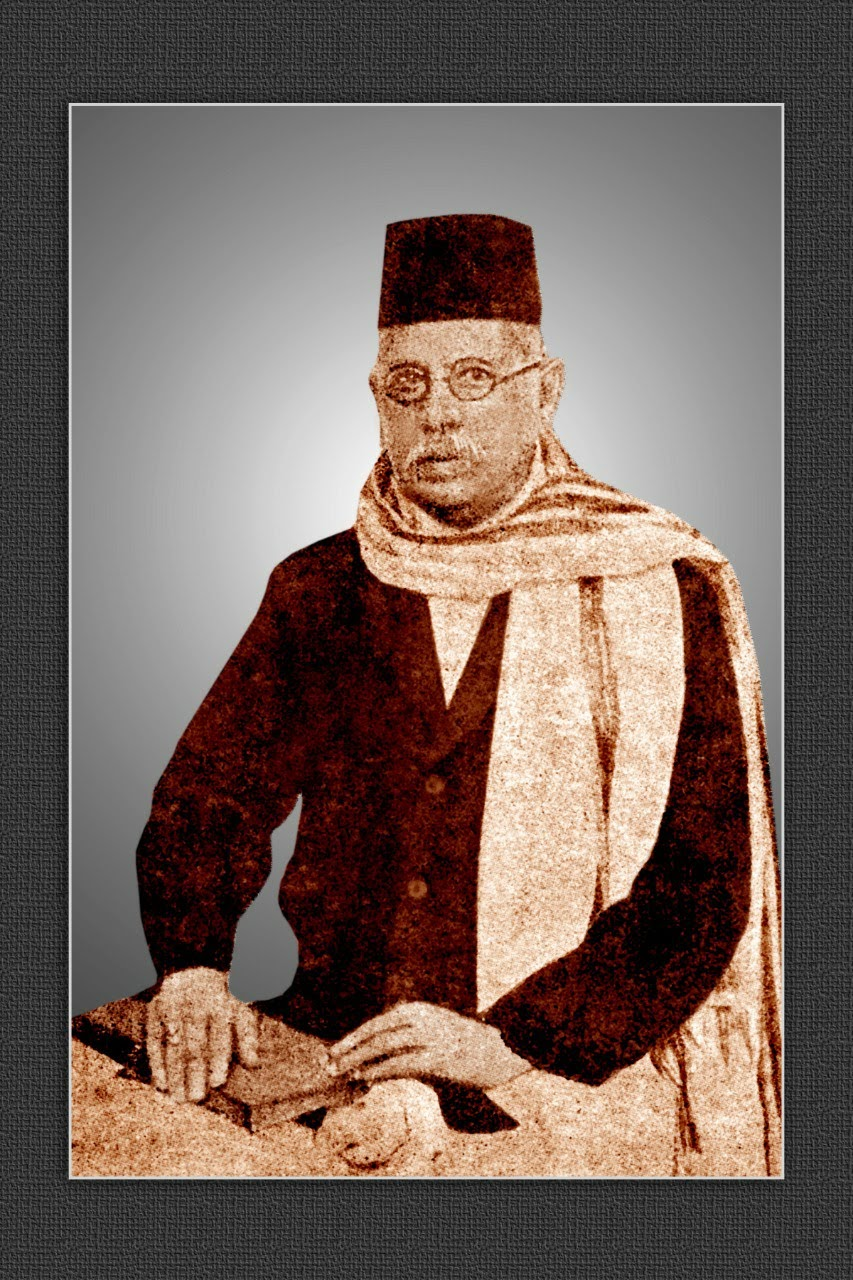
Photograph of Jagannath Prasad Bhanu

Jagannath Prasad Bhanu (Hindi: जगन्नाथ प्रसाद भानु, 8 August 1859 – 25 October 1945) was a Hindi scholar of poetry and prose. He is recognized as a pioneering scholar of aesthetics in Hindi. His best known work was the Chandaḥprabhākara, a work of Hindi prose, published in nine editions during his life.

== Life ==
Jagannath Prasad Bhanu was born on 8 August 1859 at Nagpur to Bakhshi Ram, the capital of then Central Provinces. He spent most of his life in Bilaspur in modern-day Chhattisgarh. He was a scholar of Hindi, Sanskrit, Prakrit, English, Urdu, Persian, Odia and Marathi. He was especially interested in linguistics and mathematics.

In 1940, Bhanu received the title of Mahamahopadhyaya. He died in 1945.

== Major works ==
- Chandaḥprabhākara (1894): A Hindi prose work. This popular work saw many editions during his lifetime, and was published in its ninth edition in 1939.
- Navapañcāmṛta Rāmāyaṇa (1897): This is a work based on the Ramcharitmanas.
- Kāvyaprabhākara (1909): A work on poetics in Hindi.
- Chanda Sārāvalī (1917).
- Alaṅkāra Praśnottarī (1918).
- Hindī Kāvyālaṅkāra (1918).
- Kāvya Prabandha (1918).
- Kāvya Kusumāñjali (1920).
- Nāyikā Bheda Śaṅkāvalī (1925).
- Rasaratnākara (1927): A work on aesthetics in Hindi.
- Śrī Tulasī Tatva Prakāśa (1931).
- Rāmāyaṇa Varṇāvalī (1936).
- Alaṅkāra Darpaṇa (1936).
- Śrī Tulasī Bhāva Prakāśa (1937).
