= Bilasa Devi Kevat Airport =

Airport in Chhattisgarh India

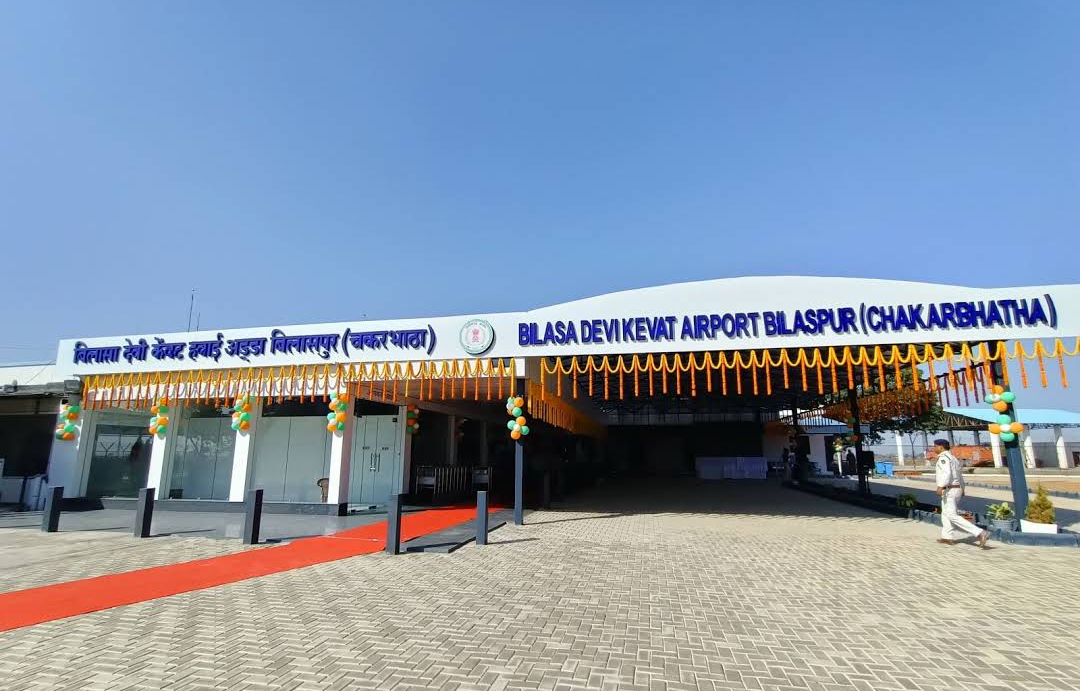
- IATA: PAB; ICAO: VEBU

Summary
- Airport type: Public
- Operator: Government of Chhattisgarh
- Serves: Bilaspur
- Location: Chakarbhata, Bilaspur, Chhattisgarh, India
- Opened: 1942; 84 years ago
- Elevation AMSL: 274 m (899 ft)
- Coordinates: 21°59′18″N 82°06′40″E
- Website: Bilaspur Airport

Maps
- Location of airport in Chhattisgarh PAB (India)
- Interactive map of Bilasa Devi Kevat Airport

Runways
| Direction | Length | | Surface |
| Direction | m | ft | Surface |
|---|---|---|---|
| 17/35 | 1,535 | 5,035 | Asphalt |

Statistics (April 2025 - March 2026)
- Passengers: 36,443 (▼ -1.1%)
- Aircraft movements: 1,054 (▼ -2%)
- Cargo tonnage: —
- Source: AAI

Bilasa Devi Kevat Airport (IATA: PAB, ICAO: VEBU), also known as Bilaspur Airport, is a domestic airport serving the city of Bilaspur, Chhattisgarh, India. It is located at Chakarbhata, 10 km (6.2 mi) south from the city centre. The airport made by the Royal Indian Air Force in 1942, making it the first and oldest airport of Chhattisgarh. It is owned by the Airports Authority of India. In 1980s, the airport was used by Vayudoot to provide flights to Bhopal, Nagpur, Mumbai and Delhi. Currently, commercial scheduled flights are operated by Alliance Air to Bhopal, Delhi, Jabalpur and Prayagraj. It is named after Bilasa Bai Kevtin, a renowned 16th-century personality known for her bravery and courage to fight against difficult situations, who belonged to a fishermen tribe residing near the Arpa River.

== History ==
Built in 1942, it opened as Royal Indian Air Force Station, Bilaspur, in the Central Provinces of British India. It was used as an airfield during World War II. It was used by No. 267 Squadron, No. 96 Squadron, No. 10 Squadron, and other units. No. 673 Squadron undertook sporadic glider training and courses in jungle warfare in 1945 in the air force station. It never undertook operational duties because of the Japanese surrender. Some operational missions were undertaken; however the pilots of this squadron detached to other units, flying Dakotas and L-5 Sentinels. The squadron disbanded at Kargi Road Airstrip, another military airfield in Bilaspur, on 25 October 1945. After India got independence from Great Britain, the airfield was transferred to the war department of the Government of India. The Directorate General of Civil Aviation (DGCA) took control of the airport, followed by the Ministry of Civil Aviation.

The airport was associated with commercial flight operations to Nagpur, Aurangabad, Mumbai, Raipur and Bhopal in 1988, operated by Vayudoot.

The Indian Army intends to take over the airport and establish a training facility for the special forces. The existing para-military commando training facility at Nahan, Himachal Pradesh is to be shifted to Bilaspur, Chhattisgarh. The Army wants use of the entire airport, while AAI has made a "conditional offer" of parting with 377 acres, while retaining 56 acres for a civil enclave. On 7 December 2018, the airport got the commercial licence from the DGCA for operating commercial flights by using 19-seater aircraft. On 27 January 2021, the airport got the commercial licence from DGCA for operating commercial flights, this time for 72-seater aircraft. On 2 February 2021, the former Union Minister of Civil Aviation, Hardeep Singh Puri, announced that commercial flight services will be operational from the airport to Prayagraj, Delhi, Bhopal and Jabalpur from 1 March 2021. As of May 2023, Alliance Air operates regular and weekly flights to Bhopal, Indore, Prayagraj and Jabalpur.

== Airfield ==
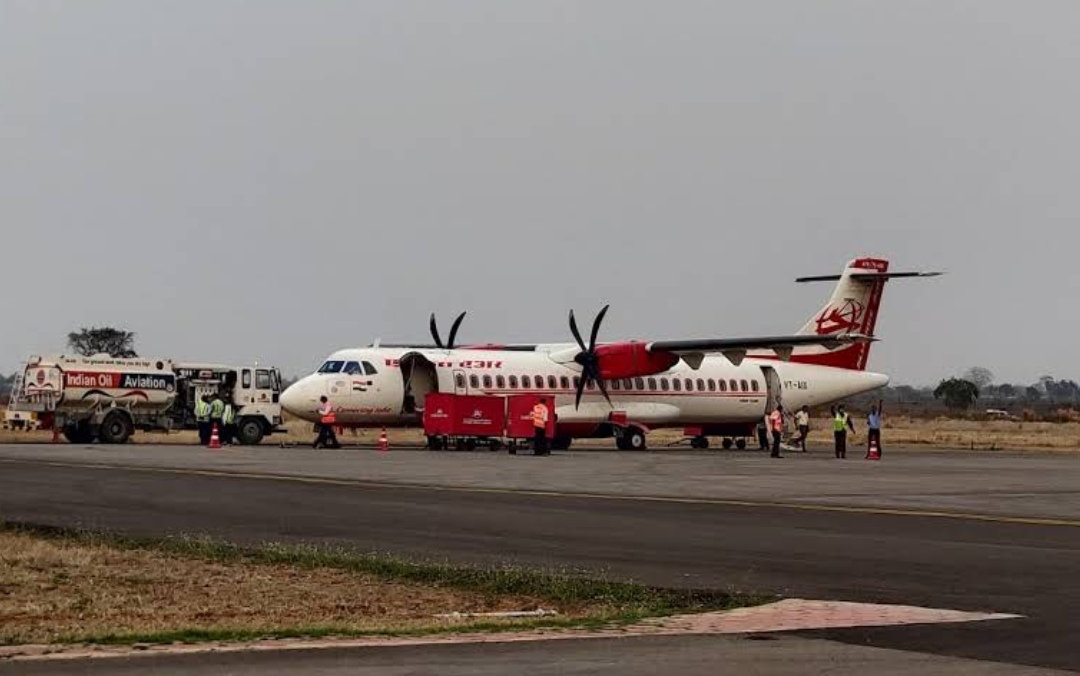
Apron area of the airport

The airport has a passenger terminal, an Air Traffic Control (ATC) tower and one runway, oriented 17/35, is 1,535 metres long and 30 metres wide, with turning pads at both ends. A 630-metre long taxiway connects the runway to a small helipad-cum-apron, among other ancillary facilities, like a fire station. It is situated at an elevation of 276 metres above mean sea level.

The runway at present caters to only ATR-72 type aircraft, which is too small for handling larger aircraft like the Boeing 737 and Airbus A320, which need a runway at least 2,190 metres in length and 45 metres in width (6,860 ft.). This means low-cost carriers like IndiGo, AIX Connect and Go First, which have a fleet of the types of aircraft mentioned above, cannot serve the airport until the runway is extended and widened.

== Airlines and destinations ==
| Airlines | Destinations |
|---|---|
| Alliance Air | Delhi, Kolkata, Prayagraj |

== 2019 Indefinite Strike ==
On 26 October 2019, a large number of local residents began an indefinite strike to protest against the Central and State Governments for demanding more air connectivity from the airport, at a city townhall, named Raghvendra Rao Bhawan. Their demands were as follows:

- The airport should be upgraded to a full-fledged 4C category airport, by expanding the runway to facilitate larger aircraft to operate, or to develop a new completely new airport.
- Connectivity to metro cities like Delhi, Mumbai, Chennai, Bengaluru, etc.

The people also started gathering on the social media platforms of Twitter and Instagram, by creating a group named "BAAC" (Bilaspur Airport Awareness Campaign), for the same demands, asking directly to the Ministry of Civil Aviation, Chief Minister of Chhattisgarh and the Member of Parliament and Legislative Assembly of Bilaspur constituency to draw their attention towards development of the airport and to take immediate actions. The group on the two social media platforms was created so that people among it share updates and announcements based on the airport's development.

As of May 2023, the airport has been operationalized for 3C operations, and has regular and weekly flights to Delhi via Jabalpur and Allahabad, along with Bhopal and Indore, both of which are suspended due to some issues with the only operating airline, Alliance Air. Local residents of Bilaspur district are still continuing their strike by asking for the airport upgradation from 3C to 4C category.

== See also ==
- Swami Vivekananda International Airport, Raipur
- Jagdalpur Airport
- Jharsuguda Airport
- List of airports in India
- List of the busiest airports in India
