= Bodri =

- Town
- Location in Chhattisgarh, India Bodri (India)
- Coordinates: 22.030761°N 82.111329°E
- Country: India
- State: Chhattisgarh
- District: Bilaspur

Area
  - Total: 18 km^{2} (6.9 sq mi)

Population (2019)
  - Total: 22,320
  - Density: 1,200/km^{2} (3,200/sq mi)

Languages
  - Official: Hindi, Chhattisgarhi
- Time zone: UTC+5:30 (IST)
- Postal code: 495220
- Vehicle registration: CG10

Bodri is a town and a nagar panchayat in Bilaspur district in the state of Chhattisgarh, India.

== Demographics ==
As of 2011 India census, Bodri had a population of 17,481. Males constitute 50.69% of the population and females 49.31%, that is the sex ratio of 973 females for every 1000 males. Bodri has an average literacy rate of 77.74%, higher than the national average of 59.5%; with male literacy of 86.55% and female literacy of 68.71%. 14.15% of the population is under 6 years of age.
