= National Highway 130 (India) =

National highway in India

National Highway 130

Route information
- Length: 291 km (181 mi)

Major junctions
- From: Simga
- To: Ambikapur

Location
- Country: India

Highway system
- Roads in India; Expressways; National; State; Asian
← NH 30	→ NH 43

National Highway 130 is a national highway of India in the state of Chhattisgarh. It connects Ambikapur-Katghora - Bilaspur-Raipur. National Highway Authority of India is upgrading this corridor for the ease of traffic.

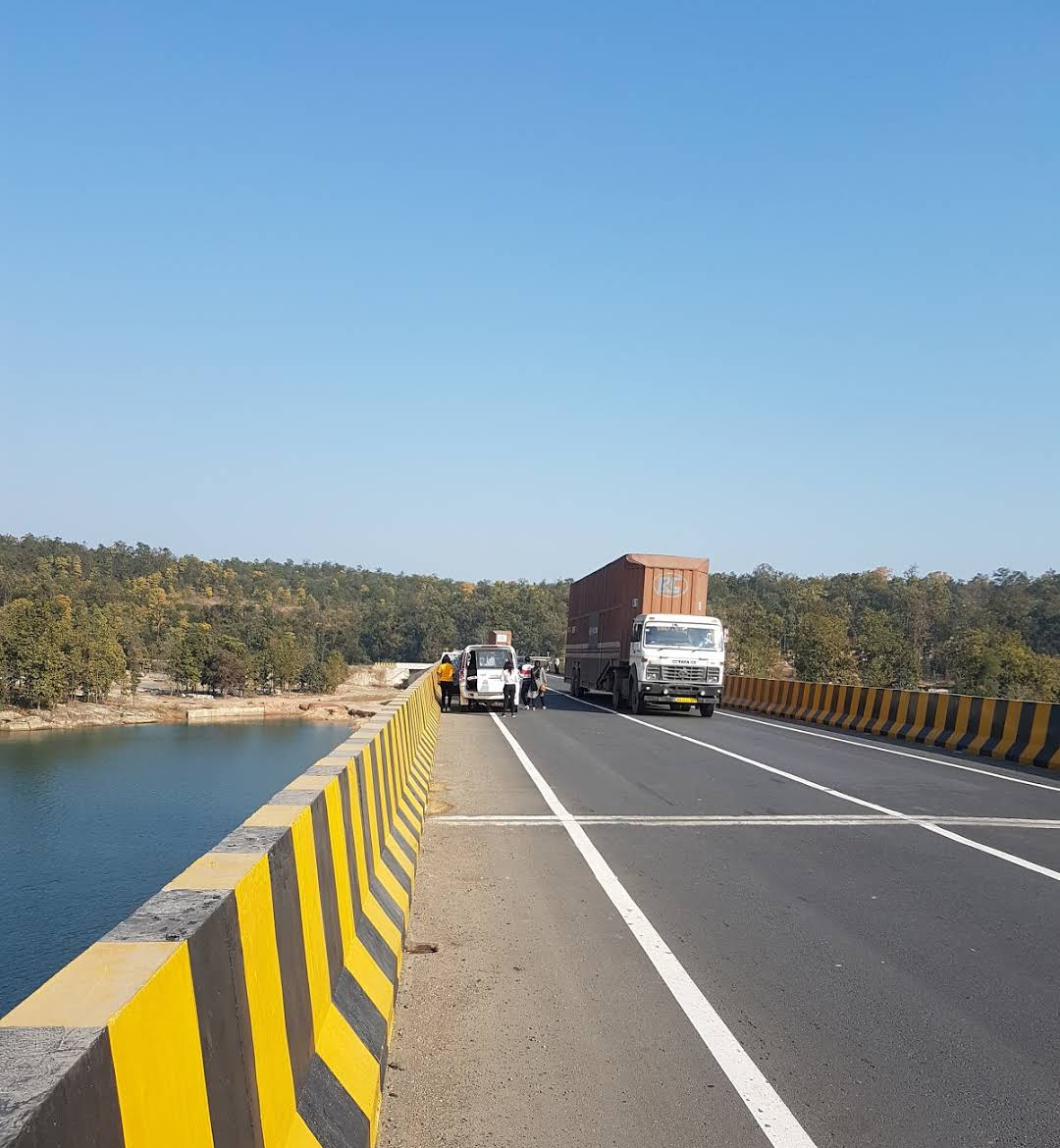
NH 130, Hasdeo River

Proposal of NHAI of upgradation

- Ambikapur - Katghora (2-Lane)
- Katghora - Bilaspur (4-Lane)
- Bilaspur - Simga (4-Lane)
- Simga - Raipur (6-Lane)

Ambikapur=>Lakhanpur=>Maheshpur=>Udaypur=>Katghora(Korba dist.)

== Junctions ==
NH 30 near Simga
NH 49 near Bilaspur
NH 130A near Bilaspur
NH 149B near Katghora
NH 43 near Ambikapur
