= National Highway 49 (India) =

National highway in India

National Highway 49
- Map of National Highway 49 in red

Route information
- Part of AH46
- Length: 668 km (415 mi) Bharatmala: 350 km (220 mi) (Deogarh - Kharagpur)

Major junctions
- West end: Bilaspur, Chhattishgarh
- East end: Kharagpur, West Bengal

Location
- Country: India
- States: Chhattishgarh, Odisha, Jharkhand, West Bengal

Highway system
- Roads in India; Expressways; National; State; Asian
← NH 130	→ NH 16

National Highway 49 (combination of old NH 6 and NH 200) is a primary National Highway in India. This highway runs from Bilaspur in the Indian state of Chhattisgarh to Kharagpur in West Bengal. Starting from NH 130 near Bilaspur, it terminates at NH 16 near Kharagpur, West Bengal. The highway is part of AH46 network in India. This national highway is 668 km (415 mi) long.

== Route ==
Schematic map of National Highways in India

NH49 transits through the Chhattishgarh, Odisha, Jharkhand and West Bengal, four states of India.

Chhattisgarh

Bilaspur, Saragaon, Sakti, Raigarh

Odisha

Kanaktora, Jharsuguda, Kuchinda, Pravasuni, Deogarh, Barakot, Pal Laharha, Kendujhargarh, Turumunga, Chadheibhol, Jashipur, Bangriposi

Jharkhand

Baharagora

West Bengal

Feko, Lodashuli(Jhargram), Kharagpur

== Junctions ==
NH 130 Terminal near Bilaspur.
NH 149B near Saragaon
NH 153 near Raigarh
NH 53 near Debagarh
NH 143 near Barkote
NH 149 near Pallahara
NH 20 near Kendujhar
NH 220 near Jashipur
NH 18 near Baharagora
NH 14 near Kharagpur
NH 16 Terminal near Kharagpur.

== See also ==
- List of national highways in India
- National Highways Development Project
