= James Forsyth (traveller) =

British traveller

James Forsyth (1838–1871) was an English traveller in India.

== Life ==
After receiving a university education in England, and taking his degree of M.A., Forsyth entered the civil service of the East India Company, and went out to India as assistant conservator and acting conservator of forests. In a short time he was appointed settlement officer and deputy-commissioner of Nimar, and served under Sir Richard Temple, 1st Baronet, Chief Commissioner of the Central Provinces.

Forsyth was attached to the Bengal staff corps, and made a complete tour of the Central Provinces of India in 1862–4. He reached Amarkantak, near the sources of the Narmada River, the Mahanadi River, and the Son River. He travelled across the plain of Chhattisgarh to the sál forests in the east.

Forsyth died in London 1 May 1871.

== Works ==
Forsyth acquired wide reputation as a hunter, and in 1862 published a treatise on the Sporting Rifle and its Projectiles. In 1870 he prepared an account of his explorations, with which he returned to England towards the close of that year. Arrangements were made for the publication of the work, but the author died while the sheets were passing through the press. It appeared posthumously (November 1871), under the title of The Highlands of Central India; Notes on their Forests and Wild Tribes, Natural History, and Sports.
