= Atal Bihari Vajpayee Vishwavidyalaya =

University in Chhattisgarh

- Motto: योगः कर्मशु कौशलं
- Motto in English: Excellence in Action is Knowledge
- Type: Public
- Established: 2012; 14 years ago
- Affiliations: UGC, AIU
- Chancellor: Governor of Chhattisgarh
- Vice-Chancellor: Dr. Lalit Prakash Pateriya
- Location: Bilaspur, Chhattisgarh, India; 22.0765°N 82.1646°E
- Campus: Rural
- Website: www.bilaspuruniversity.ac.in

Atal Bihari Vajpayee Vishwavidyalaya, renamed from Bilaspur University, is a public state university located in Bilaspur, Chhattisgarh, India. It is established by the Gazette notification on 03.02.2012 of Chhattisgarh Act No 07, 2012, the Chhattisgarh Vishwavidyalaya (Amendment) Act, 2011 and came in to its existence in June, 2012. The University is situated on in front of Koni Police Thana ,Bilaspur- Ratanpur Road, Koni ,Bilaspur (C.G) 495009.

Founded in 2012, it is a teaching-cum-affiliating university which affiliates colleges and has 6 departments. After the act, it was initially located at Old High Court in Bilaspur, Chhattisgarh and presently the campus is in Koni, Bilaspur, Chhattisgarh. University has more than 110 affiliated colleges which includes UG, PG and Ph.D. programs.

In a report by Dainik Bhaskar, the newspaper states that positions for professors in the University were not filled due to State Government disapproval.

== Academics ==
Atal Bihari Vajpayee University offers Bachelor and Masters as well as various Diplomas and certificate programs in many disciplines.

- Bachelor of Commerce (Hons.)
- Masters of Commerce
- Bachelor of Science in Food Processing & Technology
- Master of Science in Food Processing & Technology
- Bachelor of Science in Computer Science & Application(Hons.)
- Master of Science in Computer Science & Application(Hons.)
- Bachelor in Hotel Management (BHM)
- Master of Science in Microbiology & Bio-Informatics
- PG Diploma in Yoga sciences.

== Affiliated colleges ==
Its jurisdiction extends over 4 districts: Bilaspur, Gaurela-Pendra-Marwahi, Korba, and Mungeli.
