= National Highway 149B (India) =

National highway in India

National Highway 149B
- Map of the National Highway in red

Route information
- Length: 110 km (68 mi)

Major junctions
- South end: SaragaonChampa
- North end: Katghora

Location
- Country: India
- States: Chhattisgarh

Highway system
- Roads in India; Expressways; National; State; Asian
← NH 49	→ NH 130

National Highway 149B, commonly called NH 149B is a national highway in India. It is a spur road of National Highway 49. NH-149B traverses the state of Chhattisgarh in India.

== Route ==
Saragaon, Champa, Korba, Chhuri, Katghora. The wiki map needs correction to match official NHAI

== Junctions ==
The following table lists the major junctions of National Highway 149B, starting from its southern terminus at Saragaon.

State	District	Location	Kilometre	Destinations
Chhattisgarh	Janjgir–Champa	Saragaon	0	NH 49
Chhattisgarh	Korba	Urga	38	NH 130A
Chhattisgarh	Korba	Katghora	110	NH 130

== See also ==
- List of national highways in India
- List of national highways in India by state
