= Bilha, India =

Bilha
- city
- Location within Chhattisgarh Location within India
- Coordinates: 21°57′N 82°03′E
- Country: India
- State: Chhattisgarh
- District: Bilaspur

Population (2001)
  - Total: 8,992

Languages
  - Official: Hindi, Chhattisgarhi
- Time zone: UTC+5:30 (IST)
- Vehicle registration: CG

Bilha is a city and a nagar panchayat in Bilaspur district in the state of Chhattisgarh, India.

== Demographics ==
The Biggest block in India, as of the 2001 India census Bilha had a population of 8992 of which males constitute 51% and females 49%. The average literacy rate is 58%, which is lower than the national average of 59.5%—male literacy is 68% and female 49%. 17% of the population is under six years of age.

Mr Radhe Shyam Nayak is the CEO of Bilha Janpad Panchayat since May 2016.
