= Bilaspur district, Chhattisgarh =

Coordinates: 22°23′N 82°08′E

Bilaspur district
- District of Chhattisgarh
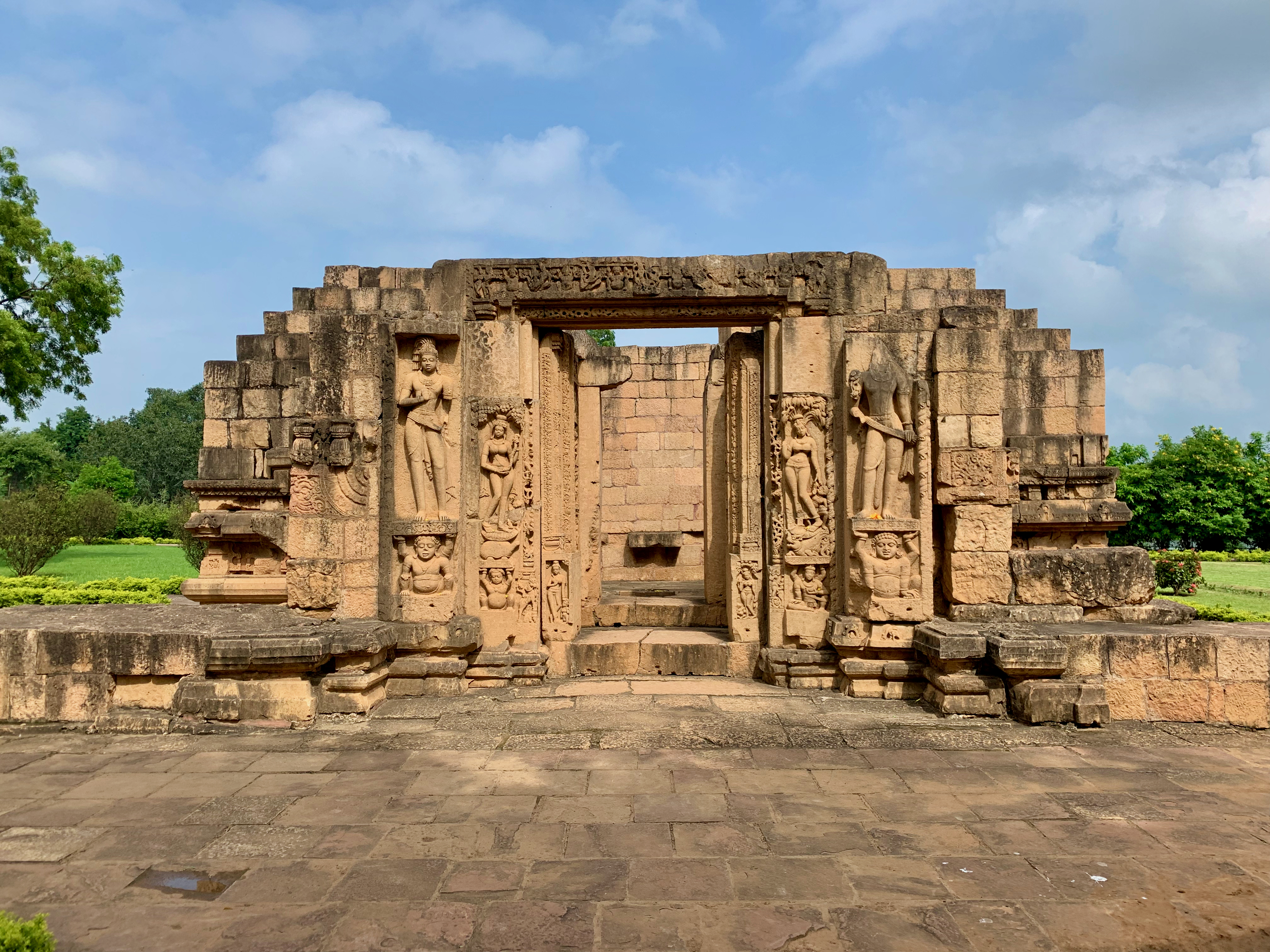
- Bhima Kichak Temple, Malhar
- Interactive map of Bilaspur district
- Country: India
- State: Chhattisgarh
- Division: Bilaspur
- Headquarters: Bilaspur

Government
  - District Collector: Shri Sanjay Agarwal (IAS)

Area
  - Total: 3,476 km^{2} (1,342 sq mi)

Population (2011)
  - Total: 1,625,502
  - Density: 467.6/km^{2} (1,211/sq mi)
- Time zone: UTC+05:30 (IST)
- Website: bilaspur.gov.in/en/

Bilaspur district is a district of the Chhattisgarh state of India. Bilaspur city is the headquarters of the district. As of 2011, it was the second-most populous district in Chhattisgarh (out of 27 districts), after Raipur.

== Etymology ==
The name of the district derived from the city of Bilaspur, the administrative headquarter of the district. The name "Bilaspur" originated from Bilasa Devi, a fisherwoman who founded this city, according to a legend.

== Geography ==
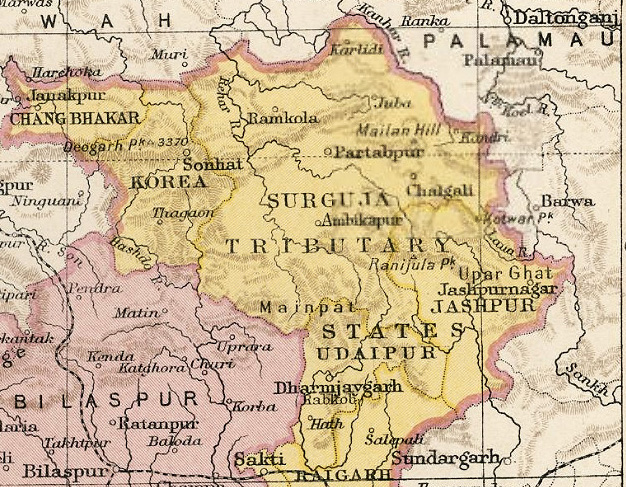
Map in the Imperial Gazetteer of India showing the states of Bilaspur and Surguja, 1931.

Bilaspur district is situated between 21º47' and 23º8' north latitudes and 81º14' and 83º15' east longitudes. The district is bounded by Gaurella-Pendra-Marwahi district on the north, Anuppur District and Dindori district of Madhya Pradesh state on the west, Kabirdham on the southwest, Durg and Raipur on the south and Korba and Janjgir-Champa on the east. The area of the district is 3476 km². Bilaspur is officially the judicial and cultural capital of Chhattisgarh and also hosts various cultural and social events. The district is also an educational and medical hub of Chhattisgarh due to several hospitals, e.g. Apollo Hospital. Education at the primary and higher levels has been considerably improved in the past decade due to the opening of several schools of international standards, including D.A.V. Public School, Delhi Public School, San Francis H/S School, St. Xavier's H/S School, Maharishi Vidya Mandir, and The Jain International School.

The city has also witnessed significant infrastructural growth for the past few years, owing to the several initiatives taken by the state government to improve the basic infrastructure. Today, the city has two developed shopping malls, (Rama Magneto Mall and 36 City Mall, which attracts a large number of people, especially the youth, from across the state.

== History ==
Bilaspur was established by Bilas Deo, Maharaja of Bandhavgarh. The area that comprises present-day Bilaspur District was under the control of the Bhonsla Rajas of Nagpur until 1818 and was governed by a Maratha Subah (district officer). In 1818, the British started administering the area on behalf of the Raghuji III, who was a minor. The area was administered by a commissioner. In 1853, after the death of Raghuji III, British annexed the Nagpur Kingdom to British India as the Nagpur Province, and in 1861 when the new Central Provinces was established, Bilaspur was organized into a separate district. In October 1903, a new province 'The Central Provinces and Berar' was constituted and Bilaspur District became part of the Chhattisgarh Division of the province. In October 1905, following the transfer of Sambalpur District to Bengal Province, Chandrapur-Padampur and Malkhurda estates were transferred to Bilaspur District. In 1906, when the Drug district (present-day Durg District) was formed, a part of the Mungeli Tahsil was transferred to the new district. Also, another part of the district was transferred to the Raipur District. On 25 May 1998, the original Bilaspur District was split into three smaller districts, present Bilaspur, Korba, and Janjgir-Champa.

== Administration ==
Bilaspur Division consists of 11 tehsils.

1. Kota
2. Takhatpur
3. Belagahna
4. Beltara
5. Bilha
6. Bilaspur
7. Bodri
8. Masturi
9. Ratanpur
10. Sakari
11. Sipat

Bilaspur district is composed of 11 tehsils, consisting of one Municipal corporation, three Nagar Palika Parishads, seven Nagar panchayats and four blocks.

The district has a total of 708 villages and 483 Gram Panchayats.

The headquarters of the district is Bilaspur. It is the second-largest city in the state and the seat of the High Court of Chhattisgarh. It is known as the Nyaydhani (judicial capital) of Chhattisgarh. Bilaspur is home to the famous Kanan Pendari Zoo Park. The Arpa is a river that passes through the district. It is a very shallow but can cause flooding during the rainy season.

== Economy ==
Bilaspur is the headquarters of South Eastern Coalfields, the largest and most profitable subsidiary of Coal India. The Bilaspur district also has the largest number of cement factories in the state, including manufacturers such as Lafarge, Century, and ACC etc. The Bilaspur railway zone has been fifth time in a row has been awarded as the most profitable railway zone by the Ministry of Railways this year. The district is also well connected to the rest of the country by means of rail and road network hence improving the economy of the city. The city's main commercial hub is Vyapar Vihar, Telipara, Link Road, Sepath Road, Bus Stand Road, Rajiv Plaza, and Goal Bazar. Bilaspur is also the Regional Headquarters of Chhattisgarh State Electricity Board, headed by Chief Engineer (BR). The Chief Engineer (BR) has jurisdiction of Bilaspur, Korba, Janjgir-Champa and Raigarh Districts for supply of electricity to all LT and HT consumers. After the regional headquarters in Raipur, the Bilaspur region has the second largest jurisdiction for supply of electricity in Chhattisgarh.

== Business travel and hotels ==
As an industrial city, Bilaspur also receives a large number of business travelers from within India and other countries, which requires the city to have good hotels. There are many hotels in Bilaspur, however the very first notable hotel and the only international brand hotel 'Courtyard by Marriott' opened in April 2014. The hotel is located near Mangla Chowk and is next to Citymall 36, a prominent shopping destination in the city. All Bilaspur's other hotels are locally run standalone units and although they do not offer high quality, they are relatively inexpensive.

== Transport ==
By AIR

Nearest Airport is Bilasa devi kevat Airport. 13 Km from Nehru Chok.

By Railway

Bilaspur has the zonal office of South East Central Railway, the 16th zone of Indian Railway which is recognized to have the maximum loading. The city is very well connected to rest of the country through good road and rail network. The city falls in the Mumbai Kolkata rail network. The Bilaspur railway station is the most important railway station in the state from where several trains for different parts of the country originate.

By Road

Bilaspur is second largest city of Chhattisgarh and connected through bus service to other major district of Chhattisgarh Bilaspur is also connected through bus service to other states like UP, Jharkhand, Bihar, MP, Odisha. The District Administration and Municipal Corporation of Bilaspur City are forming a joint venture, to operate world class City Bus services in Bilaspur City by the end of 2007. However autorickshaw rules the road.

== Demographics ==
Religions in Bilaspur district (2011)
Religion	Percent
Hinduism	94.94%
Islam	2.77%
Christianity	0.95%
Other (tribal religion)	0.49%
Other or not stated	0.85%

According to the 2011 census, Bilaspur district, Chhattisgarh has a population of 2,663,629, roughly equal to the nation of Kuwait or the US state of Nevada. This ranks it 152nd in India (out of a total of 640). The district has a population density of 322 inhabitants per square kilometre (830/sq mi). Its population growth rate over the decade 2001-2011 was 33.21%. Bilaspur has a sex ratio of 972 females for every 1000 males, and a literacy rate of 71.59%.

The divided district has a population of 1,625,502, of which 582,146 (35.81%) live in urban areas. The divided district has a sex ratio of 964 females per 1000 males. Scheduled Castes and Scheduled Tribes make up 20.76% and 14.43% of the population respectively.

=== Languages ===
Languages of Bilaspur district (2011)
1. Chhattisgarhi (79.5%)
2. Hindi (15.0%)
3. Sindhi (1.06%)
4. Others (4.45%)

At the time of the 2011 Census of India, 79.46% of the population in the district spoke Chhattisgarhi, 15.03% Hindi and 1.06% Sindhi as their first language.

== Tourism ==
This district has Achanakmar Wildlife Sanctuary.
