= National Highway 36 (India) =

National highway in India

National Highway 36
- Map of National Highway 36 in red

Route information
- Length: 334 km (208 mi)

Major junctions
- North end: NH 132 in Vikravandi
- List: NH 332 in Viluppuram; NH 532 in Vadalur; NH 81 in Meensurutty; NH 136B in Kumbakonam; NH 83 in Thanjavur; NH 336 in Pudukkottai; NH 536 in Tirumayam; NH 338 / NH 383 in Tiruppattur; NH 85 in Sivaganga
- South end: NH 87 in Manamadurai

Location
- Country: India
- States: Tamil Nadu
- Primary destinations: Panruti – Vadalur – Kumbakonam – Thanjavur – Pudukkottai – Thiruppathur – Sivaganga

Highway system
- Roads in India; Expressways; National; State; Asian
← NH 132	→ NH 87

Schematic map of National Highways in India

National Highway 36 (NH 36) is a National Highway in India that starts at Vikravandi and ends at Manamadurai. This highway runs entirely in the state of Tamil Nadu. It has a total length of 334 km.

The highway runs through Panruti, Vadalur Anaikkarai, Kumbakonam, Thanjavur, Pudukkottai, Thiruppathur and Sivagangai.

== Expansion ==
National Highway 36 (formerly NH 45C), the 164 km long Vikravandi - Kumbakonam - Thanjavur route, has been proposed to be upgraded to a four-laning road. Initially, the project was planned to be constructed as a four-lane road from Vikravandi to Meensurutti, and then as a 'two-lane road with paved shoulder' from Meensurutti to Thanjavur.

This project was implementing as three phase.

Si.No	Project	Length (K.m)
1	Thanjavur - Cholapuram	47.87
2	Cholapuram - Sethiathoppu	50.49
3	Sethiathoppu - vikravandi	65.96

On 06 April 2025, Prime Minister Narendra Modi dedicated to the nation the Thanjavur-Cholapuram four-laning highway, a part of National Highway 36.

== Advantage ==
- The delta region, which includes Villupuram, Cuddalore, Ariyalur, Thiruvarur and Thanjavur districts, is benefiting from the expansion of National Highway 36.
- Due to this expansion, the travel time between Kumbakonam - Thanjavur will be reduced from 75-90 minutes to 30 minutes, and it is expected that Kumbakonam - Trichy can be reached in 90 minutes.
- A bypass road has been constructed to avoid the demolition of the large number of residential structures located in the Panruti & Vadalur areas. The existing single-lane Kannithoppu Highway Bridge in Vadalur is being replaced with a new four-lane bridge, thus resolving the long-standing traffic problem over the weak bridge. This road will improve the transportation of agricultural products from the local area to nearby marketing centers.
