= National Highway 32 (India) =

National highway in India

National Highway 32
- Map of National Highway 32 in red

Route information
- Length: 657 km (408 mi)

Major junctions
- North end: NH 48 in Chennai
- List: NH 132B in Chengalpattu; NH 77 / NH 132 in Tindivanam; NH 332 / NH 332A in Puducherry; NH 532 in Cuddalore; NH 81 in Chidambaram; NH 136B in Sirkazhi; NH 83 in Nagapattinam; NH 85 in Thondi; NH 536 from Devipattinam to Ramanathapuram; NH 87 in Ramanathapuram; NH 38 / NH 138 in Thoothukudi
- South end: NH 44 in Anjugramam

Location
- Country: India
- States: Tamil Nadu, Puducherry
- Primary destinations: Tambaram, Perungalathur, Chengalpattu, Tindivanam, Puducherry, Cuddalore, Chidambaram, Sirkali, Akkur, Tharangambadi, Karaikal, Nagapattinam, Velankanni, Thiruthuraipoondi, Muthupet, Adirampattinam, Manamelkudi, Mimisal, Thondi, Devipattinam, Ramanathapuram, Thoothukudi, Tiruchendur, Uvari,Kanyakumari

Highway system
- Roads in India; Expressways; National; State; Asian
| ← NH 31 | → NH 33 |

National Highway 32 (NH 32) is a National Highway in India. It starts from Chennai and terminates at Kanyakumari. It is also known as East Coast Road.

== History ==
Originally, the highway terminated at Nagapattinam. The highway was extended up to Thoothukudi as per a notification issued by the Ministry of Road Transport and Highways on 5 December 2017. The highway was further extended up to Kanyakumari in July 2022.

On 6 April 2026, a portion of a bridge spanning the Kollidam River between Kollidam and Chidambaram, along the Villupuram–Nagapattinam (NH-32) in Tamil Nadu, subsided by approximately 20 ft (6.1 m). The incident was attributed to a failure in the bridge’s foundation.

== Route ==
The highway starting from its junction with NH-48 near Chennai connecting Chengalpattu, Tindivanam, Puducherry, Cuddalore, Chidambaram, Akkur, Karaikal, Nagapattinam, Velankanni, Thiruthuraipoondi, Muthupettai, Adirampattinam, Manamelkudi, Thondi, Devipattinam, Ramanathapuram bypass, Thiruppullani, Keelakarai, Ervadi, Valinokkam, Sayalgudi, Vembar, Vaippar, Kulathur, Veppalodai, Pattina, Maruthur, Thoothukudi, Mudivaithanendal, Tiruchendur, Kulasekharapatnam, Uvari, Kudankulam, Anjugramam and terminating at its junction with NH-44 near Karungulam .

== Four-laning ==
National Highway 32 is being developed as a four-lane highway in multiple contract packages, including the Puducherry–Nagapattinam, Nagapattinam–Thoothukudi and Thoothukudi–Tiruchendur-Kanyakumari stretches, as part of phased corridor development along the East Coast Road to improve freight movement and regional connectivity.

== Junctions list ==
Terminal at Chennai.

NH 48 near Chennai

NH 132B near Chengalpattu

NH 77 / NH 132 near Tindivanam

NH 332 / NH 332A near Puducherry

NH 532 near Cuddalore

NH 81 near Chidambaram

NH 136B near Sirkazhi

NH 83 near Nagapattinam

NH 85 near Thondi

NH 536 near Devipattinam and Ramanathapuram

NH 87 near Ramanathapuram

NH 38 / NH 138 near Thoothukudi

NH 44 near Anjugramam (Terminal)

== Interactive map ==
Schematic map of National Highways in India

Interactive map of NH-32 in red, spur routes in blue

== See also ==
- List of national highways in India
- List of national highways in India by state
