= National Highway 83 (India) =

National highway in India

National Highway 83
- Map of the National Highway in red
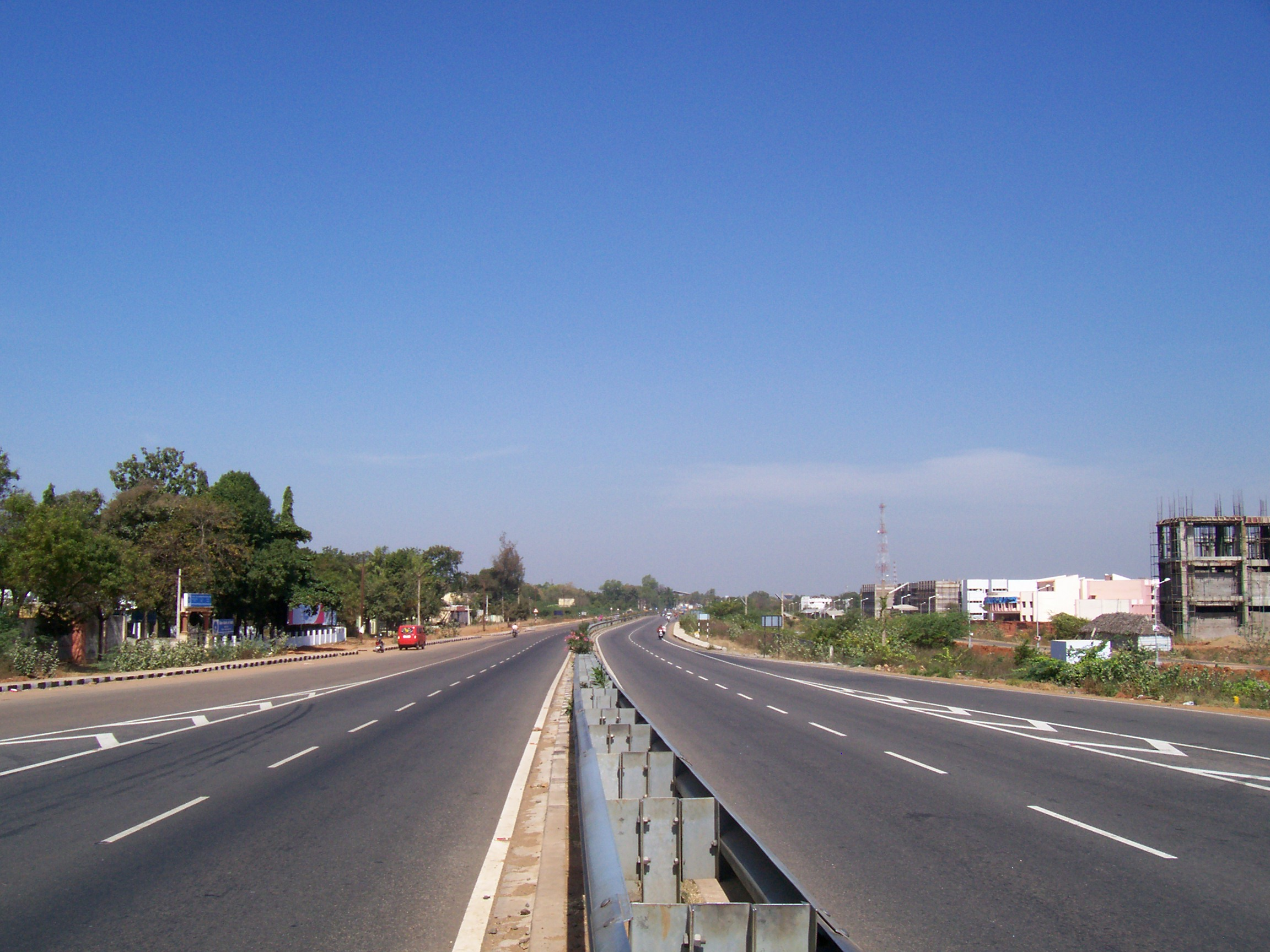
- NH 83 near NIT Trichy

Route information
- Part of AH43
- Length: 389 km (242 mi)

Major junctions
- West end: NH 544 / NH 948 in Coimbatore
- List: NH 381 in Oddanchatram; NH 44 / NH 183 / NH 383 / AH43 in Dindigul; NH 38 / NH 336 in Tiruchirappalli; NH 36 in Thanjavur
- East end: NH 32 in Nagapattinam

Location
- Country: India
- States: TN
- Primary destinations: Dindigul, Oddanchatram, Palani, Pollachi, Udumalpet, Madathukulam, , Tiruchirappalli, Thanjavur, Thiruvarur

Highway system
- Roads in India; Expressways; National; State; Asian
← NH 81	→ NH 85

National Highway 83 (NH 83) is a primary national highway in India. NH-83 runs in an east-west direction, entirely within the state of Tamil Nadu in India. 4-laning of Pollachi to Dindigul stretch was approved in 2018.

The stretch between Thanjavur, Thiruvarur and Nagapattinam is being upgraded into Two lane with paved shoulders.

== Route ==
Schematic map of National Highways in India

NH83 connects Coimbatore, Pollachi, Udumalpet, Palani, Oddanchatram, Dindigul, Tiruchirappalli, Thanjavur, Needamangalam, Thiruvarur and Nagapattinam in the state of Tamil Nadu.

== See also ==
- List of national highways in India
- List of national highways in India by state
