= Kalathur =

- Village
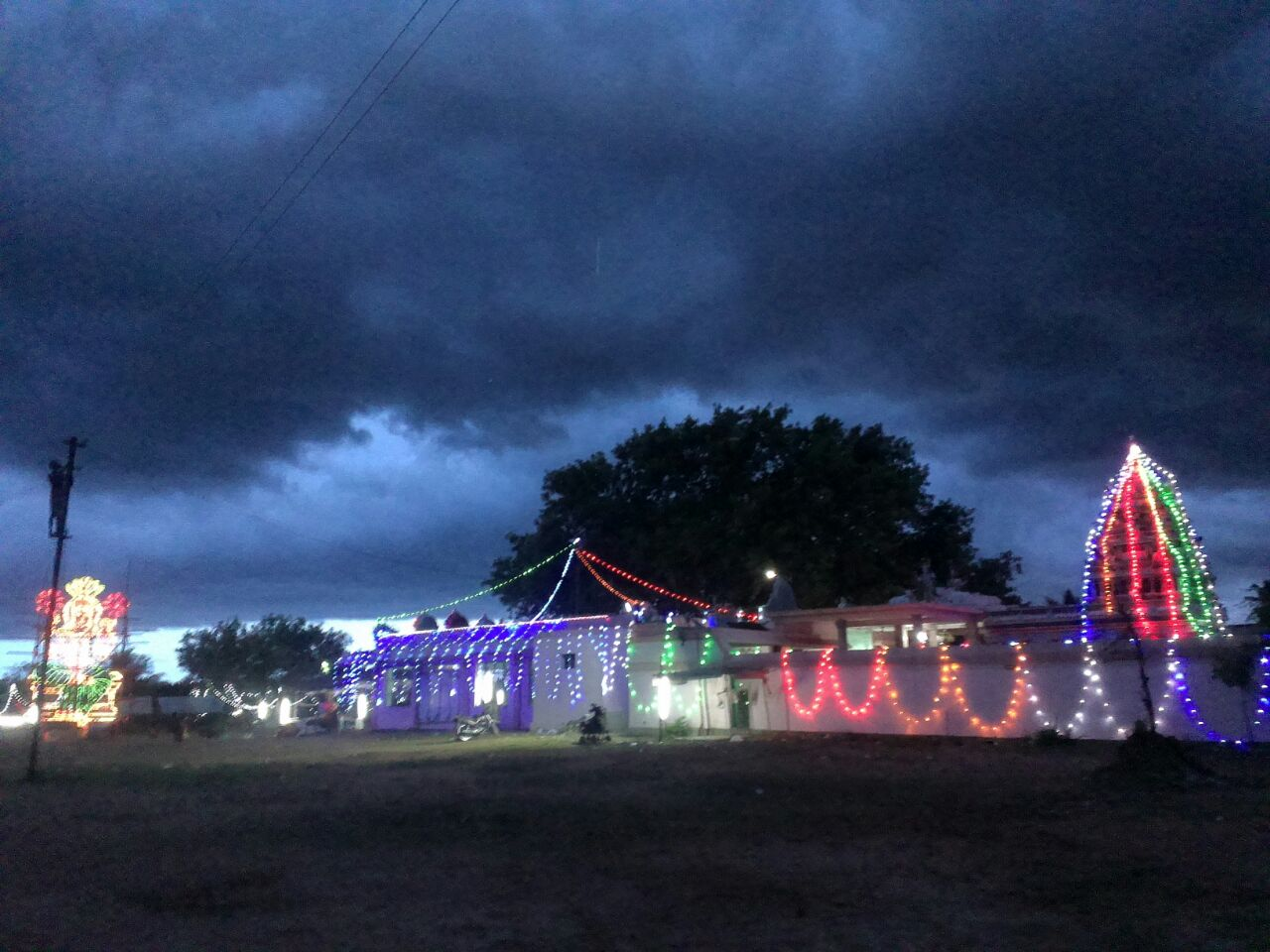
- Arulmigu Shri Muthumariaman Temple, Kalathur

- Location in Tamil Nadu, India
- Coordinates: 10.33°N 79.20°E
- Country: India
- State: Tamil Nadu
- Region: Chola Nadu
- District: Thanjavur
- Zone: Central

Government
  - Type: Village Panchayat
  - Body: Kalathur Panchayat
- Elevation: 34 m (112 ft)

Population (2011)
  - Total: 6,424
- Demonym: Thevar(Agamudaiyar)
- Time zone: UTC+5:30 (IST)
- PIN: 614804 (Peravurani Post office)
- Telephone code: +91 4373 (Thanjavur)
- Vehicle registration: TN 49 (Thanjavur R.T.O)

Kalathur is a panchayat village in Peravurani panchayat Union of Thanjavur district in the Indian state of Tamil Nadu. Kalathur is a part of the Pattukkottai taluk of Thanjavur district and located 67 kilometres (42 mi) south of Thanjavur connected via State Highway 29.

Kalathur comes under the Peravurani assembly constituency which elects a member to the Tamil Nadu Legislative Assembly once every five years and it is a part of the Thanjavur (Lok Sabha constituency) which elects its member of parliament (MP) once in five years.

== Geography ==
It has an average elevation of 34 m (112 ft) and is located in the southeast part of the Thanjavur District 15 km from the Coromandel coast.

- It is a part of the Pattukottai taluk.
- It is surrounded by Thiruchitrambalam Panchayat in the north, Seruvaviduthi Panchayat in the west and north west, Kalluranikadu to the east, Palayanagaram and Ammayandi Panchayats in the south.

== Economy ==
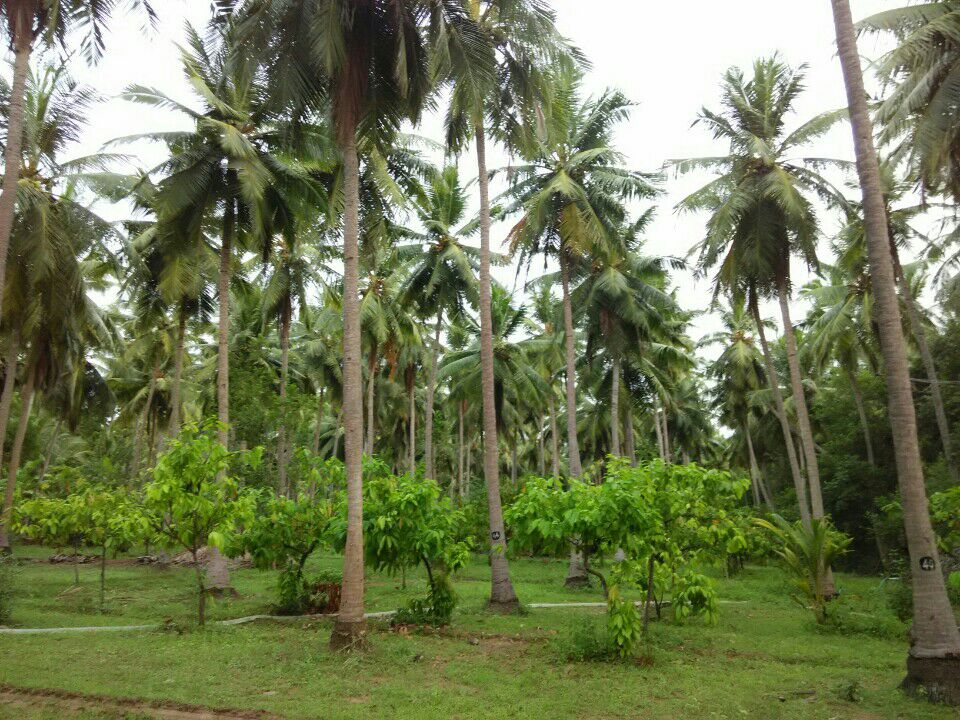
Coconut plantation in Kalathur

The village is a part of the fertile Cauvery delta region, and agriculture is the principal occupation of the people of Kalathur. Cultivated crops include coconut, Paddy, cotton, sugarcane, bananas, cocoa and paddy cultivation is practised extensively.

Cattle rearing is also a major livelihood of kalathur peoples.

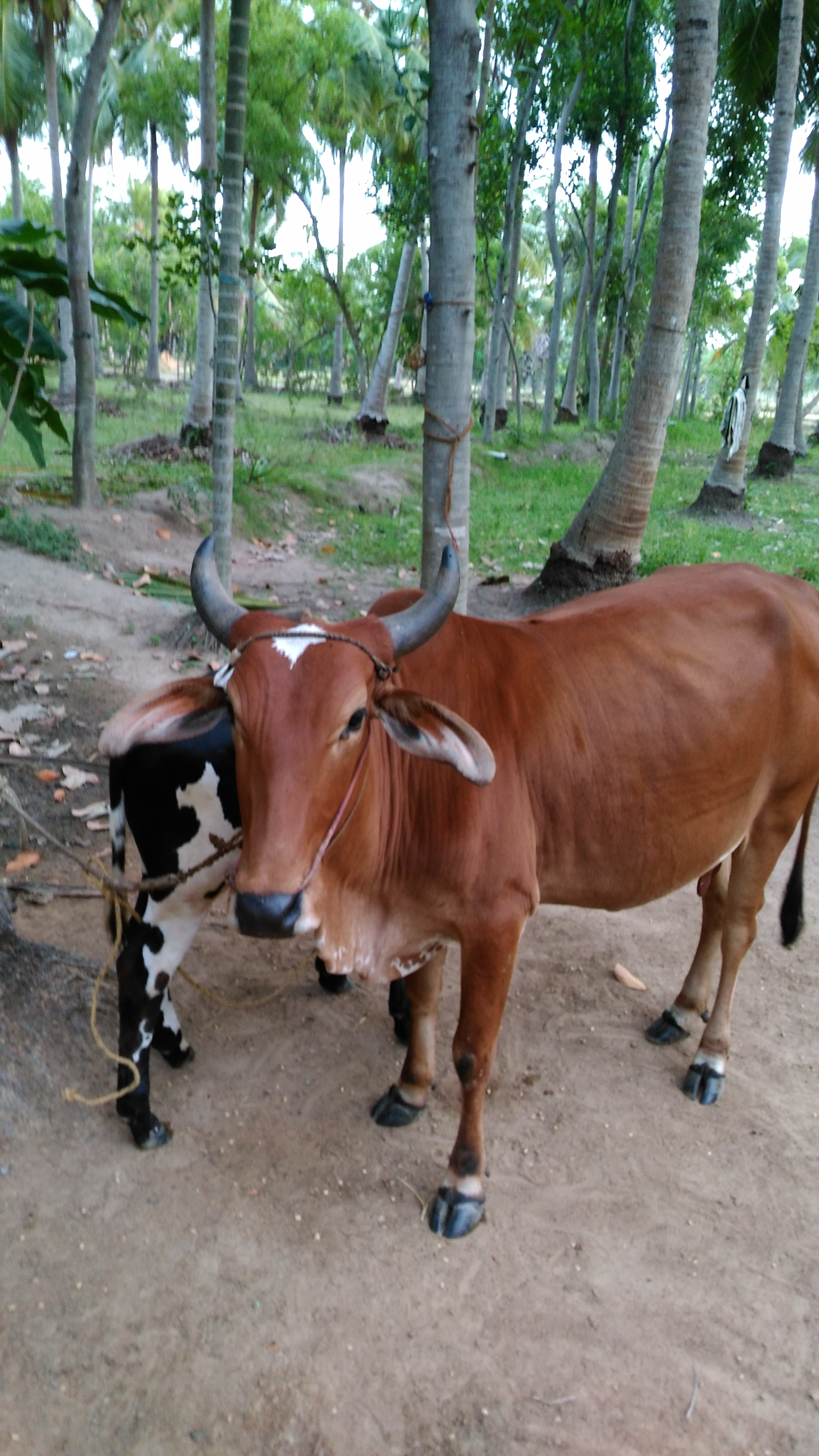
Cattle in kalathur

Kalathur and its neighbouring villages are known for their coconut plantations. Coconuts produced there are very pulpy and tasty compared to Pollachi coconut which has more water. Coconut-based industries can be found here such as coconut oil mills, coir industries etc.

== Administration ==
The Kalathur Panchayat comprises Kalathur East, Kalathur West, Nadangaadu, Pokkanviduthi and Sithukkadu villages and is currently being administered by the Village president, elected once in five years.

== Demographics ==
As of the 2011 Census of India, the village comprises 1576 families residing with a population of 6,424 of which 3190 are males while 3234 are females. The average literacy rate of the village was 79.09%, compared to the national average of 72.99%.

== Irrigation ==
- The village is irrigated with the help Kallanai Kaalvaai (The grand anaicut canal).
- Lakes are also used extensively for irrigation.
- The grand anaicut canal carries the water of river Cauvery to this village.
- It is also irrigated by lakes, ponds and tanks.
- In the recent years after the arrival of borewells mostly the same is used for irrigation.

== Transportation ==
The state highways SH29 and Major District road 829 pass through Kalathur. There are regular buses to Pattukkottai and Peravurani and mini-buses connecting with Peravurani and Thiruchitrabalam.

The nearest railway station is Peravurani railway station, located 8 kilometres (5.0 mi) away. The stations at Thanjavur, which is 67 kilometres (42 mi) away, and Tiruchirappalli, 103 kilometres (64 mi) away, offer more services.

The nearest airport is Tiruchirapalli International Airport. which is 97 kilometres (60 mi) away.

== Temples ==
- Sri Muthumariamman Temple
- Sri Balamurugan Temple
- Sri Narayaniamman Temple
- Sri Ayyanar Temple
- Sri Pattavar Temple
- Sri Sannaasi Ayya Temple
- Sri Agni Kaliamman Temple.

== Schools ==
- Government Primary School - Kalathur
- Government High School - Kalathur
- Government Primary School - Sithukkadu,
- Gover High School - Sithukkadu,
- Kalaivani Nursery and Primary School - Sithu jaffna
