= Nadankkadu =

Nadangadu
- Village
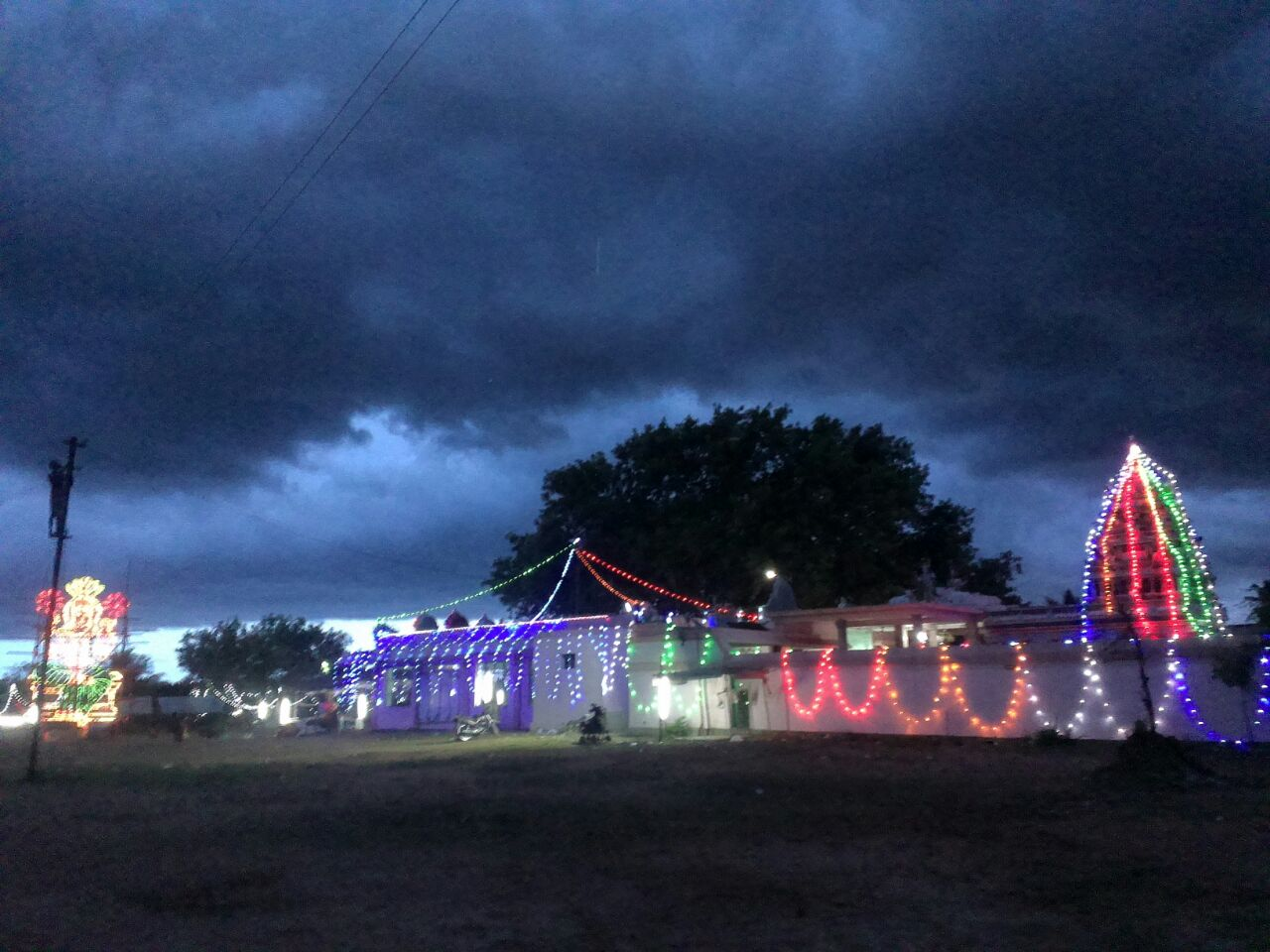
- Shri Muthumaariamman temple kalathur

- Location in Tamil Nadu, India
- Coordinates: 10.33°N 79.20°E
- Country: India
- State: Tamil Nadu
- Region: Chola Nadu
- District: Thanjavur
- Zone: Central

Government
  - Type: Village Panchayat
  - Body: Kalathur Panchayat
- Elevation: 34 m (112 ft)

Population (2011)
  - Total: 6,424
- Demonym(s): Kallar, Thevar
- Time zone: UTC+5:30 (IST)
- PIN: 614804
- Telephone code: +91 4373
- Vehicle registration: TN 49

Nadangadu is a village in Kalathur panchayat in Thanjavur district in the state of Tamil Nadu.
