= National Highway 338 (India) =

National Highway in India

National Highway 338
- Map of National Highway 338 in red

Route information
- Auxiliary route of NH 38
- Length: 34 km (21 mi)

Major junctions
- West end: Melur
- East end: Tiruppathur

Location
- Country: India
- States: Tamil Nadu

Highway system
- Roads in India; Expressways; National; State; Asian
← NH 38	→ NH 36

National Highway 338, commonly referred to as NH 338 is a national highway in India. It is a secondary route of National Highway 38. NH-338 runs in the state of Tamil Nadu in India.

== Route ==
NH338 connects Melur and Tiruppathur in the state of Tamil Nadu.

== Junctions ==
NH 38 Terminal near Melur.
NH 36 Terminal near Tiruppathur.

== See also ==
- List of national highways in India
- List of national highways in India by state
