= National Highway 383 (India) =

National Highway in India

National Highway 383
- Map of the National Highway in red

Route information
- Length: 105 km (65 mi)

Major junctions
- West end: Dindigul
- East end: Karaikudi

Location
- Country: India
- States: Tamil Nadu

Highway system
- Roads in India; Expressways; National; State; Asian
← NH 83	→ NH 536

National Highway 383, commonly called NH 383 is a national highway in India. It is a spur road of National Highway 83. NH-383 traverses the state of Tamil Nadu in India. The route of national highway has been extended from Kottampatty to Karaikudi.

== Route ==
Dindigul, Kosavapatti, Sanarpatti, Gopalpatti, Natham, Samuthirapatti, Kottampatty, Tiruppathur, Karaikkudi.

== Junctions ==
NH 83 Terminal near Dindigul.
NH 785 near Natham.
NH 38 near Kottampatty.
NH 536 Terminal near Karaikudi.

== See also ==
- List of national highways in India
- List of national highways in India by state
