= NH 132 =

NH 132 may refer to:

- National Highway 132 (India)
- New Hampshire Route 132, United States
