= National Highway 87 (India) =

National highway in India

National Highway 87
- Map of the National Highway in red

Route information
- Part of AH43
- Maintained by NHAI
- Length: 174 km (108 mi)

Major junctions
- West end: NH 85 in Tiruppuvanam
- NH 36 in Manamadurai; NH 32 / NH 536 in Ramanathapuram
- East end: Dhanushkodi

Location
- Country: India
- States: Tamil Nadu
- Primary destinations: Madurai - Paramakudi -Ramanathapuram- Rameswaram - Dhanushkodi

Highway system
- Roads in India; Expressways; National; State; Asian
← NH 785	→ NH 1

National Highway 87 (or NH 87) is a National Highway in southern India. It crosses the Pamban Bridge (Annai Indira Gandhi Bridge) before entering into Pamban Island. The total length runs up to 154 km (96 mi). The 5 km road between Mukundarayar Chathiram and Dhanuskodi was destroyed during the 1964 cyclone. Then the Government of India has started construction of the new stretch of road on 2015 and opened to vehicles with some restrictions on Feb'2017 at a cost of ₹ 250 million. At the same time, the road between Madurai and Rameswaram was converted from a two lane road to a four-lane highway. Then Union minister for road transport and shipping Shri.Nitin Gadkari laid the foundation stone for the Rs 1,387-crore project in Madurai on 17 July 2015. An initial outlay of Rs 927 crore was made {May 2019} and the project has been sanctioned for Rs 1,387 crore. Then the first 75km stretch from Madurai to Paramakudi was proposed to be converted into a proper four-lane road which is a Green Highway, while the remaining 39km stretch from Paramakudi to Ramanathapuram was widened as a two-lane road with paved shoulders. This road includes bypass from Madurai (Viraganoor Ring road) to Manalur which is a newly constructed route skipping the old route(which runs through Puliyankulam and Silaiman), and has bypasses at several places like Thiruppuvanam, Thiruppachethi, Rajagambiram, Paramakudi (a 9.4-km-long stretch connecting Thelichathanallur and Vendhoni(near kalayur)) and Ramanathapuram (a nine-km-long bypass connecting Achunthanvayal and East Coast Road near Devipattinam) which would substantially ease traffic congestion in these towns and also saves time for those tourists who are going to Rameswaram. Falling under the Old NH 49 and AH 43, this project is one of the largest completed green corridor in Tamil Nadu by the National Highways Authority of India in the recent times.

== Route ==
NH 85 via Tiruppuvanam, Thiruppachethi, Manamadurai, Paramakudi, Ramanathapuram, Rameswaram, Dhanushkodi.

== Expansion ==
The Union Cabinet on July 1, 2025 approved the construction of a 46.7 km long 4-lane highway on National Highway 87 (NH 87) between Paramakudi and Ramanathapuram in Tamil Nadu. The project, estimated at ₹1,853 crore, will be developed under Hybrid Annual Mode (HAM).

This part of NH 87 was upgraded to a two-lane road with paved shoulder in 2015.

== See also ==
- List of national highways in India
- National Highways Development Project
