= National Highway 132B (India) =

National Highway in India

National Highway 132B
- Map of National Highway 132B in red

Route information
- Auxiliary route of NH 32
- Length: 40 km (25 mi)

Major junctions
- East end: Chengalpattu
- West end: Kanchipuram

Location
- Country: India
- States: Tamil Nadu

Highway system
- Roads in India; Expressways; National; State; Asian
← NH 32	→ NH 48

National Highway 132B, commonly referred to as NH 132B is a national highway in India. It is a secondary route of National Highway 32. NH-132B runs in the state of Tamil Nadu in India.

== Route ==
NH132B connects Chengalpattu and Kanchipuram in the state of Tamil Nadu.

== Junctions ==
NH 32 Terminal near Chengalpattu.
NH 48 Terminal near Kanchipuram.

== See also ==
- List of national highways in India
- List of national highways in India by state
