= National Highway 785 (India) =

National Highway in India

National Highway 785
- Map of National Highway 785 in red

Route information
- Auxiliary route of NH 85
- Length: 65 km (40 mi)

Major junctions
- South end: Madurai
- North end: Tovarankurichchi

Location
- Country: India
- States: Tamil Nadu

Highway system
- Roads in India; Expressways; National; State; Asian
← NH 85	→ NH 38

National Highway 785, commonly referred to as NH 785 is a national highway in India. It is a spur road of National Highway 85. NH-785 traverses the state of Tamil Nadu in India.

== Route ==
NH785 connects Madurai, Naganagulam, Iyyar Bungalow,Thiruppalai Oomachikulam, Vembarali, Vathipatti, Chatthirapatti, Chinnapatti, Nattam and Tovarankurichchi.

== Junctions ==
NH 85 Terminal near Madurai.
NH 383 near Natham
NH 38 Terminal near Tovarankurichchi.

== See also ==
- List of national highways in India
- List of national highways in India by state
