= Kalathur East =

- Village
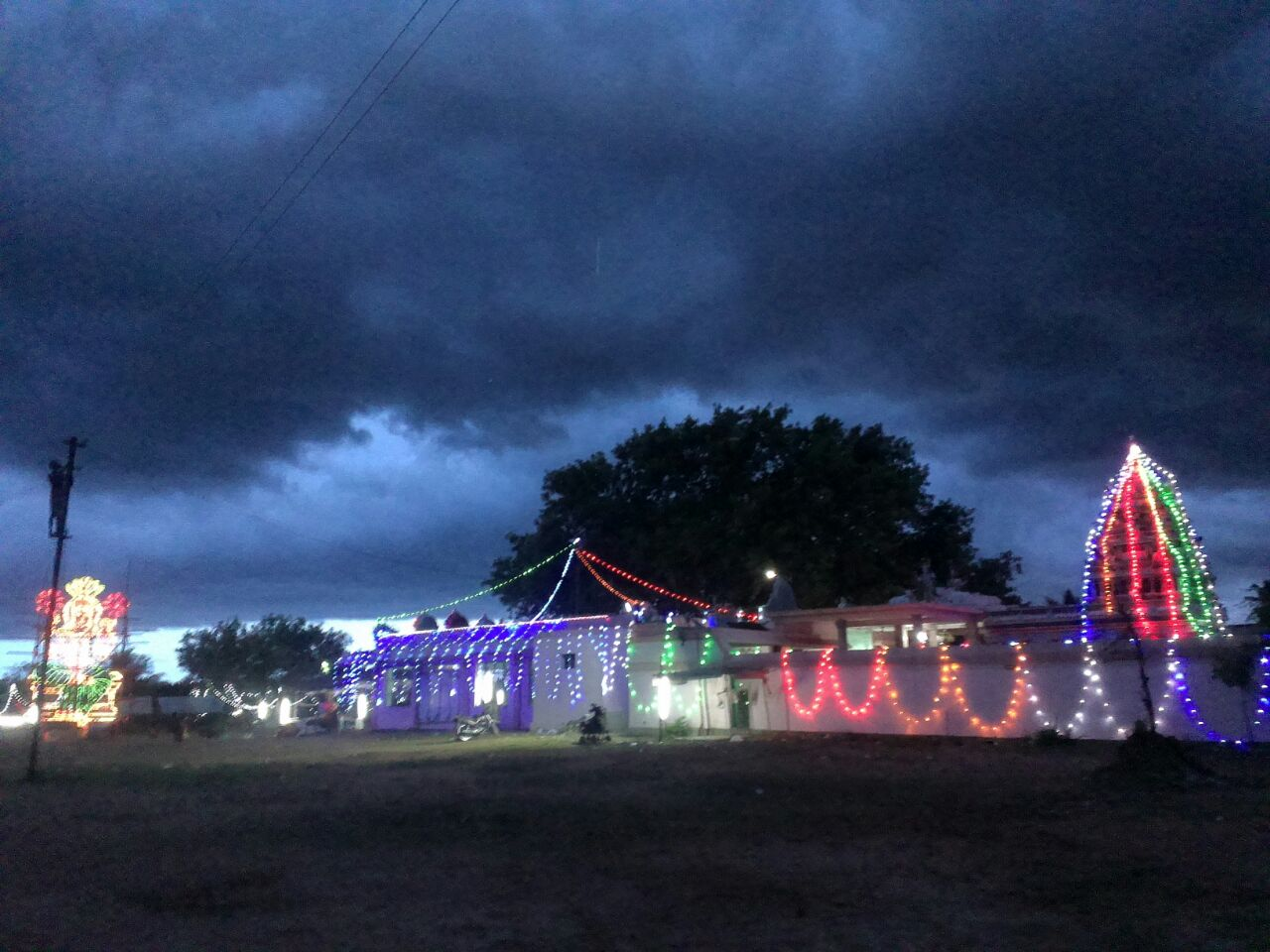
- Shri Muthumaariamman temple kalathur

- Location in Tamil Nadu, India
- Coordinates: 10.33°N 79.20°E
- Country: India
- State: Tamil Nadu
- Region: Chola Nadu
- District: Thanjavur
- Zone: Central

Government
  - Type: Village Panchayat
  - Body: Kalathur Panchayat
- Elevation: 34 m (112 ft)

Population (2011)
  - Total: 6,424
- Demonym: பறையர்
- Time zone: UTC+5:30 (IST)
- PIN: 614804
- Telephone code: +91 4373
- Vehicle registration: TN 49

Kalathur East is a village in Kalathur panchayat in Thanjavur district in the state of Tamil Nadu, in southeastern India. Kalathur East is located at 10.33°N 79.20°E.
