= National Highway 336 (India) =

National highway in India

National Highway 336
- Map of National Highway 336 in red

Route information
- Length: 52 km (32 mi)

Major junctions
- From: Pudukkottai
- To: Tiruchirappalli

Location
- Country: India
- Primary destinations: Keeranur

Highway system
- Roads in India; Expressways; National; State; Asian
← NH 36	→ NH 83

National Highway 336 (NH 336) is a National Highway which runs for 52 km completely in the state of Tamil Nadu, India. It is part of the old National Highway 210. The Road splits off from NH-36 at junction on the outskirts of Pudukkottai till Trichy where Keeranur being major town in-between. Many important places exists along the route like Bharathidasan University, Anna University Trichy, Indian Institute of Management Tiruchirappalli, and Trichy Airport.
