= National Highway 332A (India) =

National Highway in India

National Highway 332A
- Map of National Highway 332A in red

Route information
- Auxiliary route of NH 32
- Length: 92.2 km (57.3 mi)

Major junctions
- South end: Puducherry
- North end: Mamallapuram

Location
- Country: India
- States: Tamil Nadu

Highway system
- Roads in India; Expressways; National; State; Asian
← NH 32	→ NH 332A

National Highway 332A, commonly referred to as NH 332A is a national highway in India. It is a secondary route of National Highway 32. NH-332A runs in the state of Tamil Nadu in India.

== Route ==
NH332A connects Puducherry and Mamallapuram in the state of Tamil Nadu.

== Junctions ==
NH 32 Terminal near Puducherry.

== See also ==
- List of national highways in India
- List of national highways in India by state
