= Kochi–Theni Greenfield Highway =

Proposed greenfield highway in India

- കൊച്ചി–തേനി ഗ്രീൻഫീൽഡ് ഹൈവേ

Route information
- Maintained by NHAI
- Length: 151 km (94 mi)

Major junctions
- West end: Kundannoor, Kochi, Kerala, India
- East end: Theni, Tamil Nadu

Location
- Country: India
- Districts: Ernakulam, Idukki, Theni
- Major cities: Kochi

Highway system
- Roads in India; Expressways; National; State; Asian

The Kochi–Theni Greenfield Highway is a 151 kilometre-long planned greenfield controlled-access highway in India, connecting Kochi in Kerala with Theni in Tamil Nadu. The new six lane highway is part of the Kochi - Tuticorin economic corridor which aims at connecting these two major ports enabling smooth movement of cargo between the two. The highway, which will pass through the Western Ghats of Idukki district, will begin from Kundannoor in Kochi and reach Theni almost 67 kilometres lesser than the existing NH 85 alignment and is expected to decongest the 121-km Kochi–Munnar NH 85 stretch.

== Overview ==
The new six lane highway will begin from the south side of Kundannoor in Ernakulam district. From here, it will pass through the Muvatupuzha and Nedumkandam regions, passing through the proposed Angamaly–Kundannoor Bypass, turning east near Puthankurish. With the completion of this new highway, it is expected that the traffic on National Highway 85 through Munnar will reduce significantly. The cargo movement between Cochin Port and Tamil Nadu is also expected to become more easier.

The highway will be constructed by avoiding residential areas and congested towns as much as possible with minimum curves and climbs. The distance between Kochi and Theni will be reduced by 70-90 km than the existing NH 85 route.

== See also ==
- National Highway 85 (India)
