= National Highway 136B (India) =

National Highway in India

National Highway 136B
- Map of National Highway 136B in red

Route information
- Auxiliary route of NH 36
- Length: 52 km (32 mi)

Major junctions
- West end: Kumbakonam
- Mayiladuthurai
- East end: Sirkazhi

Location
- Country: India
- States: Tamil Nadu

Highway system
- Roads in India; Expressways; National; State; Asian
← NH 36	→ NH 32

National Highway 136B, commonly referred to as NH 136B is a national highway in India. It is a secondary route of National Highway 36. NH-136B runs in the state of Tamil Nadu in India.

== Route ==
NH136B runs through Mayiladuthurai and originates from Kumbakonam Near NH-36 and ends at Sirkazhi NH-32 in the state of Tamil Nadu.

== Junctions ==
NH 36 Terminal near Kumbakonam.
NH 32 Terminal near Sirkazhi.

== See also ==
- List of national highways in India
- List of national highways in India by state
