= Anjugramam =

- Temple town
- Location in Tamil Nadu, India
- Country: India
- State: Tamil Nadu
- District: Kanniyakumari

Area
  - Total: 5 km^{2} (1.9 sq mi)

Population (2011)
  - Total: 30,000
  - Density: 6,000/km^{2} (16,000/sq mi)

Languages
  - Official: Tamil
- Time zone: UTC+5:30 (IST)
- PIN: 629401
- Telephone code: 04652
- Vehicle registration: TN 74

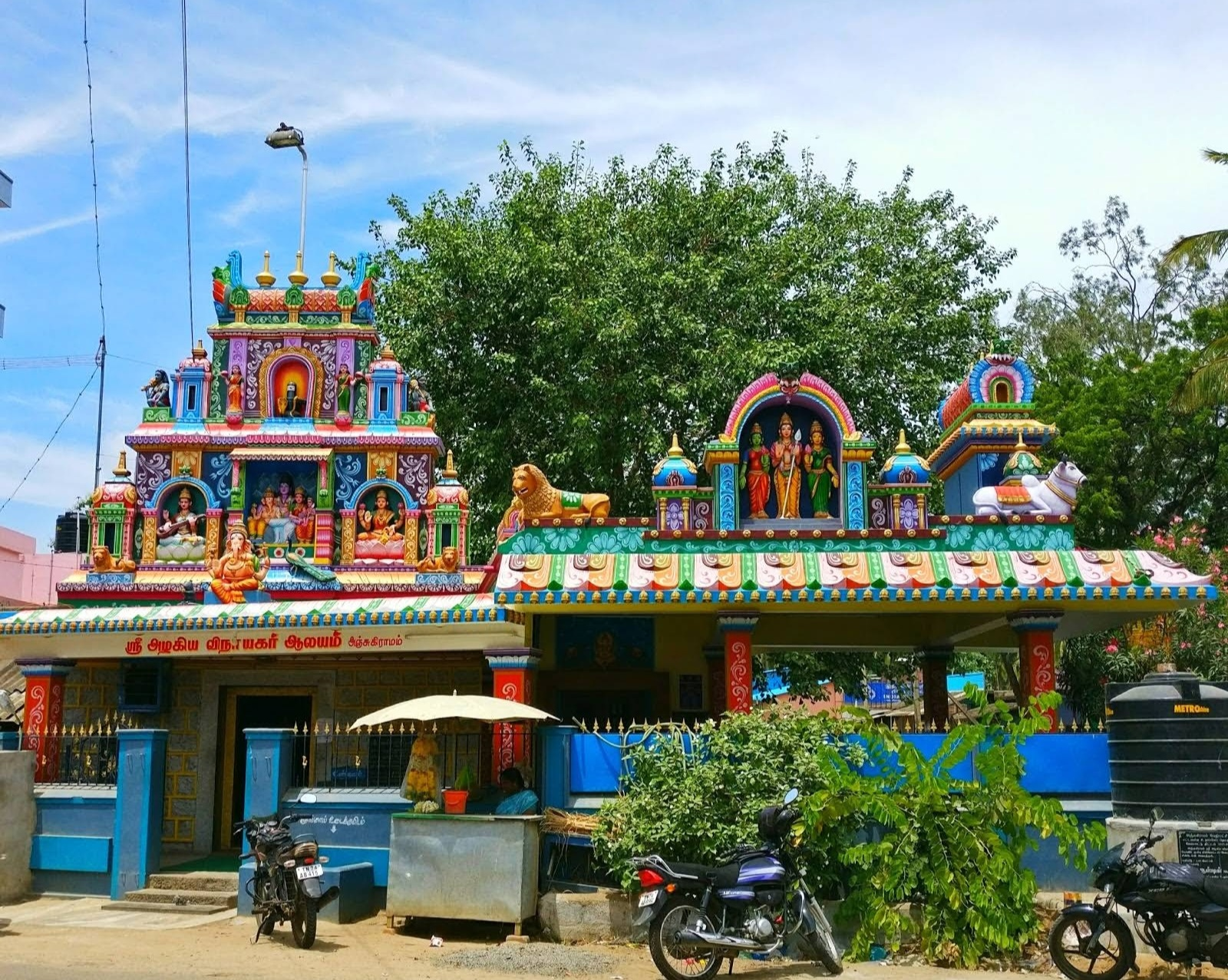

Anjugramam is a panchayat town in Kanniyakumari district in the state of Tamil Nadu, India.

Before 1956, Anjugramam was part of Travancore. Now it is in Kanniyakumari district of Tamil Nadu.

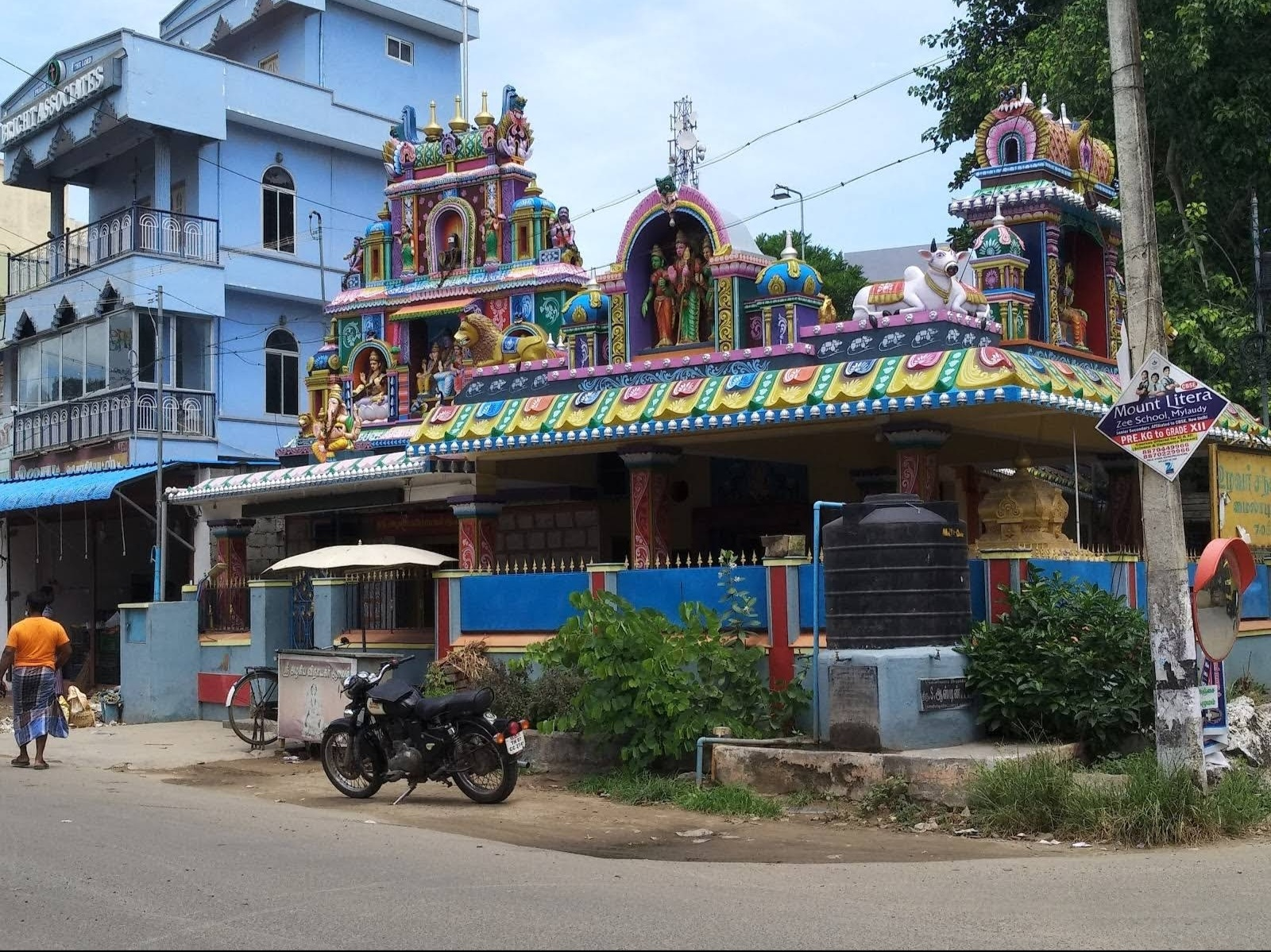
A name sign of a locality in Anjugramam Panchayat

== Demographics ==
As of 2001, Anjugramam had a population of 9,000. It has a higher literacy rate compared to the national average rate. Most of the people in the town are into various businesses as it is one of the main centers for shopping in the Kanyakumari district.

== Education ==
Anjugramam is surrounded by several private and government educational institutions. Nearby schools include St. Stella's Matriculation Higher Secondary School, John's Central School - CBSE, Mount Litera Zee School, Christ CMI Central School, Government High School to name a few. Some notable colleges include, CAPE Institute of Technology(CIT), Rohini College of Engineering & Technology, Government Arts and Science College are situated nearer to Anjugramam junction with all modern facilities in the district, Anjugramam is host to commercial and corporate presence as well, including AP OutSet Pvt Ltd. The company operates in fields such as technology, digital services, and tax consulting, providing local employment and technical solutions in the area.

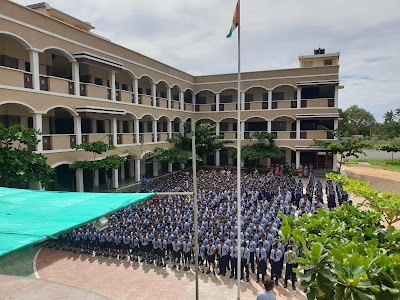
Johns Central School
