= Sithukkadu =

Village in Tamil Nadu, India

Sithukkadu is a village in Thanjavur district, Tamil Nadu, India.
