= Cholapuram =

Panchayat town in Tamil Nadu, India

Cholapuram Sholapuram
- Village
- Cholapuram
- Nickname: Temple Town or City of Temples
- Location in Tamil Nadu, India
- Coordinates: 11°3′5″N 79°24′55″E
- Country: India
- Tamilnadu: Tamil Nadu
- Thanjavur of India|District]]: [ Thanjavur district
- Established: 09. 07. 2018
- Elevation: 123 m (404 ft)

Population (2001)
  - Total: 6,364
- Demonym: Tamilian

Tamil, English
  - Official: Tamil
- Time zone: UTC+5:30 (IST)
- PIN code: 612503
- Telephone code _ 0435: 0435
- Vehicle registration: TN 68

Cholapuram is a panchayat town in the Thanjavur district of the state of Tamil Nadu, India.In ancient time, it's called as Bhairavapuram.

== Population ==
According to the 2001 Indian population census, the population of Cholapuram was 6,364, of which women constituted 52%. Cholapuram's literacy rate stood at 79%, which is higher than the national average of 59.9%. The male literacy rate was 79%, compared to the female literacy rate of 66%. Cholapuram also has a substantially large number of people under the age of six: according to the census that year this number stood at 12% of the population. Majority of its residents are Muslims, Dalits and Hindus are also scattered living in its surroundings. Three big mosques and Temples are religious identification.

== Agriculture ==
The income of Cholapuram's residents is heavily dependent upon agriculture, trading and the welding works. The major crops cultivated in are paddy (rice), pulses, gingelly, groundnut and sugarcane. Minor crops like maize, soybeans, and red gram vegetables, cotton, casuarina trees (savukku), fruits, chili, banana trees, ginger, groundnut, and pulses are also grown.

== Education ==
Schools and colleges in Cholapuram include:

- Cholapuram Government High School
- Jayam Middle School
- Cholapuram Government School (From 1st - 5th Standard)
- Sri Venkateshwara Matriculation School
- Morning Star Matriculation School -Cholapuram Kumbakonam
- Annai College Of Arts and Science, Kallapuliyur Village Kumbakonam Thanjavur
- SKSS Arts College, Thirupanandal Kumbakonam Thanjavur
- Mass College Of Arts & Science, Kallapuliyur Village Kumbakonam Thanjavur
- Arasu Engineering and Polytechnic College, Kallapuliyur Village Kumbakonam Thanjavur.

== Business ==
Major business in Cholapuram include the Indian Bank, Indian Overseas Bank and The City Union Bank. The Cholapuram area is popular for welding works. There are number of general merchant stores, medicals, fertilizer shops, fancy stores, meat stall, super market, Restaurants, Cabs, Travels and Sweet Stalls are doing business. It is predominantly agriculture based. A sizable population of people took up jobs in Singapore, Malaysia and Brunei. As the opportunities in these countries diminished, educated younger generation opted for lucrative jobs in Arab countries of the Persian Gulf (Dubai, Qatar, Bahrain, Kuwait and Saudi Arabia) and few of them in England and United States of America, most probability every household in the village has at least one person in the Persian Gulf (Middle East Countries).

== Transportation ==
The National highway NH 36, connects Vikravandi and Manamadurai passes through Cholapuram. The Kumbakonam railway station is the nearest to Cholapuram. The main bus terminal in Kumbakonam, provides inner and outer area transportation. Cholapuram is served by town buses from Kumbakonam. Cholapuram is located at the distance of 270 km from Chennai and 13 km from Kumbakonam and the nearest airport is in Trichy at 90 km.
