= Tiruchirappalli International Airport =

Airport serving Tiruchirapalli, Tamil Nadu, India

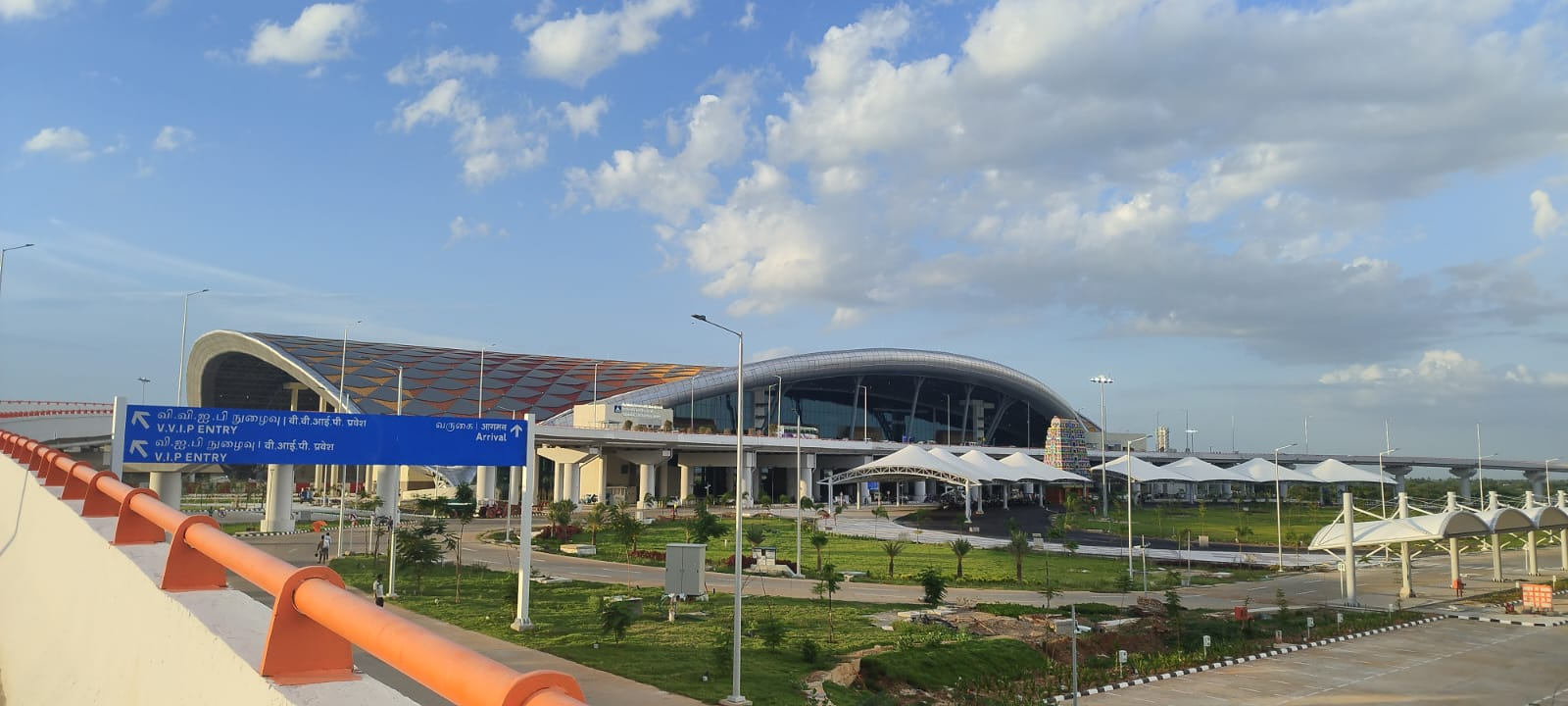
- IATA: TRZ; ICAO: VOTR

Summary
- Airport type: Public
- Owner: Ministry of Civil Aviation
- Operator: Airports Authority of India
- Serves: Tiruchirapalli
- Location: Tiruchirappalli, Tamil Nadu, India
- Opened: 23 December 1936; 89 years ago
- Operating base for: Air India Express
- Elevation AMSL: 87.7 m (288 ft)
- Coordinates: 10°45′56″N 078°42′54″E
- Website: www.aai.aero/en/airports/tiruchirapalli

Map
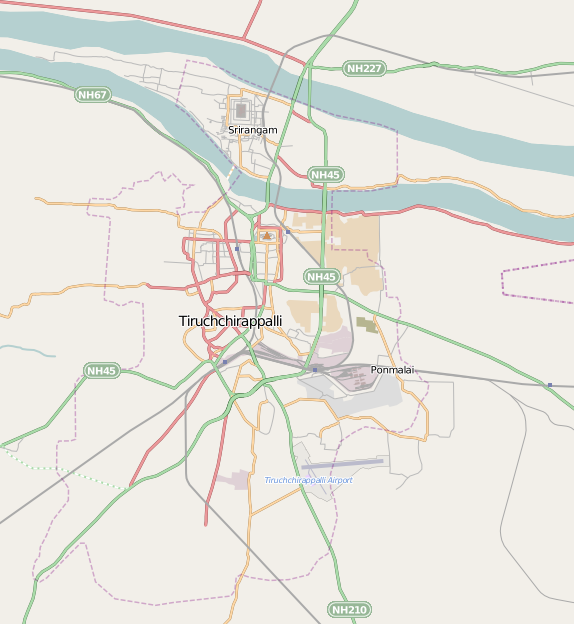
- Location within Tiruchirapalli Location within Tamil Nadu Location within India

Runways
Direction	Length		Surface
Direction	m	ft	Surface
09/27	2,480	8,136	Asphalt

Statistics (April 2025 - March 2026)
- Passengers: 22,21,024 (▲13.5%)
- Aircraft movements: 18,858 (▲8.4%)
- Cargo tonnage: 7,186.7 (▲11%)
- Source: Airports Authority of India

Tiruchirappalli International Airport (IATA: TRZ, ICAO: VOTR) is an international airport serving the city of Tiruchirappalli in the Indian state of Tamil Nadu. Spread across an area of 702.02 acres (284.10 ha), the airport is located off the National Highway 336, about 5 km (3.1 mi) south of the city center. As of 2025, it is the second-busiest airport in the state by international passenger traffic only after the Chennai International Airport, and the third-busiest in terms of passengers served, after Chennai and Coimbatore International Airports.

The airport is managed by the Airports Authority of India and is served by two Indian and four foreign airlines, providing direct connections to five domestic and nine international locations. The airport was designated as an international airport in October 2012 and holds an ISO 9001:2008 certification. In March 2023, the airport was awarded as the Best Airport in Asia-Pacific in the under two million passengers per annum category by Airports Council International.

The first flight service began in 1936 with regular airmail flights operating from 1938. It was used as an airbase by the Royal Air Force during the Second World War. After the Indian Independence, the airport was used for civilian operations. In the 1990s, the airport had regular commercial flights to the Middle East and Sri Lanka. In the late 2000s, it expanded as an international hub for low cost carriers plying to South East Asia. A new passenger terminal was added in 2009, and the airport was further expanded and renovated in the early 2020s with the addition of a new passenger terminal, parking bays, and Air Traffic Control tower.

== History ==
=== Beginning and establishment ===
The first flight landed at the airport on 23 December 1936 when Tata Sons operated an airmail service between Madras and Colombo via Tiruchirappalli. The flight was operated by a Miles M4A Merlin aircraft (registration VT-AHC), and was piloted by Homi Dhanjishaw Bharucha. A weekly airmail operated on the Bombay–Tiruchirappalli route, with various stopovers, during early 1937 which later made connection to the Colombo service at Tiruchirappalli. The regular airmail service on the Madras–Colombo route began on 28 February 1938. During the early years, the airfield consisted of a 600 m (2,000 ft) runway and an Air traffic control tower.

=== Second World War ===
During the Second World War, RAF station Kajamalai was established at the airfield by the British Royal Air Force. The aircraft landed in the airfield for carrying out repairs at the nearby workshop at Ponmalai. The base was used from May 1942 to early 1944, with three squadrons operating out of the airfield.

Flying squadrons
Squadron	From	Till	Aircraft
No. 20 Squadron RAF	31 July 1944	21 September 1944	Hawker Hurricane Mk IID
No. 5 Squadron RAF	29 October 1944	14 December 1944	Republic Thunderbolt Mk I, Mk II
No. 123 Squadron RAF	29 October 1944	3 December 1944	Republic Thunderbolt Mk II

It served as the headquarters of the No. 173 Wing (25 November 1942–19 October 1943) and No. 171 Wing (1 August–8 November 1943) during the war. During and after the war, the airfield was used for aircraft maintenance and calibration. It housed the Nos. 121, 101, and 138 Repair & Salvage units (1942–1945), No. 2 Civil Maintenance unit (1943–1946), No. 1580 Calibration Flight (February 1944–October 1945), No. 1583 Calibration Flight (February 1944–15 November 1945). It was also used as a center for ferry flights (April 1944–February 1946), and as a staging post (March 1945–April 1946), and personnel transit centre (September 1945–November 1945).

=== Post Indian Independence ===
In 1947, the Ceylon government requested the Indian government permission to operate flights between Colombo and Trichinopoly in 1947. The Indian government improved the airport to make it operational for commercial flights with the flight operations to Colombo beginning in February 1948. On 3 December 1948, Air Ceylon inaugurated a regular weekly commercial service between Colombo and Karachi, using a Douglas DC-3 aircraft via Tiruchirappalli and Bombay. In 1950, Air Ceylon operated daily flights from Colombo to Tiruchirapalli via Jaffna. Two years later, Air India started operating daily flights on the Bombay-Madras-Tiruchirappalli-Colombo route, which was later transferred to the Indian airlines.

=== Expansion and modernisation ===
In the late 1980s, Air Lanka operated regular weekly flights from Tiruchirappalli to Colombo. In the 1990s, Indian Airlines started operating regular international flights to the Middle East. In the late 2000s, the airport became a hub for low cost carriers operating to South East Asia. A new passenger terminal building was commissioned in 2009, and the old passenger terminal was converted to handle cargo operations. The airport was categorised as a customs airport until 4 October 2012, when it was given international status by the Ministry of Civil Aviation. In 2012, a request was made to name the airport after scientist C. V. Raman, who was from the city. Later, requests were made to rename the airport after A. P. J. Abdul Kalam in 2015.

As a part of a proposed expansion plan in the 2010s, the AAI intended to expand the airport by 210 ha (510 acres) with the extension of the runway, addition of new parking bays, and construction of a new passenger terminal and ATC complex. In 2014, the airport was one of the non-metro airports selected for ₹2 billion (US$21 million) development in a Public-Private Partnershipmodel. The new integrated passenger terminal was opened in 2024 and replaced the terminal built in 2009.

== Facilities ==
=== Runway ===
The airport has a single 2,427 m (7,963 ft) long runway 09/27 (Northeast–Southwest orientation) equipped with CAT-I Instrument Landing System for IFR. The old 1,456 m (4,777 ft) runway 15/33 was closed as part of early development, and is used as an alternate taxiway to the main apron. The re-carpeting work on the active runway 09/27 was completed during February 2020 to July 2021 at a cost of ₹200 million (US$2.1 million). In 2025, the Airports Authority of India (AAI) proposed to extend the primary runway to 3,800 m (12,500 ft) at a cost of ₹2.3 billion (US$24 million).

=== Apron and taxiways ===
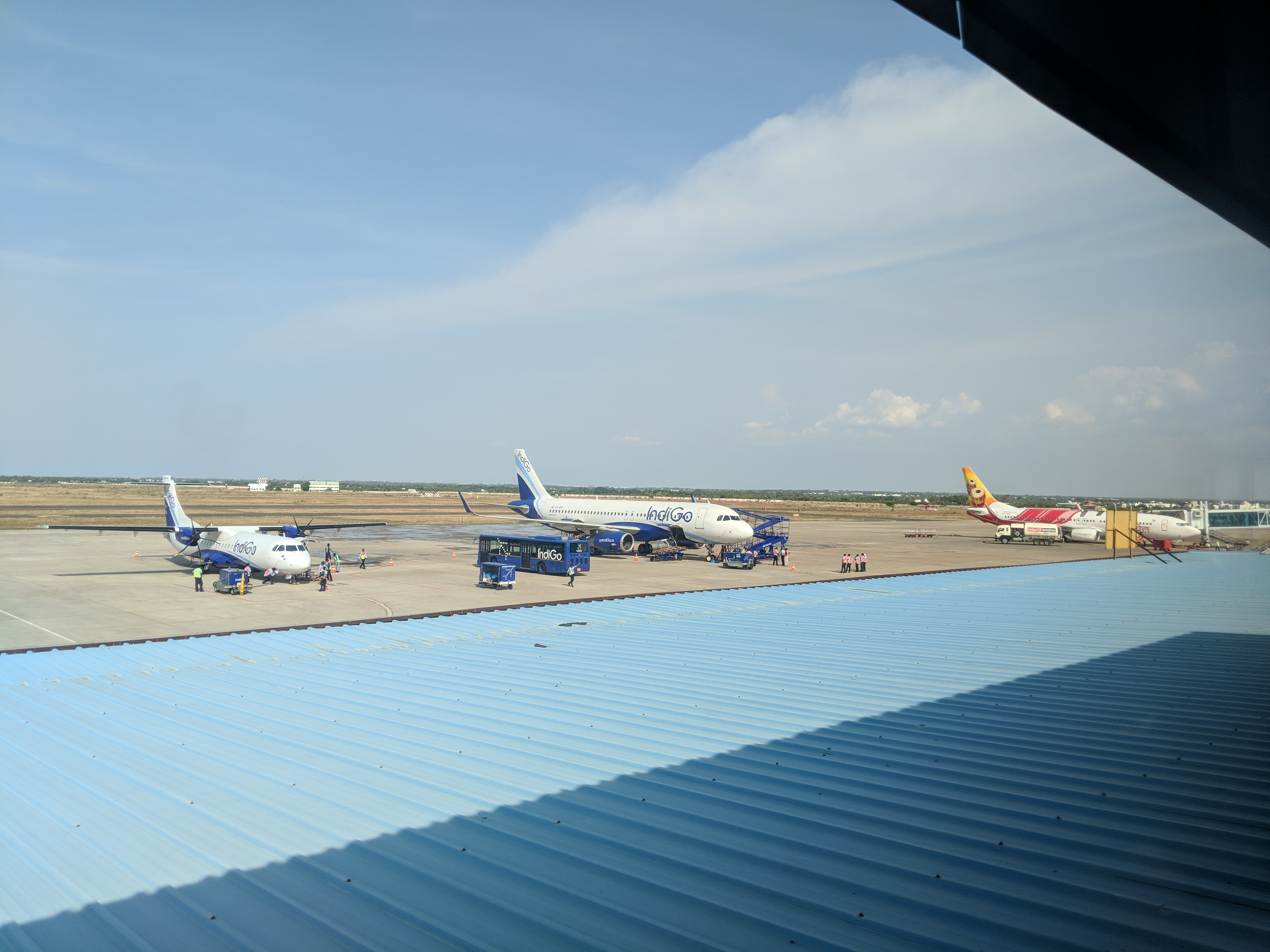
View of the main apron

There were four taxiways designated from A to D, which connected to the main apron with seven parking stands. The ministry of civil aviation initiated the plan to expand the apron to provide two more aircraft bays, increasing the bay count to nine. The AAI has expanded the existing apron with the construction of a third aerobridge and ramp equipment area, measuring 2,800 m^{2} (30,000 sq ft) at an estimated cost of ₹22.5 million (US$230,000), which became active in January 2019. In December 2023, a new apron of 15,580 m^{2} (167,700 sq ft) area was added with ten additional parking stands (10 to 20), three parallel taxiways (E1 to E3) and four new taxiways (F to J).

Parking bays at Tiruchirappalli airport
Stand numbers	PCN	Aircraft	Remarks
1-4	70/R/C/W/T	B739/A321 or below	Concrete surface
5-7	84/R/B/W/T	B767-200 or below	Concrete surface with aerobridges
8	68/R/B/W/T	A321 or below	Concrete surface
10-20	87/R/B/W/T	A321 or below	Concrete surface with aerobridges
ISO Bay	64/R/B/W/T	A321 or below	Concrete surface

=== Passenger terminal ===
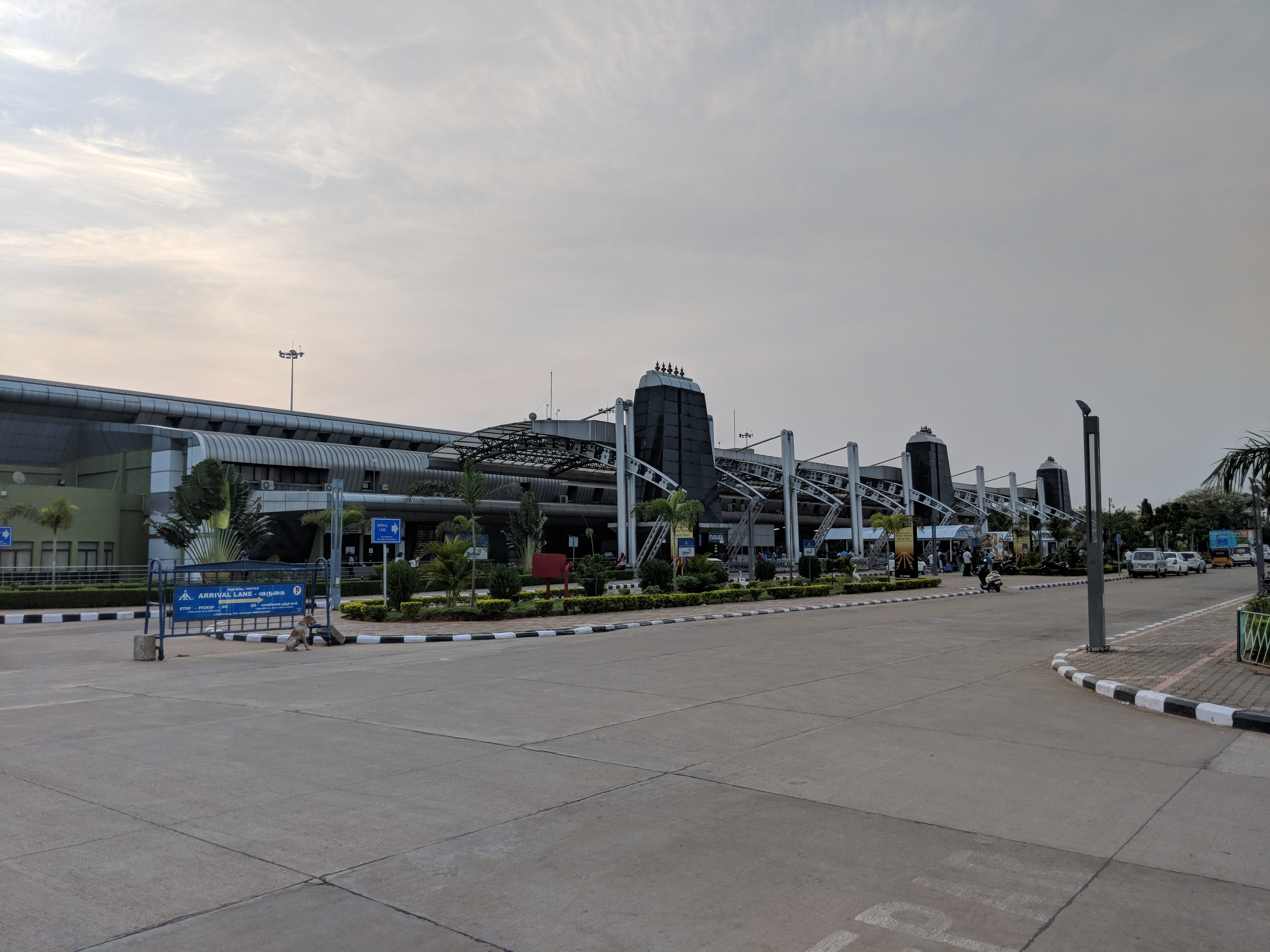
The passenger terminal opened in 2009

The airport has three adjacent terminals. The original passenger terminal was replaced by a new terminal in 2009, which was later replaced by a new integrated passenger terminal in 2024. The passenger terminal, inaugurated on 21 February 2009, was built at a cost of ₹800 million (US$8.3 million), and started operations from 1 June 2009. The two-story terminal has a floor area of 11,777 m^{2} (126,770 sq ft) with a handling capacity of 490,000 passengers per annum, and peak hour capacity of 470 passengers. It was equipped with 12 check-in counters, four customs counters, 16 immigration counters, three conveyor belts, five scanners, and four security check units.

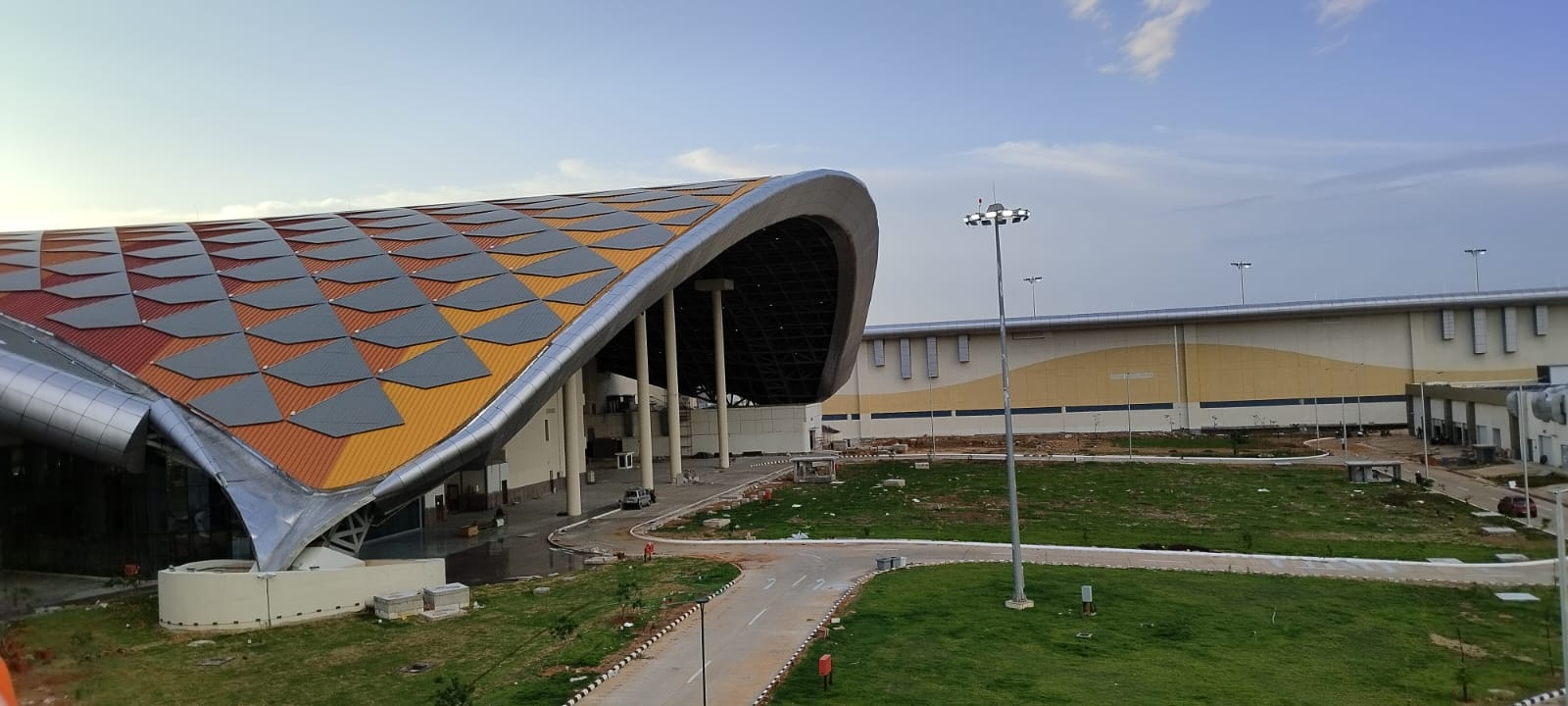
The new integrated passenger terminal opened in 2024

Due to the increase in air traffic, it was planned to expand the existing terminal by 180 m (590 ft) on both sides, by constructing an additional 17,920 square metres (192,900 sq ft) area, which would increase the passenger handling capacity to 1,075 peak-hour passengers. Later, the plan was shelved in favour of the construction of a new two-level passenger terminal at a cost of ₹9.51 billion (US$99 million) in February 2019. The construction started after the foundation stone was laid on 10 February 2019, with the project expected to completed on October 2021. The terminal is situated on the southern side, and a four-lane elevated access road was built from the NH-336 passing besides the original terminal.

The terminal was designed by a French company, Egis Group, in partnership with the British architectural firm, Pascall+Watson. The construction contract was awarded to ITD Cementation in August 2018. It was completed at a cost of ₹11.12 billion (equivalent to ₹12 billion or US$120 million in 2026) and was inaugurated on 2 January 2024. The building has an area of 75,000 m^{2} (810,000 sq ft), with capacity to handle 4.5 million passengers annually and 3,480 passengers during peak hour. It began operations from 11 June 2024. The terminal's design is inspired by the monuments of Tiruchirapalli, Tamil festivals and art forms. A replica of the south gopuram (ornate tower at the entrance of Hindu temples) of the Ranganathaswamy temple, is placed along the main entrance. The roof of the terminal has been designed with elements from Dravidian architecture. The terminal consists of 11 boarding gates with five aerobridges, 26 domestic and 34 international check-in counters, 60 immigration counters, 44 emigration counters, five baggage carousels, three lounges, 19 baggage scanning systems, and an associated parking splace for 1250 cars and 10 buses with electric charging bays.

=== Cargo terminal ===
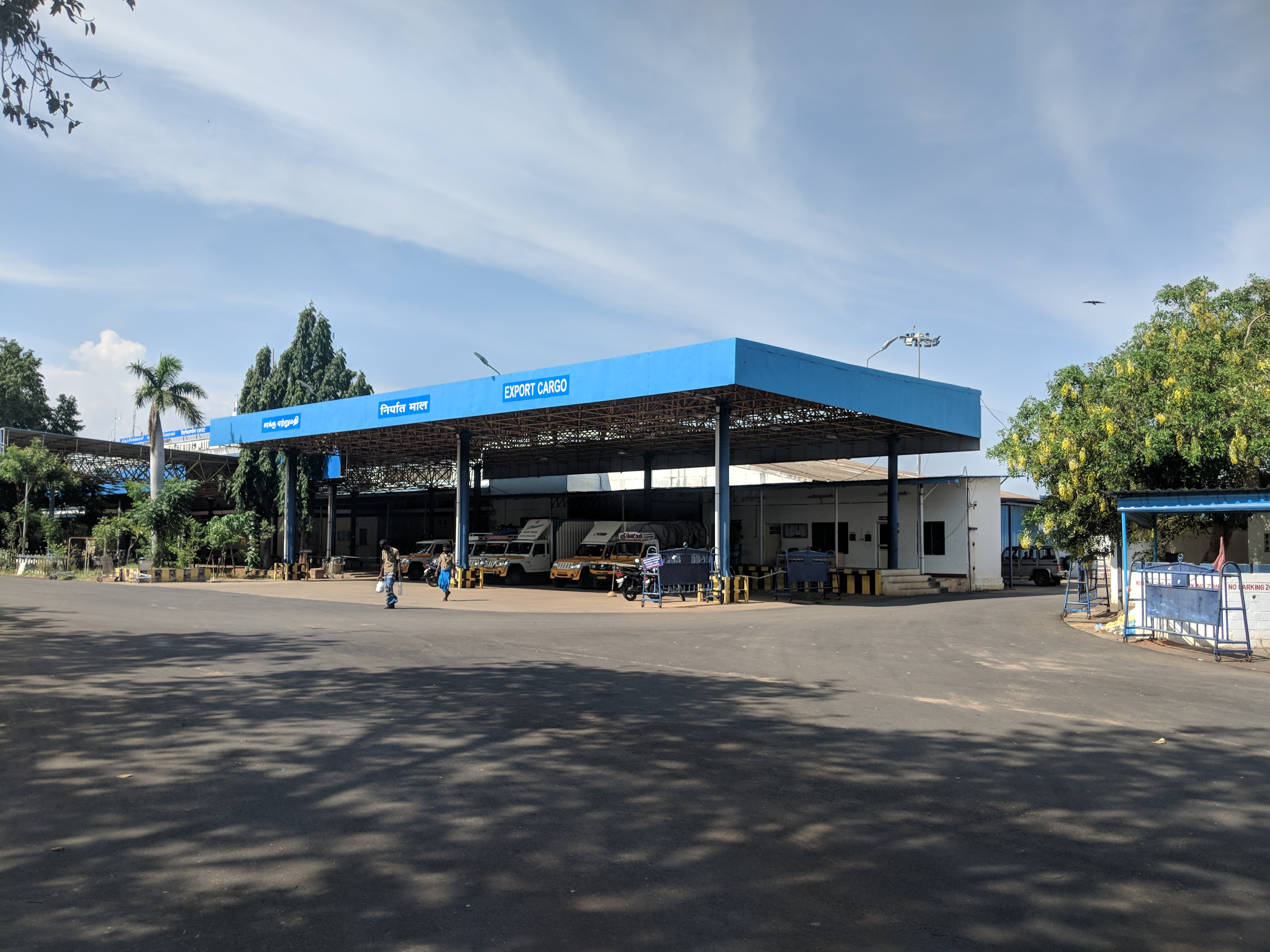
Cargo terminal

After the construction of a new passenger terminal in 2009, the old terminal was converted into a cargo complex at a cost of ₹10 million (US$100,000). The cargo complex is spread over an area of 4,000 m^{2} (43,000 sq ft) with the export wing occupying 2,193 m^{2} (23,610 sq ft) and 1,750 m^{2} (18,800 sq ft) demarcated for imports. It started international cargo operations on 21 November 2011 after the Central Board of Excise and Customs approved and notified the airport as an air cargo complex. The cargo terminal has a holding capacity of 250 metric tonnes, and serves as an export hub for the central region of Tamil Nadu.

On 11 October 2013, a cold storage facility, with a capacity of five-metric tons, was inaugurated at the airport. On 21 April 2017, an additional dedicated import cargo facility was established on a 190 m^{2} (2,000 sq ft) area at a cost of ₹2 million (US$21,000). On 22 July 2026, the airport got approval from the Bureau of Civil Aviation Security to begin domestic cargo operations from the airport.

=== Air traffic control ===
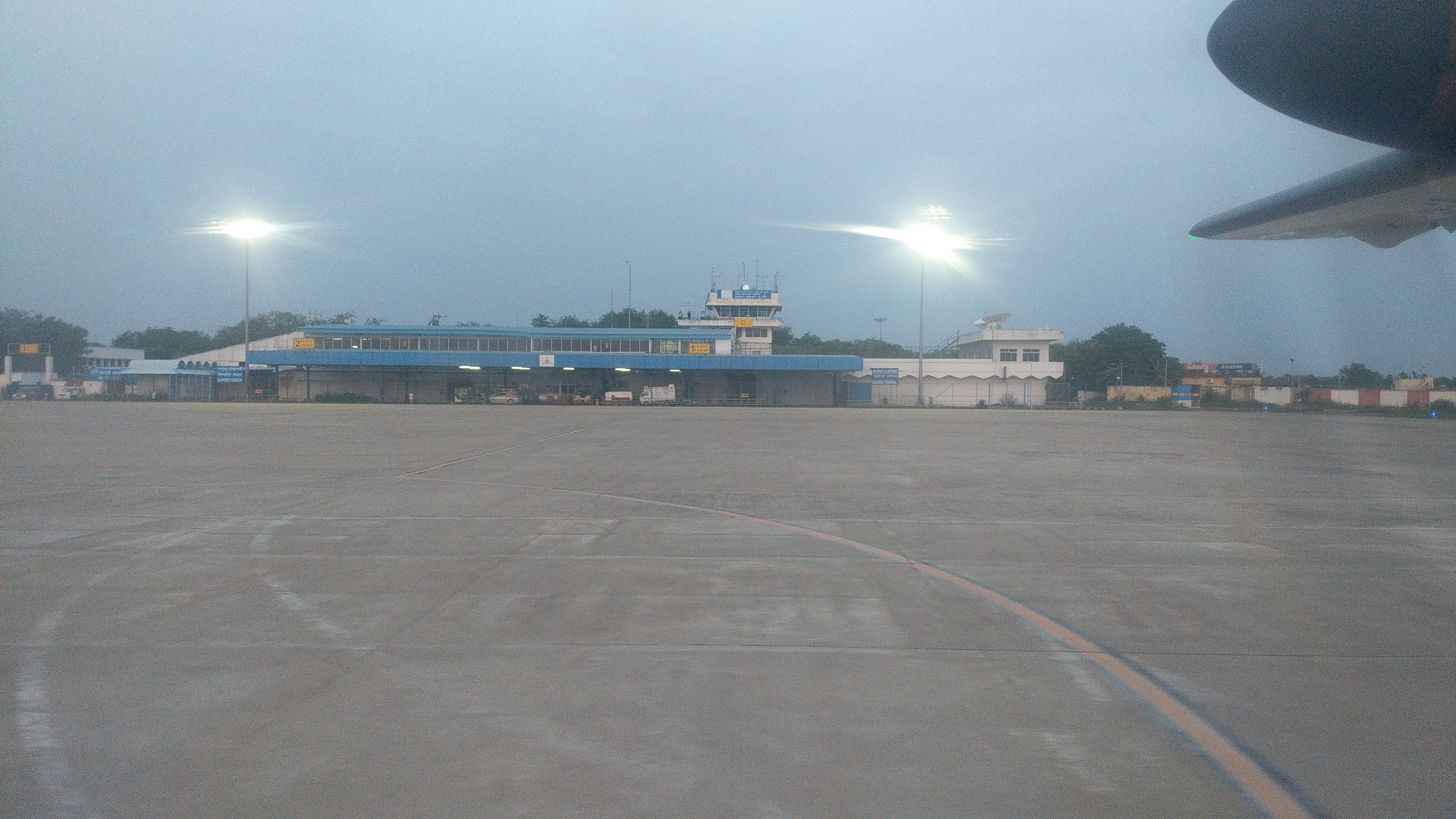
ATC tower alongside the old terminal

The Air Traffic Control (ATC) is located alongside the old terminal building. As a part of the expansion project, a new ATC building and technical block were proposed to be constructed. The 46 m (151 ft) tall ATC tower was planned to be constructed at a cost of ₹514.9 million (US$5.3 million), with work beginning in July 2023.

=== Other facilities ===
Air Works operates a line maintenance facility to conduct transit checks on Airbus A320 aircraft operated by Scoot. Air India Express maintains an engineering stores and maintenance facility for service and repairs of its aircraft.

The Madras Flying Club was established in 1929, and operated from the Chennai airport. In 2018, it announced plans to shift operations to Tiruchirapalli due to congestion and operational difficulties at Chennai. It began operations at the airport on 10 January 2020, with six training aircraft. The Government of Tamil Nadu allocated two acres (0.81 ha) of its land adjacent to the airport for the club to set up its operational infrastructure.

== Airlines and destinations ==
Airlines	Destinations
AirAsia	Kuala Lumpur–International
Air India Express	Abu Dhabi, Bengaluru, Dubai–International, Muscat, Sharjah, Singapore
Batik Air Malaysia	Kuala Lumpur–International
IndiGo	Abu Dhabi, Bengaluru, Chennai, Delhi, Hyderabad, Jaffna, Mumbai, Singapore
Scoot	Singapore
SriLankan Airlines	Colombo–Bandaranaike

== Connectivity ==
The airport is located on the National Highway 336, with government bus services connecting the airport to the central bus terminus and major railway stations in Tiruchirappalli.

== Accidents and incidents ==
- On 21 December 1949, an Air Ceylon flight operated by a Douglas DC-3 aircraft (named "Sunethra Devi" and registered as VP-CAT) from Colombo to Tiruchirappalli via Jaffna, crash landed at the airport. There were no fatalities but all three crew members along with one of the 21 passengers sustained injuries. The accident was caused by engine issues, and the aircraft was heavily damaged and written off.
- On 25 December 1965, a Douglas DC-3 aircraft (registered as VT-DUC) met with an accident while landing at the airport. The accident was determined as due to pilot error, and the aircraft received substantial damage with injuries to one passenger and two crew members.
- On 29 May 1980, Indian Airlines flight IC529, a Boeing 737-200 (registered as VT-EGD), operating from Madras to Tiruchirappalli 122 passengers and 6 crew members, could not land at the airport and sustained damage to its left wing during a go-around. The flight returned to Madras and landed safely with the plane sustaining substantial damage.
- On 11 October 2018, Air India Express flight IX611 from Tiruchirappalli to Dubai, operated by Boeing 737-800 (registered as VT-AYD), suffered a tail strike, and hit the ILS and boundary wall while taking off at 1:18 a.m. The pilots continued the flight, and the flight was diverted to Mumbai, where it landed safely. The fuselage, engine cowling and flight control surfaces were severely damaged with debris lodged in the landing gear.
- On 11 October 2024, Air India Express flight IX613, a Boeing 737-800 aircraft (registered as VT-AYB), flying from Tiruchirapalli to Sharjah, suffered a hydraulic failure in its landing gear assembly. After engaging in a holding pattern over the airport for over two hours, the flight, with 141 passengers, landed safely at the airport.
