= Peravurani railway station =

Railway station in Tamil Nadu, India

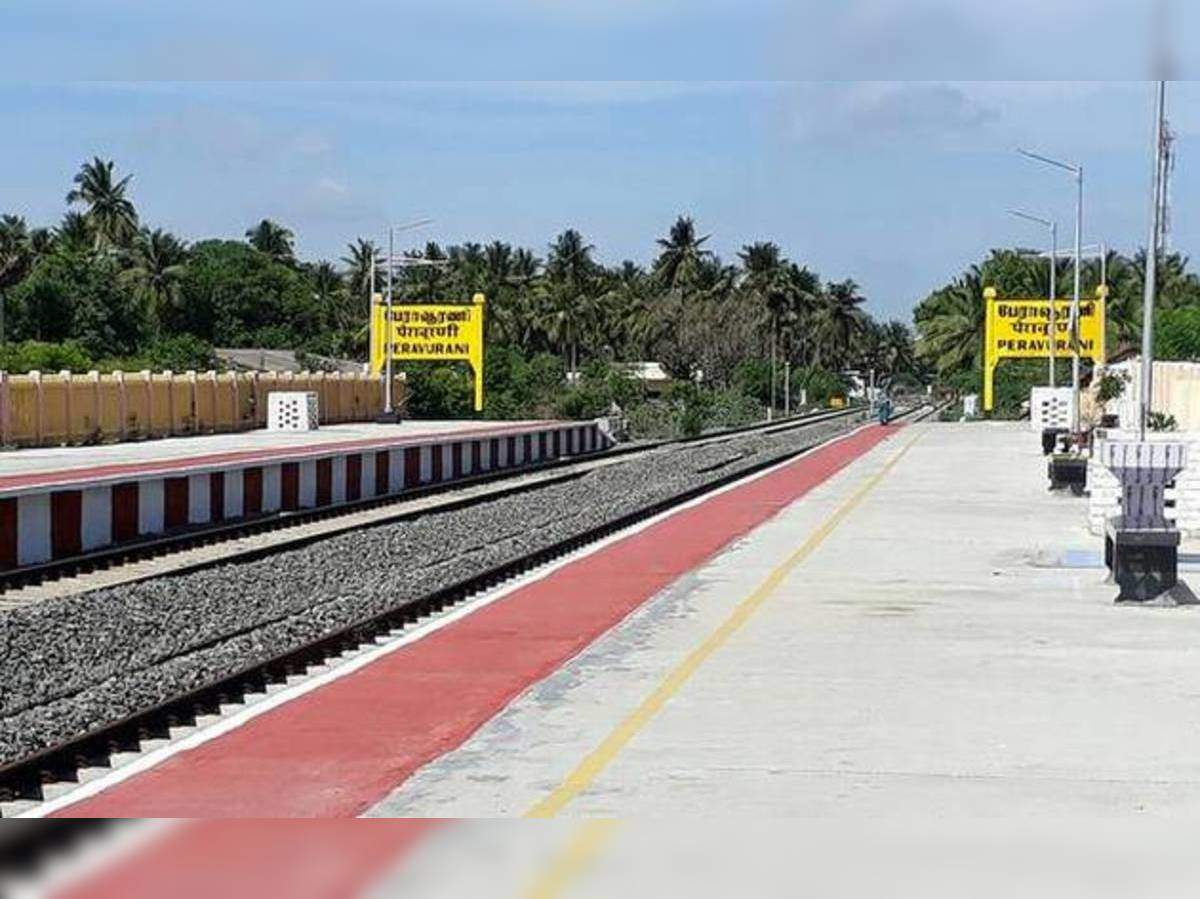

General information
- Location: Railway Station Road, Peravurani, Thanjavur district, Tamil Nadu, Pincode-614804; India
- Coordinates: 10.2854°N 79.2004°E
- Elevation: 28 metres (92 ft)
- System: Express train, commuter rail and Passenger train station
- Owner: Indian Railways
- Operator: Southern Railway zone
- Line: Thiruvarur Junction–Karaikudi Junction line
- Platforms: 2
- Tracks: 2
- Connections: auto rickshaw stand

Construction
- Structure type: Standard (on-ground station)
- Parking: Available
- Accessible: Disabled access

Other information
- Status: Active
- Station code: PVI
- Zone(s): Southern Railway zone
- Division(s): Tiruchirapalli

History
- Opened: 1903; 123 years ago
- Rebuilt: 2019; 7 years ago
- Electrified: Under Process
Route map
Location
- Location within Tamil Nadu

Peravurani railway station (station code: PVI) is an NSG–6 category Indian railway station in Tiruchirappalli railway division of Southern Railway zone. It is a railway station serving the town of Peravurani in Tamil Nadu, India. This station was first opened on 31.12.1903 along with Pattukottai to Aranthangi section before independence. This station located in the thiruvarur -karaikudi section one of the longest stretch in Tiruchirappalli railway division .

== Background ==
The railway station is located just within the town. It was connected to Thiruvarur Junction towards north and Karaikkudi Junction towards south. The station was initially built with metre-gauge infrastructure and had three passenger services daily with one express and two passenger trains. The nearest bus services were available at Peravurani town while the nearest airport is situated 90 kilometres (56 mi) away at Tiruchirappalli.

== Trains ==
After reopening only 4 trains Runs on this section. and only two trains stopped in this station. People of Peravurani Demand to stop 20683/20684 TBM-SCT-TBM SF EXPRESS (TRI WEEKLY) at Peravurani and more daily trains via this station. current running trains are

06197/06198 TVR-KKDI-TVR EXPRESS (WEEKLY SIX DAYS)

06035/06036 ERS-VLNK EXPRESS (WEEKLY)
