= National Highway 85 (India) =

National highway in India

National Highway 85
- Map of the National Highway in red

Route information
- Part of AH43
- Length: 468 km (291 mi)

Major junctions
- West end: NH 66 / NH 966B in Kochi, Kerala
- NH 185 in Adimali; NH 183 in Theni; NH 44 / NH 785 / AH43 in Madurai; NH 38 in Viraganur; NH 87 in Tiruppuvanam; NH 36 in Sivaganga
- East end: NH 32 in Thondi, Tamil Nadu

Location
- Country: India
- States: Kerala, Tamil Nadu
- Primary destinations: Ernakulam – Muvattupuzha – Kothamangalam – Adimali – Munnar – Devikulam – Bodinayakkanur – Theni – Usilampatti – Madurai – Sivaganga– Kalaiyarkoil -Thondi

Highway system
- Roads in India; Expressways; National; State; Asian
← NH 66	→ NH 32

National Highway 85 (NH 85) is a National Highway in southern India. It links Kochi in Kerala with Thondi, Tamil Nadu. The section between Kochi and Madurai formed part of the old NH 49 before the 2010 renumbering of national highways in India.

The Kochi–Theni Greenfield Highway has been proposed to decongest the traffic between the Kochi and Munnar stretch on the NH 85.

== Route ==
Starting from NH66 intersection in Kundanoor Junction at Maradu, Kochi, Ernakulam, Kolenchery, Muvattupuzha, Kothamangalam, Neriamangalam, Adimali, Munnar, Devikulam, Poopara in Kerala. Bodi, Theni, Andippatti, Usilampatti, Madurai, Thiruppuvanam, Sivagangai, Kalayarkoil, and ending at Thondi at NH32 intersection in Tamil Nadu.

== Gallery ==
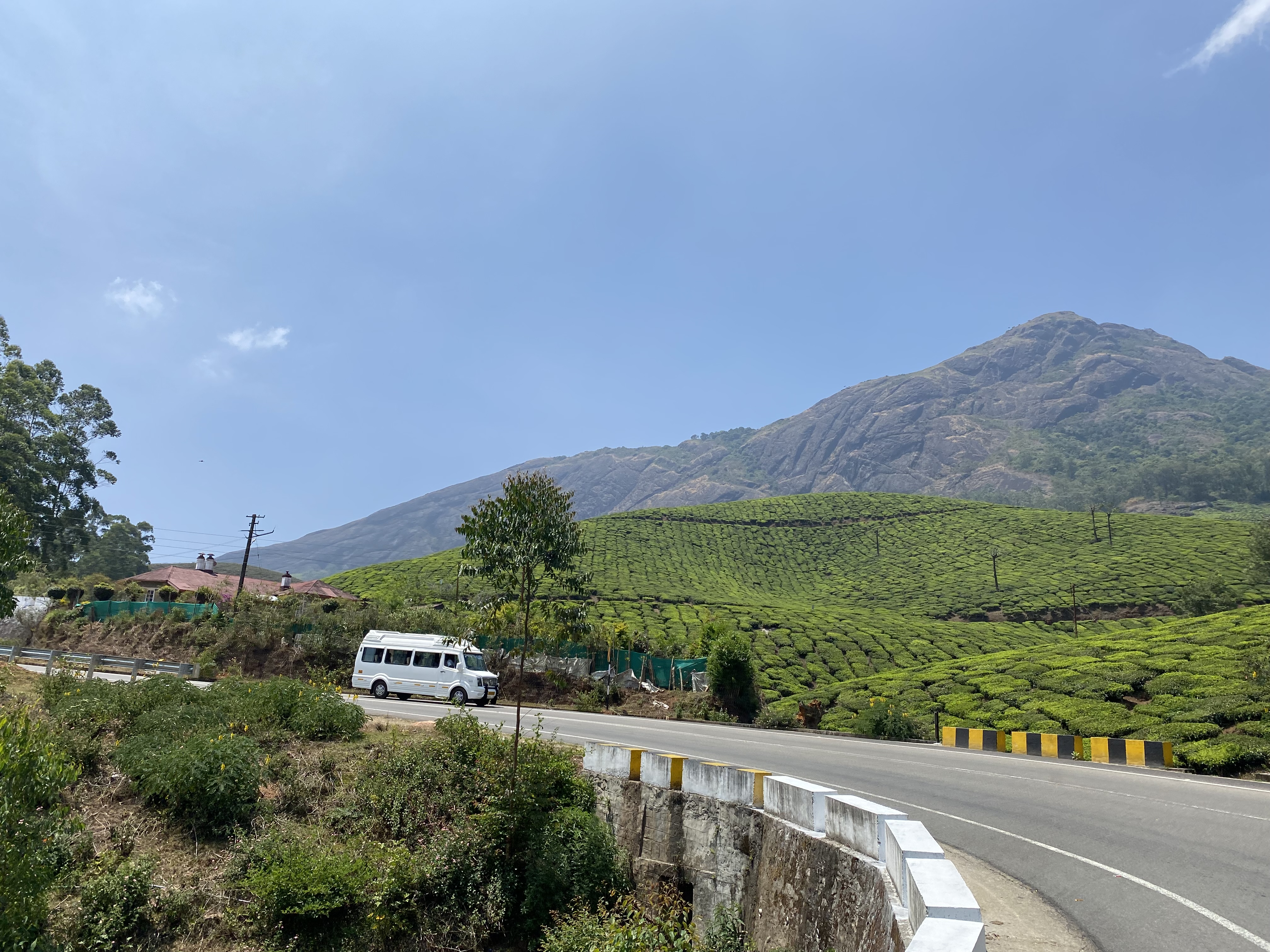
In Kannan Devan Hills, Idukki district, Kerala

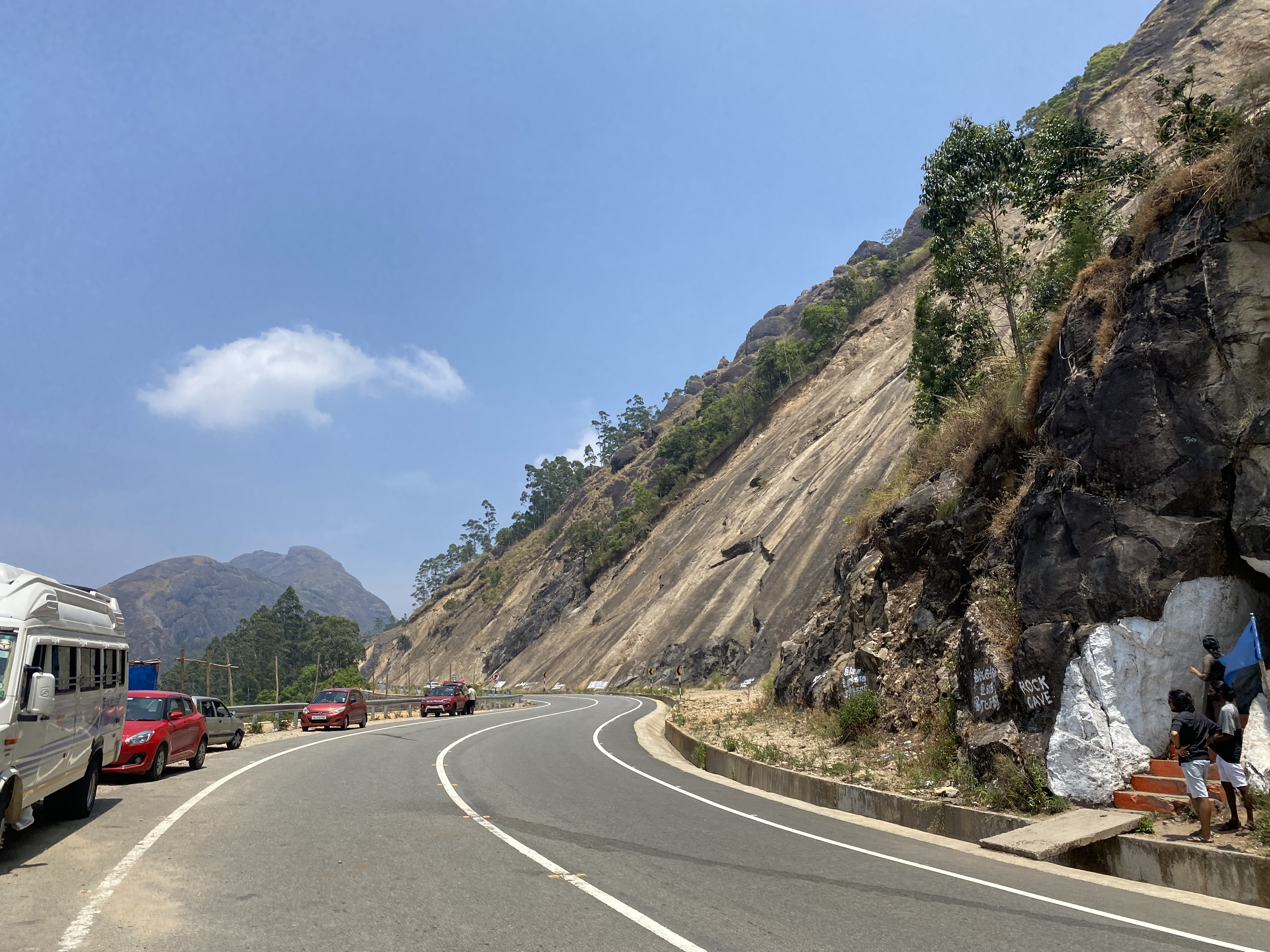
Gap Road in Chinnakanal, Idukki district, Kerala

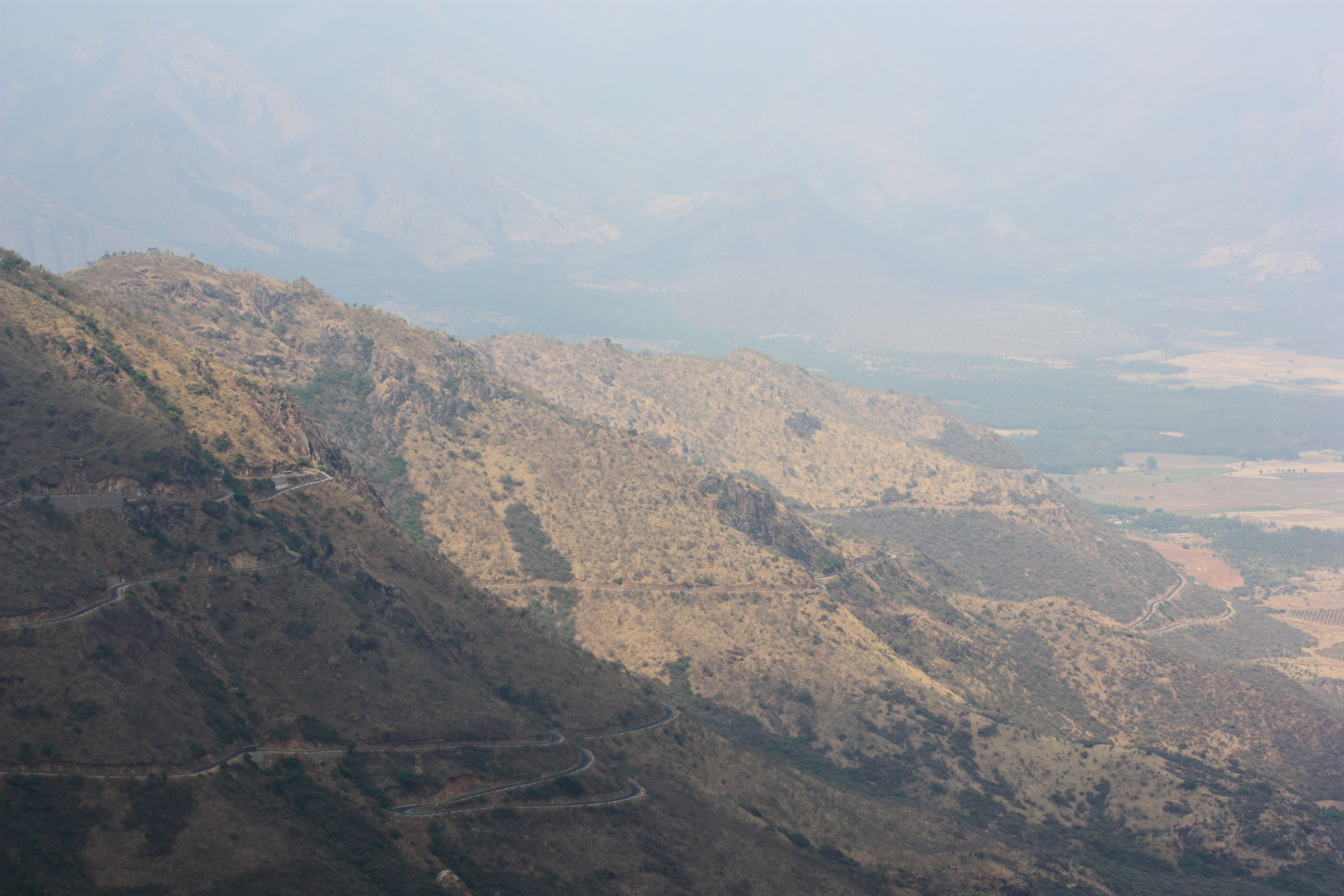
Winding road of NH 85 in Theni district, Tamil Nadu
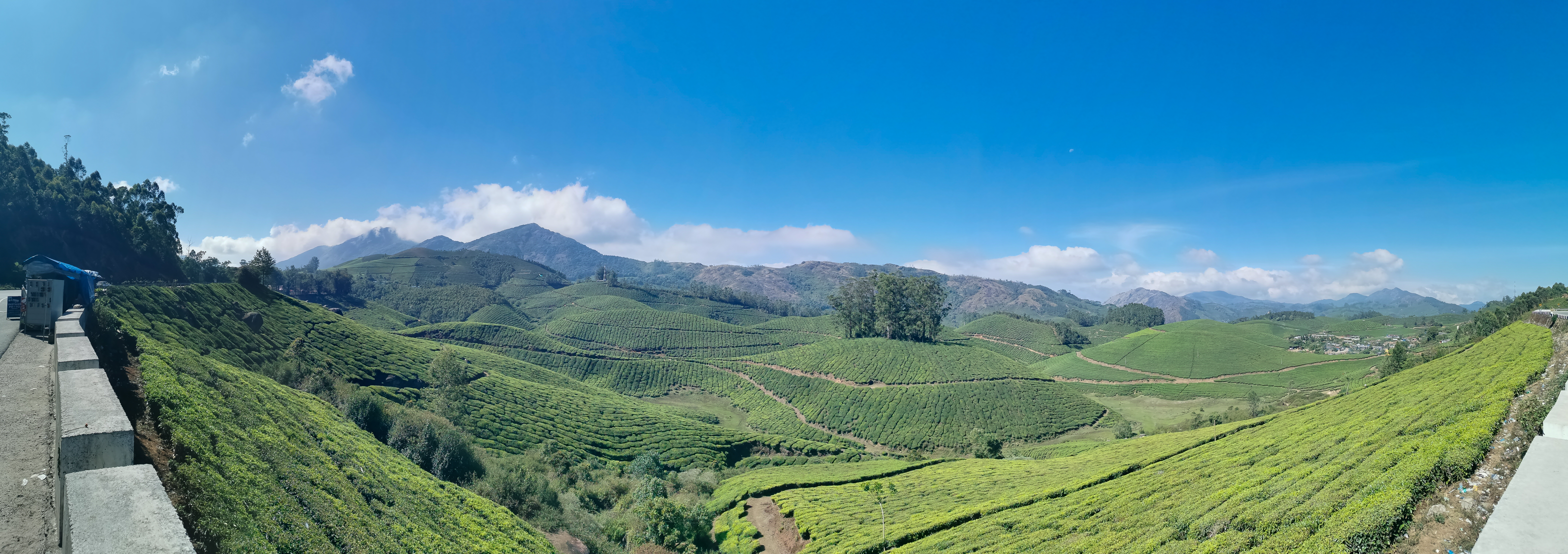
Tea plantations viewed from NH85 in Munnar, Idukki district, Kerala

== See also ==
- List of national highways in India
- Kochi–Theni Greenfield Highway
- National Highways Development Project
