= National Highway 536 (India) =

National highway in India

National Highway 536
- Map of National Highway 536 in red

Route information
- Length: 109 km (68 mi)

Major junctions
- From: Tirumayam
- To: Ramanathapuram

Location
- Country: India
- Primary destinations: Karaikudi-Devakottai – Tiruvadanai

Highway system
- Roads in India; Expressways; National; State; Asian
← NH 36	→ NH 87

National Highway 536 (NH 536) is a National Highway in Tamil Nadu, India.
