= National Highway 132 (India) =

National highway in India

National Highway 132
- Map of National Highway 132 in red

Route information
- Length: 37 km (23 mi)

Major junctions
- From: Tindivanam
- To: Viluppuram

Location
- Country: India
- States: Tamil Nadu

Highway system
- Roads in India; Expressways; National; State; Asian
← NH 131	→ NH 133

National Highway 132 is a national highway of India. It runs entirely in Tamil Nadu.
