= National Highway 38 (India) =

National highway in India

National Highway 38
- Map of the National Highway in red

Route information
- Maintained by Tamil Nadu Highway Department
- Length: 604 km (375 mi)

Major junctions
- North end: NH 48 / NH 75 in Vellore
- List: NH 77 in Tiruvannamalai; NH 79 in Ulundurpettai; NH 81 in Bikshandarkoil; NH 67 / NH 83 in Tiruchirappalli; NH 85 in Madurai; NH 32 in Thoothukudi
- South end: V. O. Chidambaranar Port

Location
- Country: India

Highway system
- Roads in India; Expressways; National; State; Asian
| ← NH 37 | → NH 39 |

National Highway 38 (NH 38) is a National Highway in India. This highway runs entirely in the state of Tamil Nadu.

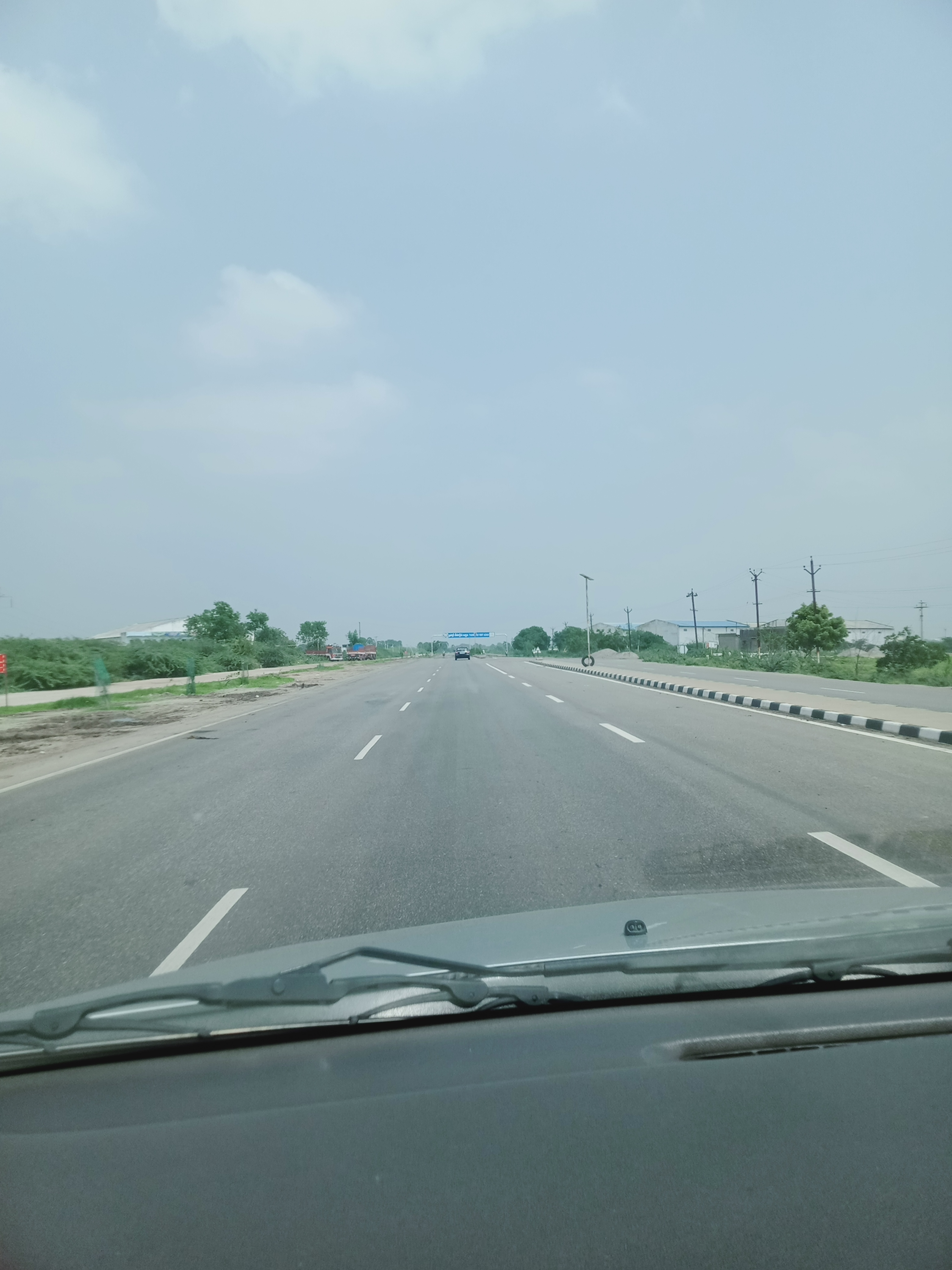
A portion of NH 38 near Thoothukudi

The National Highway NH-38 originates from Vellore and terminates at Thoothukudi. It passes through the major cities of Tamilnadu. The cities and towns includes ( from Vellore to Thoothukudi) Polur, Tiruvannamalai, Villupuram, Ulundurpettai, Perambalur, Trichy, Melur, Madurai, Aruppukottai, Ettayapuram.
