= William Lynch =

William Lynch may refer to:

== Politicians and lawyers ==
- William Lynch (diplomat) (c. 1730–1785), British Member of Parliament for Canterbury and Minister to Sardinia
- William Lynch (Lynch law) (1742–1820), American military officer who claimed to be the originator of the term Lynch Law
- William Lynch (Maryland politician) (1788–1857), American politician from Maryland
- William A. Lynch (1844–1907), Ohio lawyer and politician
- William Warren Lynch (1845–1916), Canadian lawyer, politician, and judge in the province of Quebec
- William H. Lynch (fl. 1880s), Mississippi legislator
- William Joseph Lynch (1908–1976), U.S. federal judge
- William Lynch Jr. (1941–2013), Deputy Mayor of New York City under David Dinkins and political consultant
- William B. Lynch (born 1943), Adjutant General of Pennsylvania
- William Lynch (Toronto politician) (fl. 1974)
- William Lynch (New Hampshire politician), American politician in New Hampshire

== Sportsmen ==
- Bill Lynch (footballer) (1892–1947), Australian rules footballer
- Billy Lynch (Australian footballer) (1909–1985), played for North Melbourne and Essendon
- Billy Lynch (rugby league), rugby league footballer of the 1900s, and 1910s for England, Yorkshire, and Wakefield Trinity
- Bill Lynch (born 1954), American football player and coach
- William Lynch (hammer thrower) (born 1916), American hammer thrower, runner-up at the 1938 USA Outdoor Track and Field Championships

== Others ==
- William F. Lynch (1801–1865), captain in the Virginia Navy, who commanded southern forces during the Union attack on Fort Fisher, North Carolina
- William Francis Lynch (general) (1839–1876), U.S. Army officer
- Willie Lynch, the probably fictional author of the dubious William Lynch speech
