= May 2017 Jharkhand mob lynchings =

Lynching in India

2017 Jharkhand Mob Lynching
- Part of Violence by cow vigilantes
- East Singhbhum District (India) East Singhbhum District (Jharkhand)
- Location: Jharkhand, India
- Date: 12 May 2017- 18 May 2017
- Attack type: Mob lynching
- Deaths: 9
- Injuries: 2
- Motive: Cow vigilantism

2017 Jharkhand Mob Lynching was a case of mob lynching that occurred in May 2017 in the Indian state of Jharkhand, specifically in the Kolhan division. At least nine people, including four Muslim cattle traders, were killed in four separate incidents. The incidents were triggered by rumors of child theft.

== Events ==
On 18 May 2017, a violent mob killed four Muslim cattle traders passing through the village of Shobhapur. The group had set out from Haldipokhar, in the East Singhbhum District, the night before to buy cattle in Seraikela-Kharsawan.

On the evening of 18 May, in a tribal village in East Singhbhum called Nagadih, the mob dragged three people from a house and beat them to death. An elderly woman was also severely injured during the assault.

On 21 May 2017, a 39-year-old Muslim named Munna Ansari, from Ranchi district, was beaten by a mob while traveling from Kolkata to Ranchi. Ansari was supposed to change buses at Purulia, but he mistakenly boarded a wrong bus to Adityapur. A few hours later, a group of people cornered him near the Belidih locality, asking him about his identity and residence. The mob barely let Ansari speak and beat him so mercilessly that he had to be hospitalised. He was later discharged from the hospital on 22 May.

== Reactions ==
Villagers from the Muslim community called for a shutdown and protested in a suburb of Jamshedpur, demanding the immediate arrest of those involved in the murders of the four cattle traders. Eighteen people were arrested in connection with the mob killings and the subsequent violence.

On 21 May, India's National Human Rights Commission issued a notice to the Director General of Jharkhand Police regarding mob lynching, seeking a detailed report within four weeks.

== See also ==
- 2016 Jharkhand mob lynching
- Tabrez Ansari lynching
