= 2023 Haryana riots =

Communal violence in Haryana, India

Haryana riots
- Part of Religious violence in India
- Date: 31 July 2023 - 8 August 2023
- Location: Haryana, India: • Nuh • Gurugram
- Caused by: Monu Manesar would be attending Hindu religious procession organised by VHP and Bajrang Dal. He was absent there.; Crackdown on cybercrime by Nuh authorities.
- Methods: Rioting, shootings, arson, stone pelting, physical assault with sticks.

Casualties
- Deaths: 7
- Injuries: 200+
- Arrested: 116

The 2023 Haryana riots, commonly referred to as the Nuh violence, were a series of clashes in northern India that originated in the district of Nuh and spread to nearby regions within Haryana. On 31 July 2023, communal violence erupted in Nuh, Haryana, between Muslims and Hindus during an annual Brajmandal Yatra pilgrimage organised by the Vishva Hindu Parishad (VHP). By that evening, related incidents of communal violence were reported from Gurugram and Sohna. As of 3 August 2023, the situation had resulted in at least seven fatalities and over 200 reported injuries.

On 20 July 2023, Bajrang Dal activist and cow vigilante Monu Manesar posted a video announcing that he would participate in the Yatra, which quickly went viral. The Muslim community of Nuh was outraged, as Manesar is wanted as a suspect in the February 2023 lynching of two Muslim men. Upon hearing that Manesar would be in the procession, young men from the local Muslim community organized, meeting from 21 July to 23 July to make plans for an attack. Manesar did not ultimately attend at the request of the organizers due to security concerns. Local police believed that Manesar's absence would keep the crowd calm enough for law enforcement to prevent violence.

Violence broke out on 31 July during the annual Brajmandal Yatra pilgrimage through the Muslim-majority district of Nuh. Rioters executed an attack on the procession, pelting it with stones, bottles, and molotov cocktails. This triggered retaliatory actions from the Hindu procession participants. The Hindus taking part in the procession were forced to flee to a nearby temple, which was then besieged by rioters armed with guns, who fired upon the temple. The police believe the attack on the procession was premeditated and well-organized.

In response, the government imposed a curfew, suspended Internet services, and sent extra paramilitary troops to the region to prevent a further outbreak of violence. Retaliatory violence broke out in nearby districts. Hundreds of Muslim-owned shops and homes were bulldozed in the following days. Officials in Nuh claimed that the buildings destroyed were illegally erected or belonged to rioters, but there was no investigation or advance notice given to owners before their properties were razed. Calm and order were said to have been restored on 8 August 2023.

== Background ==
The Brajmandal Yatra in Haryana's Nuh district was initiated by the Vishwa Hindu Parishad (VHP) in 2020 to revive sacred Hindu sites in the area. Nuh, previously known as Mewat, is believed to be home to three ancient Shiva lingas from the time of the Pandavas and a grazing site used by Krishna. VHP leaders claim that these sites are under threat of encroachment by influential individuals in the region. The Mewat Darshan Yatra, which is part of the Brajmandal Yatra, aims to restore the significance of these religious sites. The yatra commences in Sohna and begins with a ceremonial "jal (water) abhishek" at the ancient Nalhar Mahadev Temple near the city of Nuh. The yatra then proceeds to visit other temples in the region, including the Jhirakeshwar Mahadev, Shrangar village's Radha Krishna Temple, and the Shringeshwar Mahadev Temple. There were around 25,000 participants in the 2023 yatra, including organizations such as the Bharatiya Gau Raksha Dal and the Bajrang Dal. The yatra is attended by Nuh's Hindu population, which constitutes about 20% of residents, as well as devotees from other districts in Haryana.

Nuh is part of the Mewat region, home to the Meo community who converted to Islam during the Muslim period. Mewat was one of the few regions to retain a significant Muslim population after Indian independence, with Muslims accounting for 79.2% of the population in 2011. Many Hindutva leaders, including Bhartiya Janata Party MLA Madan Dilawar, have accused the district of being a "mini-Pakistan"; these comments have been condemned by others. According to The Quint, many local police accused the Muslims in the district of being not loyal to India. Social media campaigns have spread hatred toward local Muslims, accusing them of kidnapping and sexually assaulting female residents.

Cow slaughter is illegal in Haryana and punishable by up to ten years in prison due to cows' religious significance in Hinduism. There has been tension in the region due to clashes between individuals illegally slaughtering cows or smuggling beef and gau rakshaks (lit. 'Cow protectors') trying to stop them. Incidents of cow vigilantism have increased in the district since 2014, when Hindu nationalist PM Narendra Modi was elected. The 2017 murder of Nuh resident Pehlu Khan by cow vigilantes gained national headlines. Several Mahapanchayats (Note: A mahapanchayat is a gathering of people from around 10-12 villages to discuss local issues.) have been held in Nuh which resulted in calls for anti-Muslim violence. More recently, in February 2023, 2 Meo Muslim men suspected of cattle smuggling were allegedly lynched near Loharu by a mob led by cow vigilante and Hindutva activist Monu Manesar. The murders provoked mass protests in the town of Ferozepur Jhirka, near the city of Nuh, calling for the arrest of the accused and an end to cow vigilantism. Communal tension increased when a Mahapanchayat was held in the nearby Palwal district in support of Monu Manesar, which featured calls for anti-Muslim violence. When Manesar announced that he would be participating in the Yatra, many in Nuh's Muslim community saw it as an open act of incitement.

== Riots ==
=== Nuh ===
Police were given information about the Yatra in advance, including an estimated number of attendees, the status of Monu Manesar's attendance, and that Hindu participants would be chanting and waving sticks and swords. Authorities believed that since Manesar would not be attending, no additional backup would be needed to control the crowd.

The attacks began in Khedla Mod, Nuh, when a mob stopped Brajmandal Yatra and attacked participants. The mob, which was composed primarily of men between the ages of 17 and 22, set fire to cars, homes, and shops of the local Hindu community. Around 14:00, roughly 2,500 Hindus, including BD (Bajrang Dal) and VHP (Vishwa Hindu Parishad) members, fled to a nearby Nulhar Mahadev temple for shelter. The mob surrounded the temple, firing guns and throwing stones. The temple was surrounded by the rioters for about five hours before police reinforcements from other districts were able to rescue those sheltering inside. According to The Wire, the Nuh temple priest disputes the claim that people were "held hostage" at the Nulhar Mahadev temple. The temple priest recalled that:

"The violence started growing and by 4 PM, our temple had at least 3,000 to 4,000 people taking shelter in the courtyard…it was very difficult to reassure them that they will be safe inside the temple as they thought some or the other miscreant might break in and start targeting them"

Rioters also rammed a bus into the cyber police station of Nuh, which has gained a notorious reputation as a cybercrime hotspot in the country. Nuh District Inspector Vishvajeet (CID) reported that recent measures taken by the police to curb cybercrime and cow slaughter had caused frustration and resentment among local villagers. He stated that rigorous enforcement has caused problems for the villagers, leading locals to question the motives behind the frequent police raids on their homes. The cars outside the police station were set on fire. Other locations, such as Nuh bus stand, Nuh market, and Nuh grain market were also attacked by the rioters using rocks. A shopkeeper reported that the rioters in Nuh had robbed his store, stealing over ₹500,000 (US$5,200).

=== Gurugram ===
Despite the border to Nuh being sealed by law enforcement, violence spread to neighbouring Gurugram. A crowd of approximately 500 rioters began pelting stones and torching shops and cars in the Sohna region.

On 1 August 2023, the day after the riots, 22-year-old deputy Imam Mohammad Saad of the Anjuman Jama mosque in Gurugram was killed. A mob reportedly stabbed Saad more than a dozen times in the neck, chest, and abdomen before slitting his throat. A mosque caretaker named Mohammad Khurshid was also injured. The mob of nearly 100 people then allegedly broke into the under-construction mosque at Sector 57 and set it ablaze. This was the only mosque in New Gurugram on government-allocated land. According to the FIR filed by Station House Officer (SHO) Satish Kumar, he and six other police officers were on duty near the Anjuman Mosque and attempted to halt the mob, but were overpowered by the crowd, who hurled stones and opened fire at the officers. The Shahi Masjid in Sohna was allegedly vandalised by a mob of 70-100 men. The mosque's Imam, his family, and a group of 10-12 children studying at the madrasa inside escaped unhurt as members of Sikh community intervened and conducted a rescue operation.

The violence, which spread to several areas of Gurugram, included attacks on numerous commercial properties. Over 200 Muslim families fled their homes due to threats from right-wing outfits. On the evening of August 1, 2023, shops in Gurugram's Sectors 66 and 70A were set ablaze. Simultaneously, Bajrang Dal members organized a rally in Haryana's Bahadurgarh city, where they chanted anti-Muslim slogans such as "Desh ke gaddaron ko, Goli maaro saalon ko" ("Shoot the traitors of our country"). This chant was widely used by BJP politicians against Muslims during the anti-Citizenship Amendment Act protests in 2019 and 2020.

=== Premeditation ===
Police investigators stated that the Nuh riots were planned ahead of time, alleging that residents had made plans over WhatsApp group chats to attack the yatra between 21 July and 23 July, over a week before the attacks. Plans reportedly started after Monu Manesar announced that he would be attending the yatra in a video posted 20 July. These plans included assigning duties in the riots, including throwing stones and glass bottles. According to the police informants related to the case, the groups had collected more than 3,000 bottles and rocks ahead of time. The rioters allegedly arranged more than 200 bikes and painted over registration plates to avoid being identified by the police. Police raids have recovered "huge" volumes of stones and explosives.

== Casualties ==
Two Hindus taking part in the religious procession were killed. Abhishek Chauhan, 22, had come to Nuh with his brother for the procession. The brothers were attacked as they exited Shiv Mandir in Nalhar. His brother escaped safely, but Chauhan was killed. Pradeep Sharma, 32, was attacked by the mob when they saw his kalava and succumbed to his injuries at a Delhi hospital. Chauhan and Sharma were both activists for Bajrang Dal. A third fatality, a bystander, Shakti Singh, was also killed by the mob in Nuh.

A deputy imam of a Gurugram mosque named Mohammad Saad was also fatally attacked by a group of rioters. Several others who had taken shelter in the mosque sustained serious injuries.

Two Home Guard officers, Neeraj Khan and Home Guard Gursev Singh, were killed. Eight injured police personnel were transported to Gurugram's Medanta Hospital. Among the wounded, Hodal Deputy Superintendent of Police Sajjan Singh sustained a gunshot wound to the head, and an inspector was injured in the stomach.

== Response ==
The Government of Haryana banned all mobile Internet and SMS services in Nuh district from the evening of 31 July until 2 August 2023. A curfew was imposed in Nuh district. The sale of petrol was banned following its use by rioters in constructing makeshift explosives. Internet was also restricted in Palwal, Manesar and Pataudi. Alerts were issued for 11 districts in western Uttar Pradesh. Alerts were especially urgent in Mathura, which shares a border with Nuh.

In retaliation for initiating the violence, over 1,200 homes and shops were bulldozed in a Muslim-majority area in Haryana, resulting in accusations of ethnic cleansing. BJP officials gave contradictory explanations for the bulldozings, sometimes claiming that the buildings destroyed were illegally constructed, and other times claiming that the residents had been seen throwing rocks. While Indian law required that owners be given notice and an opportunity to appeal before their property can be destroyed, owners state that they were given no advance notice. Many report having no involvement in the violence. Haryana's high court ordered demolitions to stop on August 7, 2023. So-called "bulldozer justice" has become increasingly common in India since 2017, often targeting Muslim-majority areas controlled by BJP. Additionally, Haryana Urban Development Authority demolished over 200 illegal shanties that were housing migrant workers from Bangladesh in Taoru, near Nuh.

Haryana's Home Minister, Anil Vij, claimed that social media played a major role in escalating the violence in Nuh. To address this issue, the state government established a three-member committee responsible for monitoring social media activities from July 21 onward. According to an official statement, platforms like Facebook, Twitter, WhatsApp, and others will be monitored for posts that may incite violence.

Over 116 people were arrested in connection to the riots.

The Haryana Police announced compensation of ₹5,700,000 (US$71,000) each for the families of the two Home Guard officers, Neeraj Khan and Gursev Singh, who were killed.

The National Commission for Protection of Child Rights has requested an inquiry into the engagement of children in stone pelting and other illicit activities during the recent communal unrest in the Nuh district of Haryana.

The Haryana government sanctioned land to be created for a new Central Reserve Police Force's anti-riot unit Rapid Action Force to be stationed in Nuh. In addition, the headquarters of the IRB 2nd Battalion has been shifted to Nuh.

=== Statements by politicians ===
Nuh MLA Aftab Ahmed alleged that the riots were planned ahead of time, and the Yatri participants had used social media to provoke it. Punahana MLA Mohammad Ilyas similarly stated that inflammatory videos had been circulating for four days before the procession. Former Nuh MLA Habib Ur Rehman blamed the Nuh violence on the failure of the ruling BJP-Jannayak Janta Party (JJP) government, and claimed that the riots could have easily been prevented. Former Nuh MLA and BJP leader, Zakir Hussain claimed that it was a conspiracy to bring a bad name to Mewat, and that it was the handiwork of outsiders from both sides.

Manohar Lal Khattar, Chief Minister of Haryana, stated that there was a "well thought out conspiracy behind the clashes". Amid communal tensions in Haryana, state Home Minister Anil Vij stated that action will be taken against Monu Manesar and MLA Mamman Khan for their alleged involvement in the riots.

Union Minister and Gurugram MP, Rao Inderjit Singh, expressed apprehensions regarding the Nuh violence, raising inquiries about the factors that led to provocation from both sides. He questioned the presence of swords and sticks during a religious procession and acknowledged the possibility of provocation from the other side as well.

According to the Deputy Chief Minister of Haryana, Dushyant Chautala, the organizers of the Shobha Yatra failed to provide the administration with accurate information regarding the number of expected participants, which contributed to the violence. He claimed that if VHP and BJP had given a more accurate number, law enforcement would have been adequately prepared and had backup ready.

== Alleged involvement of MLA Mamman Khan ==
At a meeting of the Haryana Legislative Assembly in February 2023, Mamman Khan, the legislative representative for Ferozepur Jhirka, displayed photographs depicting acts of violence allegedly committed by Monu Manesar. During Khan's remarks, he implied that Manesar would be met with violence if he returned to the Nuh area.This speech was not considered of any major significance until the riots took place in July.

Haranya Home Minister Anil Vij accused Khan of instigating the violence in Nuh and indicated that Khan was wanted for police questioning in connection with alleged communications with known rioters.Vij also stated that violence took place in areas that were visited by Mamman Khan on July 28–30.

The Chief Minister of Haryana, Manohar Lal Khattar, also indirectly alluded to Mamman Khan, stating that some Congress MLAs were implicated in the violence and added that absence of a response from the opposition party was "suspicious."

A day before the violence in Nuh, it was also alleged that Mamman Khan had posted on ‘X’, formerly Twitter, "The people of Mewat need not panic, fought for you in the assembly, will fight here too." The tweet was later deleted. Mamman Khan was called in front of the Nagina village's Special Investigation Team for an investigation into his involvement in the riots. However, he failed to appear. The DSP of Ferozepur Jhirka and the head of the Special Investigation Team reportedly said that he would send Mamman Khan a second notice and call him to join the investigation. After avoiding the team twice, Mamman Khan was eventually arrested on September 15, 2023, on charges including promoting enmity between different groups (IPC §153-A) and mischief by fire or explosive substance with intent to destroy property (§436). Mamman Khan was released on interim bail on October 3, 2023, and was then released on regular bail on October 18, 2023.

In February 2024, 6 months after the Nuh violence, Mamman Khan was additionally charged under the Unlawful Activities (Prevention) Act, a controversial anti-terror law that critics characterize as "draconian" and unevenly applied. The UAPA makes it extremely difficult to obtain bail, leaving suspects imprisoned for years awaiting trial. The decision to charge Khan under UAPA was heavily opposed by Bhupinder Singh Hooda and other members of the Indian National Congress, who alleged that the charges were politically motivated, arguing that no new information had been uncovered that would justify additional charges.

== See also ==
- 2002 Gujarat riots
- 2017 Northern India riots
- 2020 Delhi riots
- 2020 Bangalore riots
- 2023 Manipur violence
- List of massacres in India
