= List of incidents of cow vigilante violence in India =

Cow vigilante violence refers to violence against those who are perceived to engage in cattle theft or slaughter. It is seen mainly in India, where cows are considered sacred to the Hindu majority. Many of the lynchings have been attributed to cow vigilantes who have taken it upon themselves to enforce laws against cow slaughter. In some states, the protection of cows, which are considered sacred in Hinduism, has been a significant issue, leading to violent actions against those suspected of harming or consuming cows.

== Summary ==
A number of incidents of violence have occurred. According to a June 2017 Reuters report, citing a data journalism website, a total of "28 Indians – 24 of them Muslims – have been killed and 124 injured since 2010 in cow-related violence". The frequency and severity of cow-related violence have been described as "unprecedented". The report stated that, "Almost all of the 63 attacks since 2010 involving cow-related violence were recorded after Modi and his Hindu nationalist government came to power in 2014".

== Targeting of minorities ==
A significant number of the victims of these lynchings have been Muslims, as well as Dalits (members of the lowest caste in India's traditional hierarchy). This has raised concerns about rising religious and caste-based intolerance.

== Before 1800s ==
Cow slaughter has been punishable by death in many instances in Indian history. Under the Scindia of Gwalior state, people were executed for killing cows.

The "Holi Riot" of 1714 in Gujarat was in part cow-related. A Hindu had attempted to start the spring festivities of Holi by burning a public Holika bonfire, a celebration that his Muslim neighbors objected to. The Muslims retaliated by slaughtering a cow in front of Hindu's house. The Hindus gathered, attacked the Muslims, seized the Muslim butcher's son and killed him. The Muslims, aided by the Afghan army, sacked the neighborhood, which led Hindus across the city to retaliate. Markets and homes were burnt down. Many Hindus and Muslims died during the Holi riot. The cycle of violence continued for a few days devastating the neighborhoods in Ahmedabad. The cow-related violence and riots repeated in the years that followed, though the only documented 18th-century riots in Ahmedabad are of 1714.

== 19th century ==
According to Mark Doyle, the first cow protection societies on the Indian subcontinent were started by Kukas [Namdharis], a reformist group seeking to return Sikhism to the Hindu religion and rejecting core Sikh values such as not worshipping idols and animals. The Namdharis were agitating for cow protection after the British annexed Punjab. In 1871, as stated by Peter van der Veer, Namdharis killed Muslim butchers of cows in Amritsar and Ludhiana, and viewed cow protection as a "sign of the moral quality of the state". According to Barbara Metcalf and Thomas Metcalf, Namdharis were agitating for the well-being of cows in the 1860s, and their ideas spread to Hindu reform movements.

According to Judith Walsh, widespread cow protection riots occurred repeatedly in British India in the 1880s and 1890s. These were observed in regions of Punjab, United Provinces, Bihar, Bengal, Bombay Presidency and in parts of South Myanmar (Rangoon). The anti-cow killing riots of 1893 in Punjab caused the death of at least 100 people. The 1893 cow killing riots started during the Muslim festival of Bakr-Id, the riot repeated in 1894, and they were the largest riots in British India after the 1857 revolt.

Riots triggered by cow-killings erupted in Lahore, Ambala, Delhi, United Provinces, Bihar and other places in the late 19th century. In Bombay alone, several hundred people were killed or injured in cow-related violence in 1893, according to Hardy. One of the issues, states Walsh, in these riots was "the Muslim slaughter of cows for meat, particularly as part of religious festivals such as Bakr-Id". The cow protection-related violence were a part of larger communal riots, religious disputes, and class conflicts during the colonial era.

Elsewhere in 1893, there were riots in Azamgarh and Mau, in eastern Uttar Pradesh. The Azamgarh riots were born out of administrative disputes regarding cow slaughter. Reportedly an inexperienced British officer (Henry Dupernex) ordered Muslims to register with the police, if they wished to slaughter cows for Eid al-Adha. Many of the Muslims interpreted the order as an invitation to sacrifice.

In the town of Mau, there were riots in 1806, states John McLane, that had led to Sadar Nizamat Adawlat to prohibit cow sacrifices in 1808. The Hindus had interpreted this to mean a prohibition to all cattle slaughter. In the early 19th-century, the prohibition was enforced in a manner that the Hindus could interpret it. In the 1860s, the interpretation was changed to a Muslim version wherein cattle sacrifice was banned in 1808, but not cattle slaughter. As stated by McLane, this triggered intense dissatisfaction among Hindus. Mau, with nearly half of its population being Muslim, resisted Hindu interpretation. When a "local Muslim zamindar (landowner) insisted on sacrificing an animal for his daughter's wedding", a group of local Hindus gathered to object, according to McLane. Four thousand men from Ballia district and two thousand from Ghazipur district joined the Hindus in Mau to stop the sacrifice in 1893. They were apparently motivated by the belief that cows had not been killed in Mau since Akbar's time, but the British were now changing the rules to allow cow killing in new locations. The cow-protecting Hindus attacked the Muslims and looted a bazaar in Mau. The British officials estimated seven Muslims were killed in the riots, while locals placed the toll at 200.

== 20th century ==
Cattle protection-related violence continued in the first half of the 20th century. Examples of serious cow protection agitation and riots include the 1909 Calcutta riot after Muslims sacrificed a cow in public, the 1912 Faizabad riots after a Maulvi taunted a group of Hindus about a cow he was with, the 1911 Muzaffarpur riot when in retribution for cow slaughter by Muslims, the Hindus threatened to desecrate a mosque. In 1916 and 1917, over the Muslim festival of Eid-ul-Adha, two riots broke out in Patna with widespread rioting, looting and murders in major cities of Bihar. The British officials banned cow slaughter during Muslim Id festival of sacrifice. According to British colonial records, Hindu crowds as large as 25,000 attacked Muslims on Id day, violence broke out at multiple sites simultaneously, and civil authorities were unable to cope with. Many serious anti cow slaughter and cow protection-related riots broke out between 1917 and 1928 across India particularly on Muslim festival of sacrifice, from Punjab through Delhi to Orissa, leading to the arrests of hundreds.

In the 1920s, over 100 riots, 450 deaths and 5,000 injuries were recorded in Bengal which was divided in 1947 into East Pakistan and West Bengal. Two primary causes of the violence, states Nitish Sengupta, were Hindus Durga Puja processions playing music which continued as they passed near Muslim mosques, and Muslims killing cows in open during Eid-ul-Adha.

In 1946, rumors spread in Bengal that Hindus had secretly conspired to stop cow sacrifice on Eid-ul-Adha by bringing in Sikhs and arms into their homes. On the day of the Islamic festival of sacrifice (September 1946), states Batabyal, the rumor spread among the Bengali Muslims congregated in mosques. The crowd coming out of the mosques then raided a large number of Hindu homes trying to find the arms and the Sikhs. Violence continued for about a week with "frequent instances of stray killings" and looting.

After the 1947 Partition of the Indian subcontinent into Pakistan and India, frequent riots and fatal violence broke in newly created India over cow slaughter. Between 1948 and 1951, cow slaughter led to a spate of riots broke out in Azamgarh, Akola, Pilbhit, Katni, Nagpur, Aligarh, Dhubri, Delhi and Calcutta. Riots triggered by slaughter of cows continued in rural and urban locations of India in the 1950s and 1960s. According to Ian Copland and other scholars, it was the practical stop of cow sacrifice ritual as Islamic festivals after 1947 that largely led to a reduction in riots from the peak observed just before India's independence. The riots, the add, re-emerged in the 1960s, when a new generation of Muslims born after the independence reached adolescence, who were less aware of the trauma of religious violence in India of the 1940s, began to assert their rights.

In 1966, 100 members of the Indian parliament signed a petition for a nationwide ban on cow slaughter. Hindu sadhus (monks) gathered in Delhi to protest against cow slaughter, launched gau-raksha (cow protection) agitation and demanded a ban. During a huge procession that was walking towards the parliament to press their demand, before they could reach the parliament, some people began a disturbance and rioting started. These riots killed eight people. Indira Gandhi, the newly nominated Prime Minister, continued her father's policy of no national ban on cow slaughter.

== 21st century ==
=== 2002 ===
In 2002, five Dalit youths were killed by a mob in Jhajjar district, Haryana after accusations of cow slaughter. The mob were reportedly led by members of the Vishva Hindu Parishad, according to Human Rights Watch. According to People's Union for Democratic Rights, the Vishva Hindu Parishad and the Gauraksha Samiti have defended violent vigilantism around cow protection as sentiments against the "sin of cow-slaughter" and not related to "the social identity of the victims". Various groups, such as the families of the Dalits victims of cow-related violence in 2002, did not question the legitimacy of cow protection but questioned instead the false allegations.

=== 2005 ===
In March 2005, a Muslim cattle trader and his son, Hajabba and Hasanabba were stripped and assaulted in the outskirts of Udupi by a cow vigilante.

=== 2012 ===
Date	Location	Dead	Injured	Description
10 June 2012	Joga, Punjab	0	2	Villagers led by activists of the Vishva Hindu Parishad and the Goshala Sangh, set a factory and two houses on fire following reports of cow slaughter in factory premises.

=== 2013 ===
Date	Location	Dead	Injured	Description
20 August 2013	Chandan Nagar, Indore, Madhya Pradesh		35	Communal tensions rise over recovery of cow carcass; 35 including 25 policemen, were injured.
30 August 2013	Rewari, Haryana			Mobs on a rampage at two places in the state; torch 65 vehicles, attack police after intercepting trucks carrying cattle and cow flesh. State-owned buses, 50 police and other vehicles set on fire.

=== 2014 ===
Date	Location	Dead	Injured	Description
14 August 2014	Haryana	0	2	Muslim meat sellers beaten up in the Delhi border.
23 August 2014	Pumpwell, Karnataka		3	Three men were transporting 13 cattle when a drunk mob attacked them.
7 October 2014	Gujarat	0	5	Alleged cow slaughter; police and Muslims clashed.
8 October 2014	Bihar	0	1	Rumors of beef related issues on the occasion of Bakr-Id that led to communal tensions.
11 October 2014	Bihar	0	2	Following rumors of a severed cow head being found at a temple across the town, communal tensions arose in Kishanganj.

=== 2015 ===
Date	Location	Dead	Injured	Description
30 May 2015	Rajasthan	1		A 60-year-old man who ran a meat shop was beaten to death by a mob with sticks and iron rods.
2 August 2015	Uttar Pradesh	3		According to Human Rights Watch, "purported animal rights activists allegedly belonging to People for Animals" beat three men to death, after the victims were found carrying buffaloes.
28 September 2015	Bisahda village, Dadri, Uttar Pradesh	1	1	A mob of villagers attacked the home of a Muslim man Mohammed Akhlaq, with sticks and bricks, who they suspected of stealing and slaughtering a stolen cow calf, in Bisahda village near Dadri, Uttar Pradesh. 52 year-old Mohammad Akhlaq Saifi (Ikhlaq according to some sources) died in that attack and his son, 22-year-old Danish was seriously injured.
9 October 2015	Jammu and Kashmir	1		A right-wing Hindu mob in Udhampur district threw gasoline bombs at an 18-year-old trucker. The mob had incorrectly suspected the trucker of transporting beef.
14 October 2015	Himachal Pradesh	1	4	A mob beat a 22-year old to death, and injured four others, after suspecting them of transporting cows. Police immediately arrested the victims of the attack, accusing them of cow slaughter. Later police said they would investigate if Bajrang Dal was behind the attack.
9 December 2015	Bhanukeri Village, Karnal, Haryana	1		One killed as cow vigilante group opens fire at 40 migrant workers.

=== 2016 ===
Date	Location	Dead	Injured	Description
14 January 2016	Madhya Pradesh	0	2	A Muslim couple was beaten up inside a train by members of Gau Raksha Samithi in the Khikriya railway station in Harda, Madhya Pradesh, on suspicion of carrying a bag containing beef.
18 March 2016	Jharkhand	2		In the Jharkhand lynching, two Muslim cattle traders were attacked, allegedly by cattle-protection vigilantes in the Balumath forests of the Latehar district in Jharkhand. The attackers killed Mazlum Ansari, aged 32, and Imteyaz Khan, aged 15, who were found hanging from a tree.
11 July 2016	Gujarat	0	4	A group of six men attacked four Dalit men after finding them skinning a dead cow. The four were chained to a car, stripped, and beaten with iron rods.
17 July 2016	Karnataka	0	4	4 Dalits including a physically challenged person were beaten up by Bajrang Dal activists in Chikkamagalur district of Karnataka on suspicion of eating beef.
30 July 2016	Uttar Pradesh			A Muslim family was attacked by a mob on allegation of cow slaughter in Muzaffarnagar, Uttar Pradesh. The victims were arrested on charges of cow slaughter but no case was registered against the members of the mob.

=== 2017 ===
Date	Location	Dead	Injured	Description
5 April 2017	Rajasthan	1	6	In the Alwar lynching, Pehlu Khan, a dairy farmer from Nuh district of Haryana, was murdered by a group of 200 cow vigilantes affiliated with right-wing Hindutva groups in Alwar, Rajasthan, India. Six others who were with Pehlu Khan were also beaten by the cow vigilantes. The state government initially charged the victims with "cruelty to animals" under the state law prohibiting cattle slaughter.
20 April 2017	Assam	2		Two men, in their 20s, were allegedly killed by a mob of cow vigilantes, after being accused of trying to steal cows for slaughter.
24 April 2017	Jammu and Kashmir	0	5	A family of five, including a 9-year old girl, were attacked and injured; police arrested 11 so-called cow vigilantes in connection with the attack. A video of the attack showed the assailants demolishing the shelter of the family; policemen were visible in the video, apparently unable to intervene.
23 April 2017	Delhi	0	3	Three men transporting buffaloes were injured after being beaten by a group stating they were members of the animal rights activist group People for Animals.
23 June 2017	Delhi-Ballabhgarh train	1	3	Four Muslims were lynched allegedly over rumors of eating beef. According to the police, the victims had arguments over meat with their co-passengers who attacked them with knives.
1 May 2017	Assam	2		Two Muslim men were lynched in Nagaon district of Assam on suspicion of stealing cows. While the police managed to rescue the men, both of them died of their injuries.
12 May 2017 – 18 May 2017	Jharkhand	9	2	At least nine people were killed, including 4 Muslim cattle traders, in four different incidents.
22 June 2017	West Bengal	3		Three Muslim men were lynched in Islampur, Uttar Dinajpur for allegedly trying to steal cows. A police complaint was made by the mother of the deceased Nasir Haque. According to the Superintendent of Police Amit Kumar Bharat Rathod, the police arrested 3 people and were conducting further investigation.
27 June 2017	Jharkhand	0	1	Usman Ansari, a 55-year-old Muslim dairy owner, was beaten up and his house set on fire by a mob in Giridih district. According to the police, a headless carcass of a cow was found near his house. The police said that they were forced to perform a lathi-charge, and to fire in the air, to rescue the victim, who was later treated in the hospital.
29 June 2017	Jharkhand	1		Alimuddin, alias Asgar Ansari, was beaten to death by a mob in the village of Bajartand, allegedly for carrying beef. According to Additional Director General of police RK Mallik, the murder was premeditated.
10 November 2017	Alwar, Rajasthan	1	2	Two cattle traders named Ummar Khan and Tahir Khan were allegedly thrashed and fired at by cow vigilantes. Ummar died on the spot due to bullet wounds, while Tahir was admitted to hospital.

=== 2018 ===
Date	Location	Dead	Injured	Description
13 June 2018	Dullu, Jharkhand	2		Sirabuddin Ansari (35) and Murtaza Ansari (30) lynched in Jharkhand over alleged cattle theft.
14 June 2018	Bareilly, Uttar Pradesh	1		A meat seller thrashed by UP police for 'cow slaughter' who later died in AIIMS.
20 June 2018	Hapur, Uttar Pradesh	1		45-year-old Qasim lynched in UP over a cow slaughter rumour. This incident was at the center of a sting operation conducted by NDTV. The Chief Justice of India agreed to hear the case based on the sting operation footage.
20 July 2018	Rajasthan	1		31 year old Rakbar Khan was lynched by a mob on allegation of cattle smuggling in Alwar, Rajasthan. A police officer was suspended for delaying medical treatment to the victim as he tried to arrange shelter for the cows before taking injured Rakbar to the hospital.
30 August 2018	Lakshmanpur village, Balrampur, Uttar Pradesh	0	1	70-year old Kailash Nath Shukla was taking his cattle to another village for treatment, when on his way a mob stopped him and assaulted him badly and threw him in a gutter.
3 December 2018	Bulandshahr, Uttar Pradesh	2		A protest against illegal cow slaughter erupted into riots resulting in the death of two; a police officer named Subodh Kumar Singh and a protesting youth. Chief Minister Yogi Adityanath described the violence as an 'accident' and denied the occurrence of lynchings in Uttar Pradesh even though the DGP hinted about the possibility of a larger conspiracy behind the incident aimed at inciting communal violence in the area.

=== 2019 ===
Date	Location	Dead	Injured	Description
7 April 2019	Bishwanath Chariali, Assam		1	A Muslim man was harassed, humiliated, insulted and beaten by the mobs over beef. The mob suspected 68-year-old Shaukat Ali of selling beef and cornered him, thrashed him, and proceeded to force-feed him pork.
11 April 2019	Gumla, Jharkhand	1	3	A 50-year-old Christian man was killed and three other were assaulted and beaten by a mob.
16 May 2019	Bhaderwah, Jammu and Kashmir	1	2	A Muslim man, Nayeem Ahmed Shah, 50, was shot in the head and died on the spot while another, Yasin Hussain, was injured by "cow vigilantes" over cow-smuggling while families of both denied any animal was carried out by any of them. Soon after the killings protests erupted, with protesters demanding justice while damaging five vehicles, setting afire a three-wheeler. Police used batons, tear gas and imposed curfew to prevent the religious riots. Police arrested two people in connection with the arson incident and 7 were detained for questioning.
22 May 2019	Seoni, Madhya Pradesh		4	A couple and two men were thrashed by a group of vigilantes for allegedly carrying beef in an auto-rickshaw at a village in Madhya Pradesh. In a video of the incident shot by an eyewitness on a mobile phone, the assailants also forced one of the men to beat up the woman accompanying them. The woman was seen being hit repeatedly with a slipper on the head and covered with a piece of cloth, as she curled up on the gravel and endured the blows in silence from the attacker. The police learned of the incident after "two" days that was also only because of viral videos on Twitter and other social media sites. Police arrested both suspects and victims as according to police, victims did not sustain any "serious" injuries and the cow vigilantes had informed them that victims were allegedly carrying 150 kg of red meat in an auto rickshaw and a two-wheeler from Khairi village. Police seized the meat, the three-wheeler and the scooter and sent them to Judicial Custody for allegedly carrying red meat as possession, transportation or sale of beef is illegal in Madhya Pradesh. Five suspects were also arrested under IPC Sections 143, 148, 149, 341, 294, 323 and 506 and also Section 25 of the Arms Act. The incident and the behavior of the police faced wide condemnation and backlash by some Indian politicians and people.
1 June 2019	Bareilly, Uttar Pradesh		4	Four including two Muslim labourers were beaten by Mob for allegedly eating meat. Surviving labourers said they were eating vegetarian food. Police started their investigation to arrest the attackers.
3 June 2019	Bhabhua, Bihar		1	The driver of a truck carrying bones was attacked by a mob. Police reached the spot on time and rescued him from lynching. Cow vigilantes opposed the police action and demanded they hand over the driver, also threatening the police officer would be removed from service and face dire consequences.
25 June 2019	Gurgaon, Haryana		2	Two men were beaten and thrashed by cow vigilantes in Gurgaon, Haryana. The men were admitted to a civil government hospital in Gurugram and later referred to Rohtak Medical College.
18 July 2019	Baniapur, Bihar	3		Three men were lynched and beaten by a mob and got referred to a hospital at Chhapra, where doctors on inspection declared them as dead.
9 August 2019	Greater Noida, Uttar Pradesh		1	A driver was assaulted by five persons, including a woman, where they broke the windows of the vehicle, overturned it and disrupted traffic, but were later arrested by the police. The driver was transporting carcasses of dead cattle to a disposal plant in Chhajarsi village but the cow vigilantes were spreading fake news about cow slaughter to the crowd which created a ruckus.
23 September 2019	Khunti, Jharkhand	1	2	Three tribal men were beaten by Bajrang dal people on the suspicion of selling beef in Khunti. Among three, one was dead.
21 November 2019	Cooch Behar	2		Thirteen people were arrested for their alleged involvement in the lynching of two men on suspicion of cattle smuggling in West Bengal's Cooch Behar district.

=== 2020 ===
Date	Location	Dead	Injured	Description
15 June 2020	Mangalore, Karnataka	0	1	The driver identified as Mohd Hanif, was tied to the tempo on which he was carrying the cattle and was beaten by a mob of cow vigilantes by the roadside. The vigilantes also damaged the tempo. Reportedly, the men belonged to Bajrang Dal.

=== 2021 ===
Date	Location	Dead	Injured	Description
23 May 2021	Moradabad, Uttar Pradesh	0	1	Mohammad Shakir was allegedly transporting buffalo meat on a scooter when a group stopped him and demanded ₹50,000 from him. Afterwards, he was beaten with sticks. The police later filed an FIR against the victim.
4 June 2021	Mathura, Uttar Pradesh	1	7	A 50-year-old truck driver, identified as Mohammad Shera, was shot dead and his seven associates were assaulted by a mob alleging that the victims were smuggling cows.
12 June 2021	Tinsukia, Assam	1		28-year-old Sarat Moran was tied in an open field and killed by a mob which suspected him of attempting to steal a cow from a cowshed.
14 June 2021	Chittorgarh, Rajasthan	1	1	Babu Bheel and his associate were carrying bulls in a truck and were assaulted by suspected cow vigilantes with sticks and other weapons. According to preliminary investigation, the bulls were purchased for farm use.
23 June 2021	Jammu and Kashmir	1	2	

=== 2023 ===
Date	Location	Dead	Injured	Description
07 Mar 2023	Chhapra	1	1	A 47-year old man and his nephew were attacked by sharp objects and lynched in Chhapra, Bihar on the suspicion of carrying beef.
10 June 2023	Nashik	1		A 23-year-old man named Lukman Ansari was reportedly lynched by a group of cow vigilantes, commonly known as ‘gau rakshaks,’ in Maharashtra's Nashik district.
16 Feb 2023	Bhiwani district	2	2	2023 Bhiwani killings: Nasir (age 25) and Junaid (age 35), residents of Bharatpur district were allegedly kidnapped and subsequently killed by cow vigilantes affiliated with the Bajrang Dal in Haryana.

=== 2024 ===
Date	Location	Dead	Injured	Description
7 June 2024	Raipur, Chhattisgarh	3		A Hindutva mob attacked and lynched cattle transporters, leaving two dead on the spot and one after 10 days.
15 June 2024	Medak, Telegana		12	Hindutva vigilante groups attacked and protested cattle transporters, leaving 12 people injured.
23 Aug 2024	Faridabad, Haryana	1		A class 12 student, Aryan Mishra was killed by 5 men after they mistook him for buying beef .
27 Aug 2024	Charkhi Dadri, Haryana	1	2	A mob attacked ragpickers in Hansawas Khurd village and alleged that they were consuming beef. Sabir Malik, a 26-year-old migrant worker from West Bengal was allegedly beaten to death while his uncle Aseeruddin survived after escaping.
30 Aug 2024	Igatpuri Nashik district		1	A 72-year old, Haji Ashraf Munyar, a resident of Jalgaon district, who was travelling to his daughter's house in Kalyan, was allegedly assaulted by his co-passengers in an express train on suspicion that he was carrying beef.

== Statistics ==
Incidents statistics by year
Year	Incidents	Total number killed	Total number wounded
2012	1		2
2013	2		35
2014	5		13
2015	6	8	5
2016	5	2	10
Jan 2017–June 2017	11	18	20
2012–June 2017 Reuters report	30	28	124
29 June 2017– December 2017	2	2	1
2018	6	7	1
2019	10	6	18
2020	1	0	1
2022	0	0	0
2023	1	0	1
2024	5	4	12
Total	83	43	157
