= Mehdi Hasan (disambiguation) =

Mehdi Hasan (born 1979) is a British-American journalist.

Mehdi Hasan, Mehdi Hassan, Mahdi Hasan, or other similar spellings, may also refer to:

- Mehdi Hasan (Pakistani journalist) (1937–2022)
- Mehdi Hasan (cricketer, born 1990), Indian cricketer
- Mehdi Hasan (diplomat), Bangladeshi diplomat
- Mehdi Hasan Khan, Bangladeshi software developer
- Mahdi Hasan (1936–2013), Indian anatomist
- Mehdi Hassan (1927–2012), Pakistani ghazal singer
- Mohamed Mehdi Hasan (born 1971), Bangladeshi Olympic sprinter

== See also ==
- Mehedi Hasan (disambiguation)
- Mehdi Hasan Aini Qasmi, Indian Islamic scholar and social activist
- Mehdi Hassan Bhatti (born 1955), Pakistani politician
- Mahdi Hasan Shahjahanpuri (1882–1976), Indian Islamic scholar
