= 2017 Pratapgarh lynching =

The 2017 Pratapgarh lynching refers to death of Zafar Khan, a political activist and member of Communist Party of India (Marxist-Leninist) based in the Pratapgarh district of Rajasthan on 16 June 2017 when he tried to stop 5 employees of the Pratapgarh municipality from taking pictures of women defecating in public. This is the second lynching case in Rajasthan after the killing of a Muslim dairy farmer by cow protection vigilantes in April 2017.

== Incident ==
On Friday morning municipal employees were allegedly on a tour to photograph people defecating in the open. The event occurred near Bagwasa Kachi basti when 55 year old Zafar Khan allegedly objected and tried to stop the municipal staff from taking photographs and videos of women defecating in the open. According to the municipality including by way of a video released by it, Khan abused the workers, threatened to kill them and assaulted one of them. A fight ensued in which as mentioned in the police complaint by Khan's brother Noor Mohammad, Khan was beaten up including with a stick. He was declared dead when rushed to the nearest hospital. Khan it is reported had petitioned for private toilets. According to one woman, civic employees, over a period of four days, urged those indulging in open defecation to use public toilets. Pratapgarh municipal commissioner Ashok Jain denied attacking Khan and his team taking photographs to shame people. According to some eyewitnesses, the municipal staff yelled kill him referring to Zafar Khan.

== Aftermath ==
After this incident, local people along with the family members of the deceased gathered at the mortuary where Khan's body was kept and blocked NH 113 for several hours. They demanded compensation & arrest of the municipal employees. Some Muslim organisations alleged that the administration was trying to conceal the matter.

Pratapagarh police has registered a FIR against Kamal Harijan, Ritesh Harijan, Manish Harijan, municipal commissioner Ashok Jain and others following a police complaint by the relatives of Khan.
