= Mehdi Hasan Aini Qasmi =

Indian Islamic scholar and activist

- مہدی حسن عینی قاسمی
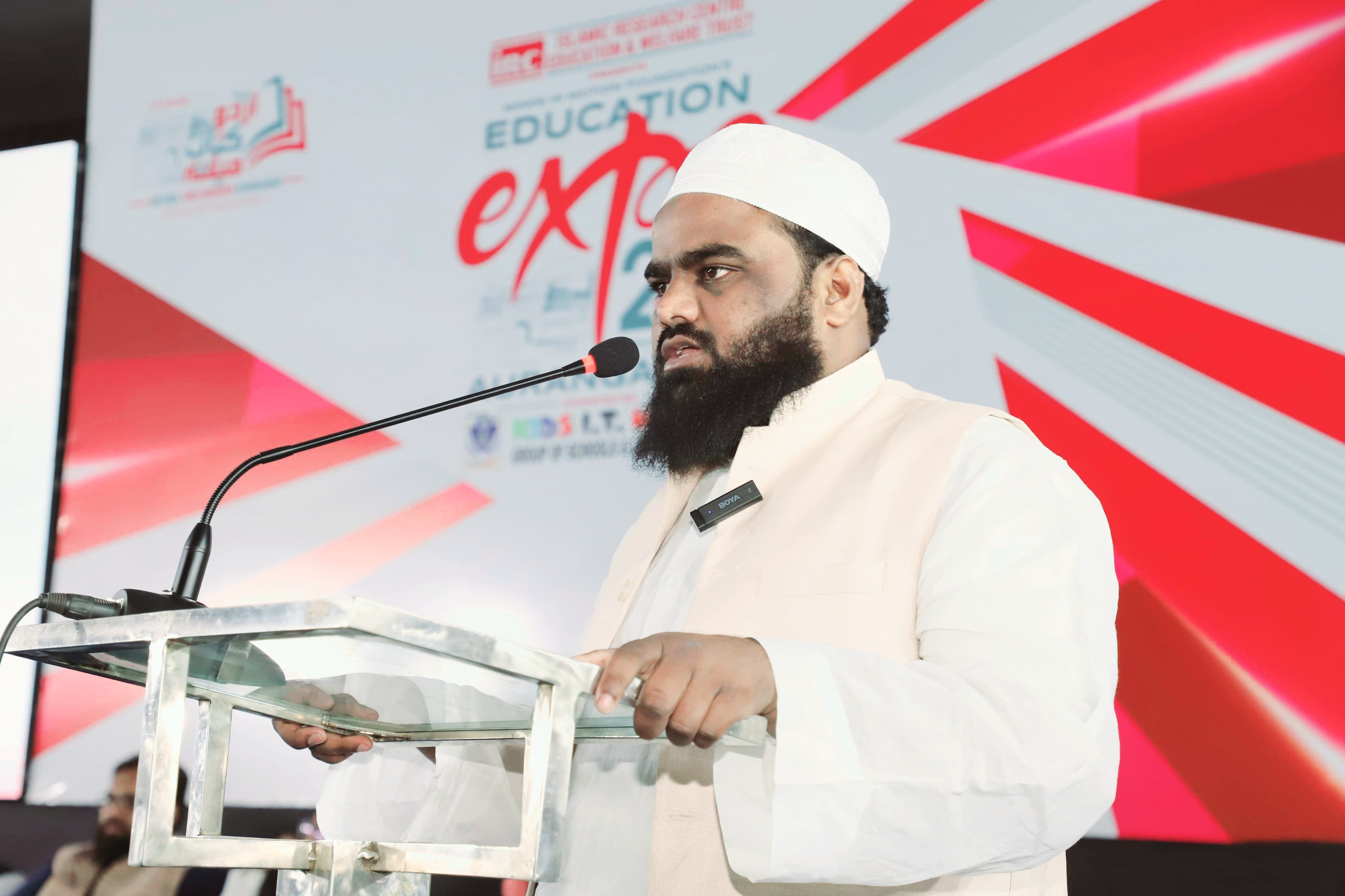
- Qasmi at Education Expo 2023
- Born: Nasirabad, Raebareli, Uttar Pradesh, India
- Education: Darul Uloom Deoband
- Occupations: Islamic scholar, social activist
- Organization(s): India Islamic Academy, Deoband
- Known for: Religious education, social reform, activism

Mehdi Hasan Aini Qasmi is an Indian Islamic scholar and social activist. He is the founder and director of India Islamic Academy, Deoband, and the president of Tanzeem Abna E Madaris, Deoband. He has been active in religious education, humanitarian efforts, and social reform. His work includes advocacy for madrasa education, campaigns for simple and affordable weddings, and COVID-19 relief initiatives. He has also been involved in media-related activism and discussions on the political challenges faced by marginalized communities in India.

== Biography ==
Mehdi Hasan Aini Qasmi, originally from Nasirabad, Raebareli, Uttar Pradesh, completed the Aalim and Faazil programs and earned a postgraduate degree in Islamic Science from Darul Uloom Deoband.

He is the Founder & Director of India Islamic Academy, Deoband (IIAD) and serves as the President of the Deoband Alumni Federation and Tanzeem Abna E Madaris.

He is also associated with the Abna-e-Madaris Welfare Educational Trust and the Social Reform Committee (UP) under the All India Muslim Personal Law Board.

== Career and activities ==
=== Academic discourse ===
Qasmi has discussed madrasa education in India, stating that its prevalence increased after the exclusion of Islamic education during British rule, leading to the establishment of independent religious institutions. He believes that madrasas played a role in resisting colonialism, citing Darul Uloom Deoband as an example. Additionally, he highlights that many madrasas provide free education, making them accessible to students from lower-income backgrounds.

He has also delivered lectures on contemporary ideological challenges. At Education Expo 2023, he discussed various global intellectual movements, including liberalism, secularism, capitalism, and feminism, as well as Indian ideologies like Hindutva and nationalism. He stressed the need for scholars and youth to engage intellectually with these issues.

=== Relief work ===
During the COVID-19 pandemic, Qasmi played a significant role in providing aid to affected communities. He and his team established a helpdesk that arranged hospital beds, oxygen cylinders, and free medical counseling. They also worked to counter misinformation about the disease, assisting over 5,000 people and arranging more than 2,000 oxygen cylinders and medicines.

Additionally, he led large-scale relief efforts, distributing over 200,000 ration kits and meals. He collaborated with medical institutions and welfare organizations to set up a COVID-19 help desk, which provided medical supplies and facilitated hospital admissions for over 150 patients.

=== Social reforms ===
Qasmi has actively campaigned for simple and affordable weddings, opposing extravagant expenses. As a member of the Social Reform Committee of the All India Muslim Personal Law Board (AIMPLB), he promotes the Aasaan wa Masnoon Nikah campaign, which encourages simple weddings and discourages dowry practices.

In February 2019, he led a delegation to areas affected by toxic liquor, meeting with affected families and discussing measures to prevent alcohol consumption in local communities.

In December 2019, he participated in a candlelight march in Deoband following the Hyderabad incident, calling for stricter legal measures against perpetrators. The protest also included a signature campaign and a memorandum to the President, Prime Minister, and National Commission for Women and Child Development.

In November 2019, ahead of the Ayodhya verdict, Qasmi commended the administration’s efforts to maintain peace but urged them to engage religious leaders from all communities rather than focusing solely on Muslim scholars. He also called for action against hate speech on social media and the deployment of security forces in sensitive areas.

=== Activism ===
In 2017, following the lynching of Junaid Khan, protests were held across India. Some individuals wore black armbands during Eid al-Fitr prayers as a symbolic gesture against mob violence. Qasmi commented that mob lynching was becoming a serious issue and described the armbands as a peaceful form of protest. He also sought religious guidance from Darul Uloom Deoband regarding the permissibility of wearing black armbands. While no written ruling was issued, some scholars reportedly conveyed over the phone that there was no prohibition on this practice.

In the same year, he initiated an online petition against Zee TV’s program Fatah Ka Fatwa, alleging that it promoted sectarianism. The petition gained significant traction, leading a major sponsor to reconsider its advertisement placement. Additionally, he played a role in filing an FIR against Tarek Fatah for allegedly making derogatory remarks about Islam and Islamic seminaries.

In March 2018, Qasmi criticized statements made by Waseem Rizvi that linked madrasas to terrorism and called for their closure. He filed a formal complaint against Rizvi, alleging that his remarks could incite communal tensions and disrupt public order. Letters were also sent to the Director General of Police (DGP) Uttar Pradesh, the Supreme Court, the Allahabad High Court, and the Senior Superintendent of Police (SSP), urging legal action.

Following the 2019 Pulwama attack, Qasmi and a group of madrasa students organized a candlelight march in Deoband to honor the fallen soldiers. The participants strongly condemned terrorism and called for a comprehensive counterterrorism strategy rather than politicization of such incidents. He also demanded financial compensation for the families of the deceased soldiers.

In December 2019, he participated in a protest against the Citizenship Amendment Act (CAA) in Deoband. The protest, which began at the city's central mosque, was later dispersed by police, who cited a lack of prior permission. Tensions escalated when police attempted to arrest Qasmi, but he persuaded demonstrators to return to their hostels peacefully.

=== Views ===
Qasmi has expressed concerns over the influence of modern ideologies on religious beliefs. He argues that apostasy occurs in stages—first in thoughts, then in culture, and finally in faith. He has particularly spoken about co-educational systems and the role of parents in children's upbringing.

In February 2024, the National Commission for Protection of Child Rights (NCPCR) alleged that a fatwa on Darul Uloom Deoband's website contained content that could incite hatred and requested legal action. Darul Uloom denied issuing any fatwa, stating that it had merely quoted a hadith in response to a religious query. Qasmi criticized the commission, arguing that the issue was being misrepresented and used to portray the institution negatively.

=== Participation in Waqf training workshop (2025) ===
In November 2025, Qasmi participated as a speaker in a training workshop on uploading Waqf documents to the UMEED portal held at Jami'a Zainab lil-Banaat, Deoband. His lecture, titled "The Waqf Law: Its Shariah and Legal Dimensions and Our Responsibilities", addressed legal and religious aspects of the Waqf Act, 2024. He stated that while the Supreme Court of India had provided interim relief on certain provisions of the Act, the process of online registration and documentation through the UMEED portal should continue. He also advised Mutawallis to renew the registration of their respective Waqf properties before 5 December 2025.
