= Mehedi Hasan (disambiguation) =

Mehedi Hasan (born 1997), also known as Mehidy Hasan Miraz, is Bangladeshi cricketer who plays for the Bangladesh national team.

Mehedi Hasan or Mehedi Hassan may also refer to:

- Mehedi Hasan (cricketer, born 2002), Bangladeshi cricketer
- Mehedi Hasan Maruf (born 1988), Bangladeshi cricketer
- Mehedi Hasan Mithu (born 1994), Bangladeshi footballer
- Mehedi Hasan Rana (born 1997), Bangladeshi cricketer
- Mehedi Hasan Royal (born 1996), Bangladeshi footballer
- Mehedi Hasan Srabon (born 2005), Bangladeshi footballer
- Mehedi Hassan Tapu (born 1984), Bangladeshi footballer
- Mehedi Hasan Ujjal (born 1985), Bangladeshi footballer

== See also ==
- Mehdi Hasan (disambiguation)
