= William Lynch speech =

Purported 1712 speech, a hoax

The William Lynch speech, also known as the Willie Lynch letter, is an address purportedly delivered by a William Lynch (or Willie Lynch) to an audience on the bank of the James River in Virginia in 1712 regarding control of slaves within the colony. Since the late 20th century, it has been widely exposed as a hoax.

The letter purports to be a verbatim account of a short speech given by a slave owner, in which he tells other slave masters that he has discovered the "secret" to controlling black slaves by setting them against one another. The document has been in print since at least 1970, but first gained widespread notice in the 1990s, when it appeared on the Internet. Since then, it has often been promoted as an authentic account of slavery during the 18th century, though its inaccuracies and anachronisms have led historians to conclude that it is a hoax.

== Text ==
The reputed author, William Lynch, identifies himself as the master of a "modest plantation" in the British West Indies who has been summoned to the Virginia Colony by local slaveowners to advise them on problems they have been having in managing their slaves.

He briefly notes that their current violent method of handling unruly slaves – lynching, though the term is not used – is inefficient and counterproductive. Instead, he suggests that they adopt his method, which consists of exploiting differences such as age and skin color in order to pit slaves against each other. This method, he assures his hosts, will "control the slaves for at least three hundred years." Some online versions of the text attach introductions, such as a foreword attributed to Frederick Douglass, or citations falsely giving Lynch's name as the source of the word "lynching".

The text of the speech has been published since at least 1970, and is often published with the title "The Making of a Slave". It appeared on the Internet as early as 1993, when a reference librarian at the University of Missouri–St. Louis posted the document on the library's Gopher server. The librarian later revealed that she had obtained the document from the publisher of a local annual business directory, The St. Louis Black Pages in which the narrative had recently appeared.

Though eventually convinced the document was a forgery, the librarian elected to leave it on the Gopher server, as she believed that "even as an inauthentic document, it says something about the former and current state of African America", but added a warning about its provenance.

The text contains numerous anachronisms, including words and phrases such as "refueling" and "fool proof" which were not in use until the early 20th century, while historian Roy Rosenzweig noted the divisions emphasized in the text – skin color, age, and gender – are distinctly 20th-century in nature, making little sense in an 18th-century context. Historians, including Rosenzweig and William Jelani Cobb, have concluded that the William Lynch speech is a modern hoax.

== William Lynch ==
Forewords attached to some online versions of the speech give the narrator's name as the source of the terms "lynching" and "Lynch law", even though the narrator rejects lynching. A man named William Lynch did indeed claim to have originated the term during the American Revolutionary War, but he was born in 1742, thirty years after the alleged delivery of the speech. A document published in the Southern Literary Messenger in 1836 that proposed William Lynch as the originator of "lynch law" may have been a hoax perpetrated by Edgar Allan Poe. A better-documented early use of the term "Lynch law" comes from Charles Lynch, a Virginia justice of the peace and militia officer during the American Revolution.

== Popular references ==
- Nation of Islam leader Louis Farrakhan quoted the speech at the Million Man March in October 1995, making the speech better known in the process. He later cited Willie Lynch's scheme as an obstacle to unite African Americans in his open letter regarding the Millions More Movement in 2005.
- The speech was quoted during the protests surrounding the first inauguration of George W. Bush.
- Ving Rhames's character in the 2005 movie Animal is a gangster who is sent up for a robbery. During his time in prison he meets an activist from Malcolm X's movement, who introduces him to the works of Malcolm X and the William Lynch letter. After deciding to get out of that mindset, he struggles to pull his son out of the same life that got him two prison strikes and tries to get his son to read the Lynch letter.
- Denzel Washington's character quoted extensively from the speech in a scene from the 2007 movie The Great Debaters. This is an anachronism, as the movie is set in the 1930s, nearly 40 years before the letter was "discovered".
- Hip-hop artist Talib Kweli of the rap duo Black Star references the speech in the song "RE:DEFinition" from their critically acclaimed album Mos Def & Talib Kweli Are Black Star: "Still more blacks is dying, kids ain't living they trying, 'How to Make a Slave' by Willie Lynch is still applying"
- Reggae artist Tarrus Riley references Willie Lynch in the title track to his 2006 Parables album, System Set (Willie Lynch Syndrome.)
- Hip-hop artist Xzibit refers to Willie Lynch in his 2012 song "Napalm" from his album Napalm: "Still suffer from the ideology of Willie Lynch."
- Hip-hop artist Kendrick Lamar refers to Willie Lynch in his 2015 song "Complexion (A Zulu Love)" from his third album To Pimp A Butterfly: "Let the Willie Lynch theory reverse a million times."
- Raekwon from the hip-hop group Wu-Tang Clan refers to Willie Lynch in the group's 2014 song "A Better Tomorrow (2014)": "And that's the Willie Lynch tactics that separated the masses. Taught us all to think backwards."
- Queens rapper Nas says "Willie Lynch is a myth" in his 2018 track "Not For Radio" off his 12th studio album Nasir.
- British rapper Durrty Goodz released a track called "Willie Lynch Theory" in 2019.
- Berkeley, California rapper Lil B released the four-part track "Letter to Willie Lynch" in 2020 responding to the speech and the ramifications of the Willie Lynch mindset in 21st century America.
- Hip-hop artist Headie One refers to Willie Lynch in the 2021 song "Don't Judge Me" featuring FKA twigs : "I don't know why me and them oppers started beefin'. Do I blame me, or the Willie Lynch theory?"
