= Animal (2005 film) =

- Film poster
- Directed by: David J. Burke
- Written by: David C. Johnson
- Story by: Ving Rhames
- Produced by: Kip Konwiser
- Starring: Ving Rhames; Terrence Howard; Jim Brown; Chazz Palminteri
- Cinematography: P. J. López
- Edited by: Erik C. Andersen
- Music by: Chris Thomas King
- Release date: October 4, 2005
- Running time: 105 minutes
- Country: United States
- Language: English

Animal is a 2005 direct-to-video film directed by David J. Burke and starring Ving Rhames, Terrence Howard, Chazz Palminteri, and Jim Brown. It was written by David C. Johnson. The film's profits were the subject of a lawsuit against the film's distributor, DEJ Productions. The case was still active into the year 2011. It was followed up by a 2007 sequel, Animal 2. The story of Willie Lynch is mentioned in the film, and passed on from father to son to half-brother. The film holds that the Lynch story is factual although it has been proved to be a modern forgery.

== Cast ==
- Ving Rhames as James "Animal" Allen
- Terrence Howard as Darius Allen
- Chazz Palminteri as Kasada
- Jim Brown as Berwell
- Wes Studi as "Creeper"
- Faizon Love as "Double T"
- Paula Jai Parker as Reecy Allen
- Beverly Todd as Latresse Allen
- Taraji Penda Henson as Ramona
- Kaly Cordova as Prisoner
