= 2017 Alwar mob lynching =

Murder in Alwar, Rajasthan, India

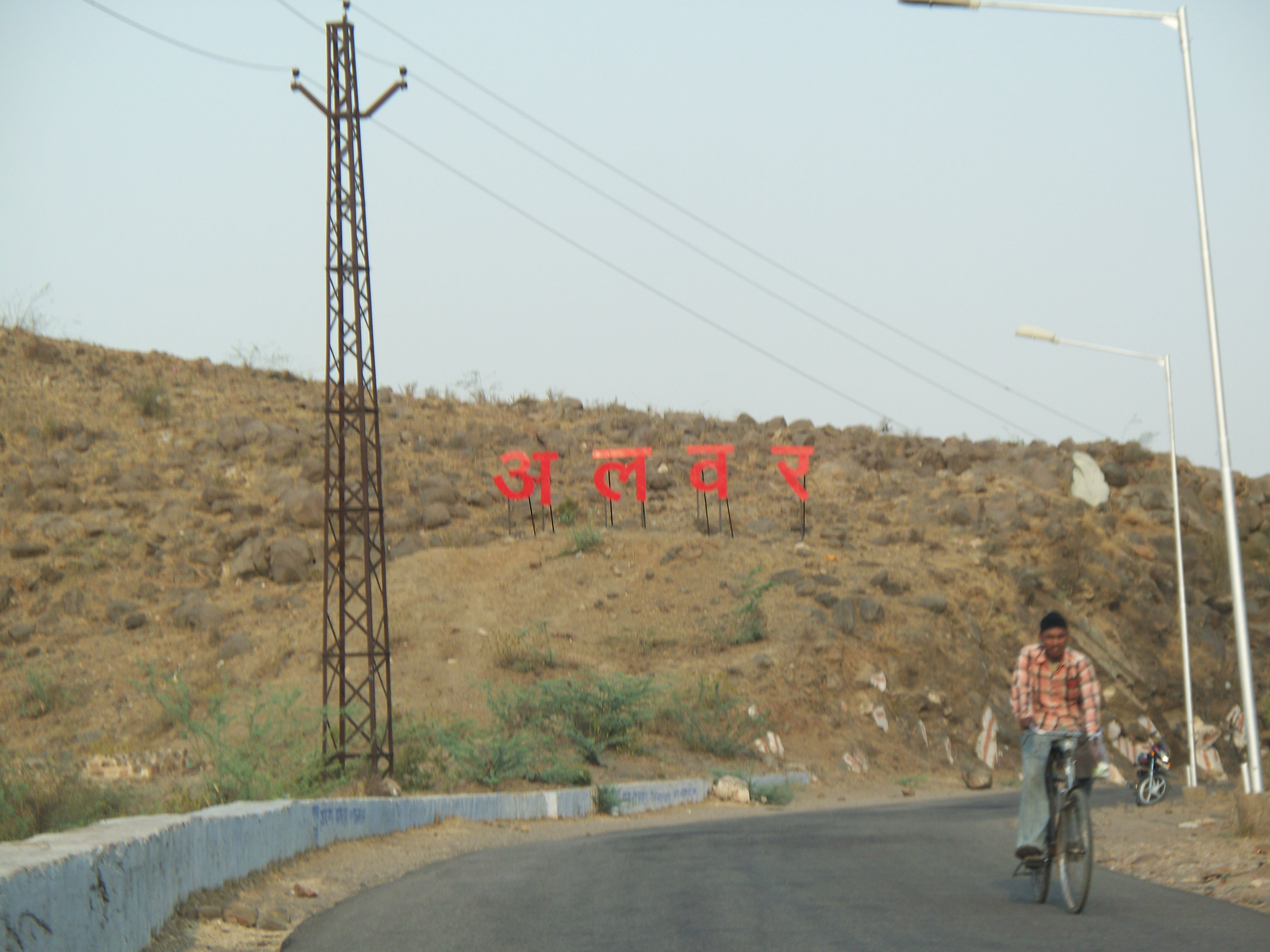
- Outskirts of the Alwar city, 2008

- Alwar (India)
- Location: 27.34°N 76.38°E; Behror, Alwar, Rajasthan, India
- Date: 1 April 2017
- Target: Muslim cattle traders
- Attack type: Lynching
- Deaths: 1
- Injuries: 6
- Perpetrator: Mobs affiliated with right-wing Hindutva groups
- No. of participants: 200

The 2017 Alwar mob lynching was the attack and murder of Pehlu Khan, a dairy farmer from Nuh district of Haryana, allegedly by a group of 200 cow vigilantes affiliated with right-wing Hindutva groups in Behror in Alwar, Rajasthan, India on 1 April 2017. Six others who were with Pehlu Khan were also beaten by the cow vigilantes.

== Background ==
Cows are considered sacred in Hinduism and several Indian states ban their slaughter including Haryana, the home state of the victim, and Rajasthan, where the lynching took place. There have been instances of cattle theft in India and several Hindu vigilante groups have arisen, especially during the administration of the Hindu nationalist Bharatiya Janata Party, in the name of protecting cattle from theft. These vigilante groups have extrajudicially targeted people suspected of cattle smuggling, though most victims of such violence have been Muslim livestock traders. At the time of the attack, Rajasthan and the neighboring state of Haryana were ruled by the Bharatiya Janata Party, and cow vigilante groups were particularly active in these states.

== Incident ==
The victim was Pehlu Khan, a 55-year old resident Jaisinghpur village, in Nuh tehsil of Mewat. On 31 March, he left his village for Jaipur to purchase dairy cattle. Khan was one of only 10 dairy farmers in his village, and he was hoping to increase milk production for the upcoming holy month of Ramadan.

On 1 April, Khan, along with six others, was returning from Jaipur to his village in Nuh, Haryana, carrying cows and calves. They were allegedly stopped near Jaguwas crossing near Behror at the Jaipur-Delhi national highway by 200 cow vigilantes. Khan showed a Jaipur civic document as proof the cows had been bought for milk. According to Irshad, the son of Pehlu Khan who was with him, "We had all the relevant papers to show that we were carrying the cows for dairy farming. We showed them the receipt of sale and purchase. But they were in no mood to listen to us. They tore our documents and attacked my father in front of my eyes."

Despite the documentation, Khan and others were dragged out of their vehicles. The mob beat them with rods and sticks and captured the violence on video. Pehlu Khan died from his injuries days later on 3 April 2017, whilst others, though seriously injured, survived.

The perpetrators also reportedly robbed the victims of their cellphones and wallets (the victims said they lost Rs. 110,000).

== Arrests and trial ==
An F.I.R. was filed at the local Behror police station by Khan against six identified and 200 unidentified persons. Though arrests were only made on 5 April, after Khan's death two days prior, when the Rajasthan Police arrested three people; Kalu Ram, Vipin Yadav and Ravindra Yadav on the basis of video footage recorded by the assailants, they were subsequently granted bail in the following months. Further arrests of Dayanand Yadav and Neeraj Yadav were made on 8 April.

The case was ultimately transferred to the Criminal Investigation Department-Crime Branch (CID-CB) after multiple delays and changes in four investigating officers. In the final report submitted to the police on September 1, the CID exonerated the six persons - the aforementioned and another Bheem Rathi. In the chargesheet submitted by the police to the Additional Chief Judicial Magistrate of Behror in May, 2019, they also reportedly charged Khan's two sons and his transporter under the Rajasthan Bovine Animal (Prohibition of Slaughter and Regulation of Temporary Migration or Export) Act, 1995. This was denied by the Chief Minister of Rajasthan Ashok Gehlot and the charges were withdrawn. At the trial court of the Additional District Judge, Alwar all of the original six accused were acquitted in August, 2019 on basis of "benefit of doubt". This was attributed by the People's Union for Civil Liberties on the lack of forensics done by the police on the video recording of the killing by the assailants. The case was subsequently appealed to the Rajasthan High Court where it remains as of 2021.

== Response ==
The incident was widely condemned, and many called for the government to crack down on cow-protection vigilante groups. The Supreme Court issued notices on 7 April 2017 to Rajasthan along with four other Indian states (Gujarat, Jharkhand, Maharashtra and Karnataka) and to the central government asking for a ban on cow vigilante groups. Home Minister Rajnath Singh has assured justice for the lynching incident.

Rajasthan's Home Minister Gulab Chand Kataria defended the cow vigilantes, describing their deed as "alright" and blaming the victims for illegally transporting animals though the victims had documents from Jaipur Municipal Corporation for the purchase of cows. Initially, Minister of State for Parliamentary Affairs Mukhtar Abbas Naqvi also denied the incident and stated "Alwar gau rakshak [cow protection] attack did not happen", but later admitted the incident and tried to clarify his earlier remark. Federal Minister Hansraj Ahir condemned the incident. Congress vice President Rahul Gandhi condemned the killing.

Sadhvi Kamal Didi praised the vigilantes accused of carrying out the lynching. Kamal Didi is the president of Rasthriya Mahila Gau Rakshak Dal, a cow-protection group. She equated the accused to popular historical Indian figures like Bhagat Singh and Chandra Shekhar Azad, saying the vigilantes of today will "be known as heroes in the future".

== See also ==
- Cow vigilante violence in India
- Lynching
- Tabrez Ansari lynching
- 2017 Pratapgarh lynching
- 2016 Jharkhand mob lynching
- 2015 Dimapur mob lynching
- Cattle in religion
