= 2023 Bhiwani killings =

Killings by cow vigilantes in Haryana

- Nasir (left) and Junaid (right)
- Deaths: 2

The 2023 Bhiwani Killings, also known as the Killings of Nasir and Junaid, refer to the brutal murder of two men, Nasir (aged 25) and Junaid alias Juna (aged 35), both residents of Ghatmika village in Bharatpur district, Rajasthan. On 16 February 2023, their charred bodies were discovered inside a burnt Bolero vehicle near Loharu in Haryana's Bhiwani district.

The killings, allegedly perpetrated by cow vigilantes associated with the Bajrang Dal, sparked widespread outrage and renewed focus on vigilante violence in northern India. The case took a significant turn in July 2025 with the suicide of Lokesh Singla, one of the accused, who alleged harassment by Bajrang Dal members in a video recorded before his death.

== Background ==
Nasir and Junaid, residents of Ghatmika village in Rajasthan's Bharatpur district, were reportedly abducted on 15 February 2023 while traveling. According to family members, the two men were intercepted by a group of cow vigilantes who suspected them of involvement in cow smuggling, an issue that has fueled vigilante violence in parts of India due to the cultural and religious significance of cows in Hinduism.

Junaid had a prior criminal record, with five cases registered against him for bovine smuggling at various police stations, according to police reports.

The Rajasthan-Haryana border region, particularly areas like Mewat and Bhiwani, has been a hotspot for cow vigilantism, with groups like the Bajrang Dal often accused of taking the law into their own hands.

== Incident ==
On 15 February 2023, Nasir and Junaid were allegedly abducted by a group of cow vigilantes. According to sources close to the investigation, the two men were waylaid, brutally assaulted, and possibly tied with a belt inside a Bolero vehicle before being set ablaze.

Their charred remains were discovered the following morning, 16 February 2023, inside a burnt Bolero vehicle in Loharu, Bhiwani district, Haryana. DNA tests conducted by the Rajasthan Police confirmed the identities of the victims by matching samples with their family members. Blood samples recovered from a Scorpio vehicle, found in Haryana's Jind district, also matched the deceased, confirming they were beaten and abducted prior to their deaths.

The vehicle used in the abduction, a white Scorpio, was traced to the Haryana government’s Development and Panchayat Department, raising questions about the misuse of official resources in vigilante activities. Reports also indicated that the same vehicle had been linked to prior incidents of violence against alleged cow smugglers.

== Investigation ==
The Rajasthan Police took the lead in investigating the case, registering an FIR against several individuals associated with the Bajrang Dal, including Monu Manesar, a prominent member and leader of Haryana’s cow protection task force in Gurugram. The FIR named 13 individuals initially, with a chargesheet later filed in May 2023 against 21 accused, including Monu Manesar, Rinku Saini, Shrikant, Azad Acharya Arya, and Lokesh Singla.

Rinku Saini, identified as the chief of Bajrang Dal’s gau-raksha (cow protection) unit in Mewat, was arrested shortly after the incident. Saini’s interrogation provided critical leads, including the recovery of the Scorpio vehicle in Jind, which contained blood traces linked to the victims. Two additional accused were arrested in Uttarakhand in April 2023. However, Monu Manesar and several others remained absconding, prompting protests from the victims’ families and activists demanding their arrest.

The investigation revealed that the victims were assaulted by multiple groups of cow vigilantes, tortured for hours to extract information about alleged cattle smuggling operations, and then murdered.

Allegations of police negligence surfaced, with family members and the accused claiming that Nasir and Junaid were brought to a police station in Ferozepur Jhirka, Nuh, after their initial assault, but the police refused to take them into custody.

In response, the Haryana Police formed a Special Investigation Team (SIT) led by ASP Usha Kundu to probe potential negligence by its Crime Investigation Agency (CIA) team in Nuh.

== Accused Lokesh Singla's suicide and allegations ==
On 5 July 2025, Lokesh Singla, one of the 21 accused in the killings, died by suicide after allegedly jumping in front of a train near Palwal on the Delhi-Agra rail route in Haryana. Singla, a self-proclaimed cow vigilante from Bichhor village in Nuh district, had been absconding since the incident and was reportedly evading police by frequently changing locations.

Before his death, Singla recorded a video, allegedly sent to his wife Damyanti via WhatsApp, in which he accused three individuals—Bharat Bhushan (Bajrang Dal's Haryana state convener), Anil Kaushik, and Harkesh Yadav, all residents of Hathin in Palwal district—of harassing and mentally torturing him. In the video, Singla claimed he was being stalked, threatened, and blackmailed with false cases, stating, “I am going to take my life today... fed up of daily threats from three persons... they send new goons every day... they follow me... they say they will frame me in court cases.” The video, which went viral on social media, could not be independently verified by some media outlets.

Following Singla's death, his wife filed a complaint with the Government Railway Police (GRP) in Faridabad, leading to an FIR against Bharat Bhushan, Anil Kaushik, and Harkesh Yadav under sections 108 (abetment of suicide) and 3(5) (common intention) of the Bharatiya Nyaya Sanhita.

The police recovered a handwritten note from the scene and are investigating the allegations made in both the note and the video. Singla's suicide and his accusations against Bajrang Dal members added a new layer of complexity to the case, raising questions about internal conflicts within cow vigilante groups and the pressures faced by the accused.

== Societal impact ==
The Bhiwani killings reignited debates about cow vigilantism, extrajudicial violence, and the role of law enforcement in addressing such incidents.

The case drew parallels to other high-profile lynchings, such as that of Umar Mohammed and Rakbar Khan, and the 2017 Alwar mob lynching, highlighting a pattern of violence targeting individuals suspected of cow smuggling, particularly in Haryana and Rajasthan.

Critics argued that lack of enforcement and political support for vigilante groups have emboldened such acts, while defenders of the accused, including some Hindu outfits, claimed the victims were involved in illegal activities.

The suicide of Lokesh Singla and his allegations against Bajrang Dal members have further complicated the narrative, pointing to potential infighting or misuse of influence within vigilante networks.

The case remains a focal point for discussions on justice, communal harmony, and the rule of law in India.
