= Jhirkeshwar mahadev =

Ancient temple in Haryana, India

Coordinates: 27.822756°N 76.927396°E

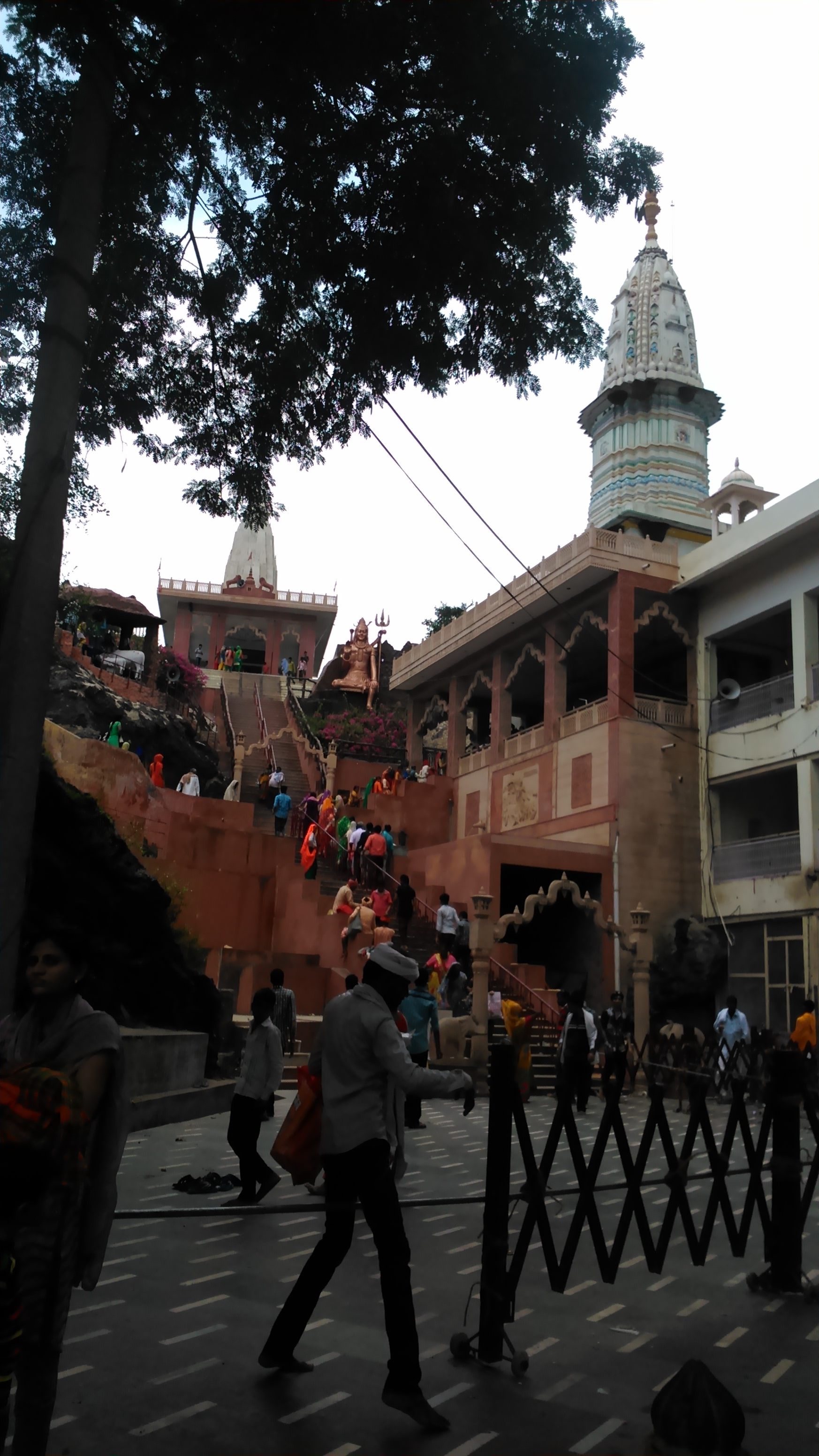
Jhirkeshwar Mahadev Temple

Jhirkeshwar Mahadev, also known as Jhir Mandir, is an ancient Hindu temple dedicated to Shiva and located in Ferozepur Jhirka, Haryana, India. This cave temple is located at foothills of Aravalli Range.

== History ==
According to legend, the Shiva Lingam was manifested by the invocation of mantras by the eldest Pandava brother, Yudhishthira, when they were going to Virat Nagar during exile. Later in 1870, Shiva appeared in the dreams of Pandit Jeevanalal Sharma, a tehsildar (tax inspector). He built the top of the temple. Since 1970, the Shiva temple development board, registered under Haryana government, has been looking after temple affairs.

The temple is the final stop of the Braj Mandal Jalabhishek Yatra that takes place each year, beginning on 22 July.

== Festivals ==
A big fair is held on Maha Shivaratri and during Hindu calendar month of Shraavana.
