= William H. Lynch =

Former Mississippi state legislator

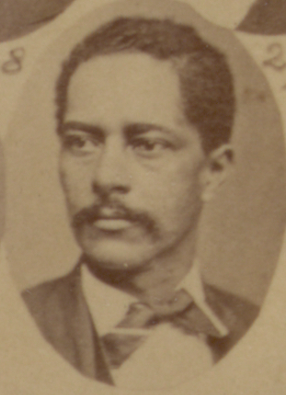

Member of the Mississippi House of Representatives
- In office 1882–1889
- In office 1874–1877

Personal details
- Born: c. 1845
- Died: January 8, 1890 Natchez, Mississippi, U.S.
- Party: Republican
- Profession: Politician

William H. Lynch was a state legislator in Mississippi. He represented Adams County, Mississippi in the Mississippi House of Representatives from 1874 to 1877 and from 1882 to 1889. He was a Republican. He pushed for a bill to establish and fund an institute in Natchez, Mississippi for blind African Americans.

== See also ==
- African American officeholders from the end of the Civil War until before 1900
