= Balumath (community development block) =

- Community development block
- Location in Jharkhand, India Balumath (India)
- Coordinates: 23°50′N 84°47′E
- Country: India
- State: Jharkhand
- District: Latehar

Government
  - Type: Community development block

Languages
  - Official: Hindi, Nagpuri
- Time zone: UTC+5:30 (IST)
- Vehicle registration: JH-19
- Website: latehar.nic.in

Balumath Block is a community development block located in the Latehar district of Jharkhand. Latehar, the district headquarters, is 23 km west of Balumath. It is one of the seven community development blocks in the Latehar district. It has a total of 174 villages which include Bariyatu and Herhanj. It has 27 panchayats which is the highest among the developmental blocks of the Latehar district.

Ranchi, the state capital, is around 82 km south-east. Tori Railway Station is the nearest railway and Ranchi Airport is the nearest airport. Makayya tand is about 19 km south-west. Kanti Waterfalls is a nearby tourist destination.
