= 2015 Dimapur mob lynching =

In Nagaland, India

The 2015 Dimapur mob lynching was a case of mob lynching that took place in Dimapur, Nagaland, India, on 5 March 2015. A mob of about 7000–8000 people broke into a prison, dragged a man detained under accused of rape out of the Dimapur Central Jail, paraded him naked and beat him to death in a case of vigilante justice.

The incident took place in the backdrop of widespread public anger and hatred towards non-locals under the garb of sexual violence against women in India and a controversy over a ban on the documentary India's Daughter, based on the 2012 Delhi gang rape, and concerns in Nagaland over illegal immigration from Bangladesh.

== Events ==
Location of Dimapur in India

=== Alleged rape ===
According to the first information report (FIR) filed by the victim, a 20-year-old student of Shri Digamber Jain Girls' College, was raped in Hotel De Oriental Dream in Dimapur on 23 February 2015. The accused Farid Khan and his accomplice Nikavi, alias Ngukav forcibly assaulted her and intoxicated her. Then Farid Khan had allegedly raped her multiple times. The accused and his accomplice were arrested on 25 February 2015 for rape and assault, and were lodged in Dimapur Central Jail. They had been charged under Indian Penal Code sections 476, 344 and 363.

The rape victim later in an interview claimed that she had been given ₹5,000 by the accused to remain silent about the incident. She said that the man was known to her as her neighbor and his wife belonged to the same village as her. She also said that she was lured into a car by a friend, who then left. The man then intoxicated her and raped her several times. She later reported it to the police and handed over the money. The accused Farid Khan told Nagaland Police in his interrogation that he had consensual sex with her for which he had given her money.

=== Identity of the man ===
Initially, the man was thought to be an illegal immigrant from Bangladesh. The accused was later named as Syed Sarif Uddin Khan, alias Farid, a 35-year-old used car businessman. Originally from, Karimganj district of Assam, he had been living in Nagaland for 8 years. He was married to a Naga lady for 4 years and had a three-year-old daughter.

The family of the accused claimed that he was framed. One of his brothers, who also lived in Dimapur and ran a business said the woman who had filed the case was close to the accused's family and was well-acquainted with his wife. He claims that the woman had invited Farid to a hotel with some other persons on 23 February, and that she forced him to drink and demanded ₹200,000 from him. He asserts that on being refused, she filed a case the next day.

=== Mob attack ===
On 5 March, about 7000-8000 people broke into the Dimapur Central Jail. They dragged the accused out, while parading him naked, pelted him with stones and beat him. They dragged the accused to a clock tower about 7km away, by tying a rope to his waist from a motorcycle. The accused died on the way. The body was displayed from the clock tower's railings, until the police came and took it down. The Superintendent of Police Meren Jamir later said that the mob was led by a group of a few hundred school and college girls in uniforms, which prevented the police from using more force. Jamir said that the initial crowd was small and they had been repelled by baton charges. But, later the mob returned with larger numbers. Even though 8 companies of security forces were present at the jail, they failed to stop the mob. The police later said that there was at least one former inmate of the prison, who knew the interior layout of the jail.

The police had fired blanks and tear gas at the crowd but had failed to disperse them. One member of the mob was killed and 52 members of the police were injured in the clashes. The mob also burnt 10 police vehicles.

Initially, it was reported that the man was an illegal immigrant from Bangladesh. There had been calls from local organisations to expel outsiders. The incident was also attributed to the faulty justice system of the state, which had obtained few convictions in various cases of rape. The man's local accomplice who was lodged in same jail was left alone by the mob.

=== Aftermath ===
In the home state of the accused, Assam, All Assam Minority Students' Union burnt an effigy of the Nagaland government in Nagaon, accusing the government of discriminating against minorities living in the state, and demanded an investigation by the Central Bureau of Investigation (CBI) on 6 March.

On 6 March, Assam Chief Minister Tarun Gogoi condemned the attack and discussed the matter with Home Minister Rajnath Singh and Nagaland Chief Minister T. R. Zeliang. Dimapur Deputy Police Commissioner Wezope Kenye and Superintendent of Police Meren Jamir were suspended on the evening of 6 March. The Central Jail Chief was also suspended. Residents of Nagaland were asked to avoid traveling into Assam. Shops and commercial established remained closed on 6 March in Dimapur under a curfew.

On 7 March, truckers from Assam stopped moving goods into Nagaland in protest of the incident. They also alleged they are harassed in Nagaland and asked to pay illegal tolls. Amnesty International India on 7 March demanded an investigation into the incident, calling it a serious lapse of the justice system. The curfew continued in Dimapur. Chief Minister Zeliang said that there had been administrative lapses and that relaxing the Section 177 of the CrPC, which prohibits unlawful assembly, in Nagaland was a mistake. He also said that the social media was responsible for inciting the incident. Later, Nagaland government restricted telecom services in the region. Internet was blocked for 48 hours in the state starting on the night of 7 March. SMS and MMS services were also blocked.

Also on 7 March, Chief Minister Gogoi blamed the security force of the central government for failing to protect the jail. Gogoi also claimed that the medical report had not confirmed rape. The brother of the dead also repeated the claim. The body was airlifted to the dead's hometown in Bosla village in Karimganj district.

On 8 March, the body of the man was buried in his village. About, 4000 Bengali Muslims had left Nagaland by then, fearing attacks.

On 10 March 2015, the protesters agitated against the 5 March 2015, incident at Hojai. The protesters blocked the railway tracks near the Hojai railway station. Therefore, the lone train service the Nagaland Express originating from Dimapur to Guwahati was made to halt for nearly an hour at Lanka Railway Station.

=== Investigation ===
On 6 March, it was reported that the police were examining the CCTV footage from the Dimapur hotel where the rape had allegedly taken place. The Superintendent of Police, Meren Jamir said that the footage showed the girl entering and leaving the room with the accused. On the same day, it was announced that Zeilang's state cabinet had appointed Veprasa Nyekha, a retired district and sessions judge, to head a judicial inquiry commission.

On 8 March, Inspector-General of Police Wabang Jamir said from initial medical report it appeared the girl was raped and that the samples had been sent to a forensic lab. By 8 March, 22 people had been arrested in connection to the lynching. The arrests were made after the police analysed the video clips of the incidents. By 9 March, 43 people had been arrested in connection to the lynching.

Of those arrested, 25 were identified as the "core mob" group. The police found that most those who had joined the mob, had come in response to comments on two blogs: The Naga Blog and Naga Spear. The protest march was initially intended to condemn the rape, but it became politically motivated. Soon afterwards, the district collector was asked to handover the accused but he refused. The mob kept vandalising sites and photographs were uploaded to the blogs. After the administrator of Naga Blog began deleting posts, the people moved to Naga Spear. Instant messaging apps were also used to increase the size of the mob. The mob believed that they were lynching a Bangladeshi.

On 11 March, it was reported that the Nagaland state government informed the Ministry of Home Affairs that the alleged rapist had claimed in the interrogation after his arrest that he had never raped the victim and that it was consensual sex for which he gave her ₹5,000. But, Nagaland Chief Minister T. R. Zeliang later told The Times of India that the Ministry of Home Affairs had been misquoted by the media. Nagaland Government denied that it has stated that no rape had taken place and preliminary medical reports indicated rape and it had sent samples to the Central Forensic Laboratory in Guwahati.

On 19 March 2015, after a cabinet meeting the Nagaland government recommended a Central Bureau of Investigation (CBI) inquiry for the case. By then, the police had arrested 55 people and issued photos of 34 wanted suspects.

On 18 May 2015, a judicial commission, headed by retired Gauhati High Court judge B. D. Agarwal, began its investigation. The commission in a public notice asked local newspapers, associations, unions, blogs including Naga Blog and Naga Spear, principals of schools and colleges, and family members of the victims to submit written statements regarding the lynching. On 18 June 2015, it was reported that only three persons had submitted the requested statements.

On 7 September 2015, the Gauhati High Court directed the Central Bureau of Investigation (CBI) to start a probe and submit a report within 6 months. The Court was hearing a public interest litigation (PIL) filed by one Rajeeb Kalita of Guwahati. By then, 58 people had been arrested and 32 persons had lookout notices on them.

In June 2016, a judiciary inquiry commission headed by retired justice B. D. Agrawal released its findings in a report. The report found the incident occurred due to the ineffectiveness of the police. The report pointed out that the mob took two hours to reach the Central Jail from the City Tower and spent more than three hours in breaking the jail gates.

== See also ==
- Lynching
- Rape in India
- 2012 Delhi gang rape and murder
