= 2016 Jharkhand mob lynching =

Lynching in India

- Balumath (India)
- Location: Balumath, Jharkhand
- Date: 18 March 2016
- Target: Muslim cattle traders
- Attack type: Lynching
- Deaths: 2
- Perpetrators: Mithilesh Prasad Sahu; Pramod Kumar Sahu; Manoj Kumar Sahu; Awadhesh Sahu; Manoj Sahu

2016 Jharkhand mob lynching refers to the case of lynching of three Muslim cattle traders by allegedly cattle-protecting vigilantes in Balumath forests of Latehar district in the Indian state of Jharkhand on 18 March 2016. The attackers killed 32 year old Mazlum Ansari and 12 year old Imtiaz Khan who were both found hanging from a tree.

== Events ==
=== Attack ===
According to Jharkhand police, preliminary investigation revealed that the two were on their way to a cattle market in Chatra district. They had at least eight oxen with them, which they intended to sell. On 18 March 2016, they were reportedly caught by a group of tribal villagers in the early hours, beaten to death, and hanged from a tree. According to villagers, there had been communal clashes over beef-eating in the area three months prior. Police stated that the murder was aimed at looting money and cattle.

=== Aftermath and arrests ===
Jharkhand Police arrested 5 people and identified them as Mithilesh Prasad Sahu also known by his nickname Bunty, Pramod Kumar Sahu, Manoj Kumar Sahu, Awadhesh Sahu and Manoj Sahu and are looking for three others, also said to be involved in the murders. One of the accused has links to a local Gau Raksha Samiti (an outfit for protection of cows).

=== Reactions ===
Opposition party Congress and Jharkhand Vikas Morcha condemned the attack and demanded justice for family of the two victims.

== See also ==
- Cow vigilante violence in India since 2014
