= Lynching of Tabrez Ansari =

2019 lynching in India

Tabrez Ansari lynching
- Tabrez Ansari during lynching

- Lynching of Tabrez Ansari (Jharkhand) Lynching of Tabrez Ansari (India)
- Location: Dhatkidih, Saraikela, Jharkhand, India
- Date: 17 June 2019
- Target: Tabrez Ansari
- Attack type: Lynching
- Weapon: Blunt objects
- Deaths: 1 (Tabrez Ansari)
- Perpetrator: Mob
- Accused: 11

Dhatkidih, seraikela, Jharkhand, India

On 17 June 2019, 24-year-old Tabrez Ansari was attacked by a lynch mob in Jharkhand, India. Ansari, a Muslim, was tied to a tree, brutally beaten and forced to chant Hindu religious slogans. He died four days later. The incident came to light after a video of the lynching went viral. The attackers accused him of bike theft. India's Prime Minister commented on this lynching in the Parliament of India.

The police investigating the case, later dropped murder charges against a dozen accused. Instead a relatively milder charge of culpable homicide not amounting to murder was invoked against a dozen accused. This resulted in allegations of weakening the case. The police filed a supplementary charge sheet and charged 11 accused with murder.

== Events ==
Tabrez Ansari was an orphan. He lived in Pune and worked there for seven years. He visited his hometown of Kadamdih occasionally on festivals. For Eid al-Fitr he visited Kadamdih. During the visit, on 17 June, he went to Jamshedpur with two friends on the bike of one of his friends. While returning from Jamshedpur, he was caught in the village Dhatkidih, near Kadamdih. He was tied to a tree by the mob and brutally beaten on the suspicion of bike theft. While the mob was beating him, a video was made by an unidentified person in the mob. He was forced to say religious slogans such as "Jai Shri Ram", which translates from Hindi to "hail Lord Ram" or "victory to Lord Ram", and "Jai Hanuman".

On the morning of 18 June, the police were notified. Ansari was arrested and locked up in Saraykela Police Station. His wife received a call from him telling her what had happened. She informed her relatives.

His uncle visited the station and saw that he was severely injured. He asked the police to provide medical treatment, but Ansari was sent to prison without it. Two days later. when his uncle went to see him in prison, Ansari was not in any condition to talk. His uncle alleged that he contacted the police for medical help, but was denied. He tried to reach the medical officer of the prison too, but was unable to meet him. On the morning of 22 June, Ansari's family received news that his condition was severe, and he was admitted to Sadar Hospital. His relatives reached the hospital by 7:30 am, but by that time, he had died.

== Response ==
The Tabrez family demanded that the perpetrators be tried under Section 302 (Punishment for murder) of the Indian Penal Code. Ansari's wife said that her husband was mercilessly beaten because he was a Muslim. She demanded justice.

On 25 June, 11 arrests were made, and two policemen were suspended for "not reporting the seriousness of the issue to the higher authorities" and "register [sic] a case of lynching on the very same day"

A Special Investigation Team was assigned to investigate the case. The Saraikela-Kharsawan district police charged 11 of the 13 named accused in the case on 29 July. The murder charges were then dropped, but later reinstated.

A medical panel of five members was formed to look into the death. The resulting medical report concluded that Tabrez Ansari suffered a skull fracture caused by a "hard and blunt object", a subarachnoid haemorrhage, and clotting of blood in the lower layer of the skull; and suggests that these injuries led to the cardiac arrest that resulted in Ansari's death. The consumption of poison was ruled out.

On 9 September 2019, the police dropped the murder charges by giving cardiac arrest as the reason of death, which led to an uproar. Instead, relatively milder charges of culpable homicide not amounting to murder was invoked. Due to this, the police were accused of weakening the case. On 18 September 2019, the police filed a supplementary charge sheet after obtaining the opinion of a board of doctors of MGM Medical College and Hospital, reinstating the murder charges against 11 accused.

== Reaction ==
The lynching resulted in public anger, debates on the use of "Jai Shri Ram" as a war cry against Muslims and multiple protests, including one in New Delhi held near the parliament house, where protesters chanted slogans against the BJP and Prime Minister Narendra Modi and demanded an end to anti-Muslim violence.

Modi commented on the lynching in parliament, that he was pained to hear about the incident and calling for "the strictest possible punishment to the accused". Rahul Gandhi, at the time President of the Indian National Congress, called the lynching a "blot on humanity".

Vishwa Hindu Parishad called the lynching "a conspiracy of secularists", which VHP Joint General Secretary Surendra Jain blamed on "the Khan Market Mafia, which has repeatedly been maligning Hindu society, India and humanity."

The issue was raised at the 41st General Session of the United Nations Human Rights Council along with an increasing number of mob lynchings against Muslims and Dalits in India since Prime Minister Narendra Modi came to power.

== See also ==
- Violence against Muslims in India
