= William Lynch (Lynch law) =

American military officer (1742–1820)

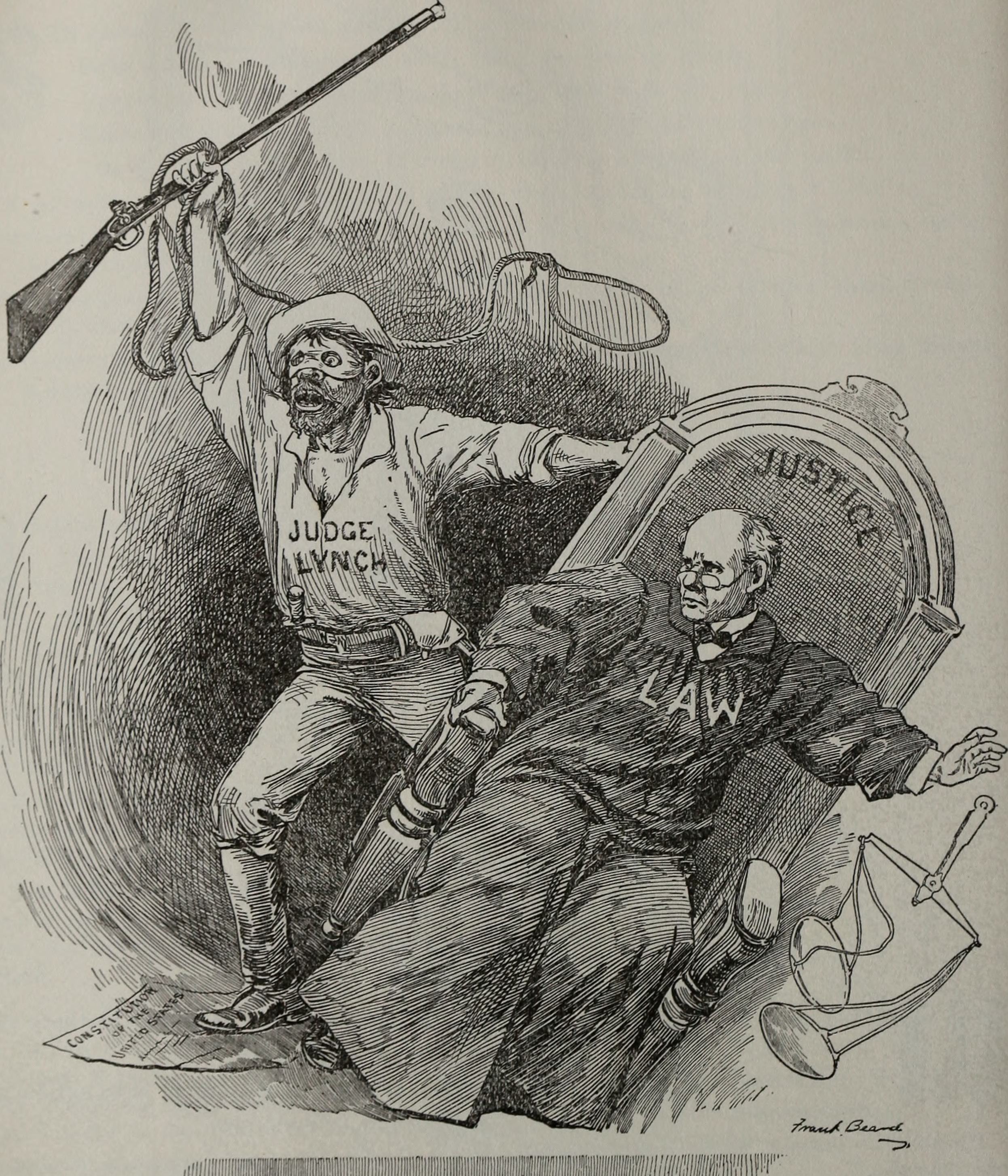
- Born: 1742
- Died: 1820 (aged 77–78)
- Known for: claims to be the source of the terms lynch law and lynching

William Lynch (1742–1820) was an American military officer from Pittsylvania County, Virginia. He claimed to be the source of the terms "lynch law" and "lynching".

== Lynch's Law ==
The term "Lynch's Law" was used as early as 1782 by a prominent Virginian named Charles Lynch to describe his actions in suppressing a suspected Loyalist uprising in 1780 during the American Revolutionary War.

The suspects were given a summary trial at an informal court; sentences handed down included whipping, property seizure, coerced pledges of allegiance, and conscription into the military. Charles Lynch's extralegal actions were legitimized by the Virginia General Assembly in 1782.

In 1811, Captain William Lynch claimed that the phrase "Lynch's Law", already famous, actually came from a 1780 compact signed by him and his neighbours in Pittsylvania County, Virginia, to uphold their own brand of law independent of legal authority. The obscurity of the Pittsylvania County compact, compared to the well-known actions of Charles Lynch, casts doubt on it being the source of the phrase. According to the American National Biography:

What was purported to be the text of the Pittsylvania agreement was later printed in the Southern Literary Messenger (2 [May 1836]: 389). However, the Pittsylvania County alliance, if it was formed at all, was so obscure compared to the well-known suppression of the uprising in southwestern Virginia that Charles Lynch's use of the phrase makes it seem most probable that it was derived from his actions, not from William Lynch's.

The compact published in the Southern Literary Messenger that proposed William Lynch as the originator of "lynch law" may have been a hoax perpetrated by Edgar Allan Poe.
