= Cow vigilante violence in India =

Mob attacks against bovine meat industry

Cow vigilante violence is a pattern of mob-based collective vigilante violence seen in India. The attacks are perpetuated by Hindu nationalists against non-Hindus (mostly Muslims) to protect cows, which are considered sacred in Hinduism. Cattle slaughter is banned in most states of India. Recently emerged cow vigilante groups, claiming to be protecting cattle, have been violent leading to a number of deaths. Cow-protection groups see themselves as preventing cattle theft and smuggling, protecting the cow or upholding the law in an Indian state which bans cow slaughter. According to a Reuters report, a total of 63 cow vigilante attacks had occurred in India between 2010 and mid 2017, mostly since the Prime Minister Narendra Modi came to power in 2014. In these attacks between 2010 and June 2017, "28 Indians – 24 of them Muslims – were killed and 124 injured", states the Reuters report. Research by Armed Conflict Location and Event Data concluded that cow vigilante action by Hindus was the primary reason for violence against Muslim civilians between June 2019 to March 2024.

There has been a rise in the number of incidents of cow vigilantism since the election of a Bharatiya Janata Party (BJP) majority in the Parliament of India in 2014. The frequency and severity of cow vigilante violence has been described as "unprecedented". Human Rights Watch has reported that there has been a surge in cow vigilante violence since 2015. The surge is attributed to the recent rise in Hindu nationalism in India. Many vigilante groups say they feel "empowered" by the victory of the Hindu nationalist BJP in the 2014 election. The Supreme Court of India in September 2017 ruled that each state should appoint a police officer in each district to take strict action against cow vigilantism. The court also expressed its concerns that animals were being illegally slaughtered such as the case of 200 slaughtered cattle found floating in a Bihar river.

== Background and history ==
The BJP has run the Indian central government since its election victory in 2014. Following Narendra Modi's rise to power, extremist Hindu groups have led attacks across the country that have targeted Muslim and Dalit communities. These attacks have been carried out with the stated intention of protecting cows. Dalit groups are particularly vulnerable to such attacks, as they are frequently responsible for disposing of cattle carcasses and skins. The perpetrators of these attacks, described as "vigilantism" by Human Rights Watch, have stated that they are protecting the rights of Hindus, and that the police do not adequately deal with cow slaughter. Scholar Radha Sarkar has argued that "cow vigilantism itself is not new in India, and violence over the protection of cows has occurred in the past. However, the frequency, impunity, and flagrance of the current instances of cow-related violence are unprecedented." In 2015 Business Insider reported that vigilante attacks on trucks carrying cattle had increased in Maharastra. In 2017, Bloomberg reported that according to meat industry representatives, cow vigilantes have been stopping vehicles, extorting money and stealing valuable livestock. Cow vigilante activity also increased during the run up to the 2015 Bihar Legislative Assembly election. BJP leader Sushil Kumar Modi said the election was "a fight between those who eat beef and those who are against cow slaughter". The Economist argued in 2016 that cow vigilantism can sometimes be a profitable business. It pointed to an Indian Express investigation that found that vigilantes in Punjab charge cattle transporters 200 rupees ($3) per cow in exchange for not harassing their trucks.

Analysing the reasons for the vigilantism, academic Christophe Jaffrelot has said that the RSS is attempting to transform society from within through a sense of discipline which it believes is needed for defending Hindus more effectively. He also has stated that the Hindu nationalists do not want the state to prevail over the society, and want the society to regulate itself, with an emphasis on social order and hierarchy, which is part of Hindutva ideology. According to him, this Hindu nationalist approach gives the act of policing a greater legitimacy and it is clearly synonymous with the populist behaviour, since for the populist leader, the people and their will prevail over the law and institutions. Jaffrelot further remarks:

"The fact that the vigilantes "do the job" is very convenient for the rulers. The state is not guilty of violence since this violence is allegedly spontaneous and if the followers of Hinduism are taking the law into their hands, it is for a good reason—for defending their religion. The moral and political economies of this arrangement are even more sophisticated: The state cannot harass the minorities openly, but by letting vigilantes do so, it keeps majoritarian feelings satisfied. The private armies, which may be useful for polarising society before elections are also kept happy—not only can they flex their muscles, but they usually extort money (violence mostly occurs when they cannot do so, as is evident from the recent cases of lynching)."

== Cow protection vigilante groups ==
As of 2016, cow protection vigilante groups were estimated to have sprung up in "hundreds, perhaps thousands" of towns and villages in northern India. There were an estimated 200 such groups in Delhi-National Capital Region alone. Some of the larger groups claim to have up to 5,000 members.

Among cow protection groups are gangs who patrol highways and roads at night, looking for trucks that might be "smuggling" cows across the state borders. These gangs are sometimes armed; they justify this by claiming that cow smugglers themselves are also often armed. The Haryana branch of Bhartiya Gau Raksha Dal described to The Guardian that it had exchanged gunfire with alleged smugglers, killed several of them and lost several of its members too. The gangs have been described as "unorganized", and gang leaders admit that their members can be hard to control.

The gangs consist of volunteers, many of whom are poor laborers. The volunteers often tend to be young. According to a gang leader, "it's easy to motivate a youth". Often the youth are given "emotional" motivation by being shown graphic videos of animals being tortured. One member said that cow vigilantism had given him a "purpose in life".

The vigilantes often have a network of informers consisting of cobblers, rickshaw drivers, and vegetable vendors, who alert them to supposed incidents of cow slaughter. The group members and their network often use social media to circulate information. Their relationship with the police is disputed; some vigilantes claim to work with the police, while others claim that the police are corrupt and incompetent, and that they are forced to take matters into their own hands.

== Laws, state support, and legal issues ==
Cattle slaughter laws in states/UTs of India

The BJP government has introduced some restrictions on the slaughter of cattle. The slaughter of cattle for export was banned in May 2017. This restriction threatened an Indian beef export industry worth $4 billion annually. Several Indian states further restricted the slaughter of cows. For example, Maharashtra passed stricter legislation banning the possession, sale, and consumption of beef in March 2015. Cow vigilantes have also been emboldened by these laws and attack Muslims suspected of smuggling cattle for slaughter.

Some Indian states have been accused of having laws that enable cow protection groups. In April 2017 the governments of six states: Rajasthan, Maharashtra, Gujarat, Jharkhand, Karnataka, and Uttar Pradesh were asked by the Supreme Court to answer a request to ban cow-protection related vigilantism. Many vigilantes believe their actions are approved by the government and Hindus of the country. For example, the vigilante group "Gau Rakshak Dal", formed in Haryana in 2012, believes it is acting on government mandate. Scholar Radha Sarkar has stated that the bans on beef "tacitly legitimize vigilante activity." Cow protection groups formed in Haryana in 2012 see themselves as "acting upon the mandate of the government." Such groups across the country have "[taken] it upon themselves to punish those they believe to be harming the cow." Such incidents of violence have occurred even in situations in which no illegal actions have occurred, such as in the handling of dead cattle. According to Sarkar, cow protection groups have taken actions that they know to be illegal, because they believe that they have the support of the government.

In November 2016, the BJP-led Haryana government said it would provide ID cards for cow vigilantes. They were not issued after the government collected many vigilantes' details. According to Human Rights Watch, many cow protection vigilante groups are allied with the BJP. According to BBC News, many cow-protection vigilantes attend training camps organized by Rashtriya Swayamsevak Sangh, which is the BJP's parent organization. Mukul Kesavan, in The Telegraph, accused BJP officials of justifying vigilantism. He pointed out that after some vigilante attacks, the BJP officials attempted to convince the police to charge the victims (or their families) for provoking the assault.

In 2018, a three-judge panel of the Supreme Court made observations that such incidents of vigilantism were mob violence and a crime. In addition, it placed the responsibility to prevent such crimes on the states.

== Incidents of violence ==
A number of incidents of violence have occurred. According to a June 2017 Reuters report, citing a data journalism website, a total of "28 Indians – 24 of them Muslims – have been killed and 124 injured since 2010 in cow-related violence". The frequency and severity of cow-related violence have been described as "unprecedented". The report stated that "Almost all of the 63 attacks since 2010 involving cow-related violence were recorded after Modi and his Hindu nationalist government came to power in 2014".

=== Before 1800s ===
Cow slaughter has been punishable by death in many instances in Indian history. Under the Scindia of Gwalior state and the Sikh Empire, people were executed for killing cows.

The "Holi Riot" of 1714 in Gujarat was in part cow-related. A Hindu had attempted to start the spring festivities of Holi by burning a public Holika bonfire, a celebration that his Muslim neighbors objected to. The Muslims retaliated by slaughtering a cow in front of Hindu's house. The Hindus gathered, attacked the Muslims, seized the Muslim butcher's son and killed him. The Muslims, aided by the Afghan army, sacked the neighborhood, which led Hindus across the city to retaliate. Markets and homes were burnt down. Many Hindus and Muslims died during the Holi riot. The cycle of violence continued for a few days devastating the neighborhoods in Ahmedabad. The cow-related violence and riots repeated in the years that followed, though the only documented 18th-century riots in Ahmedabad are of 1714.

=== 1800s ===
According to Mark Doyle, the first cow protection societies on the Indian subcontinent were started by Kukas of Sikhism, a reformist group seeking to purify Sikhism. The Sikh Kukas or Namdharis were agitating for cow protection after the British annexed Punjab. In 1871, states Peter van der Veer, Sikhs killed Muslim butchers of cows in Amritsar and Ludhiana, and viewed cow protection as a "sign of the moral quality of the state". According to Barbara Metcalf and Thomas Metcalf, Sikhs were agitating for the well-being of cows in the 1860s, and their ideas spread to Hindu reform movements.

According to Judith Walsh, widespread cow protection riots occurred repeatedly in British India in the 1880s and 1890s. These were observed in regions of Punjab, United Provinces, Bihar, Bengal, Bombay Presidency and in parts of South Myanmar (Rangoon). The anti-Cow Killing riots of 1893 in Punjab caused the death of at least 100 people. The 1893 cow killing riots started during the Muslim festival of Bakr-Id, the riot repeated in 1894, and they were the largest riots in British India after the 1857 revolt.

Riots triggered by cow-killings erupted in Lahore, Ambala, Delhi, United Provinces, Bihar and other places in the late 19th century. In Bombay alone, several hundred people were killed or injured in cow-related violence in 1893, according to Hardy. One of the issues, states Walsh, in these riots was "the Muslim slaughter of cows for meat, particularly as part of religious festivals such as Bakr-Id". The cow protection-related violence were a part of larger communal riots, religious disputes, and class conflicts during the colonial era.

Elsewhere, in 1893 there were riots in Azamgarh and Mau, in eastern Uttar Pradesh. The Azamgarh riots were born out of administrative disputes regarding cow slaughter. Reportedly an inexperienced British officer (Henry Dupernex) ordered Muslims to register with the police, if they wished to slaughter cows for Eid al-Adha. Many of the Muslims interpreted the order as an invitation to sacrifice.

In the town of Mau, there were riots in 1806, states John McLane, that had led to Sadar Nizamat Adawlat to prohibit cow sacrifices in 1808. The Hindus had interpreted this to mean a prohibition to all cattle slaughter. In early 19th-century the prohibition was enforced in a manner Hindu interpreted it. In the 1860s, the interpretation changed to Muslim version wherein cattle sacrifice was banned in 1808, but not cattle slaughter. This, states McLane, triggered intense dissatisfaction among Hindus. Mau, with nearly half of its population being Muslim, resisted Hindu interpretation. When a "local Muslim zamindar (landowner) insisted on sacrificing an animal for his daughter's wedding", a group of local Hindus gathered to object, according to McLane. Four thousand men from Ballia district and two thousand from Ghazipur district joined the Hindus in Mau to stop the sacrifice in 1893. They were apparently motivated by the belief that cows had not been killed in Mau since Akbar's time, but the British were now changing the rules to allow cow killing in new locations. The cow-protecting Hindus attacked the Muslims and looted a bazaar in Mau. The British officials estimated seven Muslims were killed in the riots, while locals placed the toll at 200.

=== 1900–1947 ===
Cattle protection-related violence continued in the first half of the 20th century. Examples of serious cow protection agitation and riots include the 1909 Calcutta riot after Muslims sacrificed a cow in public, the 1912 Faizabad riots after a Maulvi taunted a group of Hindus about a cow he was with, the 1911 Muzaffarpur riot when in retribution for cow slaughter by Muslims, the Hindus threatened to desecrate a mosque. In 1916 and 1917, over the Muslim festival of Eid-ul-Adha, two riots broke out in Patna with widespread rioting, looting and murders in major cities of Bihar. The British officials banned cow slaughter during Muslim Id festival of sacrifice. According to British colonial records, Hindu crowds as large as 25,000 attacked Muslims on Id day, violence broke out at multiple sites simultaneously, and civil authorities were unable to cope with. Many serious anti cow slaughter and cow protection-related riots broke out between 1917 and 1928 across India particularly on Muslim festival of sacrifice, from Punjab through Delhi to Orissa, leading to the arrests of hundreds.

In the 1920s, over 100 riots, 450 deaths and 5,000 injuries were recorded in Bengal which was divided in 1947 into East Pakistan and West Bengal. Two primary causes of the violence, states Nitish Sengupta, were Hindus Durga Puja processions playing music which continued as they passed near Muslim mosques, and Muslims killing cows in open during Eid-ul-Adha.

In 1946, rumors spread in Bengal that Hindus had secretly conspired to stop cow sacrifice on Eid-ul-Adha by bringing in Sikhs and arms into their homes. On the day of Islamic festival of sacrifice (September 1946), states Batabyal, the rumor spread among the Bengali Muslims congregated in mosques. The crowd coming out of the mosques then raided a large number of Hindu homes trying to find the arms and the Sikhs. Violence continued for about a week with "frequent instances of stray killings" and looting.

=== 1947–2011 ===
After the 1947 Partition of the Indian subcontinent into Pakistan and India, frequent riots and fatal violence broke in newly created India over cow slaughter. Between 1948 and 1951, cow slaughter led to a spate of riots broke out in Azamgarh, Akola, Pilbhit, Katni, Nagpur, Aligarh, Dhubri, Delhi and Calcutta. Riots triggered by slaughter of cows continued in rural and urban locations of India in the 1950s and 1960s. According to Ian Copland and other scholars, it was the practical stop of cow sacrifice ritual as Islamic festivals after 1947 that largely led to a reduction in riots from the peak observed just before India's independence. The riots, the add, re-emerged in the 1960s, when a new generation of Muslims born after the independence reached adolescence, who were less aware of the trauma of religious violence in India of the 1940s, began to assert their rights.

In 1966, 100 members of Indian parliament signed a petition for a nationwide ban on cow slaughter. Hindu sadhus (monks) gathered in Delhi to protest against cow slaughter, launched go-raksha (cow protection) agitation and demanded a ban. During a huge procession that was walking towards the parliament to press their demand, before they could reach the parliament, some people began a disturbance and rioting started. These riots killed eight people. Indira Gandhi, the newly nominated Prime Minister, continued her father's policy of no national ban on cow slaughter.

In 2002, five Dalit youths were killed by a mob in Jhajjar district, Haryana after accusations of cow slaughter. The mob were reportedly led by members of the Vishva Hindu Parishad, according to Human Rights Watch. According to People's Union for Democratic Rights, the Vishva Hindu Parishad and the Gauraksha Samiti have defended violent vigilantism around cow protection as sentiments against the "sin of cow-slaughter" and not related to "the social identity of the victims". Various groups, such as the families of the Dalits victims of cow-related violence in 2002, did not question the legitimacy of cow protection but questioned instead the false allegations.

== Responses ==
After an attack on four Dalits in Gujarat in July 2016, thousands of members of the Dalit community took to the streets to protest what they saw was "government inaction". The protests spread across the state. In clashes with the police, one policeman was killed and dozens of protesters were arrested. At least five Dalit youth attempted suicide, one of whom died.

A campaign, Not In My Name was conducted by filmmaker Saba Dewan through a Facebook post against the violence. Many people protested at Jantar Mantar in Delhi and more 16 cities across the country, including Mumbai, against forming lynch mobs in the name of cow vigilantism.

After 2014, the Documentation of the Oppressed (DOTO Database), an independent, non-profit documentation center, created an online platform that compiles instances of violence, with particular emphasis on marginalized groups and issues. The database aims to provide a repository of the instances of hate violence and give a wholesome narrative of the same; providing reports that add and supplement media-provided information, done to aid in intervention i.e., by advocacy or litigation. DOTO aims to tackle the issue with a right and community-based approach to increase all round vigilance on the issues.

The international organization Human Rights Watch in April 2017 reported that Indian authorities should promptly investigate and take action against the self-appointed "cow protectors", many linked to extremist Hindu groups, who have carried out attacks against Muslims and Dalits over rumors of selling, buying or killing of cows for beef.

Members of the BJP have denied supporting cow slaughter vigilantism. In May 2017, Union Minister and BJP leader Smriti Irani said that the BJP does not support cow protection vigilantes. An editorial in The New York Times stated that BJP is partly to blame, as they have stoked inflammatory rhetoric over cow slaughter. Siddharth Nath Singh has denied allegations that the BJP administration condones vigilantism and said that illegal attacks would be punished.

In August 2016, Prime Minister Narendra Modi expressed his displeasure at the rising frequency of incidents of cow vigilantism and condemned the practice. Several observers such as Prem Shankar Jha and Zafarul Islam Khan remarked that Modi has selectively condemned vigilante attacks on Dalits but not on Muslims, since while condemning this vigilantism, Modi did not specifically mention 'Muslims', who have been the major victims of the vigilante violence, despite mentioning 'Dalits'.

== Media ==
The documentary The Hour of Lynching is centred on the attack and murder of dairy farmer Rakbar Khan in July 2018.

== See also ==
- Cattle slaughter in India
- Cattle theft in India
- Hindu terrorism
- Hindutva
- Hate crime
