= 1966 anti-cow slaughter riot =

Protest outside the Indian Parliament

- Part of the cow protection movement
- Date: 7 November 1966
- Location: Delhi, India
- Goals: Nationwide ban on cow slaughter
- Methods: Demonstrations, picketing, hunger strikes, bandh
- Concessions: Joint parliamentary committee established to examine the feasibility of a ban on cow slaughter

Parties
Hindu ascetics Sarvadaliya Gorasksha Maha-Abiyan Samiti: Rashtriya Swayamsevak Sangh; Hindu Mahasabha; Vishva Hindu Parishad; Akhil Bharatiya Ram Rajya Parishad; Bhartiya Jana Sangh	Indian National Congress Government of India: Delhi Police

Lead figures
Swami Karpatri Shankaracharya of Puri	Indira Gandhi

Number
Marchers: 100,000 to 120,000+	

Casualties and losses
Deaths: 7; Injuries: Hundreds; Arrests: about 1500	

On 7 November 1966, a group of Hindu protestors, led by ascetics, naga sadhus and backed by Rashtriya Swayamsevak Sangh and Bharatiya Jana Sangh (aka Jan Sangh), approached the Indian Parliament to protest to criminalize cow slaughter. The incident resulted in a riot which ended with a death toll of 7 people and hundreds were injured. The total damage was estimated at 1 billion rupees by city officials; numerous vehicles were destroyed, along with numerous shops.

The episode was the culmination of a long-term movement by the Hindu Right to protect the cow, a traditional symbol of reverence in Hindu society. A meeting in late 1965 involving lobbying groups, naga sadhus and many religious dharma acharyas and influential Hindu religious orders initiated a year-long program of demonstrations and picketing, culminating in the planned march to the Parliament. Jan Sangh was a participant in the march. The march attracted hundreds of thousands of people for that march outside the parliament. Communist political figures including Bhupesh Gupta suspected clear-cut involvement of the Central Intelligence Agency (CIA).

The protest was targeting the key leaders of then government. The police responded with tear gas and cane clubs, but their resistance proved futile. As waves of demonstrators armed with tridents attacked the police and pelted them with stones, a policeman was stoned to death. Police were slow to respond, but at around 1:30 pm, they engaged in rifle fire and mounted a charge with lead-tipped clubs. While the charge was successful in dispersing the immediate mob, it caused fatal injuries, and having failed to succeed in breaching the Parliament gates, the mob merely scattered to attack other less-protected areas of Delhi. Houses of prominent legislators from the ruling party (Indian National Congress), including that of K. Kamaraj, were broken into. Passengers were forced out of vehicles before being set on fire, high-profile government buildings were ransacked, and random arson was indulged in.

Two weeks later, influential saints began their hunger strikes in protest; however, fissures in the front began to appear, and Gandhi chose to incorporate a Parliamentary Committee to analyze the feasibility of imposing a ban on cow slaughter. The front was consistently outvoted, the nominees eventually resigned, the committee never produced a report, and the politicians successfully shifted the focus of national politics away from the issue. The episode had significant effects on the national polity for many years. This was one of the few breaches of parliament, along with the 2001 Indian Parliament Attack.

== Background ==
=== Cow slaughter and religion ===
The scope, extent, and status of cow slaughter in ancient India has been a subject of intense scholarly dispute.

Marvin Harris notes the Vedic literature to be contradictory, with some stanzas suggesting ritual slaughter and meat consumption, while others suggesting a taboo on meat eating; however, Hindu literature relating to cow veneration became extremely common in the first millennium A.D., and by about 1000 A.D., vegetarianism had become a well accepted Hindu tenet. D. N. Jha, Romila Thapar, Juli Gittinger et al. assert that cows were neither inviolable nor revered in the ancient times; the contemporary sacredness was a result of multiple factors including the development of Ahimsa philosophy during the Upanishad spans and increasing influence of Brahminism. There have been rebuts.

The "protection of the cow" policy has commanded huge political significance in the subcontinent in precolonial spans; the Mughal emperor Akbar had banned the killing of cows, and cow slaughter was treated as a capital offense in many Hindu and Sikh-ruled states.

=== Cow protection and national politics ===
The first organised cow protection movement was started by Kukas of Sikhism, a reformist group, during the British Raj in the late 1800s, which framed cows as a "sign of the moral quality of the state". Their ideas soon spread to Hindu reform movements, with Arya Samaj playing a tremendous role in converting this sentiment into a national movement and extensively lobbying for criminalizing cow slaughter. The first Gaurakshini sabha (cow protection council) was established in the Punjab Province in 1882. The movement often manifested as brazen Anti-Muslim riots claiming thousands of lives across the country, especially on the occasions of Islamic festivals of sacrifices. The Cow riots of 1893 were the most intense civil disturbance on the Indian subcontinent since the Indian Rebellion of 1857.

Post-independence, the insertion of a clause about protection of cows into the Directive Principles and large-scale migration of Muslim populations into Pakistan led to a large reduction in riots. However, with the accumulation of political power in the hands of conservative Savarna elites, the Hindu Mahasabha and other allied organisations saw even more opportunity to actively solicit a total ban on cow slaughter. The overtly secular stances of Prime Minister Jawaharlal Nehru (who threatened to resign if such a bill were passed) foiled the efforts. Tensions began to re-emerge in the 1960s, when a new generation of Muslims born after independence and who were less aware of the trauma of religious violence in India of the 1940s, reached adolescence and began to assert their rights, whilst Nehru began to lose his firm grip over the Indian sociopolitical scenario.

=== All Party Campaign ===
After Nehru's death in 1964, a lobbying group set up by business magnate Seth Dalmia, Murli Chandra Sharma of the Bharatiya Jan Sangh, M. S. Golwalkar of the Rashtriya Swayamsevak Sangh for the purpose of cow protection, began to actively engage in open political campaigns. The topic soon penetrated into popular sociopolitical discourse, and the group gradually added Rashtriya Swayamsevak Sangh, Hindu Mahasabha, Akhil Bharatiya Ram Rajya Parishad, Vishva Hindu Parishad, and other Hindu parties. All stakeholders were subsequently invited to a meeting at Delhi in late 1965, which saw three of the four principal Shaivite shankaracharyas, dozens of mahants, and other ascetics from different religious orders promise to play integral roles in a nationwide campaign to mobilize the masses. Swami Karpatri was chosen as the leader, and he advocated for a program of demonstrations and picketing, leading up to a march on Parliament in November 1966, which was approved. The Shankaracharya of Puri also decided to undertake a fast until death unless cow slaughter was banned across the country; other ascetics supported his proposed agenda and some offered to court arrest, shall the need arise.

Picketing started outside the residence of Home Minister Gulzarilal Nanda in August 1966; as a patron of the Bharat Sadhu Samaj, he was widely seen as a figure sympathetic to their cause. In October 1966, a procession in Washim, Maharashtra, demanding a nationwide ban on cow slaughter led to a riotous situation; police fired on the rioters, killing 11 people. There was a discussion about the issue in the Union Cabinet, which refused to concede to popular sentiments; however Home Minister Gulzarilal Nanda recommended that states might choose to introduce a ban at their discretion. This episode served as an immediate trigger for more demonstrations.

On 6 November, preparations were highly visible, with posters plastered across the city and high-profile business houses sponsoring the meals of the marchers. A total bandh of all shops in Delhi was planned; Bhartiya Jan Sangh had joined in the rally at the last moment, and the front was now named Sarvadaliya Gorasksha Maha-Abiyan Samiti (SGMS; 'Committee for the Great All-Party Campaign for the Protection of the Cow').

== Police firing on Peaceful Protesters ==
On the morning of 7 November, a few hundred thousand people, predominantly from the Bharatiya Jan Sangh, Hindu Mahasabha, and Arya Samaj, had assembled from far-off places at an open space near the Parliamentary Complex. A vast majority of them were ash-smeared Aghori Sadhus. Christophe Jaffrelot noted it as the most popular mass movement since independence.

Proceedings started around noon, and the environment was reportedly 'relaxed, almost festive' per a report by The New York Times, with the virtues of cows being extolled; the first speaker was Swami Karpatri. Soon afterwards, Swami Rameshwaranand, a Lok Sabha legislator of Jan Sangh, from Karnal, Punjab who had earlier been expelled from the house for 10 days, by a majority INC vote, for a continual failure to abide by parliamentary decorum whilst urging for a ban on cow slaughter, rose to the podium. He leveraged his expulsion, asking the protesters "to teach a lesson" by forcing the Parliament to close down, while other hard-line leaders served as accompanying him. Jana Sangh leader Atal Bihari Vajpayee appealed to the Swami to withdraw his call and urged the demonstrators to maintain peace.

Thus the protestors hailed Swami Rameshwaranand ji by slogans of "Swami Rameshwaranand ki jai", and breached the barricades; the police responded at around 1:30 pm, as they engaged in rifle fire and mounted a charge with lead-tipped clubs. While the charge was successful in dispersing the immediate protesters, it caused fatal injuries. The total number of injuries reported by the Delhi police and the ruling government at the time is highly debated. As a retaliation to the cruel rifle firing on peaceful protesters, houses of prominent legislators from the ruling party (Indian National Congress), including that of K. Kamaraj, were broken into. Passengers were forced out of vehicles before being set on fire, high-profile government buildings were ransacked, and random arson was indulged in.

The riot, that started with the excessive police force killing widely recognized gurus and sadhus along with cows, ended at around 4:30 pm with a death toll of eight (significantly lower than independent outlet reports) and hundreds injured. The total damage was estimated at 1 billion rupees by city officials; numerous vehicles were destroyed, along with numerous shops. A curfew was imposed for 48 hours but withdrawn the next morning; the army was deployed for the first time, and a law concerning unlawful assembly was imposed for an indefinite time span. About 1,500 demonstrators, including over 500 ascetics and prominent leaders of Hindu Nationalist parties and SGMS, were arrested.

The Lieutenant Governor described the rioting as highly organised; intelligence agencies had failed to predict the situation. The extent of the violence was the most significant since the partition riots, and M. N. Srinivas commented that the episode solidly convinced him that the Hindus of North India had not evolved into modern people. A few days later, Balraj Madhok, Rameshwaranand, and other prominent functionaries of RSS and Jan Sangh were arrested on charges of stoking the riots. Political figures including Bhupesh Gupta suspected clear-cut involvement of the Central Intelligence Agency (CIA) in the agitation.

Vajpayee condemned the riots and blamed undesirable elements for the violence, saying that it had harmed a pious cause. There was widespread discontent against Nanda, who was believed to be sympathetic to the rioters, forcing him to resign; Prime Minister Indira Gandhi acquitted him of all blame before the Parliament and temporarily held the portfolio herself before choosing Yashwantrao Chavan as a replacement.

== Aftermath ==
Beginning on 17 November, Sadhus started courting arrest, as planned. On the 20th, Prabhudutt Brahmachari and the Shankaracharya of Puri began hunger strikes; others soon followed. Gandhi took a hardliner stance, refusing to 'cow down to the cow savers' and detained the fasting sadhus to shift them out of public view; however, the fasting continued along with popular mobilization by cow-slaughter activists. Whilst her stance was commended across liberal media and supported by the Communist Party and others, failing health of the Shankaracharya and the death of two less-prominent fasters followed.

Soon, fissures started appearing within SGMS. A religious faction led by Swami Karpatri split away around December 1966 to fight elections around the locus of cow protection, to the discontent of Gowalkar. Within a couple of weeks, the fourth Shankaracharya and other Vaishnava religious orders subsequently criticized the front for placing Shankaracharya's health in jeopardy. On 24 January, a seriously ailing Shankaracharya criticized the BJS for pandering to electoral politics and failing to protect either Hinduism or the cow.

Gandhi used this time to set up a joint parliamentary committee composed of animal husbandry experts and politicians across the divides (including from the SGMS); their agenda was to examine the 'feasibility' of a 'total ban on the slaughter of the cow and its progeny' and deliver a recommendation within a time frame of six months. The committee was to be chaired by Retd. Justice Amal Kumar Sarkar (along with two Congress chief ministers, two Congress Ministers of State, four central bureaucrats, and three nominees of SGMS—the Shankaracharya of Puri, Golwalkar, and R. P. Mookerji, elder brother of Syama Prasad Mukherjee), and the offer was accepted by all parties, with minimal negotiations. In the meantime, Gandhi once again recommended on 5 January 1967 that states enact their own bans on cow slaughter. Shankaracharya broke his fast; it had lasted 73 days and was longer than any other hunger strike in recorded Indian history.

Jan Sangh failed to leverage the cow-protection episode in any major manner from an electoral sense; their seats increased from 14 to just 35 in the 1967 Lok Sabha elections and Congress lost many seats, with its popular vote share dropping by about 4%; Jan Sangh had managed, however, to successfully challenge the Congress hegemony in urban Hindu areas, especially the cow belt.

The committee started its work after the elections. Shrewd planning by Gandhi had filled the committee with trusted secularists, federalists and people with an economic interest in the beef trade. The two factions often collided with a near-complete lack of any common ground. Outfoxed and outmaneuvered, the three members of the SGMS eventually resigned in July 1968. Whilst the committee continued, the issue rapidly lost momentum in national politics. The committee was finally dissolved in 1979, having never submitted a report.

== Legacy ==
Overall, the agitation propelled the Hindu Right into the foreground of national politics for the first time; simultaneously, Gandhi's successful negotiation helped establish her image as a resolute leader who later had the tenacity to lead a weakened Congress after the 1969 split. The episode also played a significant role in Gandhi's choosing to shift away from the staunch secular ideals displayed by her father, embracing the Hindu way of life and enabling communal politics.

Congress (R) went on to choose the cow-and-calf symbol during the 1971 Lok Sabha elections. On the other hand, after years of failure over issue of cow protection and a failure to mobilize the lower castes to their cause, the Hindu Right chose to shift their primary focus from cow protection to the Ram Janmbhoomi movement. RSS and VHP commemorate the event every year.

== See also ==
- Cattle slaughter in India
- Cow protection movement
- Bhartiya Gau Raksha Dal
- List of massacres in India
