= Aarakshan Virodhi Party =

- Abbreviation: AVP
- Ideology: Anti-reservation (disputed)
- ECI status: Registered Unrecognised
- Seats in Rajya Sabha: 0 / 245
- Seats in Lok Sabha: 0 / 543
- Seats in State Legislative Assembly: 0 / 4,036
- Seats in State Legislative Council: 0 / 426
- Number of states and union territories in government: 0 / 31 (28 States and 3 UTs)

Aarakshan Virodhi Party (AVP) is an Indian political party. In August 2018, the party attracted significant political and legal scrutiny following a protest wherein the Indian constitution was torn and burned and anti-reservation, anti-Ambedkar, alongside casteist anti-Dalit and anti-Bahujan slogans were raised.

== History ==
The Aarakshan Virodhi Party (AVP) was registered by the Election Commission of India (ECI) before the 2014 Indian general election, but remains unrecognised.

In July 2018, Mahesh Chand Pant, the AVP state president for Uttarakhand, participated in a protest demanding 70% caste-based reservations for Brahmins and Kshatriyas, the two highest castes in the Hindu varna system. The protest was organised by the Brahmin Kshatriya Reservation Movement Committee.

=== Tearing and burning of the Indian constitution ===
On 9 August 2018, the AVP, led by businessman Deepak Gaur, and the Youth Equality Foundation (also known as Azad Sena), led by Abhishek Shukla, organised a protest in Sansad Marg, New Delhi, against an amendment to the SC/ST (Prevention of Atrocities) Act. The protest featured the tearing and burning of copies of the constitution of India alongside anti-reservation, anti-Ambedkar, and casteist anti-Dalit and anti-Bahujan slogans. A day later, Anil Tanwar of the Bhim Sena filed a legal complaint against those involved in the protest, who subsequently fled. The police organised teams and conducted raids across Delhi, Haryana, and Uttar Pradesh. Gaur was apprehended in Faridabad before being arrested under the Prevention of Insults to National Honour Act.

Arvind Kejriwal, the then chief minister of Delhi, called the incident "shocking". Manish Sisodia, the then deputy chief minister of Delhi argued that the desecration of the constitution had been done at the behest of the central government. In 2022, Vinai Kumar Saxena, the then lieutenant governor of Delhi, further sanctioned the prosecution of individuals involved in the protest.

== Election results ==
Candidate	Election	Constituency	Election symbol	Result	Votes (Percent)
General elections
Deepak Gaur	2014 Indian general election	Faridabad Lok Sabha constituency (Faridabad, Haryana)	Bat	Lost	
Mahesh Kumar Raniwal	2014 Indian general election	Kota Lok Sabha constituency (Kota, Rajasthan)	Electric pole	Lost	
Nemichand	2014 Indian general election	Nagaur Lok Sabha constituency (Nagaur, Rajasthan)	Kettle	Lost	
Pandit Sumit Kumar Sharma	2024 Indian general election	Faridabad Lok Sabha constituency (Faridabad, Haryana)		Lost	1,444 (0.09%)
State Legislative Assembly elections
Bhudev Sharma	2013 Delhi Legislative Assembly election	Rohtas Nagar Assembly constituency (Delhi)	Electric pole	Lost	1273 (0.14%)
Vineet Singh	2013 Chhattisgarh Legislative Assembly election	Bilaspur, Chhattisgarh Assembly constituency (Bilaspur, Chhattisgarh)		Lost	116 (0.08%)
Sanjay Sharma	2014 Haryana Legislative Assembly election	Ballabgarh Assembly constituency (Ballabgarh, Haryana)	Bat	Lost	
