= Bhartiya Gau Raksha Dal =

Indian Hindutva militant organisation

- Other name: BGRD
- Founder: Pawan Pandit
- Leader: Pawan Pandit
- Founded: 24 August 2012 (14 years ago)
- Ideology: Hindutva
- Political position: Right-wing
- Part of: Sangh Parivar

The Bhartiya Gau Raksha Dal (BGRD; lit. 'Indian Cow Protection Organisation') is an Indian organisation associated with the Hindutva movement and cow protection activism. Involved in the cow protection movement, the group is affiliated with the right-wing Hindutva paramilitary organisation Rashtriya Swayamsevak Sangh (RSS) and is a member of the Sangh Parivar. Founded in 2012 by Pawan Pandit, the BGRD regularly engages in cow vigilante violence against minorities, primarily Muslims and Dalits.

== History ==
=== Background ===
The cow is regarded as sacred in Hinduism. However, in modern India, the promotion of cow protection, through the cow protection movement, arises more from the exclusivist and antagonistic, Hindu fundamentalist, and caste-based aspects of Hindutva, a Hindu nationalist ideology, than from the principle of ahimsa (transl. Non-violence) or genuine religious devotion.

Such a point of honour in our national life is none else but Mother Cow, the living symbol of the Mother Earth — that deserves to be the sole object of devotion and worship. To stop forthwith any onslaught on this particular point of our national honour, and to foster the spirit of devotion to the motherland, [a] ban on cow slaughter should find topmost priority in our programme of national renaissance in Swaraj.

— M. S. Golwalkar

=== Establishment ===
The BGRD was established by Pawan Pandit in 2012. Its members, known as "Gau Rakshaks", are predominantly Brahmins. In 2015, a member of the group was appointed to the cattle protection state committee in Punjab, strengthening the group's influence.

== Activities ==
A vigilante paramilitary organisation, the BGRD has a Gau Commando Force, involving vigilantes patrolling state borders for people smuggling cows and conducting raids on slaughterhouses. The organisation is regularly involved in anti-Muslim and anti-Dalit violence. Despite credible evidence, many of the accused have faced minimal legal consequences. In 2016, it was reported that local police in Haryana were coordinating with cow vigilante groups. The group itself has been criticised by many for its engagement in vigilante policing.

== See also ==
- Cattle slaughter in India
