= Cow protection movement =

South Asian religious and political movement

The cow protection movement is a predominantly Hindu religious and political movement aiming to protect cows, whose slaughter has been broadly opposed by Hindus, Buddhists, Jains, Zoroastrians and Sikhs. While the opposition to slaughter of animals, including cows, has extensive and ancient roots in Indian history, the term refers to modern movements dating back to colonial era British India. The earliest such activism is traceable to Namdhari (Kooka) Sikhs of Punjab who opposed cow slaughter in the 1860s. The movement became popular in the 1880s and thereafter, attracting the support from the Arya Samaj founder Swami Dayananda Saraswati in the late 19th century, and from Mahatma Gandhi in the early 20th century.

The cow protection movement gained broad support among the followers of Indian religions, particularly Hindus, but it was broadly opposed by Muslims. Numerous cow protection-related riots broke out in the 1880s and 1890s in British India. The 1893 and 1894 cow killing riots started on the day of Eid-ul-Adha, a Muslim festival where animal sacrifices are a part of the celebration. Cow protection movement and related violence has been one of the sources of religious conflicts in India. Historical records suggest that both Hindus and Muslims have respectively viewed "cow protection" and "cow slaughter" as a religious freedom.

The cow protection movement is most connected with India, but has been active since colonial times in predominantly Buddhist countries such as Sri Lanka and Myanmar. Sri Lanka is the first country in South Asia to wholly legislate on harm inflicted against cattle. Sri Lanka currently bans the sale of cattle for meat throughout all of the island, following a legislative measure that united the two main ethnic groups on the island (Tamils and Sinhalese), whereas legislation against cattle slaughter is in place throughout most states of India except Kerala, West Bengal, and parts of the North-East.

== Attitudes towards the cow ==
=== Hinduism ===
According to Nanditha Krishna, the cow veneration in ancient India "probably originated from the pastoral Aryans" in the Vedic era, whose religious texts called for non-violence towards all bipeds and quadrupeds, and often equated killing of a cow with the killing of a human being, especially a Brahmana. The hymn 10.87.16 of the Hindu scripture Rigveda (c. 1200–1500 BCE), states Nanditha Krishna, condemns all killings of men, cattle and horses, and prays to god Agni to punish those who kill.

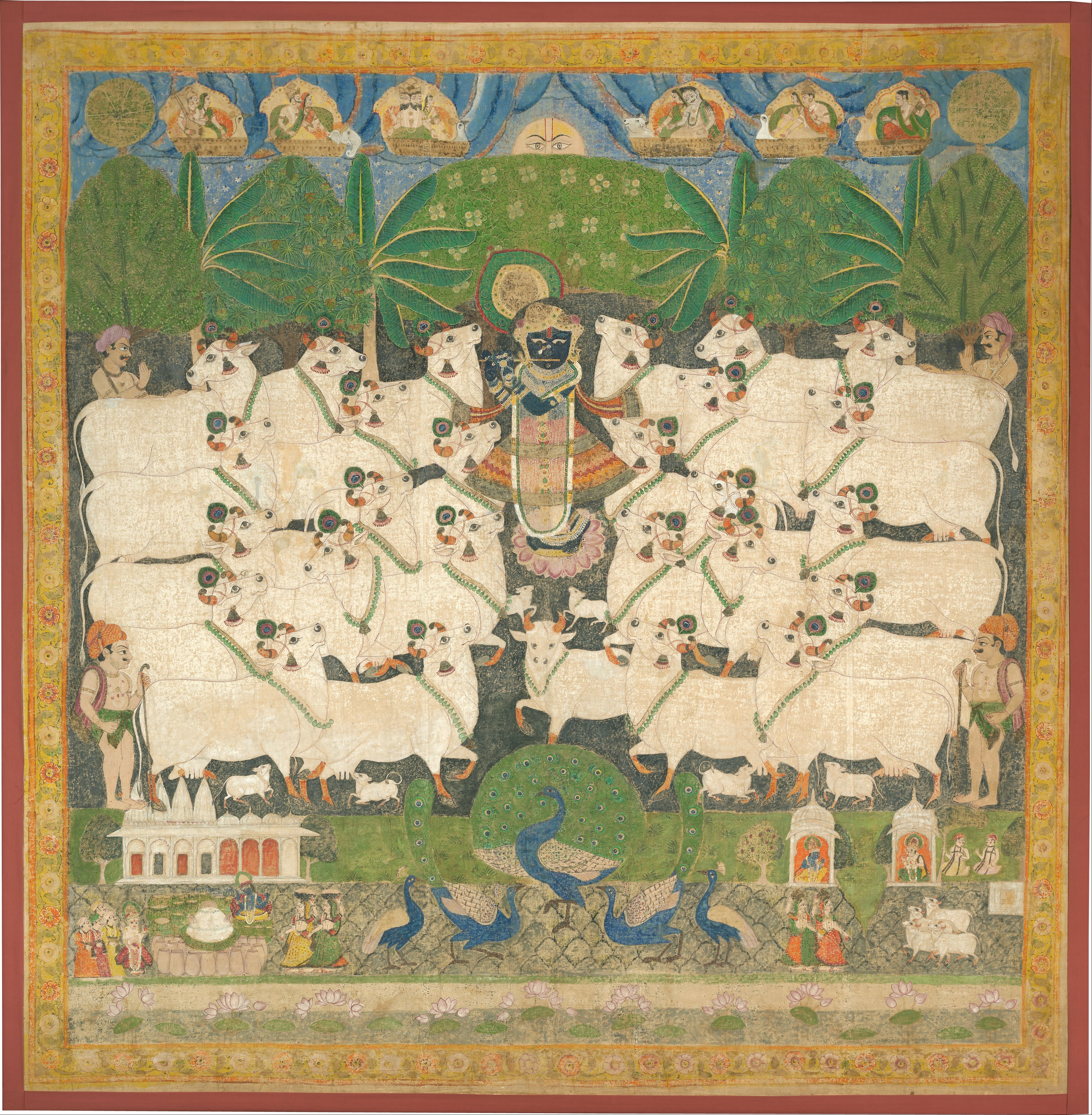
The iconography of popular Hindu deity Krishna often includes cows. He is revered in Vaishnavism.

According to Harris, the literature relating to cow veneration became common in 1st millennium CE, and by about 1000 CE vegetarianism, along became a well accepted mainstream Hindu tradition. This practice was inspired by the belief in Hinduism that a soul is present in all living beings, life in all its forms is interconnected, and non-violence towards all creatures is the highest ethical value. Vegetarianism is a part of the Hindu culture. The god Krishna, one of the incarnations (Avatar) of Vishnu, is associated with cows, adding to its endearment.

Many ancient and medieval Hindu texts debate the rationale for a voluntary stop to cow slaughter and the pursuit of vegetarianism as a part of a general abstention from violence against others and all killing of animals. Some significant debates between pro-non-vegetarianism and pro-vegetarianism, with mention of cattle meat as food, are found in several books of the Hindu epic, the Mahabharata, particularly its Book III, XII, XIII and XIV. It is also found in the Ramayana. These two epics are not only literary classics, but they have also been popular religious classics.

The Mahabharata debate presents one meat-producing hunter who defends his profession as dharmic. The hunter, in this ancient Sanskrit text, states that meat consumption should be allowed because animal sacrifice was practiced in the Vedic age, that the flesh nourishes people, that man must eat to live and plants like animals are alive too, that the nature of life is such every life form eats the other, that no profession is totally non-violent because even agriculture destroys numerous living beings when the plough digs the land. The hunter's arguments are, states Alsdorf, followed by stanzas that present support for restricted meat-eating on specific occasions.

The pro-vegetarianism sections of these Hindu texts counter these views. One section acknowledges that the Vedas do mention sacrifice, but not killing the animal. The proponents of vegetarianism state that Vedic teachings explicitly teach against killing, its verses can be interpreted in many ways, that the correct interpretation is of the sacrifice as the interiorized spiritual sacrifice, one where it is an "offering of truth (satya) and self-restraint (damah)", with the proper sacrifice being one "with reverence as the sacrificial meal and Veda study as the herbal juices". The sections that appeal for vegetarianism, including abstention from cow slaughter, state that life forms exist in different levels of development, some life forms have more developed sensory organs, that non-violence towards fellow man and animals who experience pain and suffering is an appropriate ethical value. It states that one's guiding principle should be conscientious atmaupamya (literally, "to-respect-others-as-oneself").

According to Ludwig Alsdorf, "Indian vegetarianism is unequivocally based on ahimsa (non-violence)" as evidenced by ancient smritis and other ancient texts of Hinduism. He adds that the endearment and respect for cattle in Hinduism is more than a commitment to vegetarianism, it has become integral to its theology. The respect for cattle is widespread but not universal. According to Christopher Fuller, animal sacrifices have been rare among the Hindus outside a few eastern states and Himalayan regions of the Indian subcontinent. To the majority of modern Indians, states Alsdorf, respect for cattle and disrespect for slaughter is a part of their ethos and there is "no ahimsa without renunciation of meat consumption".

=== Jainism ===
Jainism is against violence to all living beings, including cattle. According to the Jaina sutras, humans must avoid all killing and slaughter because all living beings are fond of life, they suffer, they feel pain, they like to live, and long to live. All beings should help each other live and prosper, according to Jainism, not kill and slaughter each other.

In the Jain tradition, neither monks nor laypersons should cause others or allow others to work in a slaughterhouse.

Jains have led a historic campaign to ban the slaughter of cows and all other animals, particularly during their annual festival of Paryushana (also called Daslakshana by Digambara). Historical records, for example, state that the Jain leaders lobbied Mughal emperors to ban slaughter of cow and other animals, during this 8 to 12 day period. In some cases, such as during the 16th century rule of Akbar, they were granted their request and an edict was issued by Akbar.

=== Buddhism ===
The texts of Buddhism state ahimsa to be one of five ethical precepts, which requires a practicing Buddhist to "refrain from killing living beings". Slaughtering cow has been a taboo, with some texts suggest taking care of a cow is a means of taking care of "all living beings". Cattle is seen as a form of reborn human beings in the endless rebirth cycles in samsara, protecting animal life and being kind to cattle and other animals is good karma.

The Buddhist texts not only state that killing or eating meat is wrong, it urges Buddhist laypersons to not operate slaughterhouses, nor trade in meat. Indian Buddhist texts encourage a plant-based diet.

Sacrifice of cattle is particularly condemned in the Brāhmaṇadhammika Sutta of the Sutta Nipata of the Pali Canon, where cows are referred to in the following terms:

Like a mother, father,

brother, or other relative,

cows are our foremost friends.

From them comes medicine.

They give food, strength,

beauty, & happiness.

The sutta claims that cow sacrifice causes devas and rakshas to cry out 'An injustice' when a knife falls upon a cow who is sacrificed.

=== Sikhism ===
During the 1860s, the Namdhari Sikhs opposed cattle-slaughter. According to a Khalsa Bahadur (Lahore) article dated to 5 September 1903, the Sikhs consider cattle to be a useful animal but do not go to the lengths of the Hindus by considering it to be sacred. According to Arvind-Pal Singh Mandair, many Sikhs refrain from eating beef as cows, oxen, and buffalo are a central part of the livelihood of rural Sikhs, with many Sikhs coming from agricultural-backgrounds. Thus, Sikhs generally respect cattle and do not slaughter them for food.

=== Zoroastrianism ===
The term geush urva means "the spirit of the cow" and is interpreted as the soul of the earth. In the Ahunavaiti Gatha, Zarathustra (or Zoroaster) accuses some of his co-religionists of abusing the cow.

The lands of Zarathustra and the Vedic priests were those of cattle breeders. The 9th chapter of the Vendidad of the Avesta expounds the purificatory power of gōmēz – cow urine. It is declared to be a panacea for all bodily and moral evils, understood as which it features prominently in the 9-night purification ritual Barashnûm.

=== Christianity ===
There are no explicit food restrictions in Christianity though groups that follow the rulings of the Apostolic Council refrain from consumption of blood, meat containing blood, meat of animals that have been sacrificed to idols and the meat of animals that were strangled: "the Holy Spirit and we ourselves have favored adding no further burden to you, except these necessary things, to abstain from things sacrificed to idols, and from blood, and from things strangled, and from fornication. If you carefully keep yourselves from these things, you will prosper." (Acts 15:27–28). When speaking about the consumption of pork and other meats regarded as unclean in the Old Testament, Christ says: "And he saith unto them, Are ye so without understanding also? Do ye not perceive, that whatsoever thing from without entereth into the man, it cannot defile him; Because it entereth not into his heart, but into the belly, and goeth out into the draught, purging all meats?." Mark 7:18-19.

The diet rules, states Tanya MacLaurin, vary among Christian denominations, with most not advocating any restrictions. According to David Grumett, Rachel Muers and other scholars, many Christian saints and preachers of Christianity such as Charles Spurgeon, Ellen G. White, John Todd Ferrier, and William Cowherd practiced and encouraged a meat-free diet. Devout Catholics and Orthodox Christians avoid meat on Fridays and particularly during Lent, states MacLaurin.

=== Judaism ===
According to the Bible, the Israelites adored a cult image of a golden calf when the prophet Moses went up to Mount Sinai. Moses considered this a great sin against the God and it is the explanation for the priest role Levites had. A cult of golden calves appears later during the rule of Jeroboam.

According to the Hebrew Bible, an unblemished red cow was an important part of ancient Jewish rituals. The cow was sacrificed and burned in a precise ritual, and the ashes were added to water used in the ritual purification of a person who had come in to contact with a human corpse. The ritual is described in the Book of Numbers in Chapter 19, verses 1–14.

Observant Jews study this passage every year in early summer as part of the weekly Torah portion called Chukat. A contemporary Jewish organization called the Temple Institute is trying to revive this ancient religious observance.

Traditional Judaism considers beef kosher and permissible as food, as long as the cow is slaughtered in a religious ritual called shechita, and the meat is not served in a meal that includes any dairy foods.

Some Jews committed to Jewish vegetarianism believe that Jews should refrain from slaughtering animals altogether and have condemned widespread cruelty towards cattle on factory farms.

=== Islam ===
According to the verses of the Quran, such as 16:5–8 and 23:21–23, God created cattle to benefit man and recommends Muslims to eat cattle meat, but forbids pork.

Cattle slaughter had been and continued to be an approved practice among the followers of Islam, particularly on festive occasions such as the Eid-ul-Adha, except the cows which are pregnant or ill or wounded.

Muslims sacrifice cows during the Eid-ul-Adha festival. Although goat slaughter is an available alternative for the festival, according to Peter van der Veer, Muslims [in India] have considered it "imperative not to bow down to Hindu encroachments on their 'ancient' right to sacrifice cows on Bakr-Id".

== History in India ==
There can be little doubt, states Peter van der Veer, "that protection of the cow already had a political significance in India before the [colonial era] British period". The Mughal emperor Akbar banned the killing of cow. After the collapse of the Mughal Empire, cow slaughter was a capital offense in many Hindu and Sikh ruled regions of the subcontinent. The East India Company continued the ban on cow slaughter in many domains. Henry Lawrence, after the British annexed Punjab, banned cattle slaughter in it in 1847, in order to win the popular Sikh support. In the 1857 revolt, the Muslim emperor Bahadur Shah II threatened to execute any Muslim caught sacrificing a cattle during Bakr-Id. The independence leader of India, Mahatma Gandhi, championed cow protection. Later in 1970's Indian Prime Minister, Indira Gandhi launched the Gosamrakshana.

=== Spread of the movement ===
In the 1870s, cow protection movements spread rapidly in the Punjab, the North-West provinces, Awadh and Rohilkhand. Arya Samaj had a tremendous role in skillfully converting this sentiment into a national movement. Vijaypal Baghel has been dedicating to save cow and conducting a mass movement in the northern India.

The first Gaurakshini sabha (cow protection society) was established in the Punjab in 1882. The movement spread rapidly all over North India and to Bengal, Bombay, Madras and other central provinces. The organisation rescued wandering cows and reclaimed them to groom them in places called gaushalas (cow refuges). Charitable networks developed all through North India to collect rice from individuals, pool the contributions, and re-sell them to fund the gaushalas. Signatures, up to 350,000 in some places, were collected to demand a ban on cow sacrifice.

The cow protection societies petitioned that the cows are essential economic wealth because "these animals furnish bullocks for agriculture, manure for enriching the soil, and give milk to drink and feed the owner", states Tejani. Further, these societies stated that cow slaughter be banned in British India for public health and to prevent further famines and reduce price inflation in agriculture produce, and that such a policy would benefit Christians, Hindus and Muslims simultaneously. By the late 1880s, bands of cow protection activists would seize cows on their way to slaughterhouses and cattle fairs and take them to cow shelters. During the religious riots of the 1890s, those who slaughter cows and eat beef were denounced in public meetings.

=== Arya Samaj ===
Arya Samaj and its founder Dayananda Saraswati were one of the early supporters of the cow protection movement.

Dayananda Saraswathi published the Gokarunanidhi (Ocean of mercy to the cow) in 1881. It strongly opposed cow slaughter. According to Śekhara Bandyopādhyāẏa, during Dayananda's time, cow protection movement was initially not overtly anti-Muslim, but gradually became a source of communal tension. Many cow protection leaders also insisted that their cause was neither religious, nor motivated by prejudice.

=== Religious antagonism ===
According to Shabnum Tejani, the cow dispute has been overwhelmingly interpreted as evidence of "fundamental antagonism between Hindus and Muslims". The cow protection societies were careful in their public statements, states Tejani, but an "anti-Muslim sentiment" was a part of their movement. This is evidenced by the brochures and pamphlets they distributed in the 1880s and 1890s to mobilize support for cow protection. For example, a common theme were illustrations and posters of a "villainous Muslim stalking the god-fearing Brahman and his gentle cow"; often the Muslim was depicted with a long sword. Dramas were staged that depicted Muslims secretly abducting cows and then sacrificing them at Bakr-Id. The movement even set up tribunals to prosecute Hindus who sold cows to Muslims or the British.

After the 1893 major cow-related riots, the response of some Hindus to Muslim view on cow-protection was to blame "the unfortunate ignorance and fanaticism of the uneducated members of the Mahomedan community", states Tejani. The response of Muslims to Hindu opinions, add Tejani, was equally stark. Muslim volunteers went around distributing pamphlets and raising community funds to defend Muslims arrested during cow-killing riots of the 1890s. These stated that "Hindus have begun rebellion and had without rhyme or reason become enemies of our life and property, honour and reputation... we are forbidden to make sacrifices - Hindus interfere in our legitimate luxury". A ban on cow sacrifice, stated these Muslims, is a beginning not only of an end to their right to animal sacrifice, but "tomorrow from their even proclaiming the hour of prayer and the day after from praying altogether".

=== Colonial era laws ===
The section 295 of Indian Penal Code, enacted as the British India's colonial state law, stated that "anyone who destroys, damages or defiles any place of worship or any object held sacred by a class of persons", either by intent or knowledge that such an action would cause insult to the religion of those persons, was to be arrested and punished by imprisonment. In 1888, the High Court of the North Western Provinces (now part of Uttar Pradesh) declared that cow is not a "sacred object".

Sandra Freitag states that this ruling dramatically accelerated cow protection movement, because people believed that the state had selectively denied a religious right to them, while Muslims believed that the state had affirmed their right to sacrifice a cow on Eid-ul-Adha festival. Individuals and local groups began providing cow protection when the state refused to recognize what they considered sacred. According to Freitag, thousands of people would block roads, seize cows from butchers and take them to shelters. In other cases, crowds "as large as 5,000 to 6,000 people" would march for hours to gather before Muslim landlords to pressure the landlord from proceeding ahead with cow slaughter on a Muslim festival. Some groups would hold mock trials of those accused of cow sacrifice or those who sold the cow for sacrifice, simulating the colonial era court procedures, then sentencing those they declared guilty.

=== Violence ===
Cow-protection-related violence is perpetrated by individuals or groups for the purposes of protecting cows and related cattle from slaughter or theft. Numerous cow-related Hindu-Muslim riots broke out between 1900 and 1947, in different parts of British India, particularly on Islamic festival of sacrifice called Eid-ul-Adha, killing hundreds. After the Partition of the Indian subcontinent into a Hindu-majority India and Muslim-majority Pakistan, one of the significant triggers of riots, the killings of Hindus and Muslims, and other violence in the 1950s and 1960s was cow slaughter.

==== Before 1800s ====
Under the Scindia of Gwalior state and the Sikh Empire, people were executed for killing cows.

The "Holi Riot" of 1714 in Gujarat was in part cow-related. A Hindu had attempted to start the spring festivities of Holi by burning a public Holika bonfire, a celebration that his Muslim neighbors objected to. The Muslims retaliated by slaughtering a cow in front of the Hindu's house. The Hindus gathered, attacked the Muslims, seized the Muslim butcher's son and killed him. The Muslims, aided by the Afghan army, sacked the neighborhood, which led Hindus across the city to retaliate. Markets and homes were burnt down. Many Hindus and Muslims died during the Holi riot. The cycle of violence continued for a few days devastating the neighborhoods in Ahmedabad. The cow-related violence and riots repeated in the years that followed, though the only documented 18th-century riots in Ahmedabad are of 1714.

==== 1800s ====
According to Mark Doyle, the first cow protection societies on the Indian subcontinent were started by Kukas of Sikhism, a reformist group seeking to purify Sikhism. The Sikh Kukas or Namdharis were agitating for cow protection after the British annexed Punjab. In 1871, states Peter van der Veer, Sikhs killed Muslim butchers of cows in Amritsar and Ludhiana, and viewed cow protection as a "sign of the moral quality of the state". According to Barbara Metcalf and Thomas Metcalf, Sikhs were agitating for the well-being of cows in the 1860s, and their ideas spread to Hindu reform movements.

According to Judith Walsh, widespread cow protection riots occurred repeatedly in British India in the 1880s and 1890s. These were observed in regions of Punjab, United Provinces, Bihar, Bengal, Bombay Presidency and in parts of South Myanmar (Rangoon). The anti-Cow Killing riots of 1893 in Punjab caused the death of at least 100 people. The 1893 cow killing riots started during the Muslim festival of Bakr-Id, the riot repeated in 1894, and they were the largest riots in British India after the 1857 revolt.

Riots triggered by cow-killings erupted in Lahore, Ambala, Delhi, United Provinces, Bihar and other places in the late 19th century. In Bombay alone, several hundred people were killed or injured in cow-related violence in 1893, according to Hardy. One of the issues, states Walsh, in these riots was "the Muslim slaughter of cows for meat, particularly as part of religious festivals such as Bakr-Id". The cow protection-related violence were a part of larger communal riots, religious disputes, and class conflicts during the colonial era.

Elsewhere, in 1893 there were riots in Azamgarh and Mau, in eastern Uttar Pradesh. The Azamgarh riots were born out of administrative disputes regarding cow slaughter. Reportedly an inexperienced British officer (Henry Dupernex) ordered Muslims to register with the police, if they wished to slaughter cows for Eid al-Adha. Many of the Muslims interpreted the order as an invitation to sacrifice.

In the town of Mau, there were riots in 1806, states John McLane, that had led to Sadar Nizamat Adawlat to prohibit cow sacrifices in 1808. The Hindus had interpreted this to mean a prohibition to all cattle slaughter. In early 19th-century the prohibition was enforced in a manner Hindus interpreted it. However, in the 1860s, the interpretation changed to Muslim version wherein cattle sacrifice was banned in 1808, but not cattle slaughter. This, states McLane, triggered intense dissatisfaction among Hindus. Mau, with nearly half of its population being Muslim, resisted Hindu interpretation. When a "local Muslim zamindar (landowner) insisted on sacrificing an animal for his daughter's wedding", a group of local Hindus gathered to object, according to McLane. Four thousand men from Ballia district and two thousand from Ghazipur district joined the Hindus in Mau to stop the sacrifice in 1893. They were apparently motivated by the belief that cows had not been killed in Mau since Akbar's time, but the British were now changing the rules to allow cow killing in new locations. The cow-protecting Hindus attacked the Muslims and looted a bazaar in Mau. The British officials estimated seven Muslims were killed in the riots, while locals placed the toll at 200.

==== 1900–1947 ====
Cattle protection-related violence continued in the first half of the 20th century. Examples of serious cow protection agitation and riots include the 1909 Calcutta riot after Muslims sacrificed a cow in public, the 1912 Faizabad riots after a Maulvi taunted a group of Hindus about a cow he was with, the 1911 Muzaffarpur riot when in retribution for cow slaughter by Muslims, the Hindus threatened to desecrate a mosque. In 1916 and 1917, over the Muslim festival of Eid-ul-Adha, two riots broke out in Patna with widespread rioting, looting and murders in major cities of Bihar. The British officials banned cow slaughter during Muslim Id festival of sacrifice. According to British colonial records, Hindu crowds as large as 25,000 attacked Muslims on Id day, violence broke out at multiple sites simultaneously, and local authorities were unable to cope. Many serious anti cow slaughter and cow protection-related riots broke out between 1917 and 1928 across India particularly on Muslim festival of sacrifice, from Punjab through Delhi to Orissa, leading to the arrests of hundreds.

In the 1920s, over 100 riots, 450 deaths and 5,000 injuries were recorded in Bengal which was divided in 1947 into East Pakistan and West Bengal. Two primary causes of the violence, states Nitish Sengupta, were Hindus Durga Puja processions playing music which continued as they passed near Muslim mosques, and Muslims killing cows in open during Eid-ul-Adha.

In 1946, rumors spread in Bengal that Hindus had secretly conspired to stop cow sacrifice on Eid-ul-Adha by bringing in Sikhs and arms into their homes. On the day of Islamic festival of sacrifice (September 1946), states Batabyal, the rumor spread among the Bengali Muslims congregated in mosques. The crowd coming out of the mosques then raided a large number of Hindu homes trying to find the arms and the Sikhs. Violence continued for about a week with "frequent instances of stray killings" and looting.

==== 1947–2014 ====
After the 1947 Partition of the Indian subcontinent into Pakistan and India, frequent riots and fatal violence broke in newly created India over cow slaughter. Between 1948 and 1951, cow slaughter led to a spate of riots broke out in Azamgarh, Akola, Pilbhit, Katni, Nagpur, Aligarh, Dhubri, Delhi and Calcutta. Riots triggered by slaughter of cows continued in rural and urban locations of India in the 1950s and 1960s. According to Ian Copland and other scholars, it was the practical stop of cow sacrifice ritual as Islamic festivals after 1947 that largely led to a reduction in riots from the peak observed just before India's independence. However, they add, the riots re-emerged in the 1960s, when a new generation of Muslims born after the independence reached adolescence, who were less aware of the trauma of religious violence in India of the 1940s, began to assert their rights.

During the 1966 anti-cow slaughter agitation, 100 members of Indian parliament signed a petition for a nationwide ban on cow slaughter. Hindu sadhus (monks) gathered in Delhi to protest against cow slaughter, launched go-raksha (cow protection) agitation and demanded a ban. During a huge procession that was walking towards the parliament to press their demand, before they could reach the parliament, some people began a disturbance and rioting started. These riots killed eight people. Indira Gandhi, the newly nominated Prime Minister, continued her father's policy of no national ban on cow slaughter.

In 2002, five Dalit youths were killed by a mob in Jhajjar district, Haryana after accusations of cow slaughter. The mob were reportedly led by members of the Vishva Hindu Parishad, according to Human Rights Watch. According to People's Union for Democratic Rights, the Vishva Hindu Parishad and the Gauraksha Samiti have defended violent vigilantism around cow protection as sentiments against the "sin of cow-slaughter" and not related to "the social identity of the victims". Various groups, such as the families of the Dalits victims of cow-related violence in 2002, did not question the legitimacy of cow protection but questioned instead the false allegations.

==== Post-2014 ====
There has been a rise in cow protection related violence since the election of the Narendra Modi's Bharatiya Janata Party in 2014. The violence has included notable killings, such as the lynchings at Dadri, Jharkhand and Alwar. According to the Human Rights Watch, the post-2014 violence has included instances of assault, harassment, extortion, and it has targeted Muslims and lower-caste Hindus. According to a Reuters report, citing IndiaSpend analysis, a total of "28 Indians – 24 of them Muslims – have been killed and 124 injured", between 2010 and June 2017 in cow-related violence.

== History in Myanmar ==
In predominantly Buddhist Myanmar, the Cattle Slaughter Act became the local law during the colonial era, and it restricted the killing of cattle. Permission was needed in advance, and violators were subject to prison terms. In 1956, after Buddhism was declared a state religion in the post-colonial nation, the reach of this Act was expanded to "include the possession of any quantity of beef" states Hiroko Kawanami. This law was opposed by the Muslims of Myanmar, who pressed that it is their religious right to make sacrifice offerings on Muslim festivals.

The Burmese Buddhist monk community has historically supported its cow protection movement. The 19th-century Ledi Sayadaw, for example, has been an influential champion of cow protection. His work published in 1885, titled Nwa Metta Sa (or The Letter on Cows) urged social action to protect cows from slaughter. More recently, the monks and Buddhist leader Wirathu of the Ma Ba Tha movement have lobbied Burmese authorities to ban ritual slaughter of cows for the Islamic festival of Eid al-Adha. According to some media reports, the Islamic sacrifice festival has become a flashpoint for Burma's Buddhist nationalists. In 2016, three Muslim men were arrested for illegal procurement of nearly 100 cows for sacrifice. Islamic leaders allege that this discriminates against their religious right to sacrifice cows.

In the Irrawaddy Delta region of Myanmar, various Buddhist organizations such as 969, (Note: Their name "969" is in response to the older Islamic organization in Myanmar called "786". The name 786 is based on the Arabic Abjad numeral system and is a coded reference to the opening passage of the Quran which opens with the words “In the name of Allah, the beneficent, the merciful.” The numerical value of these words in the Arabic Abjad system comes to 786. It is found written on shops, homes and buildings in parts of South Asia and Southeast Asia as a kind of code to denote, "this is a Muslim place." The 969 is based on number of ethical precepts and steps of right living assigned to the Buddha, lay Buddhists and the monks.) Ma Ba Tha, and others have purchased the license to slaughter cattle in the Delta, not to slaughter, but as a strategy to prevent their slaughter by Muslims. The Muslims continued their slaughter without permit and paid bribes to the municipal authorities to overlook their practice. Two members of 969 organization then proceeded to vigilante investigate the illegal operations. They visited a Muslim-owned cow slaughterhouse. Both monks were beaten up by the Muslims and hospitalized. The beating up of the monks became a social media topic and the news spread across the region. Rumors also spread that Muslims were going house-to-house killing people with knives. Leading 969 Buddhist monks from elsewhere gathered in the region, and the situation became tense. The situation normalized when Islamic leaders represented that they were unaware of the permit rules and agreed that Muslims would stop the cow slaughter. The Ma Ba Tha has collected donations from Myanmar's majority Buddhist population to buy cattle slaughter licenses and farmers who wish to sell their cows, and donated these cows to impoverished Buddhists in the north state affected by Buddhist-Muslim violence. The 969 vigilante Buddhists have conducted night raids into Muslim owned business to check compliance of cow slaughter restrictions in Myanmar.

According to media reports, "Buddhist nationalists", "firebrand leaders" and "hardline monks" in various anti-minority Myanmar Buddhist organizations have been campaigning for a complete prohibition of cattle slaughter and have been targeting Muslim cattle smugglers. According to a Myanmar Now report, the 969 organization of Buddhist monks in Myanmar is "extremist" in its attempt to protect the cows.

== History in Sri Lanka ==
The cow is held in high regard and cow protection is an important part of Sinhalese Buddhist culture of Sri Lanka. The Buddhists of Sri Lanka have campaigned for laws to protect the cow with a "halal abolitionist movement" and "anti-cow slaughter movement". The Sri Lankan Buddhists believe that the halal form of ritual killing of cattle by Muslims, where the animal's throat is cut and it bleeds to death, and slaughter in general, is against the Buddhist teaching of compassion towards animals. The Part II of Animals Act of Sri Lanka prohibits the slaughter of cow and cow-calves, allowing local governments to regulate the slaughter in exceptional conditions. The law was originally passed in 1958, amended in 1964.

Sri Lankan lawmakers have tabled stricter laws on cow slaughter. In 2009, parliament discussed an expanded Bill calling for a total ban on the slaughter of cattle. The Bill was introduced by Wijedasa Rajapakse, who added that a ban on cattle slaughter "would affect about 300 to 400 people engaged in the meat business, but would generate thousands of new job opportunities for local youth in the dairy industry", states the Sri Lankan newspaper The Sunday Times. Rajapakse said that the practice of cattle slaughter practice in Sri Lanka is a source of bribery, corruption and counterfeit licences. The demand was responsible for cattle-theft in Sri Lanka, with hundreds of cattle stolen from rural areas.

According to Mohammad Yusoff and Athambawa Sarjoon, the anti-Halal and anti-cattle slaughtering campaigns mark the "reemergence of majoritarian [Buddhist] ethno-religious anti-minority [Muslim] nationalist forces and their intensified anti-minority hatred and violence". These campaigns, they state, are motivated by Buddhist ideology and have "had a severe impact on the religious practice and economic well-being of Muslims".

== Cow slaughter ban initiatives ==
=== India ===
In the 20th century, the movement to ban cow slaughter continued. Many leaders of the Indian National Congress supported it as did Mahatma Gandhi.

In 1955, a senior Congress member of parliament Seth Govind Das drafted a bill for India's parliament for a nationwide ban on cow slaughter, stating that a "large majority of the party" was in favour. India's first Prime Minister Jawaharlal Nehru opposed this national ban on cow slaughter, and threatened to resign if the elected representatives passed the bill in India's parliament. The bill failed by a vote of 95 to 12. Nehru declared that it was individual states to decide their laws on cow slaughter, states Donald Smith, and criticized the ban on cow slaughter as "a wrong step".

Nehru's opposition to the ban laws was largely irrelevant, states Steven Wilkinson, because, under India's Constitution and federal structure, laws such as those on cattle slaughter are an exclusive State subject rather than being a Central subject. State legislatures such as those of Uttar Pradesh, Bihar, Rajasthan and Madhya Pradesh enacted their own laws in the 1950s. In 1958, Muslims of Bihar petitioned the Supreme Court of India that the ban on cow slaughter violated their religious right. The Court unanimously rejected their claim.

In 1966, cow protection groups held large demonstrations in Delhi. The protests were led by Prabhudutt Brahmachari, M. S. Golwalkar, Seth Govind Das, Digvijay Nath and members from Ram Rajya Parishad, Vishva Hindu Parishad and RSS. They demanded greater protection of the cow. The total estimates of the protests varied between 125,000 and 700,000. One of the leaders of the protest called for an attack the Lok Sabha, causing the sadhus to attempt to break the police cordon and commit acts of vandalism against public buildings. In the violence that ensued, eight people were killed, including one policeman.

Some Indian states have expanded their cattle slaughter bans. For example, in March 2015, Maharashtra passed stricter legislation expanded its ban to the slaughter of bulls and bullocks.

=== Sri Lanka ===
The Animals Act of Sri Lanka prohibits the slaughter of cow and cow-calves below age 12, allowing local governments to regulate the slaughter in exceptional conditions. The law was originally passed in 1958, amended in 1964.

The Sri Lankan lawmakers have tabled stricter laws on cow slaughter in its parliament. Buddhist and Hindu activists in Sri Lanka have petitioned its parliament to protect the cow and enforce the ban on slaughter. Members of its Parliament such as Athuraliye Rathana Thero have called it a cause against a "sinful act" that is not only important to the religious sentiments of the Buddhists but also to the long term nutritional needs of Sri Lankan population.

== See also ==
Related Indian topics:

- 1966 anti-cow slaughter agitation
- Diet in Hinduism
- Diet in Sikhism
- Cattle slaughter in India
- Cattle smuggling in India
- Cattle theft in India
- Cow vigilante violence in India
- Bhartiya Gau Raksha Dal
- Govatsa Dwadashi

Related International topics:

- Animal rights
- Horse slaughter
- Religious restrictions on the consumption of pork
- Whale meat
- Food and drink prohibitions
- Carol J. Adams – vegetarian, feminist
- John Wesley – vegetarian, the founder of Christian Methodist denomination
- Sylvester Graham – vegetarian activist, a Presbyterian preacher

Other topics:

- Cattle in religion and mythology
