= DOTO Database =

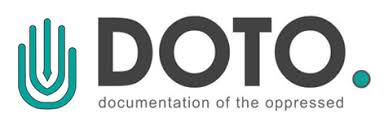
DOTO Database official logo

DOTO Database (Documentation of the Oppressed) is an online portal with data on religious identity based hate-crime against minorities that has happened in India since 2014. The website was launched on 7 March 2018 at Constitution Club of India, New Delhi. The inauguration ceremony was attended by Ram Punyani, Teesta Setalvad, Zafar ul Islam Khan, John Dayal, Ravi Nair. Saba Naqvi and other social activists.

Documentation of the Oppressed is an independent, non-profit documentation center based in New Delhi. It is run by a network of civil society organizations, both at the national and at the grass-root level like Quill Foundation, Human Rights Watch, Amnesty International, CHRI, People's Union for Civil Liberties and others.

DOTO Database functions both as a tracker of violence, and a site for in-depth narratives. The database mixes a crowd-sourcing model with its own investigative and editorial teams.

== Principles and objectives ==
Over the years, there has been a marked increase in the violence conducted against certain sections of society. This violence manifests itself in different forms; it can be through organized and institutional violence by the State or through the actions of allied groups in furtherance of their internalized biases.

The primary objective of the DOTO Database is to create a common documentation platform for the civil society to report hate crime incidents happening across India. This database documents all verifiable incidents of targeted violence against specific communities as reported in English and Urdu media as well as fact-finding and civil society reports. It also provides a platform for in-depth narratives. DOTO aims to increases media reportage through an amalgamation of a crowd-sourcing model along with its own investigative and editorial teams. It is an easy-to-use model and ultimately seeks to make essential information accessible to all. It addresses a number of issues such as the systemic violation of fundamental rights, the erosion of constitutional values and the deployment of hate towards religious minorities in India.

== The team ==
The DOTO project has two independent teams dedicated to the task: The executive team and the editorial group.

The Executive Team is formed by a group of young lawyers, criminologists, and social workers dedicated to the task of documenting religious hate crime. the tasks of this team include establishing the on-ground networks, training community persons, conducting fact-finding exercises, verifying information, and undertaking selective advocacy.

The Editorial Team consists of a set of senior media persons and academics. The people in this team have the final say on the cases. The members of the editorial team receive verified input from the executive team and take a call on the journalistic quality of the cases.
