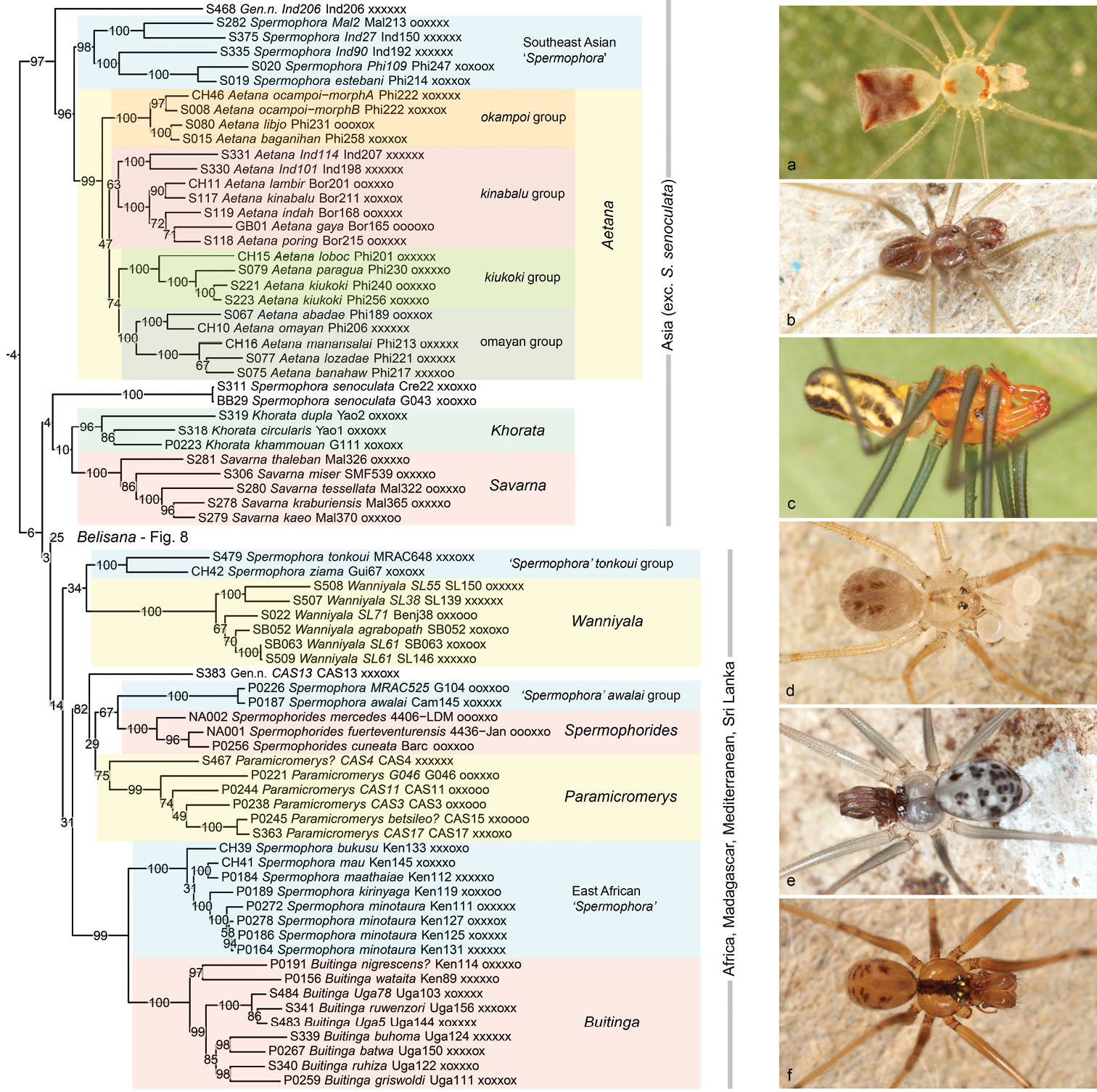

Scientific classification
- Kingdom: Animalia
- Phylum: Arthropoda
- Subphylum: Chelicerata
- Class: Arachnida
- Order: Araneae
- Infraorder: Araneomorphae
- Family: Pholcidae
- Genus: Savarna; Huber, 2005

Type species
- S. thaleban Huber, 2005

Species
- 10, see text

= Savarna =

Genus of spiders

Savarna is a genus of Southeast Asian cellar spiders that was first described by B. A. Huber in 2005.

== Species ==
As of October 2021 it contains ten species, found only in Indonesia, Malaysia, and Thailand:

- Savarna bannang – Yao & Li, 2020 – Thailand
- Savarna chiangmai – Yao & Li, 2020 – Thailand
- Savarna huahin – Yao & Li, 2020 – Thailand
- Savarna kaeo – Huber, Petcharad & Bumrungsri, 2015 – Thailand
- Savarna kraburiensis – Wongprom & Wiwatwitaya, 2015 – Thailand
- Savarna miser – (Bristowe, 1952) – Malaysia, Indonesia (Sumatra)
- Savarna satun – Yao & Li, 2020 – Thailand
- Savarna tesselata – (Simon, 1901) – Thailand
- Savarna thaleban – Huber, 2005 (type) – Thailand
- Savarna thungsong – Yao & Li, 2020 – Thailand

== See also ==
- List of Pholcidae species
