= Cattle theft in India =

Cattle theft, more commonly cattle raiding or cattle lifting, is a property crime in India. In the ancient and medieval era India texts, stealing cattle is described as a crime and sin, a motif that appears in Hindu mythologies.

In the colonial and postcolonial eras, it has been a common crime but one marked with contradictions. (Note: "(Preface:)Cattle theft was a common crime in British India, and yet one marked by contradictions. While the protection of property was for many a defining feature of the modern state, colonial administrators were often loath to interfere in the negotiations by which Indians commonly arranged the return of stolen cattle. ... (p. 35) Cattle and buffaloes (which were often lumped together in official discussions of this crime) were critical to the practice of agriculture in much of north India, particularly in those areas where animal power was needed to operate wells for irrigation. British officials thus recognised early on the importance of cattle ownership as a critical adjunct of the establishment of a productive agricultural economy, and of clear, revenue-paying rights to land.") According to David Gilmartin, the crime of cattle theft was perceived by the colonial-era British officials as a "potential political danger" that threatened "to corrupt the whole structure of the administration, for its pervasiveness threatened to undercut the position of the state as the protector and legal guarantor of the individual as a productive owner of revenue-producing property". In contemporary times, the demand for meat has led to cattle becoming a target of mass-theft. According to The New York Times and other sources, cattle theft for beef production is a lucrative business in India.

India has over 30,000 illegal slaughterhouses that operate in filthy conditions. According to The New York Times, cattle theft is partly a source of supplies to illegal slaughterhouses.

== Mythology, rituals and texts ==
Ancient myths in India such as those found in the Vedas mention cattle raiding, where it is described in terms of cosmogonic significance. These cow-theft myths trigger war and a cycle of retaliations such as in the story of Parashurama, a warrior Brahmin avatar of Hindu god Vishnu, who kills numerous Kashatriyas (warrior caste) after the theft of his father's mythical cow by the king.

In the Ramayana, states Alf Hiltebeitel, a myth speaks of the sins of "murdering children, sages and cows" leading to war, migration of communities and social upheaval. The story, states Hiltebeitel, not only condemns the murder of a sage and the theft of a cow, but also extends its analogy between calves and children. The Kamadhenu and Vasistha-Visvamitra conflict legend found in the Ramayana, states Adheesh Sathaye, is based on cattle theft motif, where Visvamitra fails to steal the mythical cow, repents and transforms himself into a Brahmin sage.

Cattle are mentioned in the Vedas more often than any other animals. In the Rigveda, the term Gavisti is mentioned in the context of conflict or battle, and this may be related to cattle raids state Macdonell and Keith. The penalty for injuring a bull was ten cows, according to Calvin Schwabe, for the theft of a cow, death. Stealing a cow, states Patrick Olivelle, is one of the crimes and sins in Manusmriti. (Note: According to Olivelle, "This ideology as developed in later Dharmasastras links specific sins to [rebirth as] specific animal bodies. Manu has a long and specific list of animal wombs (and even plants) entered by people committing specific sins and crimes: (...) by stealing a cow, a monitor lizard (...)".)

== History ==
Cattle looting is mentioned as a form of warfare among pastoral peoples in the history of India. (Note: "in dry arid deserts like the Thar it would have been moveable wealth that was more desirable than control over unproductive land. The looting of cattle was a form of warfare, locally addressed as dhads, involving rival Rajput groups and had been used to augment cattle wealth as well as to settle social and political disputes.") Competitive raiding a means to show prowess by youth and community solidarity in colonial era Punjab. (Note: "David Gilmartin has demonstrated that in nineteenth century Punjab cattle stealing was undertaken by young men to show their prowess. It was a practice associated with protection of clan livelihood as well as clan honour. Village headmen as well as clan chiefs along with rassagirs extended protection to networks of cattle theft," I would argue that in the Thar, the ability to carry out such thefts was closely associated with the ability to resolve disputes.) (Note: "Far more important for British officials in (p 36) the nineteenth century, however, were the connections between cattle raiding and the solidarity of local communities. Particularly among pastoral and semi-pastoral groups in the Punjab on the fringes of agricultural settlement, cattle stealing had long involved the competitive raiding of community grazing grounds, and was, as some British officials suggested, a practice associated with the protection of clan livelihood and the defense of community honour. Physically undertaken largely by young men, 'who show off their prowess by lifting the finest animals they hear of', cattle stealing was viewed by many local leaders as far from criminal.)

David Gilmartin states that "cattle were among the most ubiquitous and important forms of moveable property in India, and cattle stealing was among the most prevalent crimes in northern India during the colonial period" in the 19th century. However, adds Gilmartin, cattle thefts in India were "marked by contradictions" with many village and clan chiefs involved in cattle theft networks and shared in the profits in western Punjab. These were recognized by the colonial government as "key administrative intermediaries". The crime came to be known as "cattle lifting" (like shop lifting), and it was practiced by thieves, by organized mafia and by armies during conquest. Cattle theft were a source of riots and civil disturbances. Hundreds of riots erupted in colonial India over cow slaughter. The village "muqaddam" (chiefs) pursued peace in the village, and British administrators added laws aimed at preventing cattle theft.

According to Ramnarayan Rawat, a professor of South Asian History, cattle theft (or languri) was the "most widely reported crime investigated by the Uttar Pradesh police in the 1880s and 1890s, and was considered the most organized and widespread agricultural crime because cows were regarded as the most valuable animal in Indian society." The convicted cattle thieves were from various Hindu castes such as Thakurs, Rajputs, Kurmis, Brahmins, Chamars, as well as Muslims. During this period and through the early part of 20th-century, the British administration routinely accused Chamars (untouchables, Hindus) of large-scale cattle deaths by poisoning and of theft for the purposes of obtaining skins for leather trade. According to Rawat, these accusations were "standard bureaucratic response" that continued after the British rule ended.

In 1930, an elderly Hindu woman alleged that Bengali Muslims had stolen her bullock, for sacrifice during the Islamic festival of Bakri-Id, when she saw her bullock in the Digboi market place. Hindus with sticks and Muslims with stones collected, triggering waves of riots in this part of Assam, accompanied by looting and killings.

According to David H. Bayley, a professor of Criminal Justice, the crime of "cattle theft is a matter of deadly seriousness in India," because it is an agrarian society where "many people live on the cheerless threshold of starvation". Cattle, states Bayley, are as important as children and grown adults "weep bitterly over the loss of their stock". In 1963 alone, over 20,000 cases of cattle thefts and arrests were reported in India.

== Contemporary situation ==
The above graphs show: (a) the amount of cattle theft in India per 100,000 people, also called the rate, during the years 1953–2015 (shown in colour seagreen) and (b) the share (as percentage) of cattle theft in total major (cognizable) crime during the same period (shown in colour orchid). The graphs are based on tables of statistics from NCRB reports 1953–2015, India.

According to Roshan Kishore, writing in Live Mint, analysis of data published by India's National Crime Records Bureau shows that the proportion of cattle theft in overall theft in India declined during the period 1990–2014 both in the number of incidents reported and the value of the property taken.

View source data.

The above graph shows the annual numbers of reported cattle theft in India during the years 1953–2015, also based on tables of statistics from NCRB reports 1953–2015, India.

A 2013 report by Gardiner Harris's in the Delhi Journal of The New York Times stated that cattle theft had increased in recent times in New Delhi, linked to an increase in the consumption of meat among Indians. The meat was primarily chicken, but included beef. Harris argued that cattle were left free to roam the streets, making them easy targets. According to The Hindu newspaper, analysis of data published by India's National Sample Survey 2016 shows that less than one per cent of Hindus in the Hindi belt consume beef or buffalo meat. Over the ten-year period, 1999–2000 to 2011–2012, the consumption of beef or buffalo meat by Hindus in India declined from 19 million to 12.5 million.

According to The New York Times, organized mafia gangs pick up the cattle they can find and sell them to illegal slaughterhouses. These crimes are locally called "cattle rustling" or "cattle lifting". According to media reports, India has numerous illegal slaughterhouses. For example, in the state of Andhra Pradesh, the officials in 2013 reported over 3,000 illegal slaughterhouses. According to Nanditha Krishna, there are an estimated 30,000 such illegal slaughter sites in India, typically operating in filthy conditions. These illegal activities increases during the festival seasons and various religious rituals linked to animal sacrifice because of the shortage and high demand in Indian and International market.

The theft of cattle for slaughter and beef production is economically attractive to the mafias in India. In 2013, states Gardiner Harris, a truck can fit 10 cows, each fetching about 5,000 rupees (about US$94 in 2013), or over US$900 per cattle stealing night operation. In a country where some 800 million people live on less than US$2 per day, such theft-based mafia operations are financially attractive. According to Andrew Buncombe, when smuggled across the border, the price per cattle increases nearly threefold and the crime is even more attractive financially. Many states have reported rising thefts of cattle and associated violence, according to The Indian Express.

== Cattle smuggling in India ==
Cattle smuggling in India is the movement of cattle for slaughter and processing from the states of India where cattle slaughter is illegal to those states where it is legal as well as to neighboring countries such as Bangladesh. It is widespread in India, with some estimates stating that over a million cattle are smuggled every year.

Cattle smuggling, states Jason Cons – a professor of anthropology with publications on India-Bangladesh border communities, is a significant source of communal tension as it implies "transportation of sacred cattle [cow] for slaughter in Muslim meat markets". It is also a source of crimes, violence and has triggered disputes between the border officials at the India-Bangladesh border.

=== Within India ===
According to Frederick Simoons, cattle smuggling was prevalent during the colonial era such as to the Portuguese Goa. It supplied the urban Goan demand for beef. In the post-colonial era, the reports and scale of cattle smuggling is astounding, where cattle is transported every day in thousand of trucks from Ganges Valley region to slaughterhouses in West Bengal in order to produce beef for exports.

Cows are often smuggled from states such as Rajasthan to slaughterhouses elsewhere, states Amrita Basu. Between January 2009 and February 2016, the Rajasthan police registered over 3,000 cases of cow smuggling, arrested nearly 6,000 people for the crime, and seized over 2,700 vehicles used for cattle smuggling over the seven-year period, states a report in The Hindustan Times.

Cattle smuggling in India, states Reena Martins, is an organized and violent criminal network. In Bihar for example, cow smugglers chopped off the fingers of a railway crossing gate guard when he refused to allow smuggling trucks to pass through before a train. Corruption, bribes and cruelty to animals is a routine part of the operation. Martins states that the racket controlled by the "meat mafia" is worth $5 billion in India, and the smuggled cattle are sold for slaughter in khattals with much of the smuggling destined to supply the meat demand in Bangladesh.

The Indian state of Jharkhand expanded its cattle slaughter-related laws in 2005 and has criminalized "killing, cruelty to and smuggling of cows". The Uttar Pradesh state officials announced in 2017 that they will prosecute cattle smugglers under the "NSA, Gangsters Act", which allows authorities to treat anyone caught smuggling cattle under its statutes for organized crime.

=== Bangladesh ===
Smuggling of cattle and other forms of trafficking is widespread across the India-Bangladesh border. Estimates place the number of illegally smuggled to over one million a year. Vested interests across all parties have failed to curb the large scale smuggling, with some Hindus also involved in the cattle smuggling operations. Cattle smuggling and trade is lucrative and it is a key means for the local elites at the India-Bangladesh border for raising money for politics and for acquiring personal wealth.

Cattle smuggling from India into Bangladesh is akin to drug smuggling networks, states Debdatta Chowdhury. A portion of the smuggled cattle – mainly cows and ox – is obtained from the western and northern states of India with predominantly non beef-eating Hindu population, transported across India and smuggled across the West Bengal border to satisfy the demand in the predominantly Muslim Bangladesh. The states which serve as main sources of this smuggled cattle include Uttar Pradesh, Haryana, Punjab, Gujarat, Bihar and Odisha. According to Chowdhury, between 5000 and 15,000 cows are smuggled everyday across the Bangladesh border. The smuggling generates an average of about US$20 per cow in income for the smuggler, about US$7 in bribes for Bangladeshi border officials and about US$8 in bribes for Indian border officials. Another report by Ashish, Patthak and Khan in India Today states that the operation is a well organized racket of smugglers who use bribes, rampant corruption and evade the law almost every day. They smuggle "young and ageing" cattle from India to Bangladesh slaughterhouses, while the payment is handled through hawala black market.

Other sources estimate the cattle smuggling volume at a different level. According to The Sunday Guardian, "cattle smuggling is rampant in Bengal, with an estimated 60,000 heads of cattle being smuggled out of India into Bangladesh, every day" in 2015, but the rate of this smuggling has dropped because of rising surveillance at the international border. The cattle smuggling rate is placed at nearly two million a year by Robert Wirsing and Samir Das in a 2016 report, with an annual value of about US$1.5 billion.

Cattle smugglers, states The Times of India, use dyes to recolor and camouflage the cattle. This makes cattle identification difficult to ease their smuggling across the border, while some groups use grazing pretext to evade the Indian Border Security Force.

Hundreds of thousands of cows, states the British newspaper The Independent in a 2012 article, are illegally smuggled from India into Bangladesh every year to be slaughtered. Gangs from both sides of the border are involved in this illegal smuggling involving an estimated 1.5 million (15 lakhs) cattle a year, and cattle theft is a source of the supply, states Andrew Buncombe. According to a 2014 report by The International Business Times, criminal gangs steal and smuggle cattle from India into Bangladesh, an operation that yields them "hundreds of millions of dollars annually in illicit profits". Not only it hurts the cattle owners, the activity is dangerous as it leads to deaths of the "perpetrators and innocent bystanders", states Palash Ghosh.

According to The New Indian Express, the villagers near the Bangladesh border state that cow thefts in the region increase before and during the Islamic festival of Ramzan and then these are smuggled across the border nearby. The Eid-ul-Zuha, or the Islamic festival of animal sacrifice, increases the demand for sacrificial cattle in Bangladesh and the illegal activity by the cattle smugglers across the porous border from West Bengal through Assam to Tripura, states The Economic Times. Indian border officials have been using various strategies to reduce or end the smuggling across the Bangladesh border. They allege that their Bangladeshi counterparts are not doing as much as they could, states Katy Daigle, to prevent "illegal cross-border smuggling" of cattle. In contrast, some Bangladeshi officials state that cattle smuggling and associated crime would end if India would accept cow slaughter and legalize cow exports for beef production in Bangladesh.

Bangladesh and India share over 4,000 kilometers of border, with many rivers, hills, highways and rural roads. The border is quite porous to goods and people movement. The border security is limited and cattle smuggling is a common crime, states Smruti Pattanaik. According to Zahoor Rather, trade in stolen cattle is one of the important crime-related border issues between India and Bangladesh. A 2017 Rajya Sabha panel led by the Congress leader P. Chidambaram criticized the West Bengal government for its failures related to rampant cattle smuggling to Bangladesh.

Government authorities and local residents in areas surrounding Bangladesh have stated that frequent cattle-smuggling across the border from India is causing an increase in cattle theft." (Note: People living in the border areas in Dhubri district complained that unabated smuggling of cattle resulted in cattle theft."') (Note: The villagers said that the cow thefts in the region increase before and during Ramzan and that the bovines might have been being smuggled across the border which is just 7 km away. "The cow thefts spike before and during Ramzan. The cattle are easily smuggled across through Bangladesh through river and under the barbed wire," said local resident Rajesh Roy.)

Hundreds of thousands of cows, states the British newspaper The Independent in a 2012 article, are illegally smuggled from India into Bangladesh every year to be slaughtered. Gangs from both sides of the border are involved in this illegal smuggling involving an estimated 1.5 million (15 lakhs) cattle a year, and cattle theft is a source of the supply, states Andrew Buncombe. According to a 2014 report by The International Business Times, criminal gangs steal and smuggle cattle from India into Bangladesh, an operation that yields them "hundreds of millions of dollars annually in illicit profits". Not only it hurts the cattle owners, the activity is dangerous as it leads to deaths of the "perpetrators and innocent bystanders", states Palash Ghosh.

(...) the illegal mass-theft of cattle is a huge problem thousands of miles away from the Chisum Trail – on the border between India and Bangladesh. Along the largely porous boundary between Bangladesh and the Indian state of West Bengal, cattle-raids and cattle-smuggling, often conducted by criminal gangs, raise hundreds of millions of dollars annually in illicit profits. The activity is so lucrative and dangerous that it often costs the lives of the perpetrators and innocent bystanders. (...) Bimal Pramanik, an independent researcher in Kolkata, told the Monitor that Bangladesh has an insatiable demand for beef. 'Bangladeshi slaughterhouses cannot source even 1 million cows from within the country. If Indian cows do not reach the Bangladeshi slaughterhouses, there will be a big crisis there,' he said, adding that he estimates three-fourths of all cows slaughtered in Bangladesh originated in India. In this thriving trade, [herds of] cows worth 50 billion rupees are sent across to Bangladesh every year. (...);

== Impact on cattle theft in India ==
Government authorities and local residents in areas surrounding Bangladesh state that frequent cattle-smuggling across the border from India is causing an increase in Cattle theft in India and other crimes:

- According to a 2011 article in The Telegraph, "people living in the border areas in Dhubri district complained that unabated smuggling of cattle resulted in cattle theft".
- According to a 2016 report in The Tribune, "rampant smuggling to Bangladesh had triggered cattle theft in many parts of the state, especially in eastern Assam".
- In West Bengal, rival cattle smuggling gangs have killed and burnt people and cattle alive. According to Clive Phillips, stealing of cattle from northeast India is a source of the smuggled cattle and the operation is "rife with bribes, corruption and murders of rival smuggling gang members".

== Incidents ==
- In November 2015, a man in Manipur was spotted by locals walking with a missing calf. They accused him of theft and lynched him.
- In Uttar Pradesh, four people were arrested after they threw away bovine carcass and confessed to stealing and slaughtering of cattle.
- In March 2016, villagers near Nagpur (Maharashtra) reported 60 thefts of cattle within a year. The cattle owners alleged that gangs were behind the theft and they were selling the stolen cattle to slaughterhouses.
- In January 2017, villagers in Karnataka chased a truck carrying stolen cattle, caught two cattle thieves and handed them over to police. The truck toppled over, killing one of the cows inside the truck.
- Riots broke out in Gujarat when local people discovered a partially decomposed calf head near a road side butcher shop.
- In West Bengal, according to a June 2017 Indian Express report, villagers of Durgapur showed "copies of nearly two dozen police complaints of cow thefts", then claimed that the police asked them to take care of such "petty matters" themselves. Further poor farmers complained of economic calamity from the thefts and a willingness to beat anybody they catch with stolen cattle. In northern region of the state, a gang of about 10 men came in a van in an alleged attempt in a village to steal cows, and a few of them were shot dead after they had entered a cowshed and had already taken cows from two homes.
- In Assam, two Muslim teenagers were killed, after they were caught untying two cows in a pasture and then suspected of trying to steal those cows.
- In Uttar Pradesh, three suspects were caught stealing a buffalo by villagers and beaten up according to an April 2017 report. In June 2017, a farmer was killed by a gang of cattle thieves near Agra at night when the farmer protested.
- In Delhi, a 5-member gang was arrested on charges of cattle theft after tip off and surveillance in July 2017. The police accused the gang of "sedating the cattle, piling more than 10 of them in one vehicle, filling the edge of the vehicle with stones and making two people stand at the back to mislead the police", and they shot at the police when challenged. A cattle theft gang was caught with illegal weapons and was reported to have been involved in over 100 cattle cases.
- On 29 October 2019, three suspected cattle smugglers were reported dead after a crude bomb they were handling exploded. The smugglers used to attach these bombs to the neck of the cattles, to attack the Indian BSF guards.

== See also ==
- Cattle slaughter in India
- Cow protection movement
- Cow protection-related violence
- Article 48 of the Constitution of India
