= Persecution of Dalits =

Caste-based persecution

Persecution and discrimination against Dalits has been observed in the countries such as Bangladesh, India, Pakistan, Nepal, the UK, and the US.

== Bangladesh ==
Most of the Dalits in the rural areas of Bangladesh are landless and live in houses built with straw and mud under a threat of eviction. Dalit women are more affected as they suffer from multiple forms of discrimination.

== India ==
Various approaches to improving the condition of the people known now as the Dalits came during the fight for Indian independence from the British rule. By 1942, the scheduled castes were allowed 8.5% reservation in central and other services. New developments took place after India achieved independence. Since 1950, the country has enacted many laws and social initiatives to protect and improve the socio-economic conditions of its Dalit population.

According to data collected by India's National Crime Records Bureau for the year 2000, 25,455 crimes against Dalits were committed in the year 2000, the latest year for which the data is only available, 2 Dalits are assaulted every hour, 3 Dalit women are raped every day, 2 Dalits are murdered, and 2 Dalit homes are set on fire every day. These figures, however, do not reflect the true extent of crimes against Dalits. Since the caste system, which is based on Hindu religious teachings, is often supported by the police, village councils, and public officials; many crimes go unreported because of fear of retaliation, police harassment, and no trust in the police department. Amnesty International documented a high number of sexual assaults against Dalit women, which were often committed by landlords, upper-caste villagers, and policemen, according to a study published in 2001. In 2022, about 57,582 cases of crimes against SCs were registered, showing an increase of 13.1% from 50,900 cases registered in 2021.

== Nepal ==
Dalits in Nepal continue to face prejudice when entering sacred places, gathering water, social gatherings and are barred from marrying higher castes. Dalit activists say they were promised better rights during the Nepalese Civil War, but these promises are yet to be fulfilled.

== Pakistan ==
A Dawn report in 2016 noted that the Dalits in Sindh, Pakistan continue to face atrocities. While the Dalit men are subjected to everyday violence, the more heinous attacks are aimed at women belonging to scheduled castes.

Dalits in Pakistan have been subjected to forced conversions to Islam.

== United Kingdom ==
A number of Indians in the United Kingdom adhere to the caste system and still seek marriage with individuals who are of similar caste categories. There have been several incidents involving abuse of low caste Dalits, by higher caste individuals in schools and workplaces.

In 2018, the UK government refused to enact a law on caste discrimination among Indians. The Dalit community reacted with displeasure.

== United States ==
A survey on caste discrimination conducted by Equality Labs, a Dalit rights organisation, found 67% of Indian Dalits living in the US reporting that they faced caste-based harassment at the workplace, and 27% reporting physical assault based on their caste. The Carnegie Enowment researchers pointed out that the study used a non-representative snowball sampling method to identify participants, which might have skewed the results in favour of those with strong views about caste.

In 2021, the student body of California State University system, representing half a million students, passed a resolution seeking a ban on caste-based discrimination. The campaign was spearheaded by Prem Pariyar, a Nepali origin Dalit student, who came to the US in 2015 escaping persecution in his home country, and claimed that he faced discrimination in the US as well. For the affected students, casteism is manifested through slurs, microaggressions and social exclusion. The resolution cited the survey by Equality Labs where 25 percent of Dalits reported having faced verbal or physical assaults. Al Jazeera noted that the resolution was authored by a higher caste student and backed by other students from other racial and religious groups.
