= Prabhudutt Brahmachari =

Indian religious teacher (1885-1990)

- Born: 1885
- Died: 11. march 1990

Prabhuduttji Brahmachari was an Indian religious teacher from Vrindavan and who ran a Sanskrit school in Basant gaon, New Delhi. He founded his ashram at Jhusi to organize Kumbh Mela. He became close to Golwalker in nearly 1950 and then Rajendra Singh and Golwalker persuaded him to stand against Nehru on the cow protection platform and against the Hindu Code Bill. In 1951, he openly challenged Jawaharlal Nehru's election to the 1st Lok Sabha from the Phulpur (Lok Sabha constituency), challenging Nehru's stance on the ideology of Hindutva in independent India.
