= CSR =

CSR may refer to:

== Biology and chemistry ==
- Central serous retinopathy, a visual impairment
- Cheyne–Stokes respiration, an abnormal respiration pattern
- Child sex ratio, ratio between female and male births
- Class switch recombination, a process that changes the constant region of an immunoglobulin
- Clinical study report, on a clinical trial
- Combat stress reaction, a condition also known as shell shock or battle fatigue
- C-S-R Triangle theory, an application of the universal adaptive strategy theory to plant biology in which strategies are competitor, stress tolerator, and ruderal
- Chemical shift reagent, for improved chemical shift dispersion in NMR spectroscopy

== Computers ==
- Certificate signing request, in computer security
- Command success rate, a measure of performance in computer speech recognition programs
- Compressed sparse row, a storage format for a sparse matrix
- Control/Status Register, a register in central processing units

== Government ==
- Chinese Soviet Republic, a short-lived state in 20th century China
- Common Sense Revolution, a political movement in Ontario, Canada
- Community service register, a type of police report in India
- Comprehensive School Reform, a program administered by the U.S. Department of Education
- Comprehensive Spending Review, a governmental process in the United Kingdom carried out by HM Treasury
- Cost sharing reductions subsidy, until its elimination in 2017, a primary component of high-deductible health plans under the U.S. Patient Protection and Affordable Care Act (often referred to as Obamacare)
- Czechoslovak Republic, several historical states in Europe

== Organizations ==
- Center for Scientific Review, a center at the National Institutes of Health, US Department of Health and Human Services
- Centre for Software Reliability, UK
- Center for Strategic Research (Iran), a research governmental institute in Iran
- Comités syndicalistes révolutionnaires, a former a trade-unionist organization
- CSR plc, formerly Cambridge Silicon Radio, a British silicon chip designer and software company
- CSR Corporation Limited, a former Chinese manufacturer of locomotive and rolling stock
- CSR Group, a Chinese railway equipment manufacturer
- CSR (Australian company), an Australian industrial company, formerly known as Colonial Sugar Refining Company
- Cutch State Railway, a former Indian railway company

== Psychology ==
- Cognitive science of religion, the study of religious thought and behavior from the perspective of the cognitive and evolutionary sciences
- Cultic Studies Review, a journal on cults, psychology, and religion

== Other ==
- CSR 97.4FM, a radio station in Canterbury, UK
- CSR Racing, a 2012 drag racing game for mobile platforms
- CSR (group), a South Korean girl group
- Team 18, an Australian V8 Supercar team
- C Sports Racer, a class of racing cars
- Cab Secure Radio, a radio telephone system used on UK railways
- C. S. R. Anjaneyulu (1907–1963), an Indian actor
- Canning Stock Route, the longest historic livestock route in the world
- Corn Suitability Rating, a measure of soil quality commonly used in the state of Iowa, US
- Certified shorthand reporter, a court reporter
- Customer service representative, a job title in the service industry
- Cherokee Scout Reservation, a Boy Scout camp in Caswell County, North Carolina
- Cedarlands Scout Reservation, a Boy Scout camp in Long Lake, New York
- Competition Success Review, a youth magazine published in India
- Corporate social responsibility, a concept whereby businesses take responsibility for the impact of their activities
- Complete spatial randomness
- Czechoslovak Socialist Republic, which broke up in 1990
- Central Spine Road, a road in Malaysia
