= First information report =

Type of police document in South Asian and Southeast Asian countries

A first information report (FIR) is a document prepared by police organisations in many South and Southeast Asian countries, including Myanmar, India, Bangladesh and Pakistan, when they receive information about the commission of a cognisable offence, or in Singapore when the police receive information about any criminal offence. It generally stems from a complaint lodged with the police by the victim of a cognisable offence or by someone on their behalf, but anyone can make such a report either orally or in writing to the police, so it is necessary to know about cognisable offences. These are serious criminal offences that pose an immediate danger to society such as murder, rape, or robbery.

For a non-cognisable offence, an entry in a community service register or in the station diary is made.

Each FIR is important as it sets the process of criminal justice in motion. It is only after the FIR is registered in the police station that the police take up investigation of most types of cases. Anyone who knows about the commission of a cognisable offence, including police officers, can file an FIR.

As described in law:

- When information about the commission of a cognisable offence is given orally, the police must write it down.
- The complainant or supplier of the information has a right to demand that the information recorded by the police be read to them.
- Once the information has been recorded by the police, it must be signed by the person giving the information.
- The complainant can get a free copy of an FIR.

An FIR includes the date, time, place, incident details, and a description of the person(s) involved.
