= Comprehensive School Reform =

The Comprehensive School Reform (CSR) program was a program administered by the U.S. Department of Education's Office of Elementary and Secondary Education.

The purpose of comprehensive school reform was "to provide financial incentives for schools to develop comprehensive school reforms, based upon scientifically based research and effective practices that include an emphasis on basic academics and parental involvement so that all children can meet challenging state academic content and academic achievement standards."

The CSR program made its last award in 2005, although it continued to appropriate funds to one school in 2006–2008.

== Elements ==
According to CSR standards, a successful reform program is one that includes all of the following elements in a cohesive way:

- Coordination of resources: This is how the program will bring together the aspects of a school, from local to federal levels.
- Effective research methods and strategies: Comprehensive school reform takes action based upon strategies and methods that have been proven to work through research and reliability.
- Alignment: The methodology imposed works through the community, into homes, and also straight up to our government. This technique is significant as it provides a connection to all things from curriculum to technology.
- Development: Ensuring that the staff, and those who have high influence in the school systems are properly educated and updated on these programs is essential.
- Measurable goals: As the state has set standards, regularly students will be checked to see if they have reached the benchmarks that they should have in order to achieve the goal.
- School support: All associated within the school should be supportive, such as staff, faculty and administrators.
- Involvement: Including the community in the school is very important as the classroom should carry on outside of the room itself. Families are encouraged to be involved, and communities are encouraged to take part in activities.
- External support: Usually there is a higher support system, for example a university, that provides support and expertise in how to improve.
- Evolution: There must always be room for growth and change, and each program should be set with the intent to evolve as time progresses.

== Comprehensive School Reform Demonstration ==
In order to begin the school-wide reform, in 1977 Congress implemented the Comprehensive School Reform Demonstration which reached out to schools that had at least 50 percent student disadvantage and gave them the opportunity to improve to receive program grants. Some of the elements that the CSRD provided were: Professional development for teachers and staff; Greater parental and community involvement in school improvement activities; Identification of resources to sustain the reform effort; measurable goals for student achievement; and annual evaluation of both implementation and student-achievement results.

== No Child Left Behind Act ==
The four pillars of the No Child Left Behind bill include accountability, flexibility, research-based evidence, and parental options. This bill also requires each state to have standards, and perform state testing under federal requirements.

== Models ==
=== Success for All ===
Created in 1987, the Success for All (SFA) reading intensive curriculum has been adopted by about 1,500 schools. It "includes assessment every eight weeks, cooperative-learning activities among students, tutoring for those in need of extra help, and a family-support team that works to increase parental involvement." This model has also been proven to help students read at an above average rate, at younger ages.

=== Direct Instruction ===
Direct Instruction was developed in 1968. This model consists of "field-tested reading, language arts, and math curricula, scripted instructional strategies, extensive training, and schoolwide analysis of student performance data". Through research, this model has been proven to increase both vocabulary and oral readings.

=== New American Schools ===
New American Schools is a non profit organization that develops models to be implemented by low performing schools. Their ideas are comprehensive of the whole school system; i.e., rather than raising up just one educator, all educators come together to create a stronger school unit.

==== Programs ====
Through the Education Performance Network, there are two sets of services: 1. State and District Services, and 2. New School Services. Together they apply four basic components: needs assessment, strategic planning, implementation assistance, and quality assurance and feedback.

== Implementation ==
Success for All has been implemented in schools in 48 states and 4 other countries (SFAF) and Direct Instruction has been implemented in schools in 22 states, Guam, and Australia. Success with these programs can mostly be seen in elementary and younger grade schools.

== See also ==
- Education in the United States
- No Child Left Behind
- Standards-based education
- United States Department of Education
