= Kanmer =

- Archeological site
- Location within India
- Coordinates: 23°25′4.44″N 70°51′48.24″E
- Country: India
- Province: Gujarat
- Time zone: UTC+5.30 (Indian Standard Time)

Kanmer, locally known as Bakar Kot, is an archaeological site belonging to Indus Valley civilization, located in Rapar Taluk, Kutch District, Gujarat, India.

== Excavation ==
An Indo-Japanese joint excavation at Kanmer was undertaken in 2006 by the Institute of Rajasthan Studies, RIHN, JRN Rajasthan Vidyapeeth, Archeology Department, Gujarat and Japanese team.

== Architecture ==
The site was strongly fortified despite being small, perhaps because it may have been located on a trade route between Sindh and Saurashtra.

== Findings ==
A rich ceramic assemblage, representing the Mature Harappan culture, was found at this site. Three clay seals were found, each featuring Indus scripts, as well as central holes allowing them to function as pendants. A large number of bead-making goods — 150 stone beads and roughouts, 160 drill bits, 433 faience beads and 20,000 steatite beads — were found here, indicating the site's importance as an industrial unit. Agate quarries were also located at a distance of 20 kilometres (12 mi) from the site.

== Importance ==
The figures appearing on clay seals and their similarity with those of Mohenjo-daro indicate Kanmer's association with bigger trade centres like Harappa and Mohenjo-daro.
