= National Commission on Cattle =

Agency of the Government of India

National Commission on Cattle is an agency of Government of India set up in 2001 to suggest ways of improving the condition of cattle. The commission then headed by Guman Mal Lodha submitted its report in 2002.

The National Commission on Cattle is not to be confused with the Indian government's National Cow Commission.
