= Cognisable offence =

Classifications of crime

Cognisable offence and non-cognisable offence are classifications of crime used in the legal system of India, Sri Lanka, Bangladesh and Pakistan. Non-cognisable offences includes misbehaviour, public annoyance etc., while cognisable offences are more serious crimes.

== Definition ==
Generally, cognisable offence means an offence in which a police officer has the authority to make an arrest without a warrant and to start an investigation with or without the permission of a court. By contrast, in the case of a non-cognisable offence, a police officer does not have the authority to make an arrest without a warrant and an investigation cannot be initiated without a court order. The police can file a first information report (FIR) only for cognisable offences. In cognisable cases police can make an investigation without prior permission of a magistrate. Cognisable cases are more serious than non-cognisable cases. Normally, serious offences are defined as cognisable and usually carry a sentence of 3 years or more.

For a non-cognisable offence, a community service register is registered instead of a first information report.

== In India ==
In India, crimes like rape and murder are considered cognisable unlike crimes like public nuisance, hurt and mischief. In general, non-cognisable offences are bailable and placed under the First Schedule of the Indian Penal Code (IPC). On 12 November 2013, the Supreme Court of India said it was mandatory for the police to register a First Information Report for all complaints in which a cognisable offence has been discovered.

=== Procedure ===
The Section 154 in the Code of Criminal Procedure, 1973, of India states:

1. Every information relating to the commission of a cognisable offence, if given orally to an officer in charge of a police station, shall be reduced to writing by him or under his direction, and be read over to the informant; and every such information, whether given in writing or reduced to writing as aforesaid, shall be signed by the person giving it, and the substance thereof shall be entered in a book to be kept by such officer in such form as the State Government may prescribe in this behalf.
2. A copy of the information as recorded under sub-section (1) shall be given forthwith, free of cost, to the informant.
3. Any person aggrieved by a refusal on the part of an officer in charge of a police station to record the information referred to in sub-section (1) may send the substance of such information, in writing and by post, to the Superintendent of Police concerned who, if satisfied that such information discloses the commission of a cognisable offence, shall either investigate the case himself or direct an investigation to be made by any police officer subordinate to him, in the manner provided by this Code, and such officer shall have all the powers of an officer in charge of the police station in relation to that offence.

== See also ==
- Community service register
- First information report
