= Community service register =

Register maintained by Indian police

A community service register is a register maintained in every Indian police station for a non-cognisable offence. If the offence is a cognisable offence, then a First Information Report (FIR) is created and registered. A CSR is also called a daily diary report or diary report.

After filing a police complaint, the CSR receipt is used as a proof of filing a complaint in the police station and also for claiming insurance settlements.
