= Tourism in Chhattisgarh =

Tourism is an important part of the economy of the Indian state of Chhattisgarh, India's tenth largest state. The state has many ancient monuments, rare wildlife, carved temples, Buddhist sites, palaces, water falls, caves, rock paintings and hill plateaus.

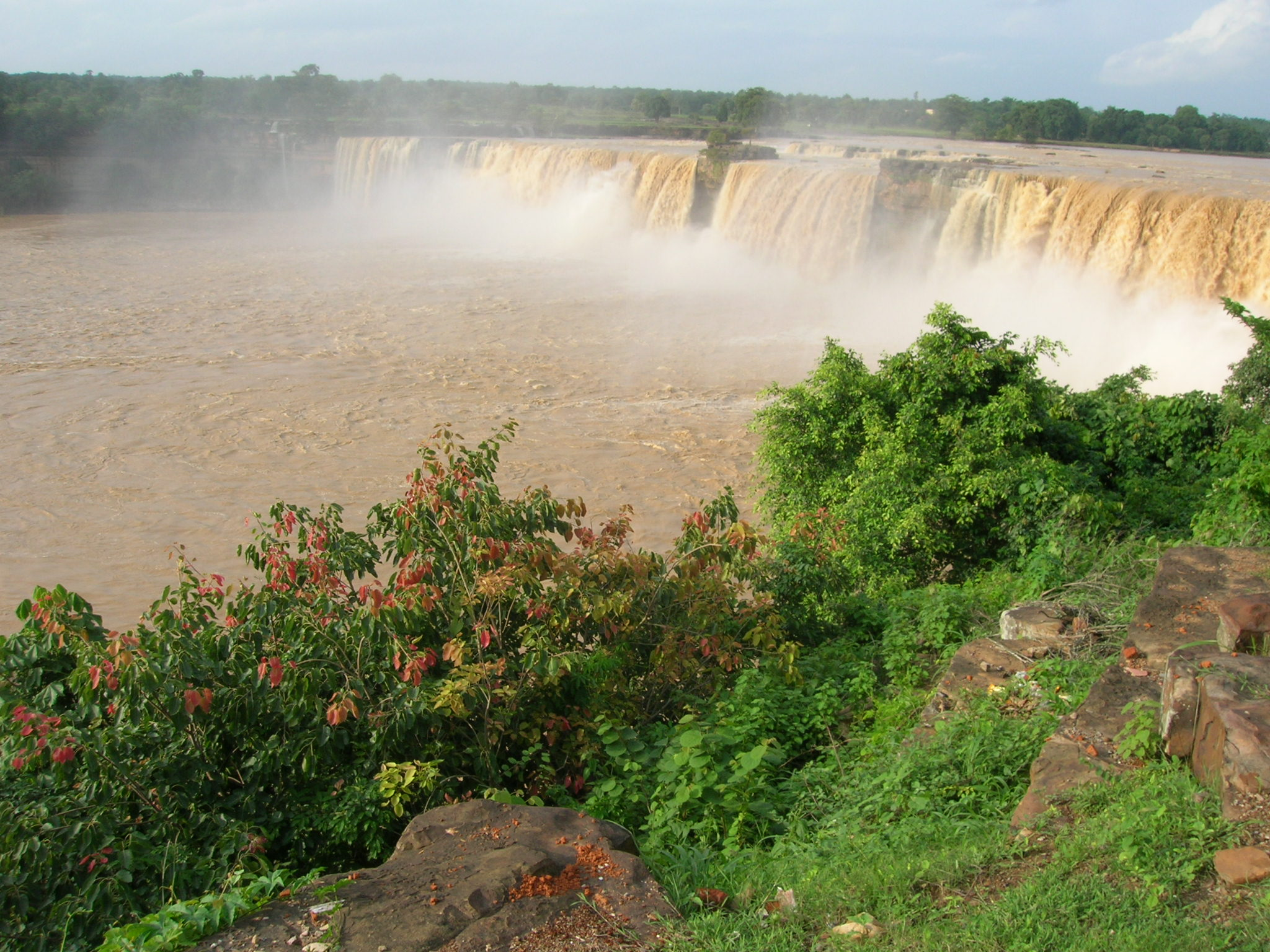
Chitrakot Waterfalls is the broadest waterfall in India and also referred as 'Niagara Falls of India'

The State of Forest Report 2023 published by the Ministry of Environment, Forest and Climate Change, recorded that forest cover accounts for 44.25 percent of the total geographical area of Chhattisgarh.

Located in central India, Chhattisgarh has forests, waterfalls, and wildlife. These include the forests of Bastar and the surroundings of Chitrakote Falls. The state's forest cover accounts for 44.25 percent of its total geographical area, according to the State of Forest Report 2023.

== Waterfalls ==
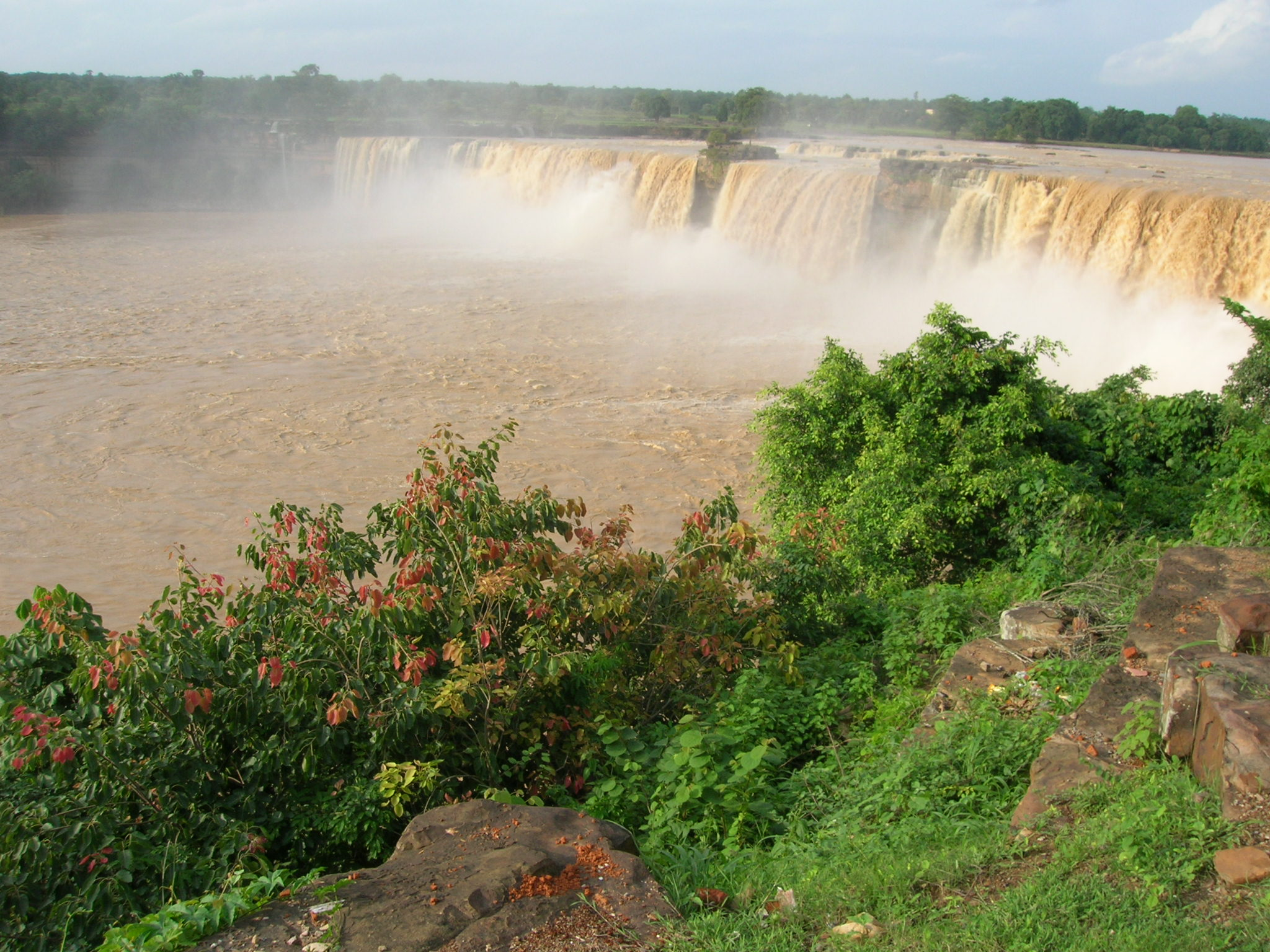
Chitrakot Waterfalls is the broadest waterfall in India and also referred as 'Niagara Falls of India'

Waterfalls are a tourist attraction in the state. Due to the three main physio-graphic division i.e. 1. Northern Hills, 2. Central Plains and 3. Southern Plateaus, Chhattisgarh has numerous perennial and seasonal waterfalls, some of which are listed below:

=== Dantewada District ===
- Saat Dhaar Waterfall
- Jhara Lava Waterfall
- Malangir Waterfall
- Fulpaad Waterfall
- Pondum Falls

=== Kondagaon District ===
- Katulkasa Waterfall, Honhed
- Bijkudum Waterfall, Uper-murvend
- Umradah Waterfall
- Ling-Darha Waterfall (also known as Lim-darha or Lingo-darha WF)
- Amadarha-1 Waterfall
- Amadarha-2 Waterfall
- Hankhi-kudum Waterfall
- Ghumur Waterfall
- Kudarwahi Waterfall
- Uperbedi Waterfall
- Mirde Waterfall
- Mutte-Khadka Waterfall
- Cherbeda Waterfalls

=== Bastar District ===
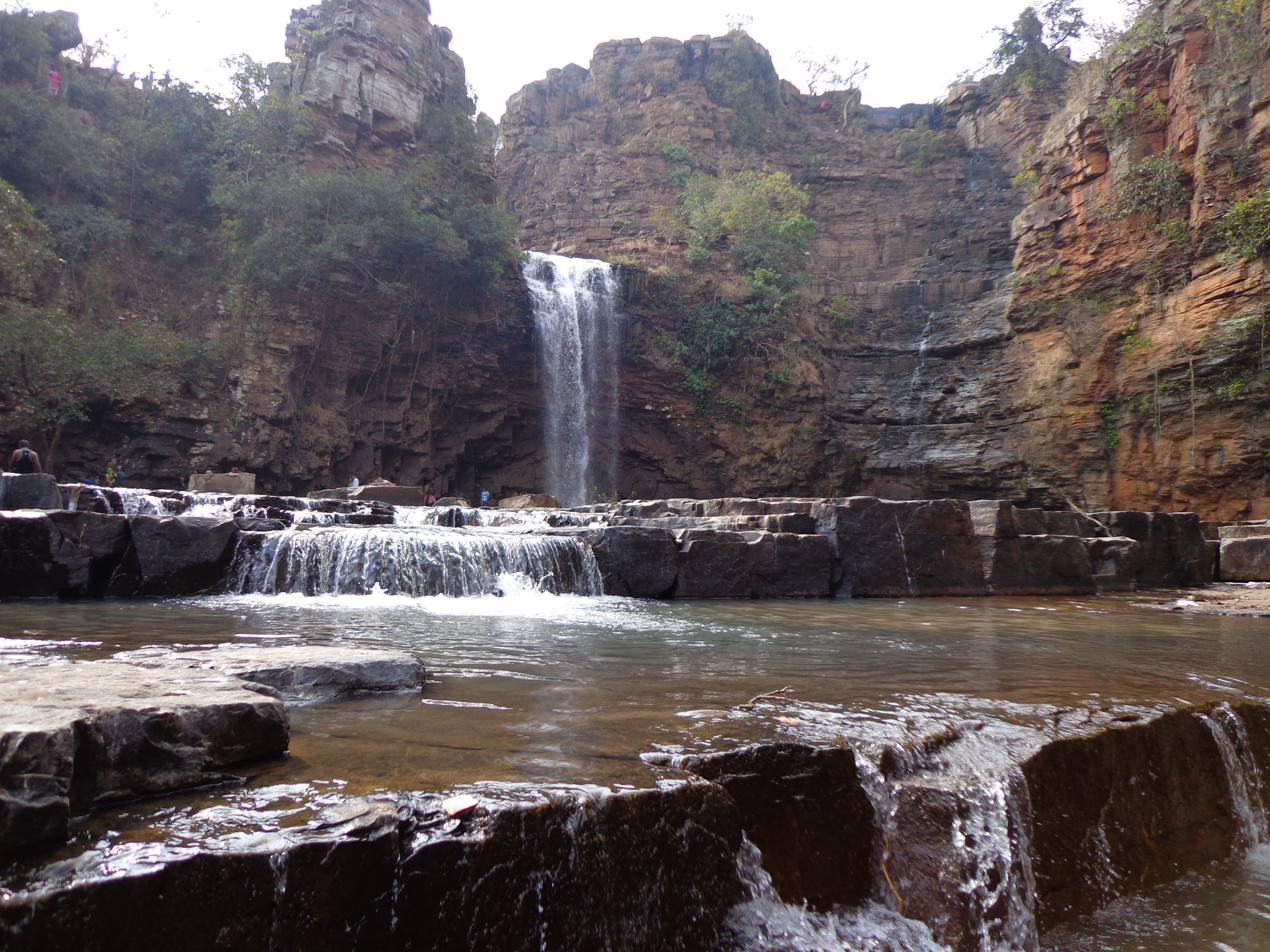
Tirathgarh Falls, Bastar

- Chitrakote Falls
- Teerathgarh Falls
- Chitra Dhara Falls
- Tamda Ghumar
- Mendri Ghumar
- Mandwa Waterfalls
- Jhulna Darha Falls
- Chik-Narra Falls
- Shiv-Ganga Falls
- Bhunbhuni Falls
- Bijakasaa Falls
- Kanger Dhara Falls
- Kunduru Nala Waterfall
- Vijay Ghumar Waterfall
- Topar Waterfall
- Toyer Nala Waterfall
- Lude Ghumar Waterfall
- Dordori Waterfalls
- Maajur Tondri Waterfall
- Udli Bahar Waterfall
- Madhota Waterfalls
- Alwa Dongripara Waterfall
- Burungpal Waterfall

=== Jashpur District ===
- Dangiri Falls
- Ranidah Falls
- Kotebira Falls
- Rajpuri Falls
- Bhringraj Falls
- Gullu Falls
- Churi Falls
- Bane Falls

=== Korba District ===
- Damau Dhara
- Deopahri Waterfall
- Kendai waterfall
- Nakiya waterfall
- bhamarjhajha waterfall
- Teenjhariya waterfall

=== Dhamtari District ===
- Narhara
- Gahandhar Dhara Falls

=== Kanker District ===
- Malaj-kudum Falls
- Charre-Marre Falls
- Madoda Falls
- Badgo Falls
- Kamkakudum Falls

=== Korea District ===
- Amrit-Dhara Waterfall
- Ramdah Waterfall
- Gaurghat Waterfall (Tarra, Sonhat)
- Akuri Nala Waterfall
- Karam ghongha Waterfall

=== Bijapur District ===
- Lankapalli waterfall
- Bogtum Waterfall
- Nambi Dhara
- Satdhara waterfall

=== Surguja District ===
- Tiger point waterfall
- Fish point waterfall
- Ghaghi waterfall
- Perwaghaghi waterfall
- Mahadevmuda waterfall
- Jama-labji waterfall

=== Gariyaband ===
- Godena Falls
- Deo-Dhara
- Chingra-Pagaar
- Jatmai Falls
- Ghata-rani Falls
- Gajpalla Falls
- Kari-pagaar Fall
- Baniya Dhans Fall
- Budhha Raja Falls
- Sindurikhol Fall
- Jharjhara Falls

=== Khairagarh-Chhuikhadan-Gandai District ===
- Thad pani waterfall Saraipatera, Chhuikhadan
- Dhas kuwa Waterfall

=== Sukma District ===
- Dudma Falls (near Chitalnar, Pushpal)
- Pratapgiri Falls (near the border of Sukma and Dantewada districts)
- Bhimsen Falls

== Temples ==
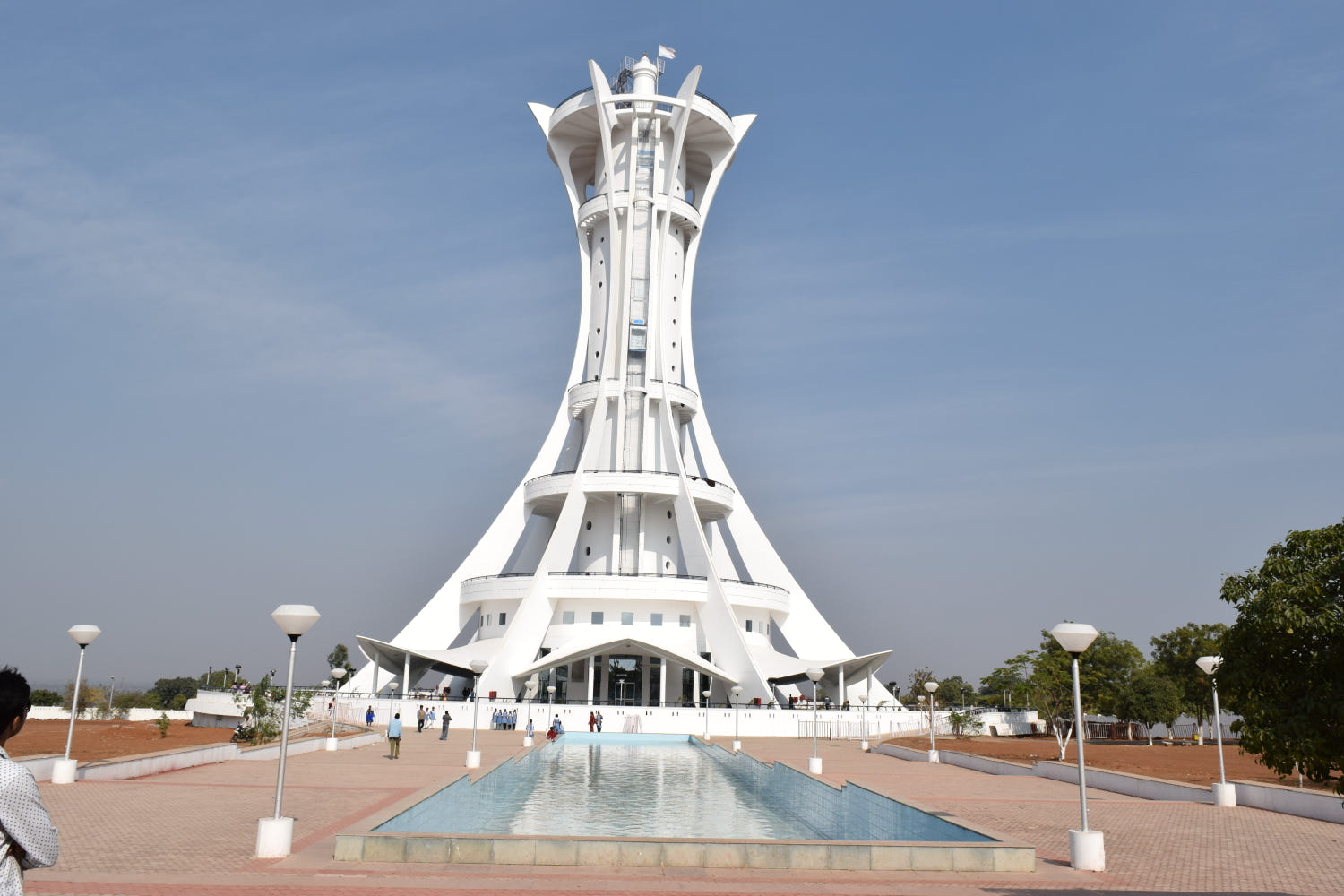
Giraudhpuri Jaitkham

Notable and ancient temples in Chhattisgarh include: Shri Ram Janki Temple at Setganga in Mungeli District, Bhoramdeo temple near Kawardha in Kabirdham district, Rajivlochan temple at Rajim and Champaran in Raipur district, Chandrahasini Devi temple at Chandrapur, Vishnu temple at Janjgir, Damudhara (Rishab Tirth) and Sivarinarayana Laxminarayana temple in Janjgir-Champa district, Bambleshwari Temple at Dongargarh in Rajnandgaon district, Danteshwari Temple in Dantewada district, Deorani-Jethani temple at Tala gram and Mahamaya temple at Ratanpur in Bilaspur district, Laxman temple at Sirpur in Mahasamund district, Uwasaggaharam Parshwa Teerth at Nagpura in Durg district, Pali with Lord Shiva temple and Kharod with Lakshmaneswar temple, Patal Bhairavi temple in outer area of Rajnandgaon.

Giraudhpuri is a religious place for the Satnamis. They are the followers of Satnampanth.

Sirpur, a proposed World Heritage Site. and Malhar are of historical significance, as they were visited by Xuanzang, the Chinese historian. Mama-bachha temple is at Barsoor.

The hot spring known as Taat Pani, (taat - hot, pani - water) flows in Balrampur district. This hot spring flows throughout the year and is reputed to have medicinal properties due to its high sodium content. National Thermal Power Corporation Limited is developing a geothermal power plant at Taat Pani, which is described as the first geothermal power plant in India.

== Ancient temples ==
=== Dantewada District ===
- Mama Bhanja temple, Barsur
- Battisa Temple, Barsur
- Goddess Danteshwari temple, Dantewada
- Samloor Mahadev Temple
- Chandraditya temple, Barsur

=== Bastar District ===
- Gumadpal Mahadev Temple
- Mahadev Temple, Bastar
- Devarli temple, Dodrepal, near Tokapal
- Shiv temple, Chhindgaon, Bastar
- Ruined Shiv temple, Gudhiyari, Kesharpal, Bastar
- Shiv temple, Singhaigudi, Ghumarmundpara, Chitrakote

=== Raipur District ===
- Mahadev temple, Chandkhuri
- Mahadev Temple, Nawagaon
- Mahadev Temple, Girod
- Bhand Dewal temple, Arang

=== Durg District ===
- Mahadev temple, Dev-baloda, near Charoda, Bhilai
- Mahadev Temple, Nagpura, Durg
- Lord Parshva nath Temple, Nagpura, Durg

=== Bilaspur District ===
- Mahamaya Temple, Ratanpur
- Ancient Shiva Temple, Kirari Gordhi
- Deorani – Jethani Temple, Amarikampa
- Shiv temple, Belpan, Takhatpur
- Bhima-Kichak temple, Malhar, Masturi
- Madku Dwip Temples, Bilaspur Raipur Highway, Bilaspur

=== Janjgir-Champa ===
- Goddess Shabari temple, Sheori-Narayan
- Lord Ram temple, Sheori-Narayan
- Laxmaneshwar temple, Sheori-Narayan
- Lord Vishnu temple, Janjgir
- Ruined Shiv temple, Adbhar, Shakti

=== Gariyaband ===
- Rajiv Lochan temple, Rajim
- Lord Ramchandra temple, Rajim
- Lord Balkrishna temple, Rajim
- Goddess Mavli temple, Rajim
- Kuleshwar Mahadev temple, Rajim

=== Mahasamund ===
- Laxman temple, Sirpur
- Surang Tila temple, Sirpur
- Anand Prabhu kuti Vihar (Tiwar dev temple), Sirpur
- Swastik Vihar, Sirpur
- Jagannath temple, Bagbahara

=== Balod ===
- Kukur dev temple, Khapari, Balod
- Jagannathpur Shiv temple
- Kapileshwar Group of temples, Balod
- Ancient temple, Dondilohara
- Shiv temple, Palari, Balod

=== Surguja ===
- Goddess Ambika temple, Ambikapur
- Shiv temple, Devgarh, Udaipur
- Deur temple, Maharanipur, Sitapur
- Devi temple (Chherika Deur), Devtikra, Udaipur
- Group of temples, Satmahla, Kalcha-Bhadwahi, Udaipur

=== Balodabazar ===
- Chitvari devi temple, Dhobani, Simga
- Mavli devi temple, Tarponga, Simga
- Siddheshwar Shiv temple, Palari
- Ancient Ruined temple, Damru

== National parks and wildlife sanctuaries ==
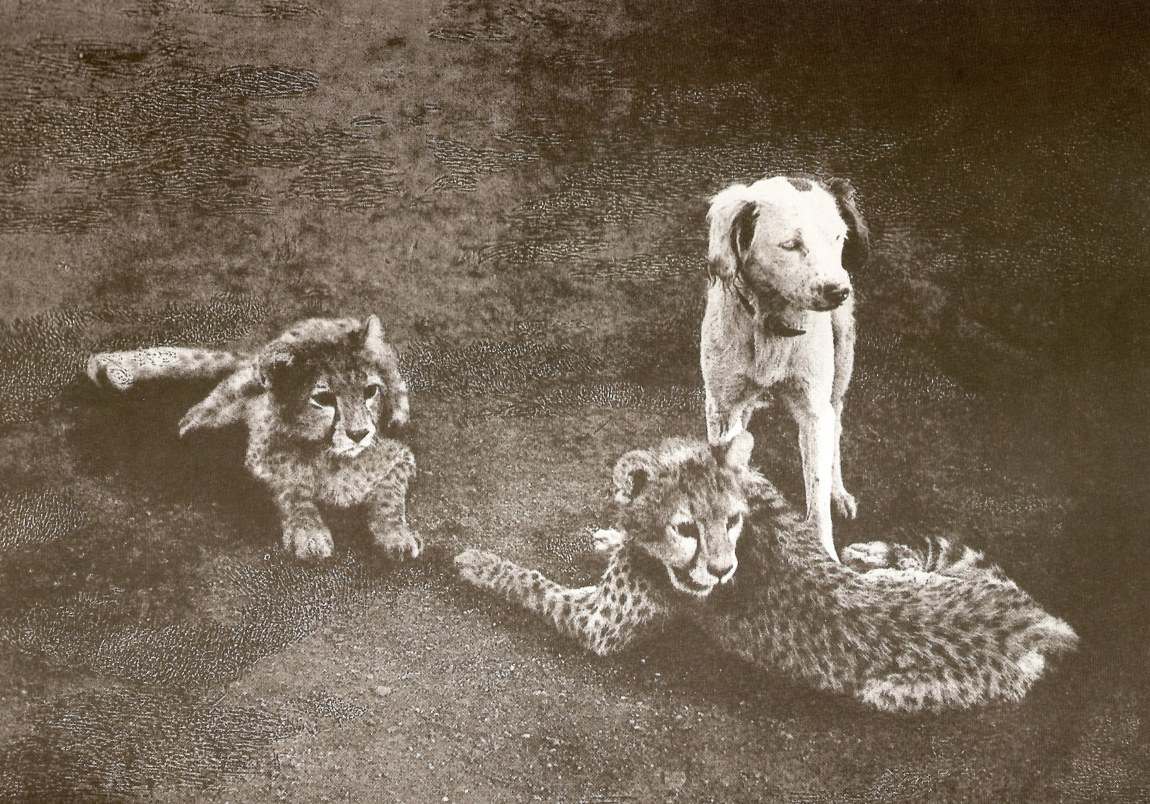
Asiatic cheetah cubs with a dog in British India, 1897.

There are several wildlife sanctuaries and national parks in Chhattisgarh including the Achanakmar Wildlife Sanctuary in the Mungeli district, Gamarda Reserve forest at Sarangarh in the Raigarh district, Indravati National Park and Kanger Ghati National Park in the Bastar district, Barnawapara Wildlife sanctuary in the Mahasamund district. There is also Guru Ghasidas National Park. It is designated as Guru Ghasidas - Tamor Pingla Tiger Reserve. The natural environment of Koriya includes many dense forests, mountains, rivers and waterfalls, and is known for the rich mineral deposits. Coal is found in abundance in this part of the country. The dense forests present here have a rich wildlife, and the district was where the last known Asiatic cheetah was spotted in the wilderness of India. The climate of Koriya has mild summers and cool winters.

=== National Parks ===
- Kanger Ghati National Park, Bastar District (Area: 200 km^{2})
- Indravati National Park, Bijapur District (Area: 1258 km^{2})
- Guru Ghasidas National Park, Korea District (Area: 2898.705 km^{2})

=== Sanctuaries ===
- Achanakmar Wildlife Sanctuary, Bilaspur/Mungeli, 1975
- Badalkhol Wildlife Sanctuary, Jashpur, 1975
- Bhairamgarh Wildlife Sanctuary, Bijapur, 1983
- Barnawapara Wildlife Sanctuary, Balodabazaar, 1976
- Gomarda Wildlife Sanctuary, Raigarh, 1975
- Pamed Wildlife Sanctuary, Bijapur, 1983
- Semarsot Wildlife Sanctuary. Balrampur, 1978
- Sitanadi Wildlife Sanctuary, Dhamtari, 1974
- Udanti Wildlife Sanctuary, Gariyaband, 1972
- Tamor Pingla Wildlife Sanctuary, Surguja, 1978
- Bhoramdev Wildlife Sanctuary, Kawardha, 2001

== Caves and archaeological sites ==
Gadiya mountain in Kanker district, Kotumsar cave in Bastar district, Kailash gufa in Jashpur district, Ramgarh and Sita Bengra in Surguja district and Singhanpur cave in Raigarh district with pre-historic paintings are well known. There are cave paintings at Ongana and Kabra Pahad near Raigarh, though most of the paintings lie in open the and have been overwritten with graffiti. Archaeological sites include Barsoor in Dantewada district, Malhar and Ratanpur in Bilaspur district, Sirpur in Mahasamund district, Koriya in Koriya district and Surguja in Surguja district. There is a small picnic spot with waterfall on the extremity of Satpura range along with a stone inscription of c. 1st century CE is found at Damau dhara in Janjgir-Champa district.

=== Caves in Chhattisgarh ===
==== Bastar District ====
- Aranyak Cave Kanger Ghati National Park
- Dandak Cave Kanger Ghati National Park
- Kailash Caves Kanger Ghati National Park
- Devgiri Cave Kanger Ghati National Park
- Jhumar Cave Kanger Ghati National Park
- Kanak Cave Kanger Ghati National Park
- Kotumsar Cave
- Mendhkamaari Cave Kanger Ghati National Park
- Rani Cave Kanger Ghati National Park
- Gumalwada Cave Kanger Ghati National Park
- Green Chamber Cave(Salma Sitara) Kanger Ghati National Park
- Gorla Ama Cave Kanger Ghati National Park
- Dobla Mahadev Cave Kanger Ghati National Park
- Gudiya Cave Kanger Ghati National Park
- Kulur Gaddha Cave Kanger Ghati National Park
- Mayar Kotla Cave Kanger Ghati National Park
- Durki Koppa Cave (also known as Chhota Devgiri) Kanger Ghati National Park
- Parewa Badi Cave Kanger Ghati National Park

==== Kanker District ====
- Jogi Cave, Gadiya Mountain Kanker
- Sondayee Cave, Kanker

==== Jashpur district ====
- Kailash Cave
- Khudiya Rani Cave

==== Khairagarh-Chhuikhadan-Gandai district ====
- Mandipkhol Cave Chhuikhadan

==== Bijapur ====
- Shakal-Narayan Cave, Bijapur
- Shankanpalli Cave, Bijapur
- Usur Cave, Bijapur

==== Surguja ====
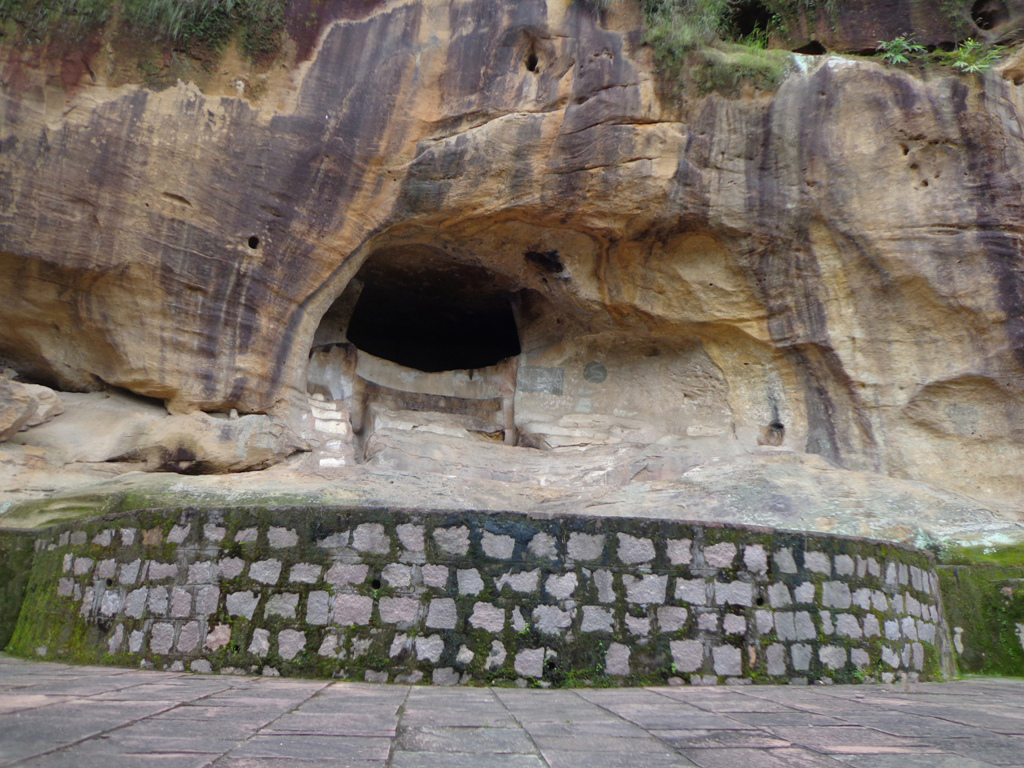
Sita Bengra Cave, Ramgarh Hills, Surguja

- Jogi-mara
- Sita-bengra
- Laxman Bengra
- Haathi-pol

==== Raigarh District ====
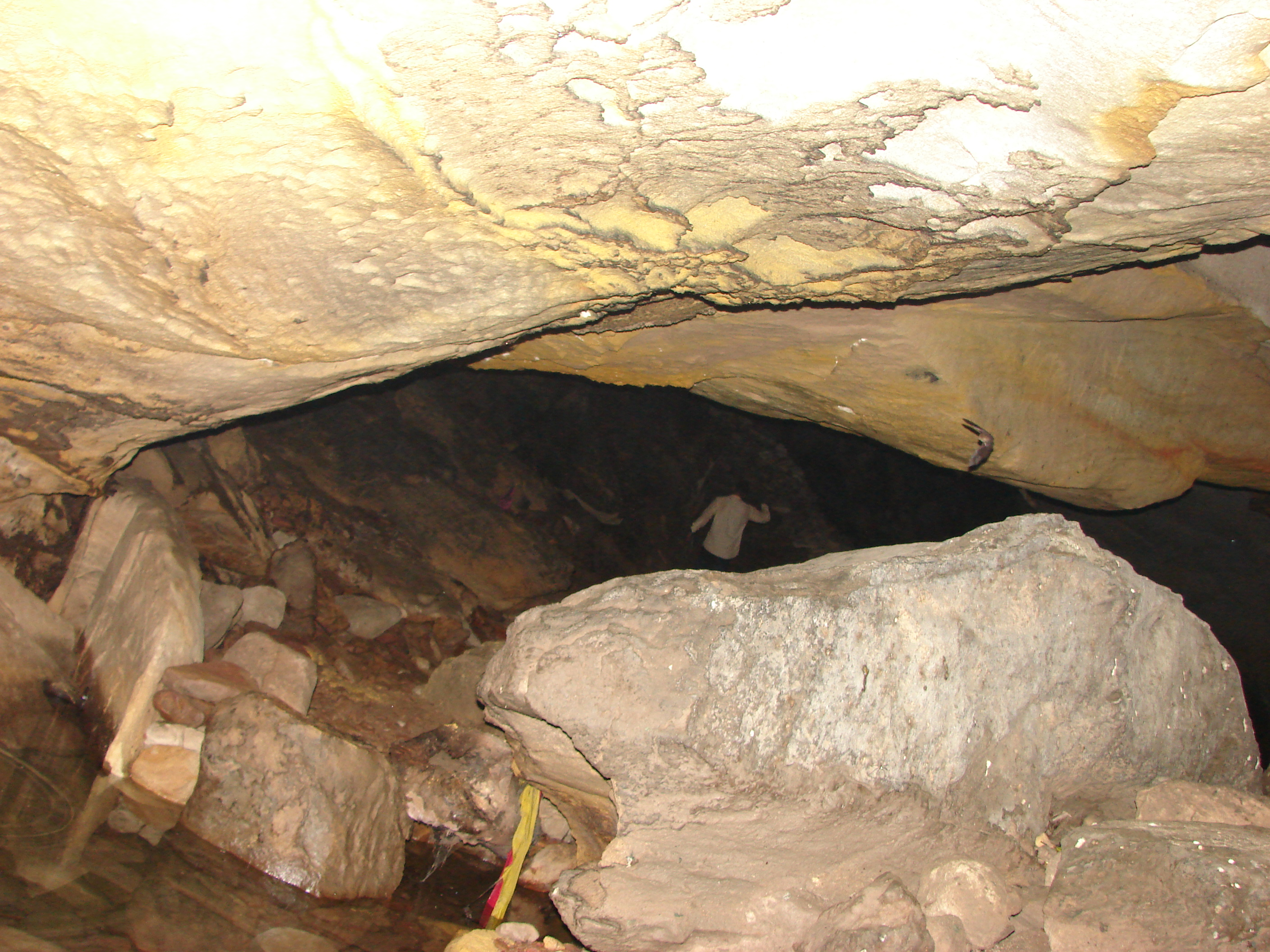
Kurra Cave, Lailunga, Raigarh

- Kurra Cave
- Singhanpur cave
- Botalda cave

== Dams ==
Dams, not only used for Irrigation and Hydro-electricity generation, but also serve the purpose of artificial eco-tourism. Some of the main projects of Chhattisgarh are as follows:

- Gangrel Dam (Dhamtari)
- Madumsilli/Murumsilli Reservoir (Dhamtari)
- Rudri Pick-up Weir (Dhamtari)
- Dudhawa Dam (Kanker)
- Kherkatta Dam (Kanker)
- Sondhur Dam (Dhamtari)
- Sikasaar Dam (Gaariyaband)
- Minimata (Hasdeo-Bango) Dam Project (Korba)
- Kelo Dam (Raigarh)
- Kodar (Veer Narayan Singh) Dam (Mahasamund)
- Bhainsajhar Dam (Bilaspur)
- Khuntaghat Reservoir (Bilaspur)
- Tandula Dam/reservoir (Balod)
- Chhindari Dam/reservoir (Chhuikhadan)

== See also ==
- Central India
- Rihand River
- Son River
