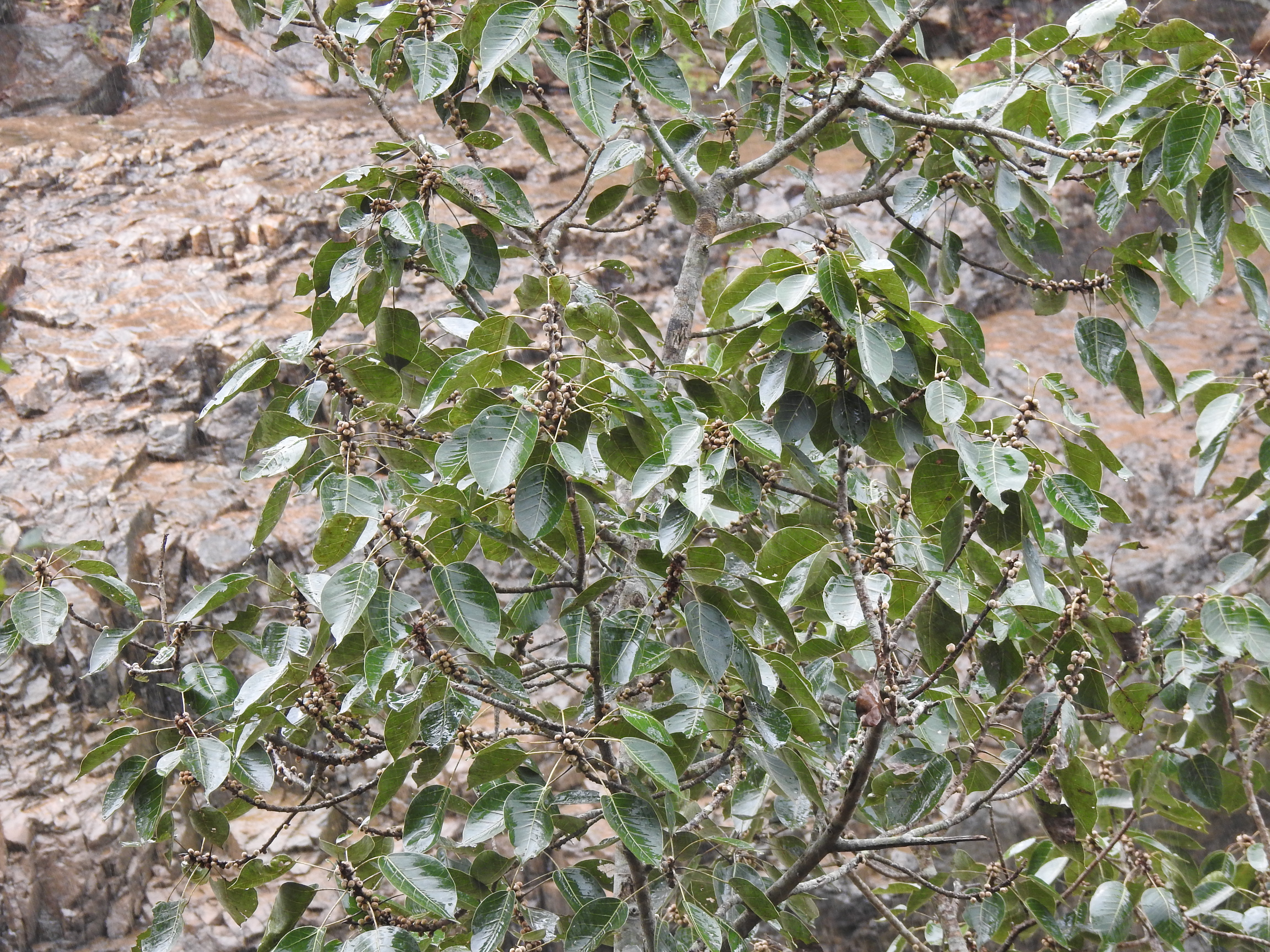

Scientific classification
- Kingdom: Plantae
- Clade: Embryophytes
- Clade: Tracheophytes
- Clade: Angiosperms
- Clade: Eudicots
- Clade: Rosids
- Order: Rosales
- Family: Moraceae
- Genus: Ficus
- Species: F. naikii

Binomial name
- Ficus naikii A.P. Tiwari, Shreehari & R.P. Mishra

= Ficus naikii =

Species of fig

Ficus naikii, the Kanger Valley fig, is a critically endangered species in the family Moraceae, discovered and described in 2025 from Kanger Valley National Park (KVNP) in the Bastar district of Chhattisgarh. It is endemic to the Bastar division of Chhattisgarh state in central India. The species epithet (naikii) is in the honor of Dr. M. L. Naik, Ex-Professor and Dean, School of Studies in Life Science, Pandit Ravishankar Shukla University, Raipur, Chhattisgarh, an eminent taxonomist, ecologist, environmentalist and administrator, who have devoted more than 45 years to the floristic studies in Chhattisgarh.

== Description ==
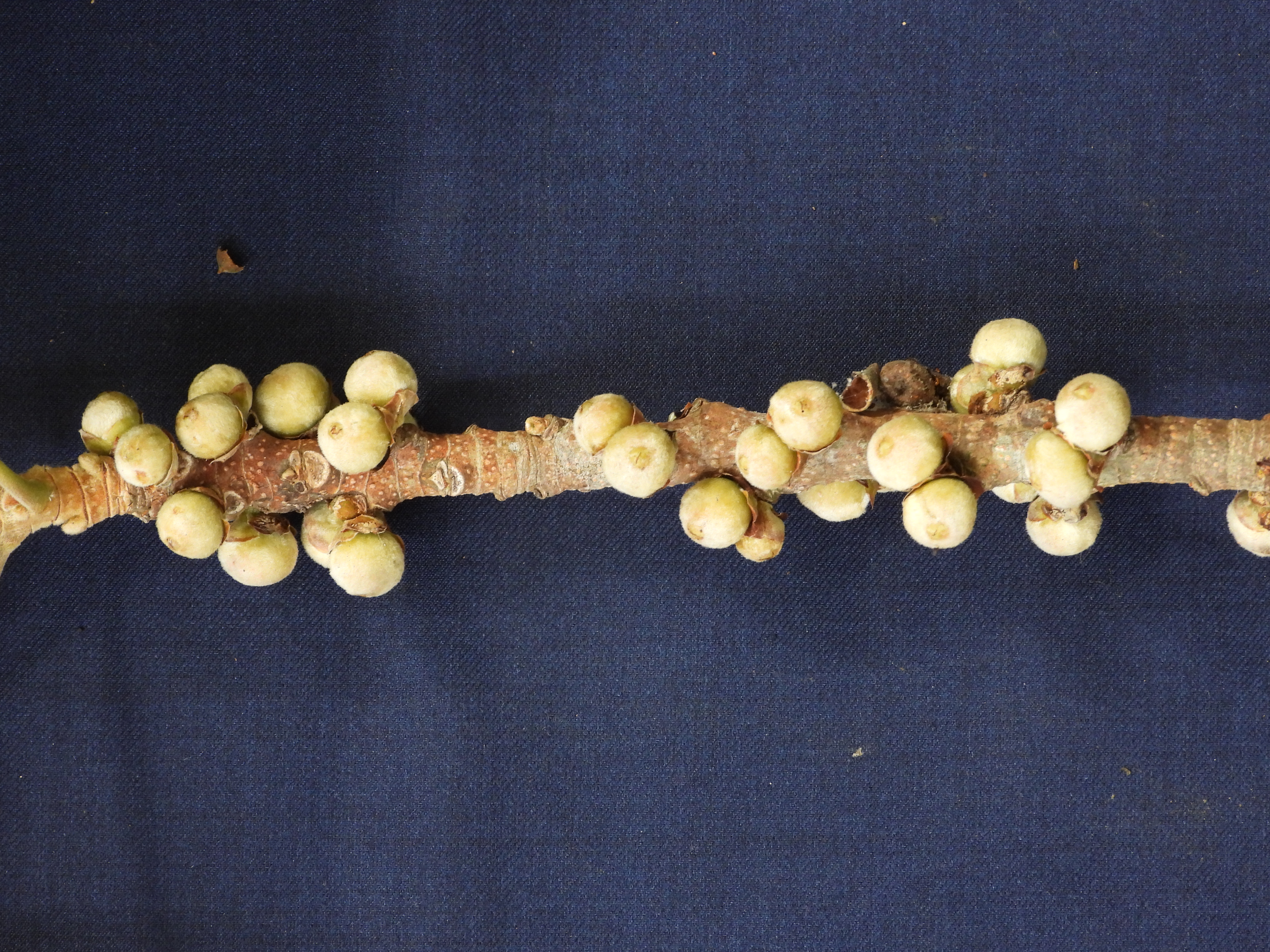
Tomentose figs (Ficus naikii), type photograph from Kanger Valley National Park, Bastar, CG, IN

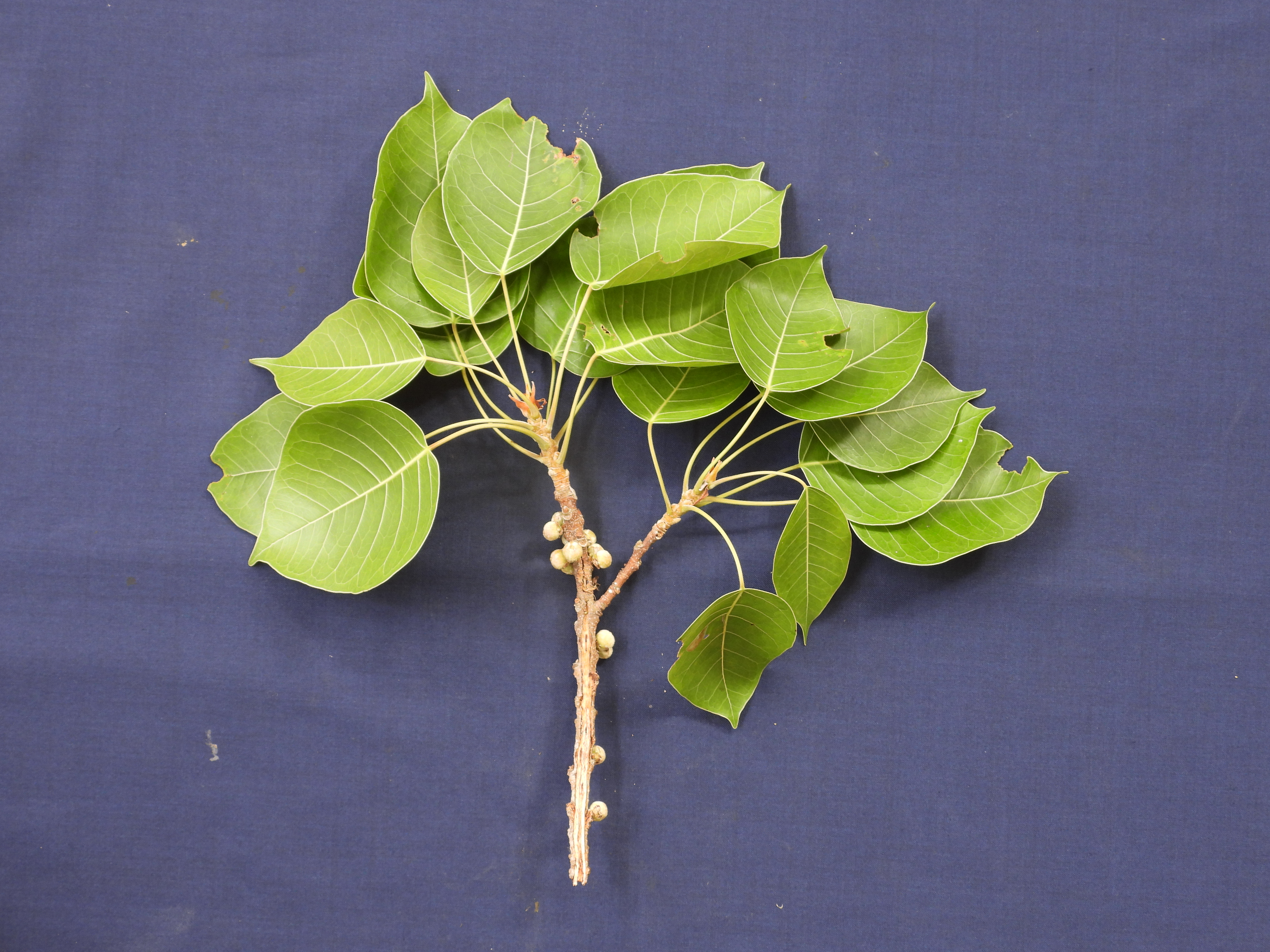
A fruiting twig (Ficus naikii), type photograph from Kanger Valley National Park, Bastar, CG, IN

A small tree grows up to 6 m (20 ft) in height. Bark is smooth, glabrous, white to pale yellow in color. Leaves simple; stipule 0.6–3.5 cm (0.24–1.38 in) long, pubescent; petiole 4.5–8.0 cm (1.8–3.1 in) long, glabrous; lamina ovate in shape, 7.0 cm–16.0 cm × 4.5 cm–11.0 cm (2.8 in–6.3 in × 1.8 in–4.3 in), base subcordate to rounded, apex acuminate, acumen up to 1.5 cm (0.59 in) long, glabrous on both side; lateral veins 6-7 pairs. Basal bracts covering up to middle of the receptacle, 4.6 mm (0.18 in) long, pubescent-tomentose outside and glabrous inside. Receptacles axillary, paired or clustered sessile, globose, 0.6–0.8 cm (0.24–0.31 in) in diameter, tomemtose. Staminate flowers sessile; tepals 3-4, free, white. Pistillate flowers sessile; tepal 3-4, lanceolate, free, white; ovary pale brown. Figs tomentose.

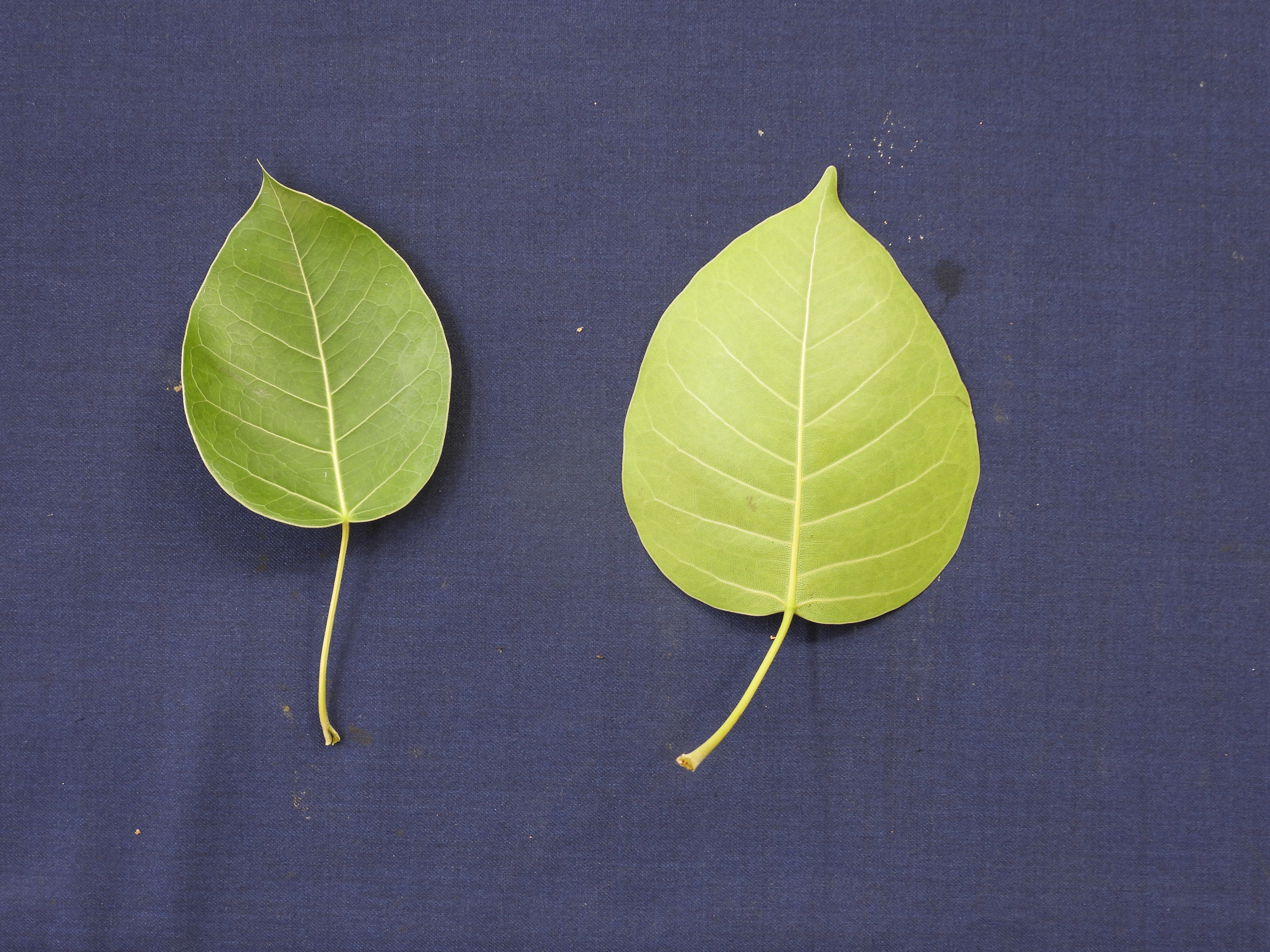
Leaves: upper and lower surface (Ficus naikii), clicked from type individual at Kanger Valley National Park, Bastar, CG, IN

== Distribution and habitat ==
The native range of this species is India (Bastar, Chattisgarh). It grows primarily in the seasonally dry tropical biome.
