= Silsiilay =

2005 Indian film by Khalid Mohamed

- Film Poster
- Directed by: Khalid Mohamed
- Written by: Khalid Mohammed
- Dialogues by: Shiraz Siddique
- Produced by: Vashu Bhagnani
- Starring: Tabu; Bhumika Chawla; Riya Sen; Celina Jaitly; Anita Hassanandani; Divya Dutta; Rahul Bose; Jimmy Sheirgill; Ashmit Patel; Kay Kay Menon
- Narrated by: Shah Rukh Khan
- Cinematography: Santosh Sivan
- Edited by: Steven H. Bernard
- Music by: Songs: Himesh Reshammiya; Background Score: Monty Sharma
- Production company: Pooja Entertainment
- Distributed by: Zee Motion Pictures (India); Eros International (Overseas)
- Release date: 17 June 2005
- Running time: 132 minutes
- Country: India
- Language: Hindi
- Budget: ₹2 crore
- Box office: ₹1.78 crore

Silsiilay (English: Stories) is a 2005 Indian Hindi-language romance film written and directed by Khalid Mohammed. The film stars an ensemble cast featuring Tabu, Bhumika Chawla, Riya Sen, Celina Jaitly, Anita Hassanandani, Divya Dutta, Rahul Bose, Jimmy Sheirgill, Ashmit Patel and Kay Kay Menon, with Shah Rukh Khan in a special appearance as the narrator. The film is an anthology that explores the lives of three women from different age groups and backgrounds, each of whom loses the man she loves to another woman, ultimately finding her own identity. It was released on 17 June 2005 and was a commercial disaster.

== Plot ==
The film intertwines the stories of three women from different stages of life.

Ziya, a fast-rising Bollywood actress, is in a live-in relationship with Neel, the man who groomed her for a film career. She wants a child with him, but he is unwilling to take on any responsibility and soon moves on to another girlfriend.

Anushka is a telephone receptionist who longs to discover tenderness in her relationship with a wealthy suitor, Nikhil, who only has sex on his mind. Meanwhile, her office colleague, Tarun, loves her silently. She must decide between the two in a romantic finale that has a twist.

Rehana is a housewife who must confront the fact that her husband, Anwar , is being unfaithful to her with an air hostess named Preeti. Her story becomes one of the first in Hindi cinema to explicitly discuss a Muslim woman's right to divorce and initiate the dissolution of her marriage.

The three stories are woven into a composite picture, with the women coming together in an act of solidarity in the climax.

== Cast ==
Story 1

- Bhumika Chawla as Ziya Rao Katyal
- Rahul Bose as Neel Kashyap
- Divya Dutta as Diya Katyal
- Priya Badlani as Nandita
- Aamir Ali as a Bollywood actor
- Tabu as Rehana Ahmed Bhoy, Ziya's fan

Story 2

- Riya Sen as Anushka Verma
- Jimmy Sheirgill as Tarun Ahuja
- Ashmit Patel as Nikhil Rai
- Anita Hassanandani as Piya Mahajan

Story 3

- Tabu as Rehana Ahmed Bhoy
- Kay Kay Menon as Anwar Ahmed Bhoy
- Celina Jaitly as Preeti
- Karan Panthaky as Inayat Ahmed Bhoy (Anwar's son from his first wife)
- Priya Badlani as Nandita (Preeti's friend)

Other cast

- Shah Rukh Khan as the Sutradhaar (Narrator)
- Dolly Bindra as Ziya's fan / Woman at the beach / Sheetal
- Rakesh Bedi as Harry (Nandita's uncle) / Anushka's boss

== Production ==
Silsiilay was directed by film critic-turned-filmmaker Khalid Mohamed, his third feature after Fiza (2000) and Tehzeeb (2003). The film was produced by Vashu Bhagnani under the banner of Pooja Entertainment.

Mohamed based the story on Jean Cocteau's play Human Voices, in which a woman calls up her lover on the telephone to berate him to go to hell, while still trying to retain him. Mohamed wanted to explore the "complicated relationships between man-woman, why someone said yes when she wanted to say no." Producer Bhagnani admitted that the film went over-budget, stating, He [Khalid] always wanted a small budget film, which I couldn't give him because I'm not used to smaller canvas." The film was shot in Mandwa and Dubai to add a visual appeal to songs. Cinematography was handled by Santosh Sivan, and the music was composed by Himesh Reshammiya.

The film interconnects the stories of three women in the age of 20, 30 and 40 played by Riya Sen, Bhumika Chawla and Tabu. Mohamed noted that actor Tabu, with whom he had wanted to work since Fiza, was offered two roles and chose to play the Muslim housewife. He described her as being "like my surrogate daughter".

== Themes ==
The film explores the lives of three women as they part from the man they love to another woman and discover who they are alone, "no-love-lost but self-gained". The male characters, a petty adulterer, a playboy, a faithful but ignored co-worker, and a dishonourable husband, who are their catalysts for self-realisation, are not the main characters in the film.

A major theme in the film is the Muslim woman's right to divorce, The Hindu noted that Silsiilay was "probably for the first time in Hindi cinema" to address this subject,a woman who rids herself of her marriage before the man can send her packing with those three dreaded words of triple talaq. The critic continued, "the Muslim characters in this film are those 'thinking, reasoning souls' rather than the 'paan-chewing buffoons or gun-toting stereotypes' one usually gets to see in Bollywood.".

== Music ==
Silsiilay

Soundtrack album by Himesh Reshammiya
- Released: 2005
- Venue: Mumbai
- Genre: Feature film soundtrack
- Language: Hindi
- Label: Venus Records & Tapes
- Producer: Himesh Reshammiya

Himesh Reshammiya chronology
Yakeen (2005)	Silsiilay (2005)	Maine Pyar Kyun Kiya? (2005)

The soundtrack was composed by Himesh Reshammiya with lyrics by Sameer. The soundtrack received a mixed response. The Times of India noted that while the music was "not bad," "too many songs after a point of time become a bit frustrating." Shahid Khan of Planet Bollywood rated the album 6.5/10, writing that "Silsiilay is the opposite of many other recent soundtracks where music directors feel that their songs must assault your ears in order for it to have chartbusting potential. The numbers are soft and sweet and are just the perfect thing to listen to on a lazy summer afternoon."

Track listing
No.	Title	Singer(s)	Length
1.	"Ban Jaiye"	Kunal Ganjawala, Alka Yagnik
2.	"Ahista Ahista"	Sonu Nigam, Shreya Ghoshal, Jayesh Gandhi
3.	"Meri Chandi Tu (Dum Mast Kalander)"	Kailash Kher, Sunidhi Chauhan, Suzanne D'Mello
4.	"Meri Jaan"	Kunal Ganjawala, Sadhana Sargam
5.	"Jab Jab Dil Mile"	Sonu Nigam, Jayesh Gandhi
6.	"Tere Liye Mere"	Jolly Mukherjee, Alisha Chinai, Jayesh Gandhi
7.	"Belibaas Karde"	Sunidhi Chauhan, Jayesh Gandhi

== Release and reception ==
=== Critical reception ===
Silsiilay received mostly negative reviews from critics. Taran Adarsh of Bollywood Hungama rated the film 1.5 out of 5 stars and wrote "Silsilay is more of an experiment that caters to a very small segment of moviegoers. At the box-office, the film holds no appeal for an ordinary cinegoer." Sukanya Verma of Rediff.com reviewed the film and wrote "Among the three stories, the first is clever, the second is predictable and the third is emotional. The climax is dealt in a disappointing manner." She mentioned that the film could have ended earlier instead of stretching unnecessarily for seven or eight minutes.

Mandira Mitra of The Telegraph rated the film 5.5 out of 10 stars and wrote that the idea of women finding self-identity after losing love was "familiar" and "nothing remarkable or original." She mentioned that the film had "less discrepancy between intent and content" than typical women-centric films while depicting its characters "more candidly and realistically." She also praised the male characters as "dead-on, real-life characters" and noted that Shah Rukh Khan's narration was a "nice ploy" that charmed the audience. The Times of India rated the film 1.5 out of 5 stars and wrote that it "will reinforce the bitter-truth that a mere presence of SRK in a movie is not going to change its fate at the Box-office." The review praised Tabu as "the best thing in this film" but concluded that "you won't miss anything in your life if you decide to keep yourself away from this flick."

Ziya Us Salam of The Hindu reviewed the film and wrote that it "shows flashes of brilliance" in its handling of a Muslim woman's right to divorce, while ultimately noting that it "promised so much but fulfilled much less." He praised Tabu for infusing her character with "rare dignity" but criticised the director for equivocating and indulging in euphemism rather than fully committing to his bold subject.

=== Box office ===
The film was a commercial disaster. According to Box Office India, it opened to a poor 20 to 30% occupancy at theatres and earned a total nett gross of approximately ₹1.15 crore and a worldwide gross of ₹1.78 crore. Following the film's failure, director Khalid Mohamed expressed frustration with the film's promotion and announced his decision to quit filmmaking, stating, "I am not blaming anyone, but the strategy, promos and posters of the film were very ill-conceived... My producer was on a different wavelength altogether."

== Legacy ==
On the 20th anniversary of the film in 2025, actress Celina Jaitly called it "a truly ahead of its time a beautiful anthology of three very emotional stories. One each of love and longing at every age of life. I was lucky to work with the two most incredible actors, the marvelous Tabu and the talented Kay Menon. Sharing screen space with such phenomenal seniors was such a wonderful learning experience for me. The song Be-libaas became iconic and one of my most favorite solos to date."
