= Naach =

2004 Indian film by Ram Gopal Varma

- Poster
- Directed by: Ram Gopal Varma
- Written by: Pooja Ladha Surti; Sulekha Bajpai; Musharaff Ali Khan
- Produced by: Ram Gopal Varma; Chitra Subramaniam
- Starring: Abhishek Bachchan; Antara Mali; Ritesh Deshmukh
- Cinematography: Kiran Reddy
- Edited by: Amit Parmar; Nipun Gupta
- Music by: Songs; Amar Mohile; Shailendra-Swapnil; Nitin Raikwar; Background Score; Amar Mohile
- Production company: RGV Film Company
- Distributed by: T-Series
- Release date: 12 November 2004
- Running time: 150 minutes
- Language: Hindi

Naach (Dance) is a 2004 Indian Hindi-language dance film directed by Ram Gopal Varma, starring Abhishek Bachchan, Antara Mali and Riteish Deshmukh.

== Plot ==
Abhinav (Abhishek Bachchan) and Reva (Antara Mali) are two middle-class citizens in the big city of Mumbai. Both are trying to get a breakthrough in their professions. Abhinav wants to be an actor, and Reva wants to be a choreographer. Both meet, fall in love, and spend some intimate moments together.

Abhinav tries to help Reva out. Things get better when he gets his first film offer; however, Reva refuses his help and wants to make it on her own. Abhinav becomes a huge star. She eventually gets her first offer to choreograph, but the director only wants to approach Abhinav through her. Eventually, both of them drift apart and break up.

Reva finally gets a genuine offer to choreograph by Diwakar (Riteish Deshmukh), who likes her style and work. Reva by now has become a huge star, and soon she is given the offer to work with Abhinav.

The rest of the film focuses on whether Abhinav and Reva can put their differences aside and if they get back together.

== Cast ==
- Abhishek Bachchan as Abhinav Kalantri
- Antara Mali as Reva
- Ritesh Deshmukh as Diwakar Pandit
- Rajesh Tandon as Sandesh
- Priya Badlani as Priya
- Manoj Pahwa as Director
- Rajesh Khera as Rajesh Malhotra

== Soundtrack ==
Naach

Soundtrack album by Amar Mohile, Shailendra-Swapnil & Nitin Raikwar
- Released: 15 October 2004
- Genre: Feature film soundtrack
- Length: 38:42
- Language: Hindi
- Label: T-Series

The soundtrack of Naach consists of 8 songs composed by Amar Mohile, Shailendra-Swapnil, and Nitin Raikwar; the lyrics of which were written by Nitin Raikwar, Taabish Romani, Jaideep Sahni, and Makrand Deshpande.

Tracklist
No.	Title	Lyrics	Music	Singer(s)	Length
1.	"Berang Zindagi"	Nitin Raikwar	Nitin Raikwar	Sukhwinder Singh & Gayatri Iyer	04:43
2.	"Naach Naach Ke"	Taabish Romani	Shailendra-Swapnil	Shweta Pandit	04:49
3.	"Ishq Da Tadka"	Nitin Raikwar	Nitin Raikwar	Adnan Sami & Sonu Kakkar	05:04
4.	"Sara Sara"	Taabish Romani	Amar Mohile	Kunal Ganjawala, Hema Sardesai & Gayatri Iyer	03:02
5.	"Rakth Ka Hai" (Reprise)	Makrand Deshpande	Shailendra-Swapnil	Makrand Deshpande	06:13
6.	"Bandhane Lagi"	Jaideep Sahni	Amar Mohile	Shweta Pandit & Sumit Kumar	06:11
7.	"Awara Man Mein"	Nitin Raikwar	Amar Mohile	Shweta Pandit	03:05
8.	"Rakth Ka Hai"	Nitin Raikwar	Shailendra-Swapnil	Kunal Ganjawala & Shweta Pandit	05:35
Total length:					38:42

== Critical reception ==
Rujuta Paradkar of Rediff found the story and music of the film to be weak and the structure of the film to be inspired by Rangeela. The critic gave the film a rating of 3.5 out of 5. Taran Adarsh of Bollywood Hungama praised the acting performances of Antara Mali and Abhishek Bachchan and gave the film a rating of 1.5 out of 5 saying that, "NAACH lacks in that vital department that’s the lifeline of every film – script."

In 2010, Raja Sen of Rediff.com added the film to his list of "75 Landmark Films of the Decade," writing, "Ram Gopal Varma's take on Ayn Rand's Fountainhead features a struggling choreographer and a wannabe actor find and lose themselves through impressively improvised naturalism. Great performances, bonafide heart and RGV's quirkiest frames."
