= Jabb Love Hua =

- Logo from April 2006 to July 2006.
- Created by: Zee TV Creative Team
- Screenplay by: Radhika Borkar, Anand SivaKumaram & Jay Verma; Dialogues; Preiti Mamgain & Sagar Gupta
- Story by: Manta Patnaik
- Directed by: Tony Singh, Imtiaz Punjabi, Deeya Singh and Romesh Kalra
- Creative director: Saurabh Tewari (Zee TV)
- Starring: see below
- Theme music composer: Raju Singh
- Opening theme: "Jabb Love Hua" sung by Himani Kapoor and Raju Singh
- Country of origin: India
- Original language: Hindi
- No. of seasons: 1
- No. of episodes: 256

Production
- Executive producer: Anu Samsay (Zee TV)
- Producers: Deeya & Tony G. Singh
- Cinematography: Neeraj Baliyan
- Editor: Rocchak Ahuja
- Running time: approx. 22 minutes
- Production company: DJ's a Creative Unit

Original release
- Network: Zee TV
- Release: 24 April 2006 – 12 July 2007

Jabb Love Hua (International Title: Love Happens) is a Hindi serial that aired on Zee TV from 24 April 2006 to 12 July 2007. It starred Sudeep Sahir and Priya Badlani in the main roles.

== Plot ==
OBS starts with Aanya Shroff (Priya Badlani), a girl born with silver spoon in her mouth, accidentally making an undesirable wish and her whole family gets in trouble and run from the town and they end into a village where Raghu (Sudeep Sahir), a villager boy lived. When Aanya encounters Raghu, both are disappointed by each other's behaviour and end up fighting. But gradually both start falling for the other and their fights become the string that attach each other. Bhola (Rahul Lohani), Raghu's best friend fall in love with Isha, Aanya's sister who is jealous of Aanya. The series depict their love story as a city girl falls for a villager and she accepts the village lifestyle.

It was produced by DJ's A Creative Unit producers Deeya and Tony Singh, who shot to fame with their show 'Banegi Apni Baat' on Zee TV and Jassi Jaisi Koi Nahi on Sony TV.

== Cast ==
- Sudeep Sahir as Raghu
- Priya Badlani as Aanya Shroff
- Manish Raisinghan as Arjun
- Suhasini Mulay as Geetanjali Devi (GD) Shroff
- Pratima Kazmi as Sumitra Devi
- Rameshwari as Jaanki Devi
- Karan Shah as Kishan Shroff
- Meher Acharya as Debbie Shroff
- Madhur Somanghamani / Monaz Mevawala as Isha Shroff
- Sunita Rajwar as Dacoit Leader
- Vivek Vaswani as Percy
- Abhileen Pandey as Chotu
- Vijay Kashyap as Sarpanch
- Yamini Singh as Yashoda
- Aamir Dalvi as Lakhan
- Shalini Khanna as Gehna
- Rahul Lohani as Bhola
- Atul Shrivastav as Rangeela
- Amardeep Jha as Kaushalya
- Himanshi Chaudhary as Basanti
- Poonam Gulati as Kangana
- Abir Goswami as Inspector Bali Shukla
- Mohit Malik as Rahul Mittal
- Neelu Kohli as Cameo Appearance
