= Mandwa =

Mandwa may refer to the following places in India:

- Mandva, or Mandwa, a village and former princely state in Gujarat
- Mandwa, Maharashtra, in Raigad district
- Mandwa, Nepanagar, in Burhanpur district in Madhya Pradesh
- Mandwa, Parbhani, in Parbhani district of Maharashtra
- Mandwa, site of the Mandwa Waterfalls in Bastar district in Chhattisgarh
