= Priya Badlani =

Indian actress and model

- Born: 27 January 1975 (age 50); Mumbai, India
- Occupation: Actress
- Years active: 2004-present
- Notable work: Aanya in Jabb Love Hua.

Priya Badlani (Hindi: प्रिया बद्लानि; born 27 January 1975) is an Indian actress and a former model. She appears in Bollywood films. She is best known as Aanya Shroff on Zee TV's Serial Jabb Love Hua. She made her first appearance in a Coca-Cola commercial alongside Aamir Khan. She had cameos in movies like Naach and Silsilay before making her big break in Zee TV's Jabb Love Hua.

== Personal life ==
Badlani was born on 27 January 1975 in Mumbai, India. She follows is a Hindu. She had chosen fashion photographer as profession since she had studied Graphics Designing in college.

== Career ==
She made her first appearance in a Coca-Cola commercial alongside Aamir Khan. She had also worked for several brands such as Fair and Lovely, Vatika, Hansel. In 2004, she had a Cameo appearance in movie Naach. In 2005, she again had a cameo role in Silsiilay, which she followed with modeling. She also appeared in The Fashion Magazine where she ranked at the 24th position in the list of Most attractive women in India. In 2007, she appeared in Zee TV's serial Jabb Love Hua.
