= Mandwa Waterfalls =

- मंडवा जलप्रपात
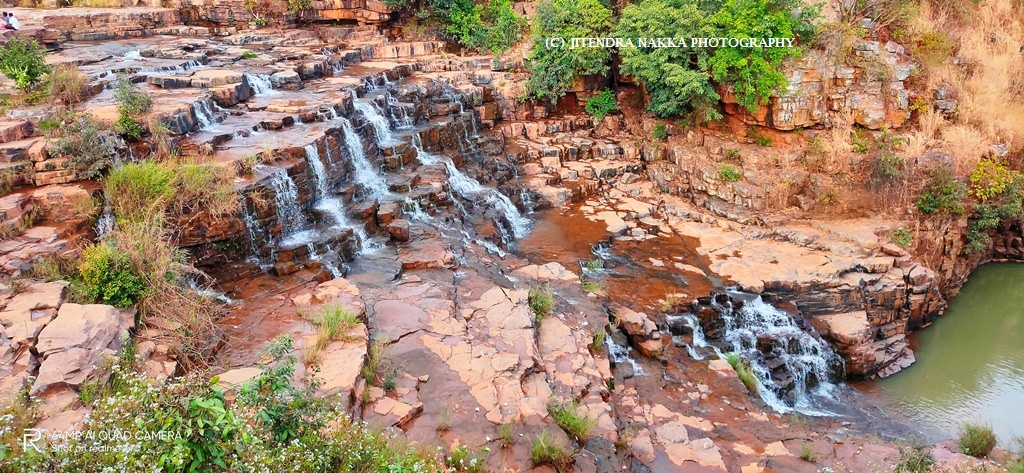
- A cascade segment of Mandwa Waterfalls.

- Location within Chhattisgarh
- Location: Jagdalpur, India
- Coordinates: 18°59′27″N 81°47′36″E
- Type: Cascade
- Total height: 70 feet (21 m)

The Mandwa Waterfalls (Hindi: मंडवा जलप्रपात) is a natural waterfall located in a place called Mandwa off the NH 16 (Jagdalpur-Geedam Road), around 31 kilometres (19 mi) away from Jagdalpur, in Bastar district in the Indian state of Chhattisgarh. It is very close to Teerathgarh Falls and Kanger Dhara Falls.

== Topography ==
Mandwa Waterfalls is located at around 31 km away from Jagdalpur. It is very close to Teerathgarh and Kanger Dhara Waterfalls, located in Bastar district itself. At Mandwa the stream of water flows stepwise and falls from a height of 70 .

The water from this waterfall collects there in a small reservoir and flows downstream meeting Kanger river forming two other waterfalls i.e. Teerathgarh and Kanger Dhara.

== See also ==
- Kanger Ghati National Park
