= Damau dhara =

Damau Dhara (Chhattisgarhi: दमऊ दहरा) is a religious place and popular picnic spot in district SAKTI of Chhattisgarh near Gunji village. Gunji is attached to Barpali village and is together called Gunji (Barpali). In the north, on the other side of the hill is the village Rainkhol. Damau Dhara is located on a road between Sakti and Korba. It is approximately 14 miles from the nearest city of Sakti which is on the Kolkata-Nagpur National Highway 200.

== Background ==
Damau Dhara is locally called Damau Dahra meaning 'Ravine of Damau' because a deep gorge has been made by a waterfall from a small river Gupt Godavari that runs from Satpura Range. Damau Dhara is located at the southern extreme of Satpura Range. There is a small temple at the hill-top from where a long view is possible and one can see far off to Sakti and other places. A big mela is organized every year in the month of January (Magha in Hindi). Sadhus from many places assemble at Damau Dhara on every Solar Eclipse and take bath at the kund after the eclipse is over. However, it is the wild monkeys that take the lead to plunge into the canyon the moment solar eclipse is over.

Legend of the Inscription

There is an inscription on one of the walls near the waterfall which has an ancient writing in many languages. It is said in the folklore that it has some message written in all the possible languages of the world at that time. Archeological study has dated this inscription to 1st century C.E. and the language is Pali. As per the report of Archeological Survey of Western India, Volume IV, page 146:

"...It consists of two parts, the first of which begins with salutation to Bhagavat, and is dated on the I5th day of the 4th fortnight of Hemanta in the 5th regnal year of a king named Sri Kumara Vasanta, and contains the words Bhagavato Usubha-tithi, the name of a thera Godachha and the name Vaslthiputa. Can this last be the same Vasithiputa mentioned in the Ajanta Cave inscription 1? This would take back our record to the first half of the second Century B, C., but it is ascribed to the first Century A. D. by Mr. D. R. Bhandarkar. The second part of the inscription is dated on the second day of the 6th fortnight of Grishma in the 8th year of Kumara Vasanta's reign. Damau Dahra is just a little solitary place like Rupanath, which has an Agoka record, and a likely place which a few Buddhist monks may have selected for their residence."

Another attempt of study on these inscription has been done by L P Pandey in his 1966 published book Maha Kosala Kaumudi.

In local folklore, it is also believed that anyone who can decipher the writing of all the languages inscribed there will get wealth (gold and silver kept in big bronze utensils (गंगार) having the wealth which would suffice two and half days financial transactions of the whole world) which has been submerged in Damau Dehra. The king of Sakti, Raja Bahadur Leeladhar Singh father of Raja Surender Bahadur Singh once brought Pandits from Kashi and tried that the writings be deciphered. However, the Pandits could not succeed and the king in anger fired gunshot on the writing which damaged some of the writing area. However, now government has put a tin shed above the writing of the rocks to preserve the writings.

== Story of Damau Dhara Wealth ==
This is a story of Mama-Bhanja (maternal uncle with his nephew) where the Bhanja is blessed in a manner that a small field gifted by Mama to Bhanja gets very fertile and brings forth gold harvest.
