= Danteshwari Temple =

Hindu temple in Dantewada, Chhattisgarh

Coordinates: 18.8966°N 81.3450°E

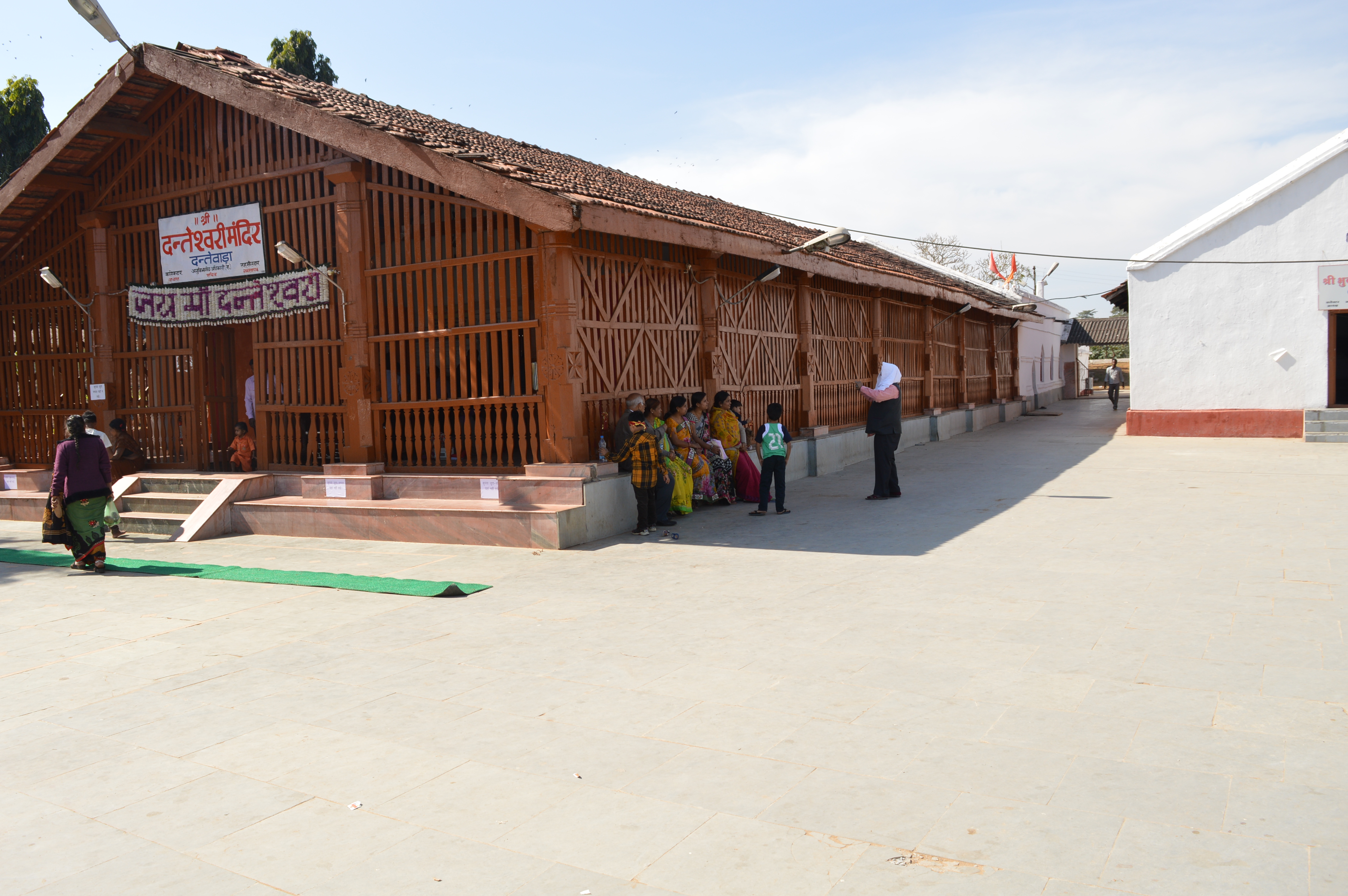

- Location in Chhattisgarh Danteshwari Temple (India)

Religion
- Affiliation: Hinduism
- District: Bastar
- Deity: Danteshwari (Shakti)

Location
- Location: Dantewada
- State: Chhattisgarh
- Country: India

Architecture
- Type: Hindu temple architecture
- Completed: 14th century

Website
- www.maadanteshwari.in

Danteshwari Temple is Hindu temple, dedicated to Goddess Danteshwari, and is one of the 52 Shakta pithas, shrines of Shakti, the divine feminine, spread across India. The temple built in the 14th century, is situated in Dantewada, a town situated 80 km from Jagdalpur Tehsil, Chhattisgarh. Dantewada is named after the Goddess Danteshwari, the presiding deity of the earlier Kakatiya rulers. Traditionally she is the Kuldevi (family goddess) of Bastar state.

The temple is as according legends, the spot where the Daanth or Tooth of Sati fell, during the episode when all the Shakti shrines were created in the Satya Yuga.

Every year during Dusshera thousands of tribals from surrounding villages and jungles gather here to pay homage to the goddess, when her idol was taken out of that ancient Danteshwari temple and then taken around the city in an elaborate procession, now a popular tourist attraction part of the 'Bastar Dussehra' festival. There also a is tradition of lighting Jyoti Kalashas during Navaratris here.

== Legend ==
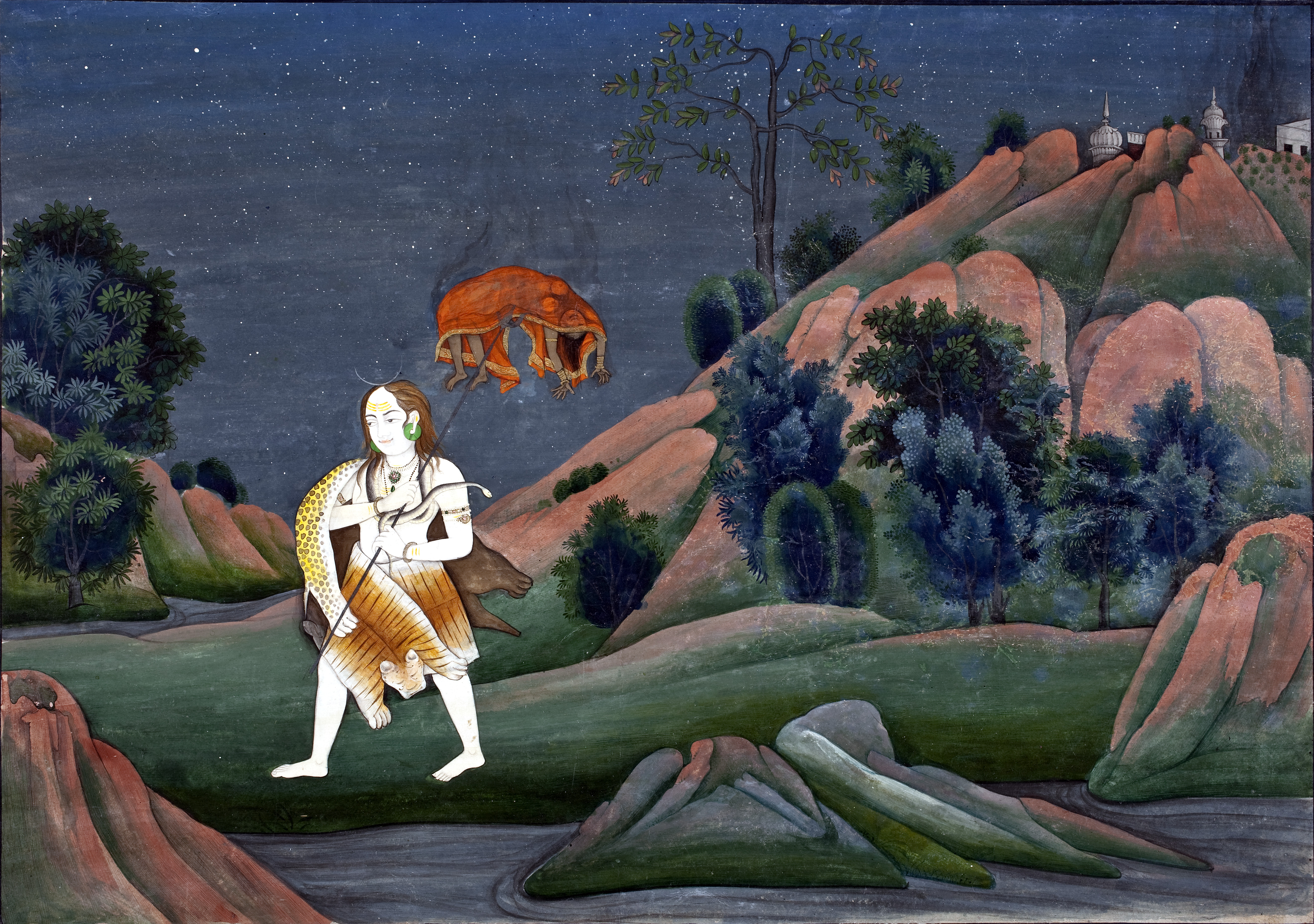
Shiva carrying the corpse of Dakshayani

It is believed that a tooth of Sati had fallen here and Danteshwari Shakta pitha was established. According to the ancient legend, Goddess Sati committed self-immolation in the fire pit of yagna kund, due to an insult committed by her father Daksha towards her consort Lord Shiva during the Yagna. Raged by the death of Sati, Shiva destroyed the Yagna of Daksha and with the body of Sati in his hands started to do 'Taandav'. Lord Vishnu cut the dead body of Goddess Sati with his Sudarshan Chakra to free Lord Shiva from the grief caused by her death. Parts of the dead body of Goddess Sati were scattered to fifty-two different places, which were consecrated as Shakta pitha.

== Architecture ==
The Danteshwari temple was built in the 14th Century. The idol of Danteshwari Mai is chiseled out of black stone. The temple is divided into four parts such as Garbh Griha, Maha Mandap, Mukhya Mandap and Sabha Mandap. Garbha Griha and Maha Mandap were constructed with stone pieces. There is a Garuda Pillar in front of the entrance of the temple. The temple itself is located in a spacious courtyard surrounded by massive walls. The shikhara is adorned with sculptural finery.

== Danteshwari temple Jagdalpur ==
Danteshwari Temple is the centre of the famous Bastar Dussehra. The devotion of locals, as well as tribals, is intricately linked to the presiding deity of Bastar. Unlike the idol of the goddess in Dantewada which is black in color, this idol is white.

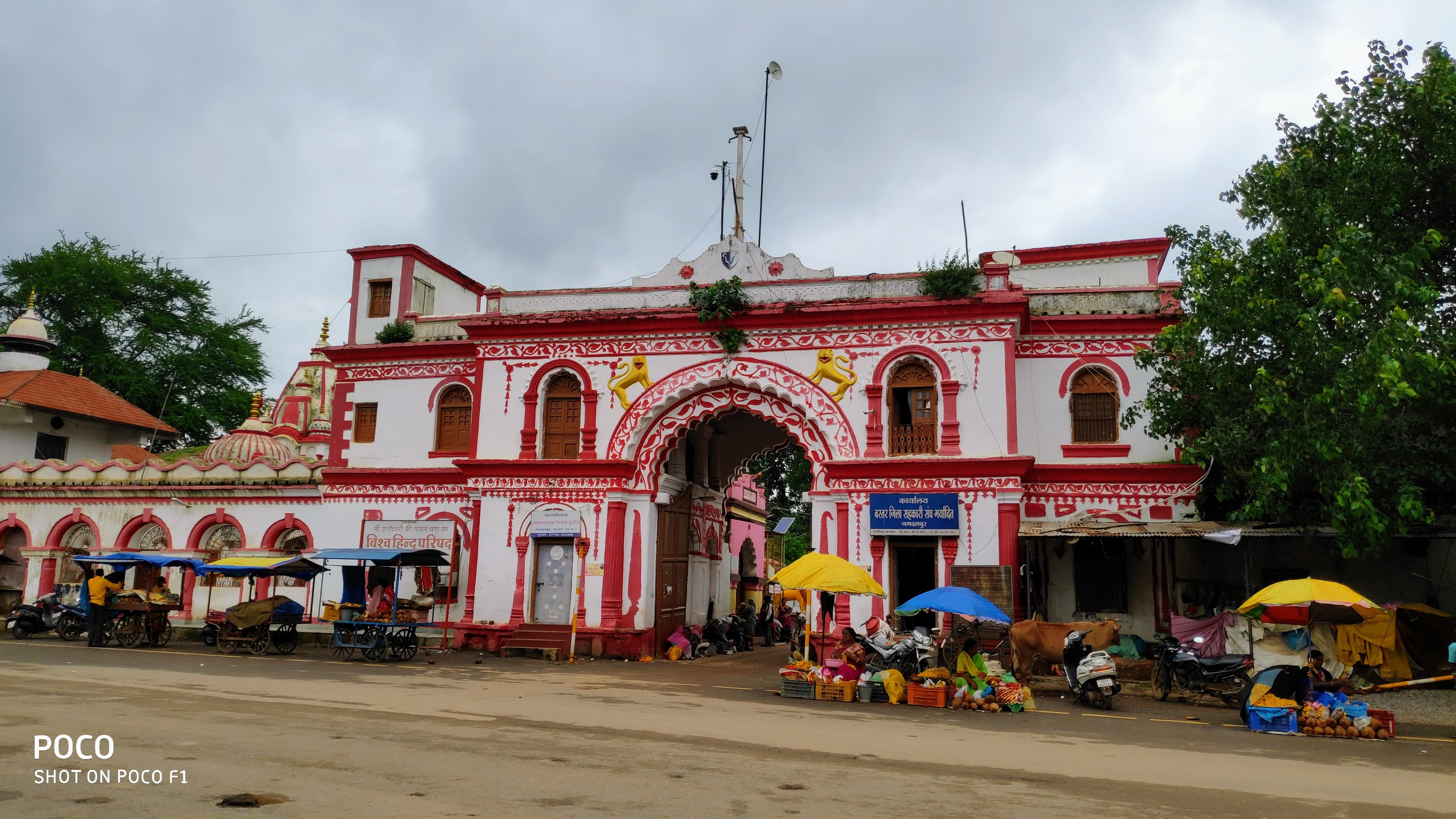
Entrance of Danteswari Temple complex

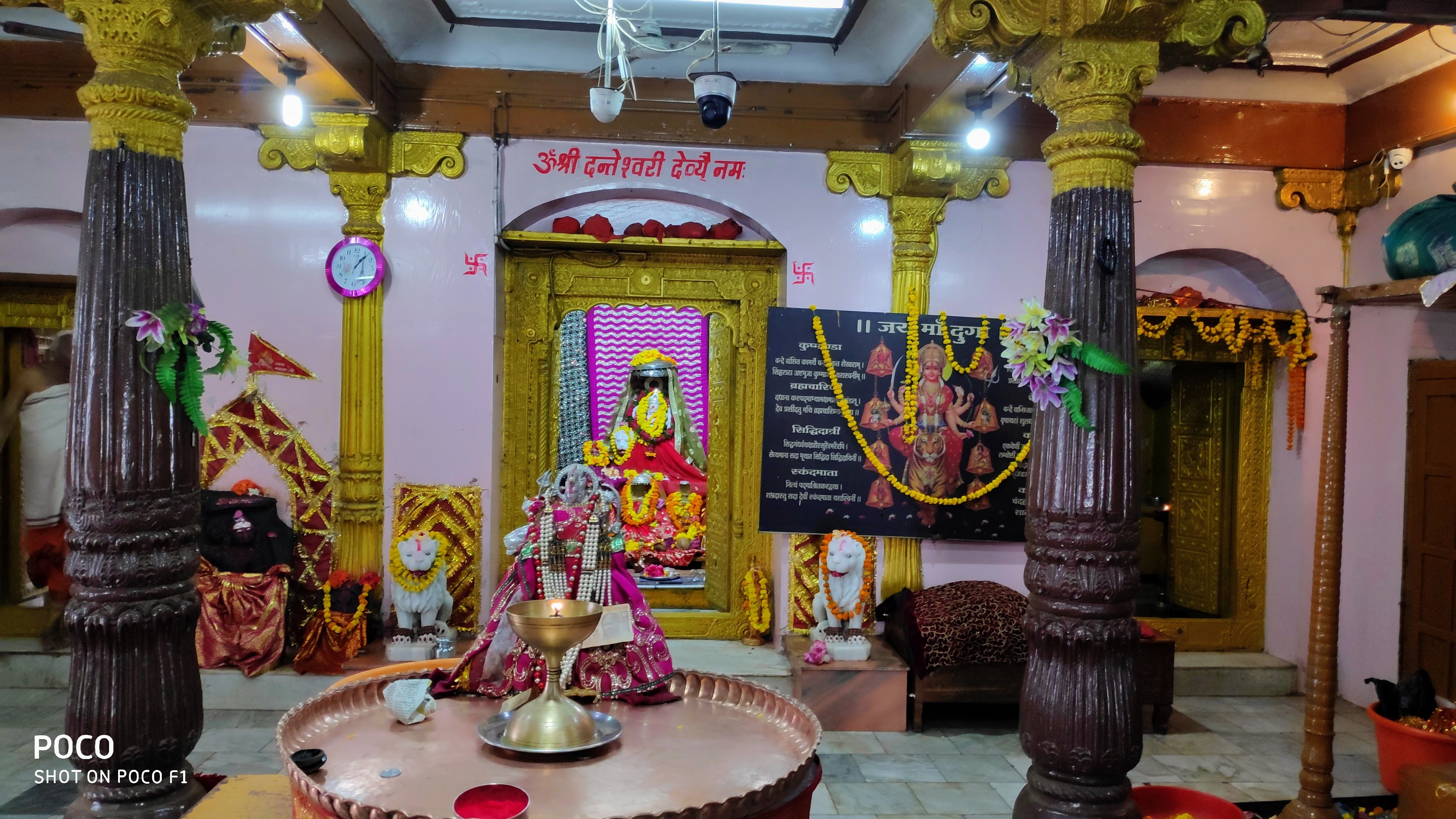
Goddess Danteswari

== See also ==
- List of Hindu temples in India
- Tamda Ghumar
- Chitrakote Falls
- Kotumsar Cave
- Mendri Ghumar
- Kanger Ghati National Park
- Indravati National Park
