= Sivniguda =

- town
- Country: India
- State: Chhattisgarh
- District: Bastar

Languages
  - Official: Hindi, Chhattisgarhi
- Time zone: UTC+5:30 (IST)
- Vehicle registration: CG
- Nearest city: Jagdalpur

Sivniguda is a town in Bastar district, Chhattisgarh, India.

== Location ==
Sivniguda is 40 km from Jagdalpur. Chitrakot waterfalls is towards south west of Sivniguda. The nearest airport is Raipur Airport and railway station is at Jagdalpur.

National Highway 43 passes through Sivniguda.

== See also ==
- Chitrakot
