= Teerathgarh Falls =

Coordinates: 18°54′51″N 81°51′55″E

Thirathgarh Falls
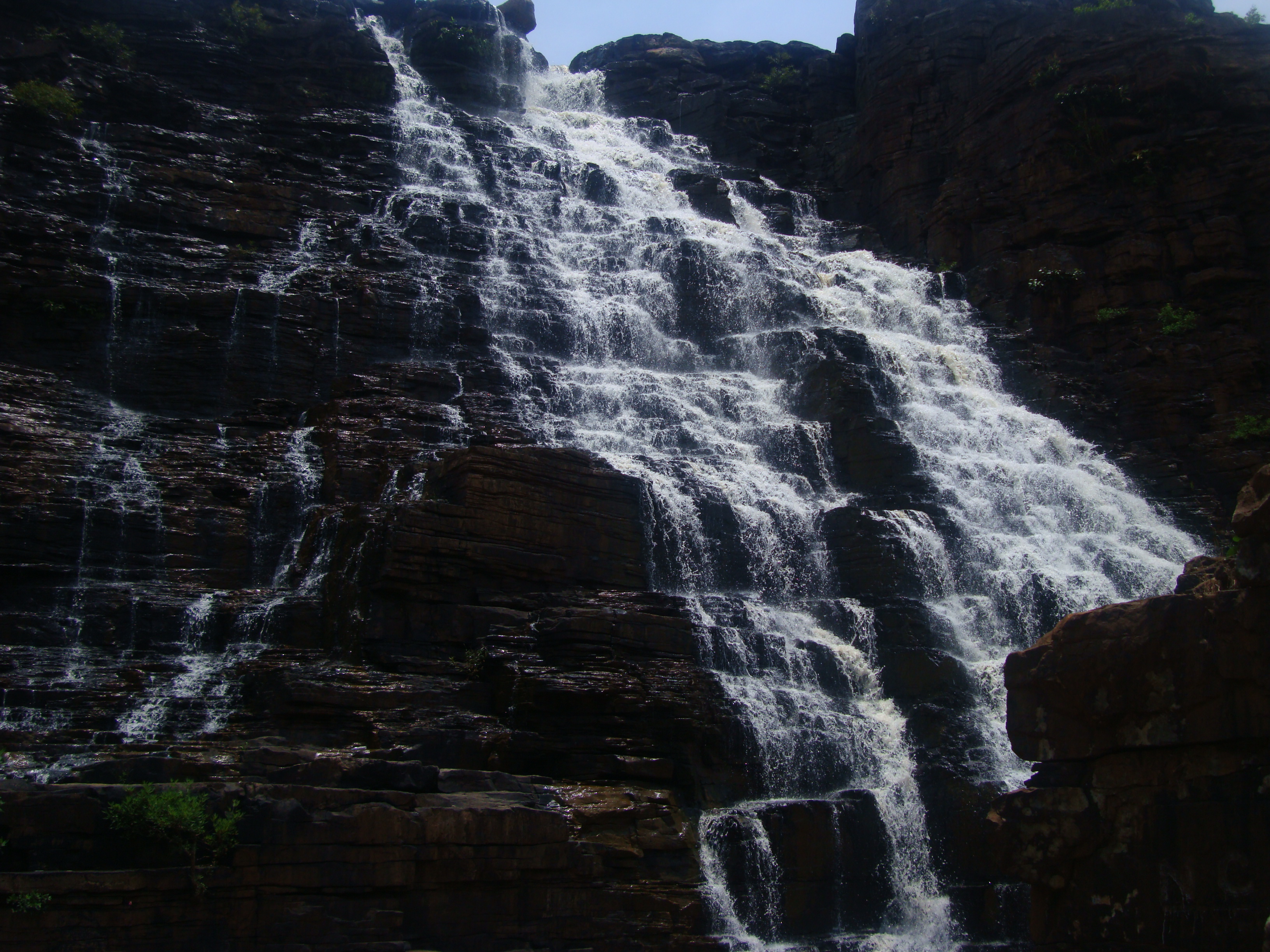
- Interactive map of Thirathgarh Falls
- Location: Bastar district, Chhattisgarh, India
- Type: Block
- Total height: 91 metres (299 ft)
- Number of drops: 3
- Watercourse: Kanger River

Thirathgarh Falls is a waterfall about 35 kilometres from Jagdalpur in Bastar district, Chhattisgarh, India. It is on the Munga Bahar River and falls about 300 feet below a stepped hillside of natural rock formations.

== The falls ==
The Teerathgarh Falls is a block type waterfall on the Kanger River. The water plunges 91 metres (299 ft) in a single drop.

== Location ==
It is located at a distance of 35 kilometres (22 mi) south-west of Jagdalpur. One can approach the falls from Darbha, near the state highway that connects Jagdalpur to Sukma. One has to take a jeep at Darbha junction to visit Teerathgarh and Kutumsar. Kutumsar Caves and Kailash Gufa are nearby attractions. It is in Kanger Ghati National Park.

== See also ==
- List of waterfalls
- List of waterfalls in India
- List of waterfalls in India by height
- Tamda Ghumar
- Chitrakote Falls
- Kotumsar Cave
- Mendri Ghumar
- Jagdalpur
- Kanger Ghati National Park
- Indravati National Park
- Danteshwari Temple
