= Kotumsar Cave =

Cave in Chhattisgarh, India

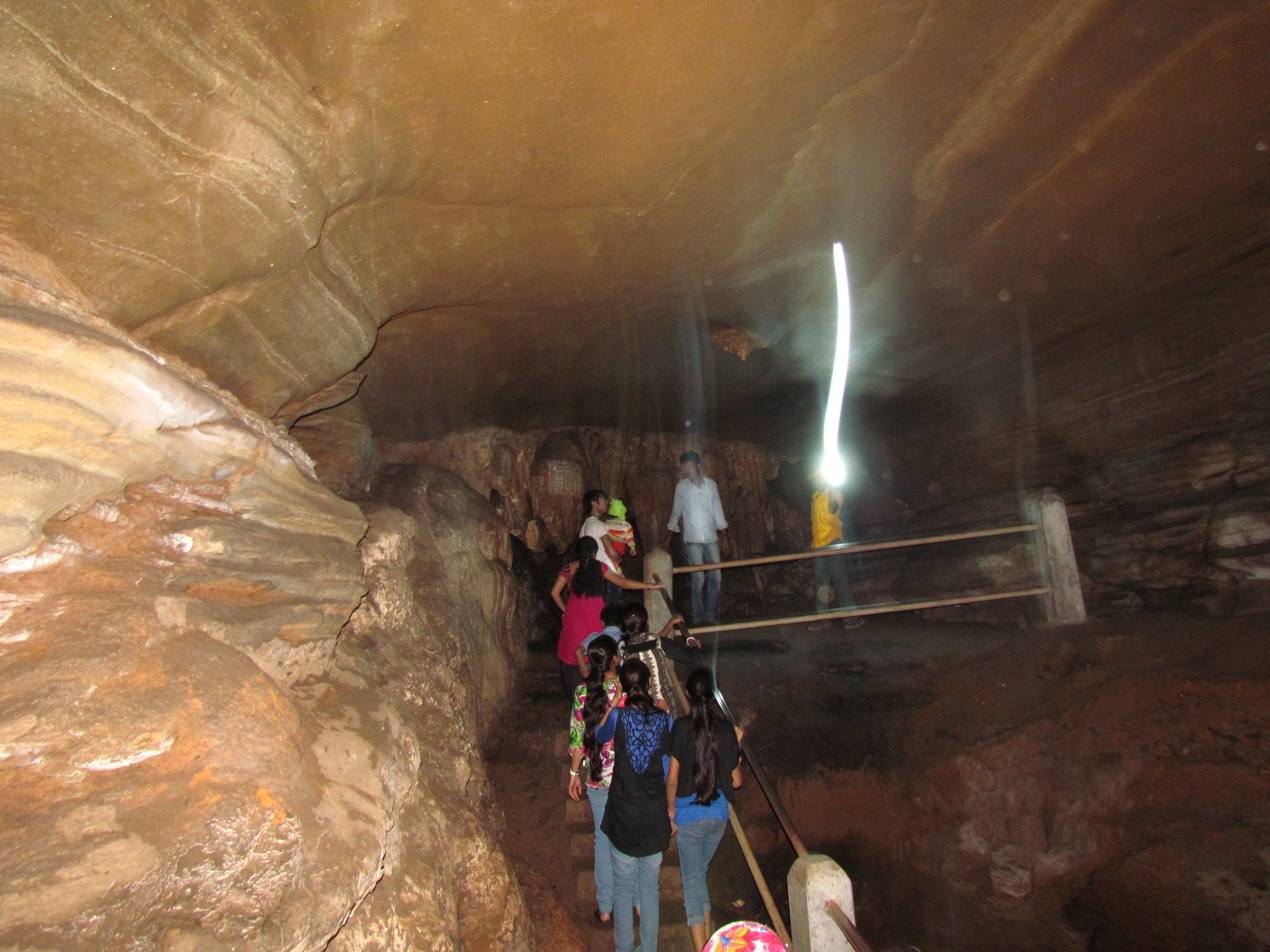
Tourists inside the cave

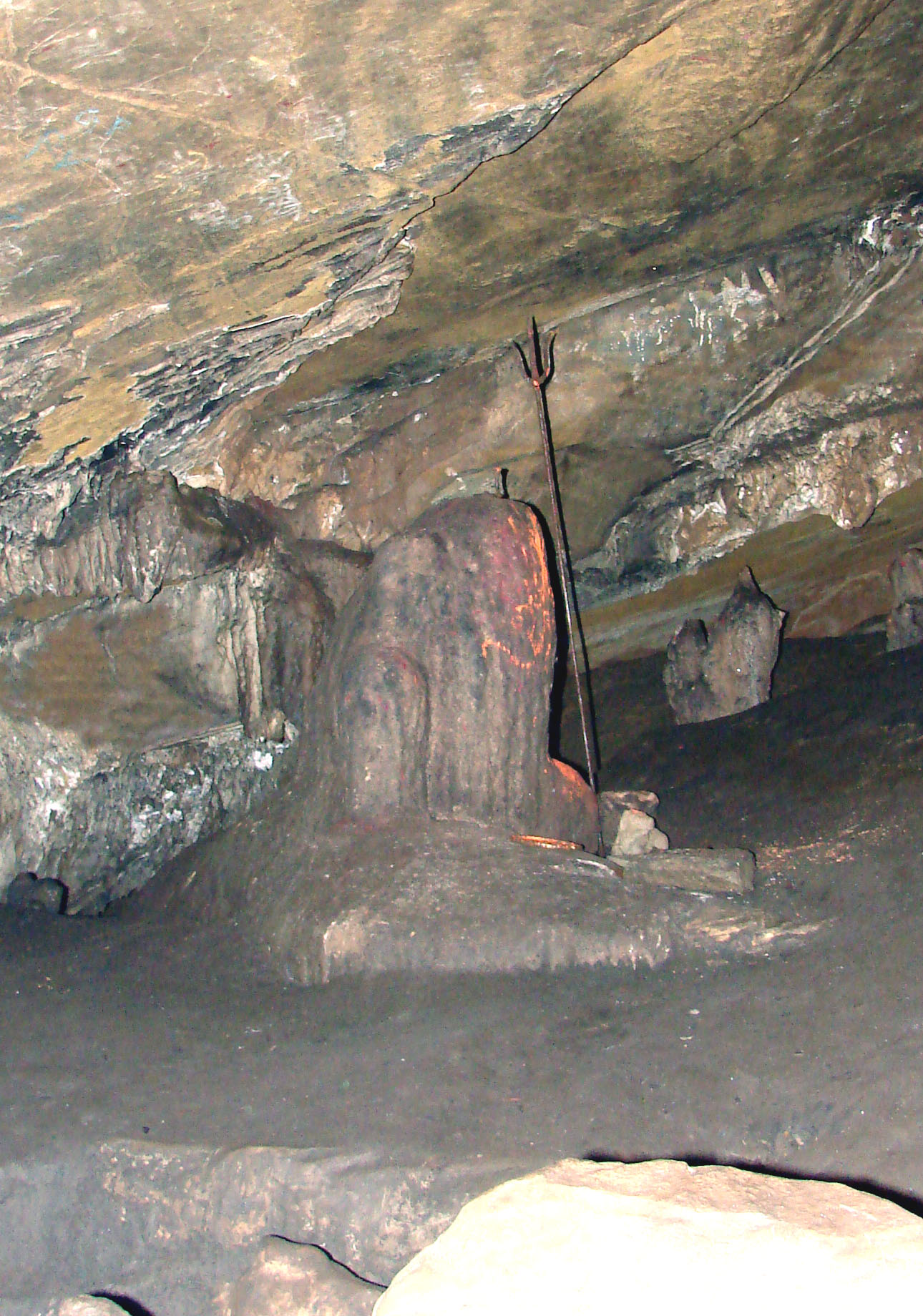
Religious site in the cave

Kotumsar Cave is a limestone cave located near Jagdalpur in the Indian state of Chhattisgarh. Kotumsar cave is a major attraction for people interested in ecotourism. It was initially known as Gopansar cave (Gopan = "hidden") but the present name, Kotumsar, became more popular because the cave is located near a village named Kotumsar. Kotumsar cave formed in the Kanger limestone belt, situated near the banks of the Kanger River, a tributary of the Kolab River.

== Conditions and characteristics ==
The entrance coordinates are 18052’09”N; 81056’05” E (WGS 84) and it lies at an altitude of 560 m above sea level. A vertical fissure in the wall of a hill serves as the main entry for the cave, and from there for the convenience of tourists a concrete path has been made extending to the end of the cave. The main tunnel of the cave is nearly 200 m long with several lateral and downward passages. Various types of speleothems offer panoramic views. Air and water temperatures are relatively stable with an annual average of 28.25 ± 1.23 and 26.33 ± 0.96 °C, respectively (range = 25.0–32.7_C for air; 22.9–29.3 °C for water). The cave is subject to frequent flooding during the monsoon season, which generally begins in the middle of June and continues until the middle of October. The site is closed to tourists during this period. Various water pools fed by seepage throughout the year also exist in this cave.

== Religion ==
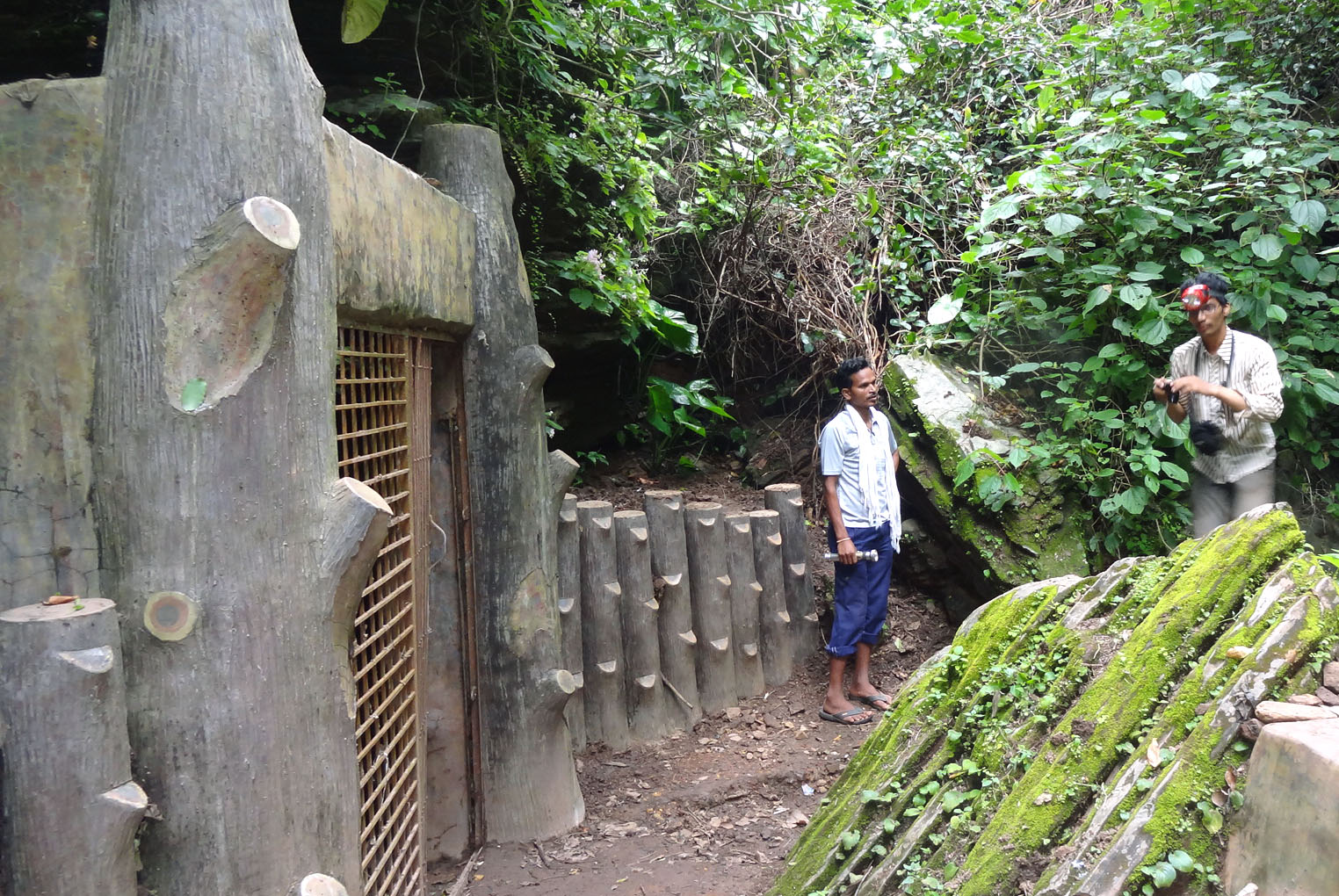
Entrance Gate of Kotumsar Cave

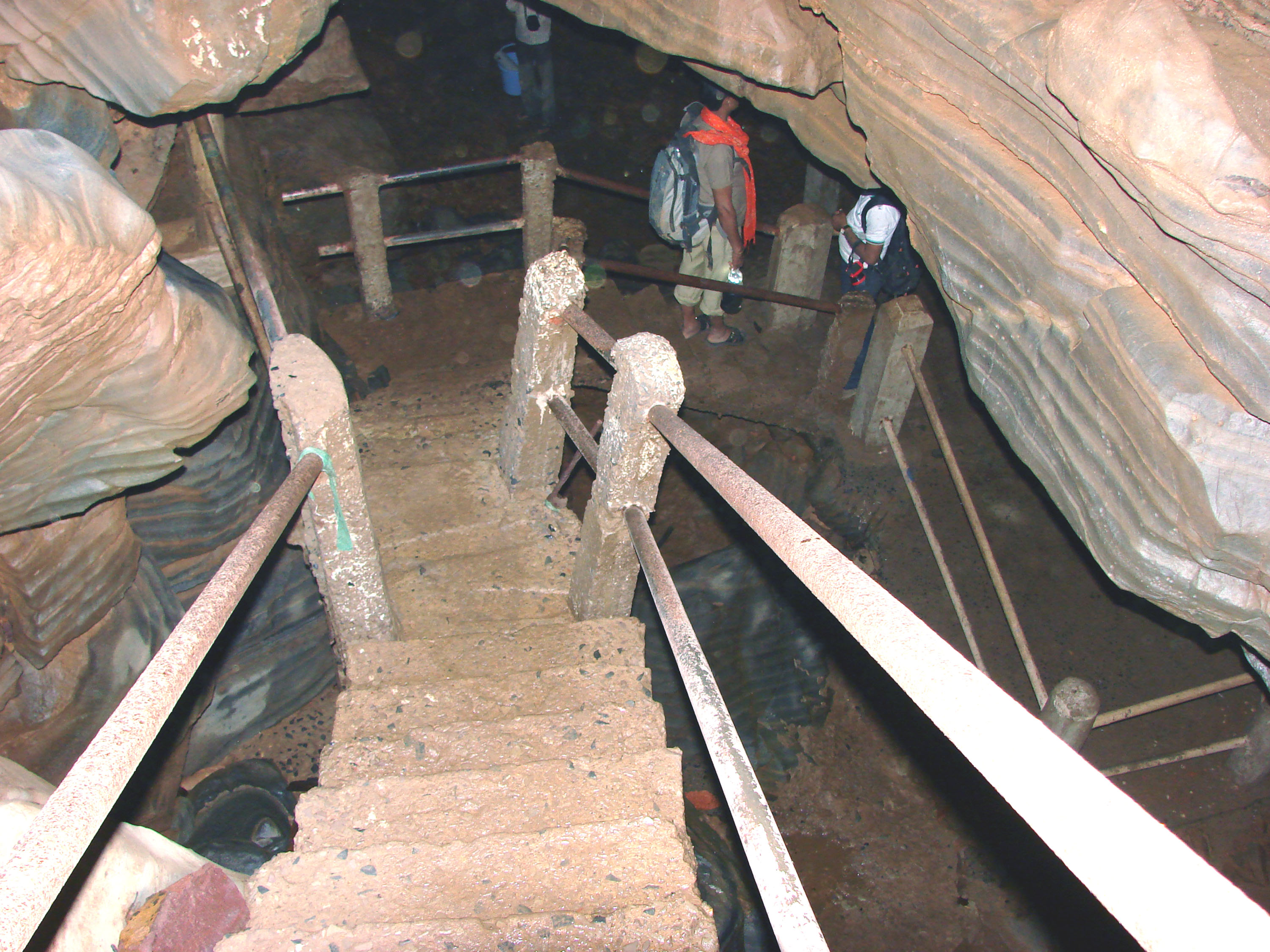
Entrance of Kotumsar cave

According to Hindu mythology, caves are generally considered to be prominent religious locations. Many pilgrims visit Kotumsar cave to worship at a big speleothem formation (stalagmite) in one of the chambers. Earlier worshipers also burnt incense and camphor in this part of Kotumsar Cave, which polluted the cave ecosystem resulting in a decline of cave biodiversity. This practice was accordingly stopped by the authorities based on a report published by the National Cave research and Protection Organization, India.

== History ==
The cave has been known since the British era of India, but it was not taken seriously until the 1950s when the geography professor Dr. Shankar Tiwari visited the cave and attempted to explore its chambers with limited resources and equipment. The cave was first systematically mapped in the 1980s by Dr. Jayant Biswas (then a PhD scholar), guided by a Romanian caver. The map was first published in Biswas's PhD dissertation in 1990, and in 1992 by him in the internationally recognized publication of the National Speleological Society .

== New chamber ==
In 2011 a small but highly panoramic chamber was discovered and explored by forest officials. As the approach is not easy, it is closed to tourists.

== Access ==
Kotumsar cave is situated in Kanger Valley National Park, which is around 35 km from the city of Jagdalpur, the district headquarters of Bastar, in the state of Chhattisgarh. Jagdalpur can be reached either by road, train or air. The city is well connected by National Highways 212, 202 and 16. The nearest airport is the Maa Danteshwari Airport of Jagdalpur.

To reach the park one follows the Jagdalpur, Sukma road. The cave is located around 10 km from the main entrance of the national park.

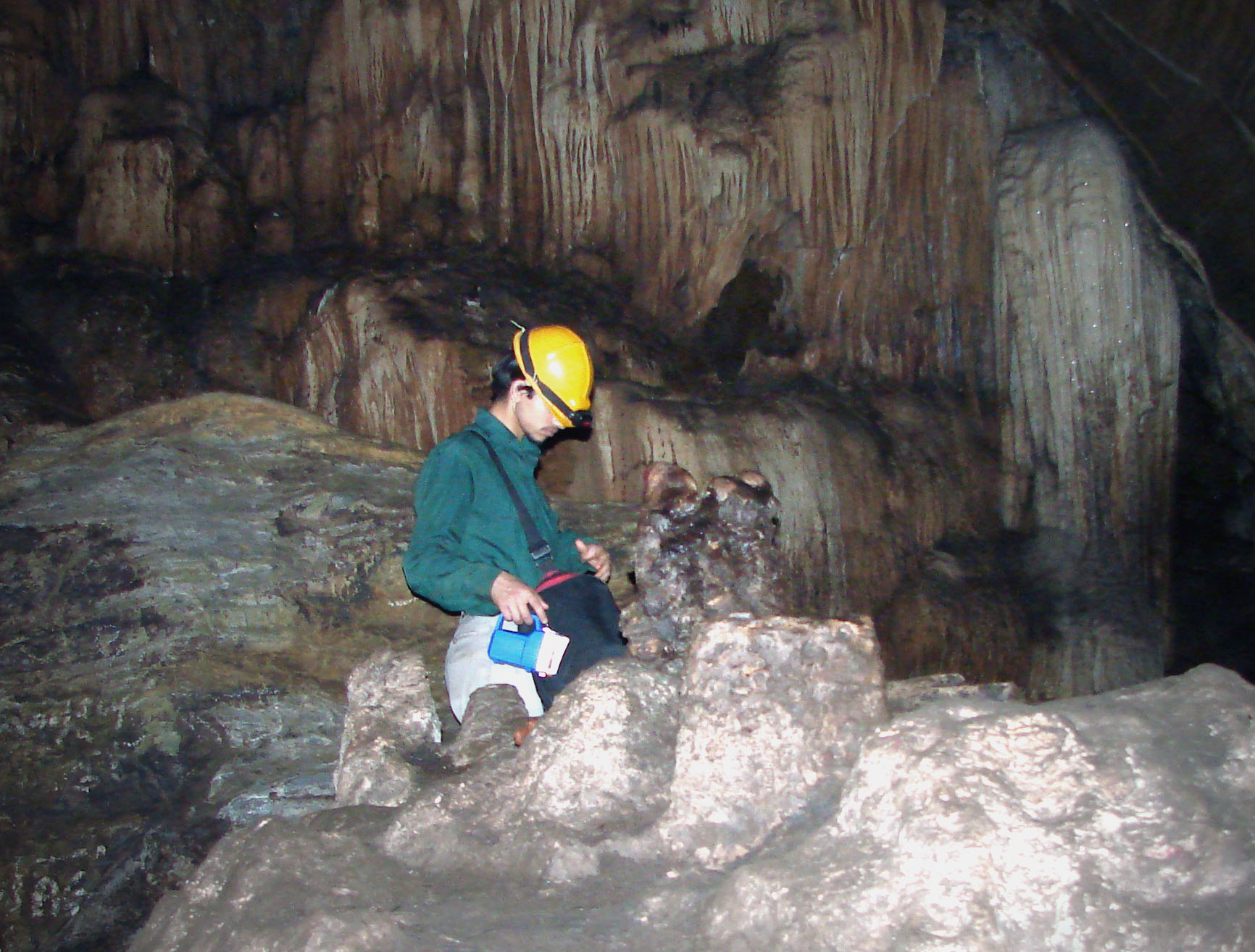
Researcher studying biodiversity

== Biodiversity ==
The Kotumsar Cave in Central India is one of the most biologically explored caves in India,. While surveying the Kotumsar cave one of Dr. Shankar Tiwari's then colleagues Dr. S.M. Agarwal, a biologist took interest in the biodiversity of the Kotumsar cave. He identified a species of blind fish that occupy this cave as Indoreonectes evezardi (then Nemacheilus evezardi) with the help of the British Museum. New species of crickets namely Kempiola shankari were also discovered here. The name of the discovered critter was given in honour of Dr. Shankar Tiwari. Later on several other species were also discovered in the cave by taxonomists (mostly arthropods), geomicrobiologists from the National Cave Research and Protection Organization (India) also identified various bacteria that live in the cave.

The complete biodiversity of this cave has been well described by Dr. Jayant Biswas in the year 2010. There are many more caves identified around 5 km radius of this caves, but Kotumsar cave is the most biologically live cave of Kanger Valley National Park having healthy biodiversity.

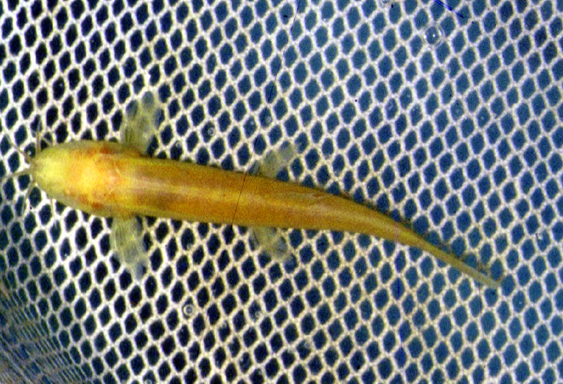
The blind and albinic cavefish ( Nemacheilus evezardi) from Kotumsar Cave, India

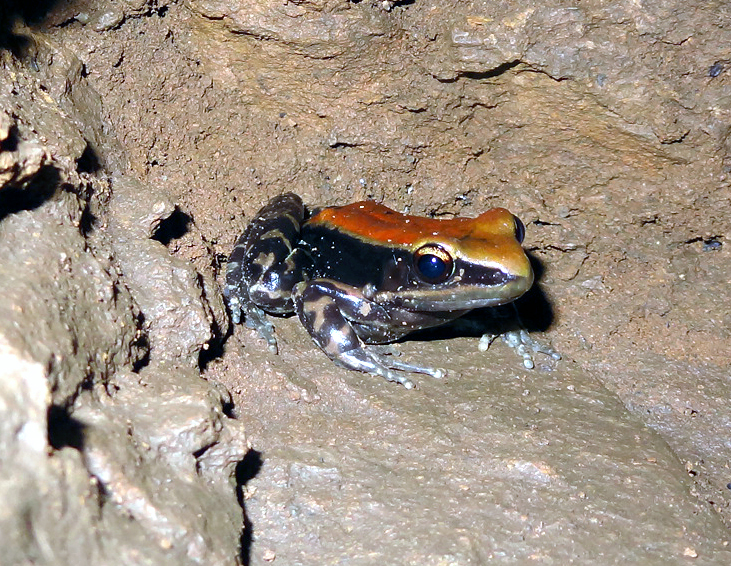
Hylarana malabarica inside Kotumsar Cave

== See also ==
- Tamda Ghumar
- Chitrakote Falls
- Teerathgarh Falls
- Mendri Ghumar
- Jagdalpur
