= Tamda Ghumar =

Natural waterfalls in Chhattisgarh, India

- तामड़ा घूमड़
- Location within Chhattisgarh
- Location: Jagdalpur, India
- Coordinates: 19°10′22″N 81°37′45″E
- Type: Cascade
- Total height: 100 feet (30 m)

The Tamda Ghumar Waterfalls (Hindi: तामड़ा घूमड़) is a seasonal and natural waterfall located at around 45 kilometres (28 mi) to the west of Jagdalpur, in Bastar district in the Indian state of Chhattisgarh. It is very close to Chitrakote and Mendri Ghumar Waterfalls.

== Topography ==
Tamda Ghumar Waterfalls is located at around 45 km from Jagdalpur. It is very close to Chitrakote and Mendri Ghumar Waterfalls. The height of the fall is about 100 feet and is generally formed in the rainy season. There are green fields on either side of this waterfall. Just like Chitrakote and Teerathgarh Falls, the Tamda Ghumar Falls is a scenic spot near Chitrakote Falls.

The natural environment of the area, its forested lands, deep valleys and hills attract tourists towards it. Even though the waterfalls lies in a secluded location, tourists still make it a point to come here for picnicking. The best season to visit this place is Monsoon.

== See also ==
- List of waterfalls
- List of waterfalls in India
- Chitrakote Falls
- Teerathgarh Falls
- Kotumsar Cave
- Mendri Ghumar
- Jagdalpur
