= Maa Danteswari Airport =

Airport in Jagdalpur, Chhattisgarh India

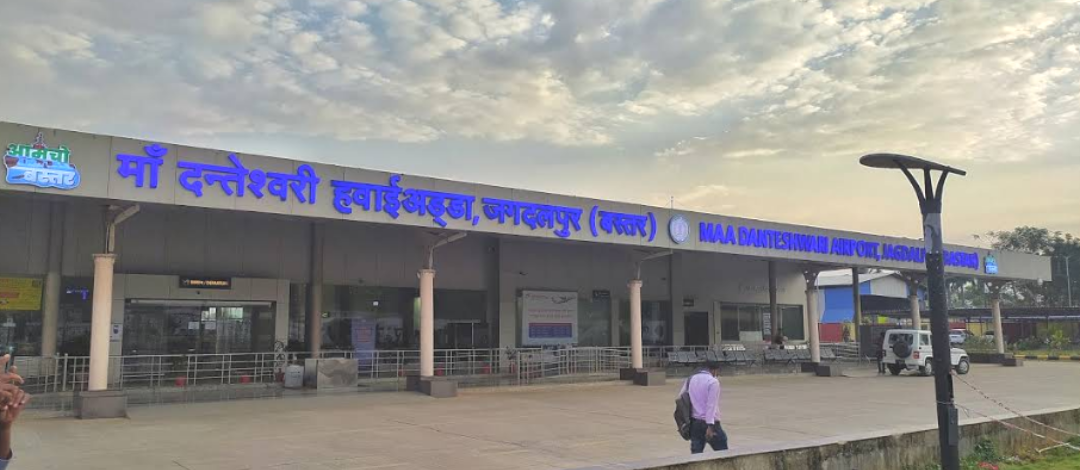
- IATA: JGB; ICAO: VEJR

Summary
- Airport type: Public
- Owner: Government of Chhattisgarh
- Operator: Government of Chhattisgarh
- Serves: Jagdalpur
- Location: Jagdalpur, Chhattisgarh, India
- Elevation AMSL: 555 m (1,821 ft)
- Coordinates: 19°04′28″N 082°02′13″E
- Website: https://jagdalpurairport.com

Map
- Location of airport in Chhattisgarh and India JGB (India)

Runways
Direction	Length		Surface
Direction	m	ft	Surface
06/24	1,707	5,600	Asphalt

Statistics (April 2025 - March 2026)
- Passengers: 64,679 (▼ -13.1%)
- Aircraft movements: 1,342 (▼ -15.5%)
- Cargo tonnage: —
- Source: AAI

Maa Danteswari Airport (IATA: JGB, ICAO: VEJR), also known as Jagdalpur Airport, is a domestic airport serving the city of Jagdalpur in the state of Chhattisgarh, India. The Airports Authority of India (AAI) conducted a pre-feasibility study in July 2013 for development of the airport and approved of operations of aircraft under Visual Flight Rules (VFR) conditions. The airport was chosen for an upgrade under the Government's UDAN scheme and the ground breaking ceremony for the construction of a terminal building was performed in January 2017. It was upgraded to 3C category in 2019, allowing the operations of ATR-72 type of aircraft. On 21 September 2020, Alliance Air started flights to Hyderabad and Raipur using an ATR-72. The airport's name was changed on 21 September 2020.

== Development ==
The district administration has floated a proposal to set up a new airport for Jagdalpur in Ulnar village of Bastar district. This airport is expected to be set up in an area measuring 250 hectares. It would have a 1.7 km long and 30 metres wide runway. The airport would reportedly have a state of the art terminal building. Since about 92% (229 hectares) of the land required is owned by the government, the land acquisition process is expected to be quick leading to a faster development time for the airport.

== Airlines and destinations ==
Airlines	Destinations
Alliance Air	Hyderabad, Raipur.
IndiGo	Hyderabad, Raipur

== See also ==
- Swami Vivekananda Airport, Raipur
- Bilasa Devi Kevat Airport, Bilaspur
- List of airports in India
- List of the busiest airports in India
