= Mendri Ghumar =

- मेंद्री घूमर
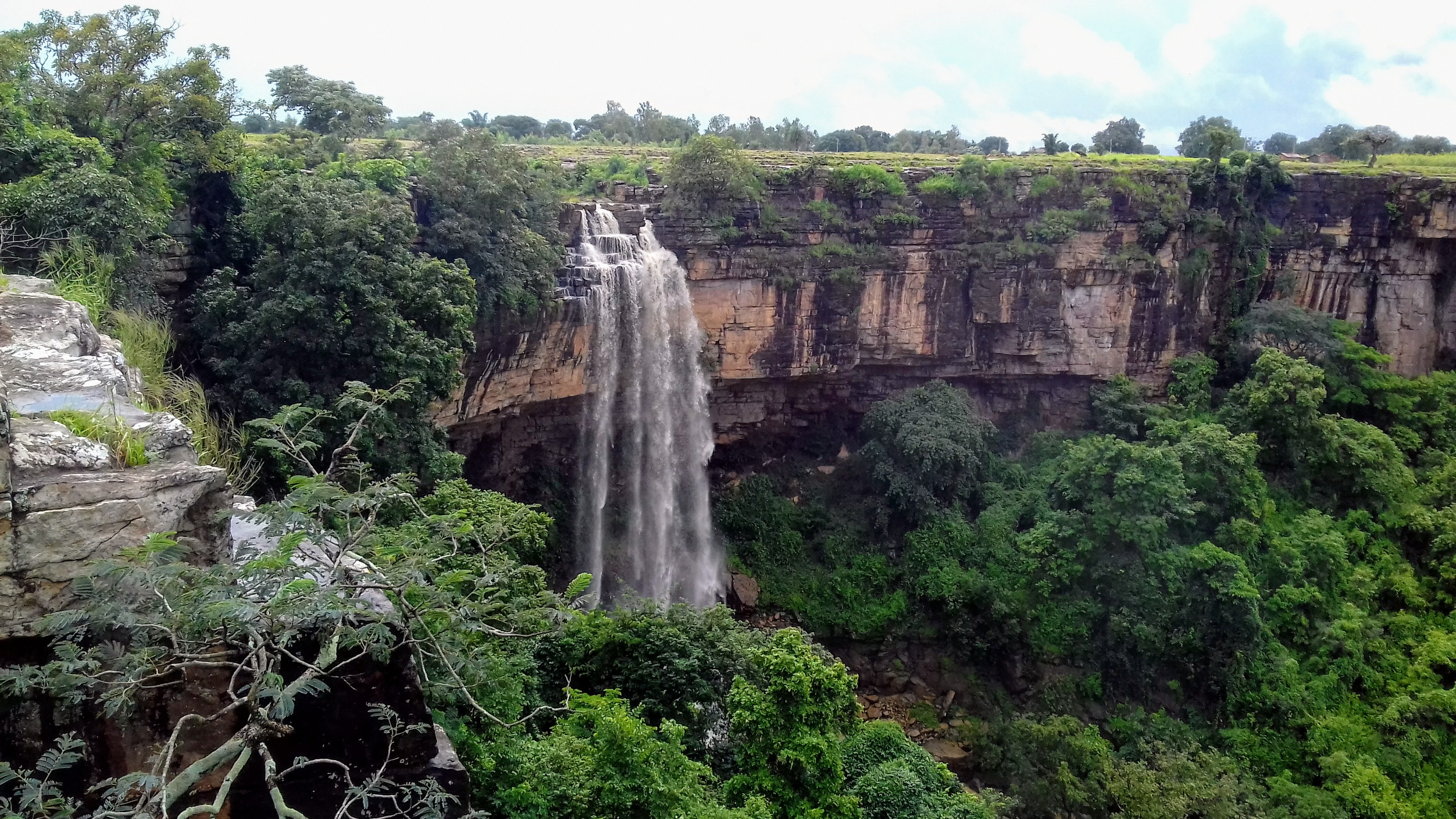
- Mendri Ghumar Waterfalls, Aug 2017.

- Location within Chhattisgarh
- Location: Jagdalpur, India
- Coordinates: 19°09′55″N 81°39′48″E
- Type: Cascade
- Total height: Almost 70 metres (230 ft)

The Mendri Ghumar Waterfalls (Hindi: मेंद्री घूमर) is a seasonal and natural waterfall located at around 44 kilometres (27 mi) to the west of Jagdalpur, in Bastar district in the Indian state of Chhattisgarh. It is very close to Chitrakote and Tamda Ghumar Waterfalls.

== Topography ==
Mendri Ghumar Waterfall is located in the middle of Chitrakote Falls, Tirtha and Barasur and situated in Jagdalpur. The height of the fall is almost 70 meters with a lush green surrounding and eye-catching places. The interesting part is that the Mendri Ghumar Waterfall forms its best during the rainy seasons. The water collected from the rains, continuously flows through the hill thus making it an eye-catching waterfall. It is surrounded by lush green forest on both its sides, making it one of the most well-liked ecotourism destinations in the state.

The Mendri Ghumar Waterfall has its own versions, during the summer and monsoons. The waterfall over flows during the monsoons, wherein the water gushes slowly and calmly during the summers.

== See also ==
- List of waterfalls
- List of waterfalls in India
- Tamda Ghumar
- Chitrakote Falls
- Teerathgarh Falls
- Kotumsar Cave
- Jagdalpur
