= Jagdalpur =

City in Chhattisgarh, India

Jagdalpur Jagatuguda
- Metro
- Jagdalpur city
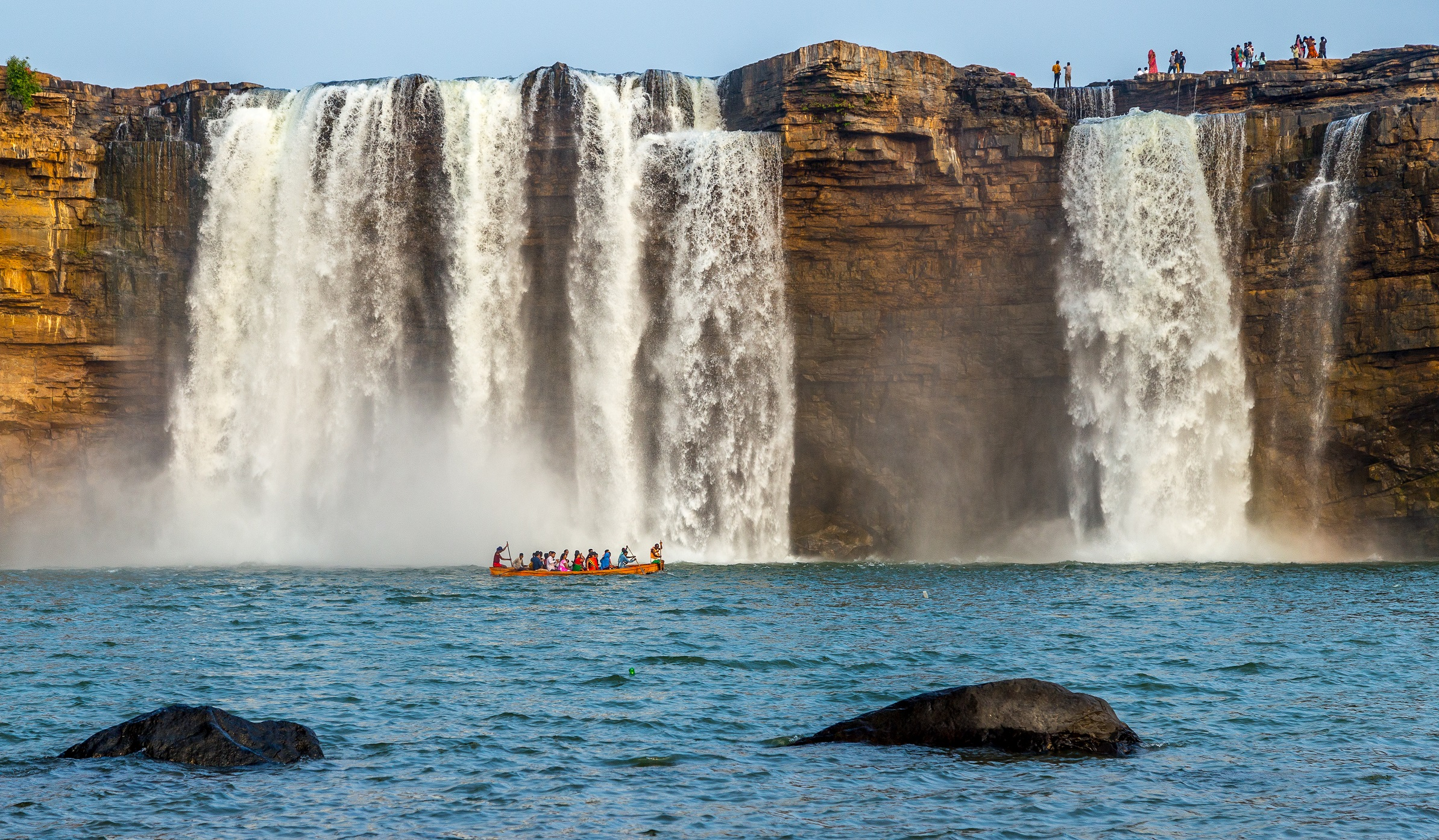
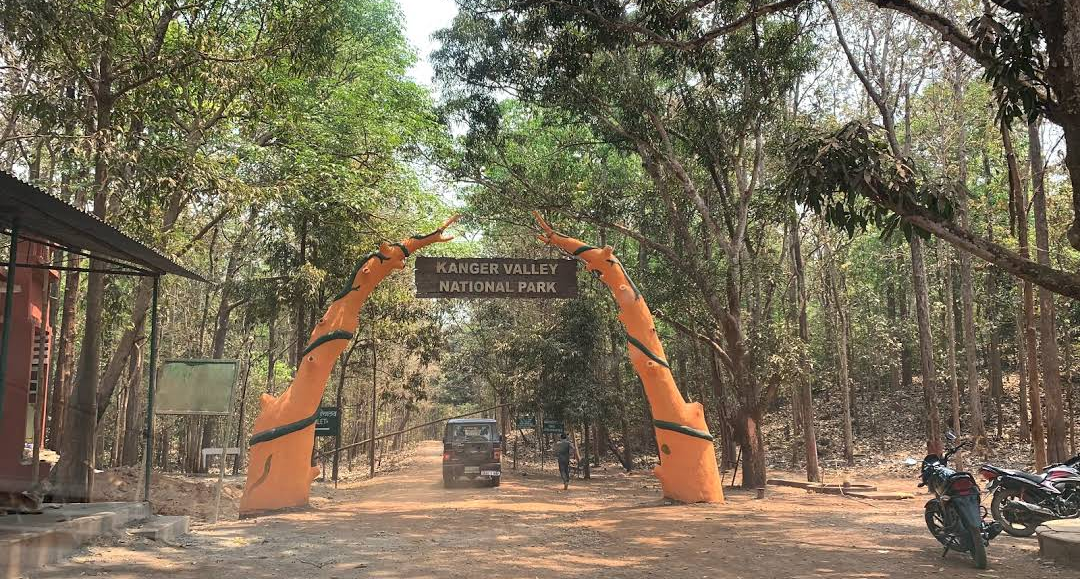
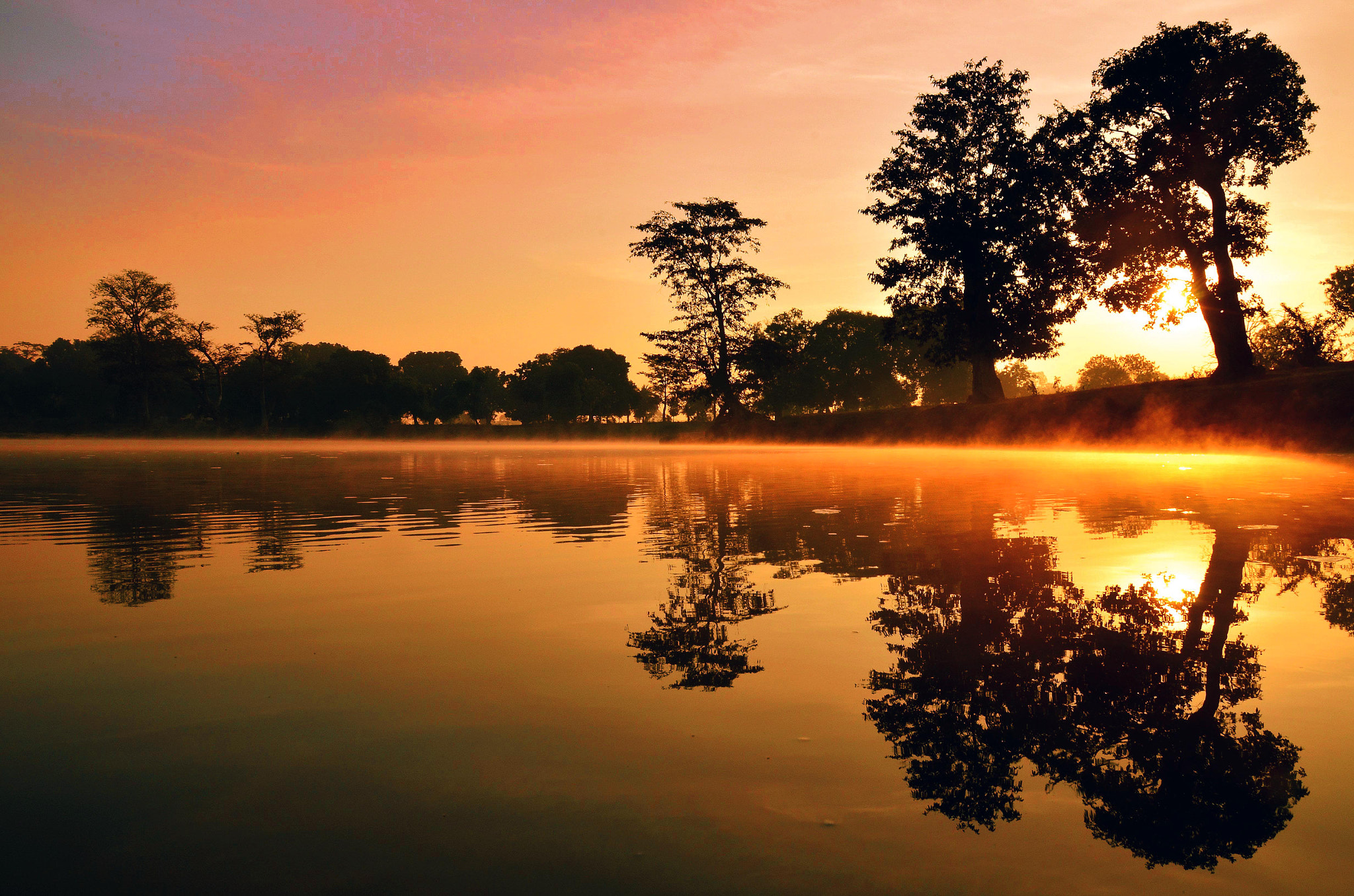
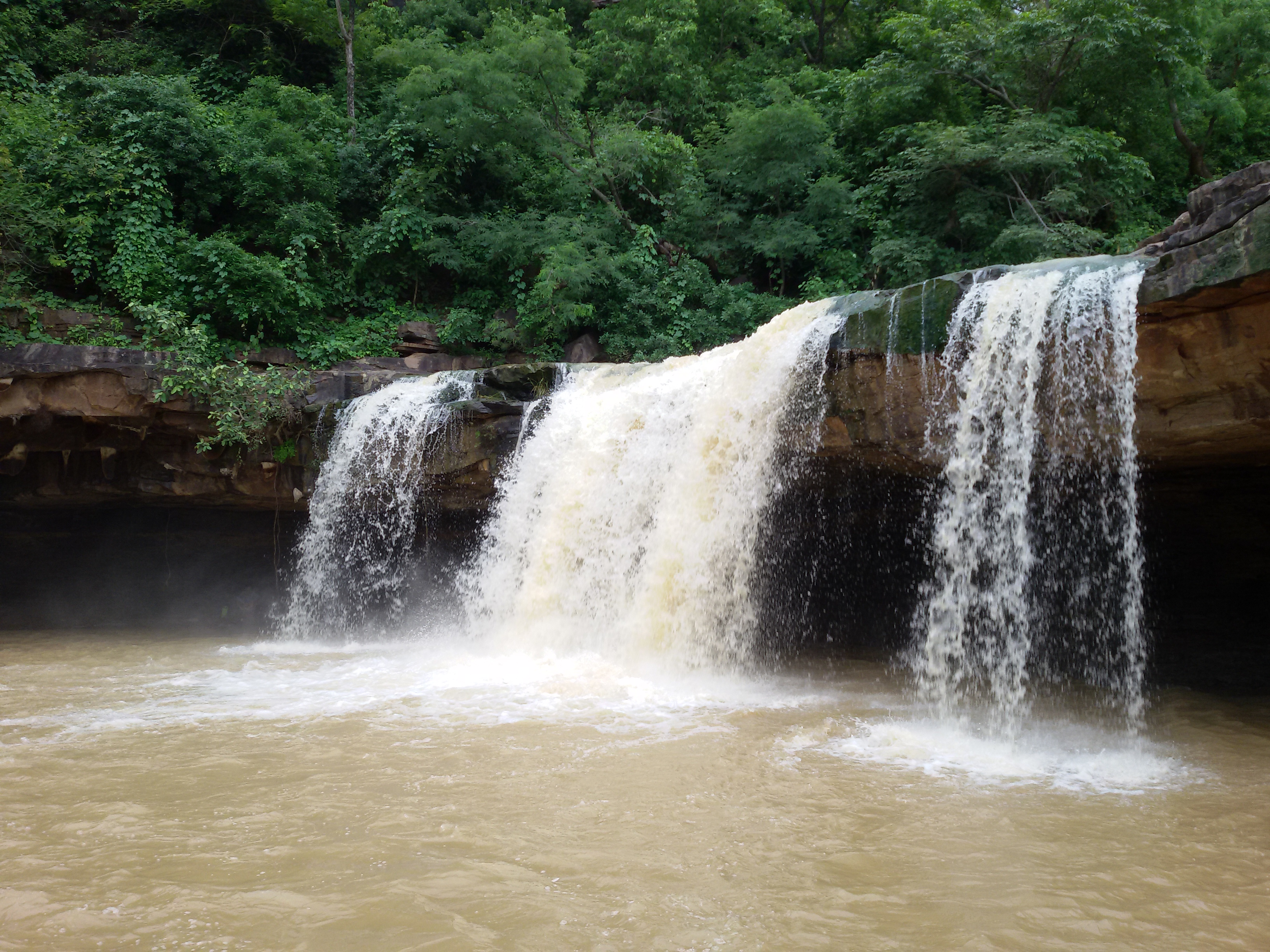
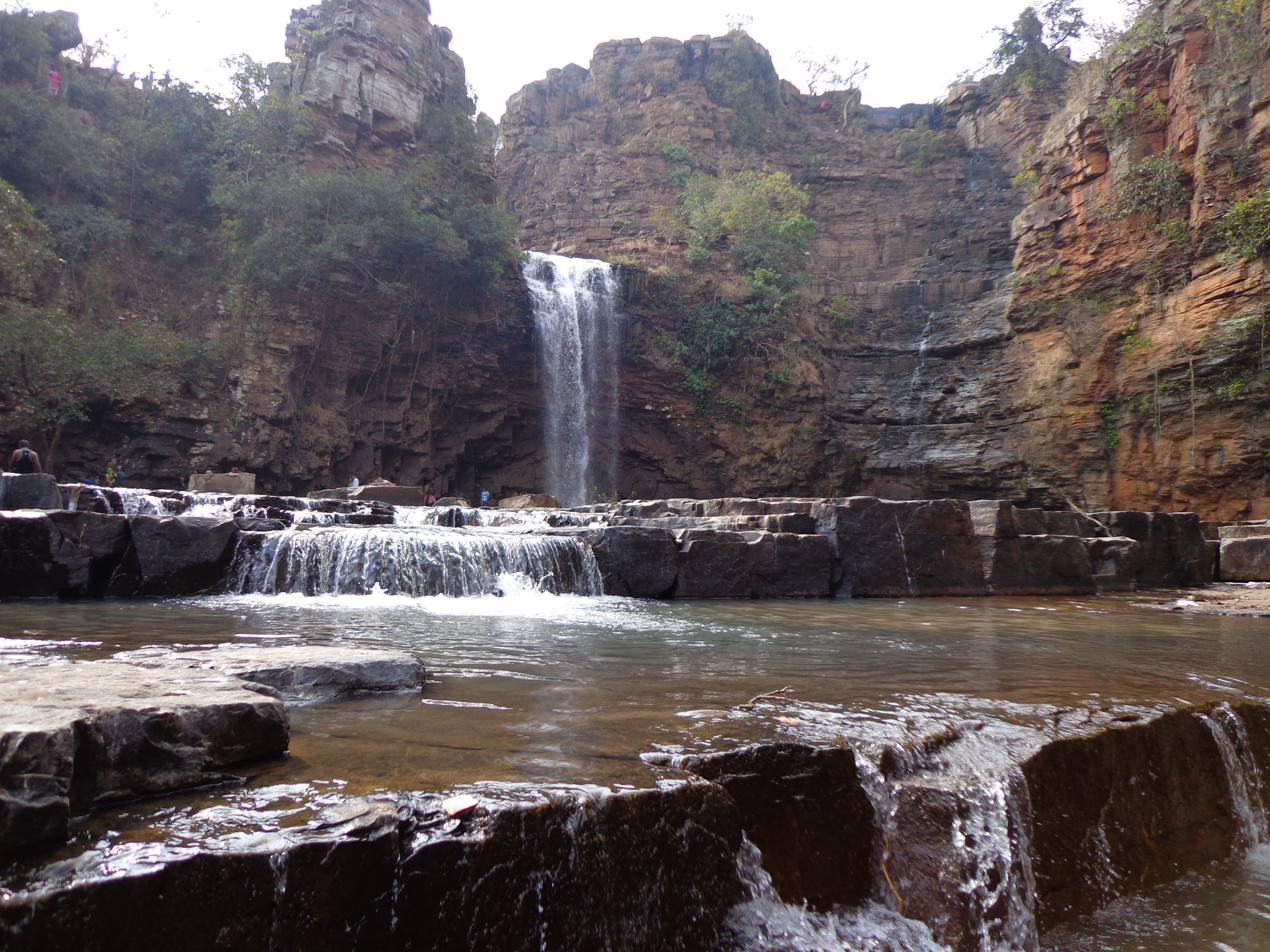
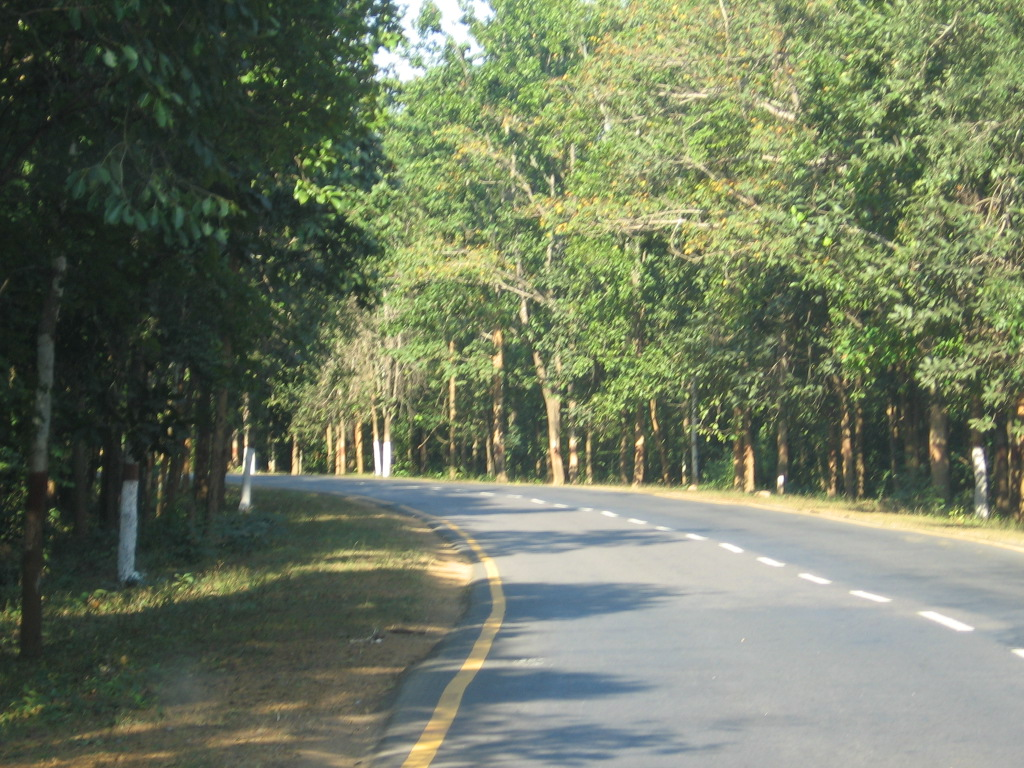
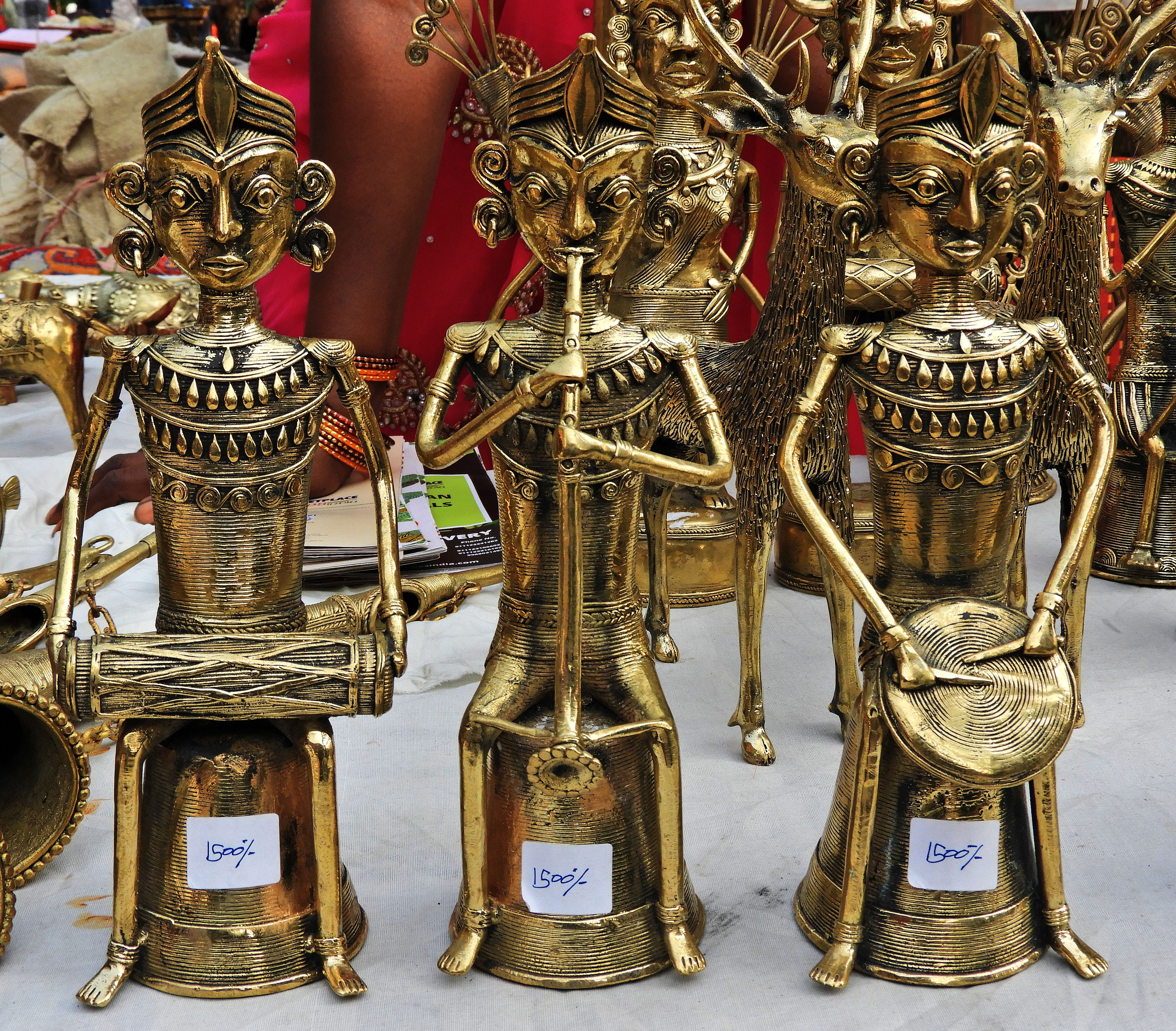
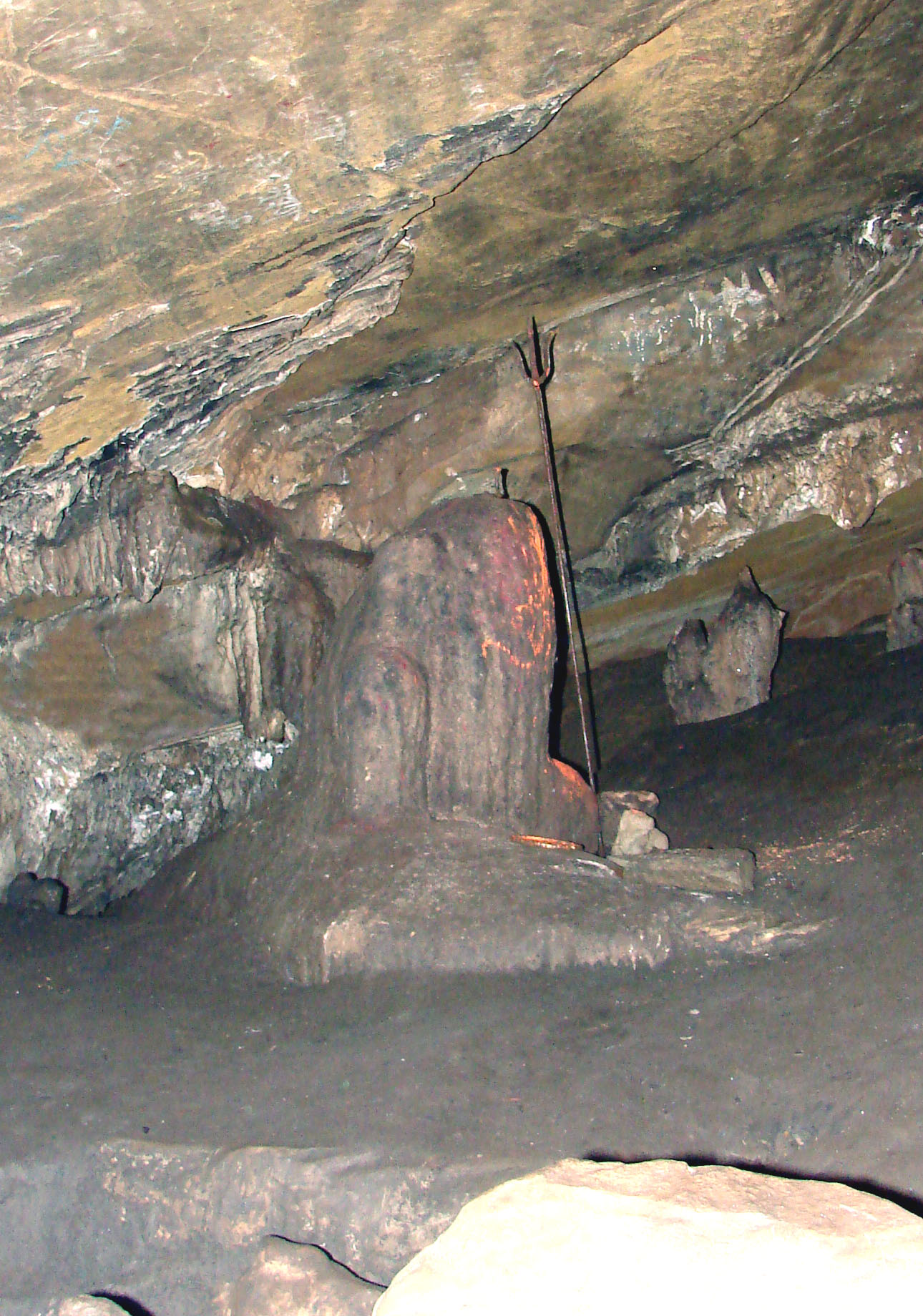
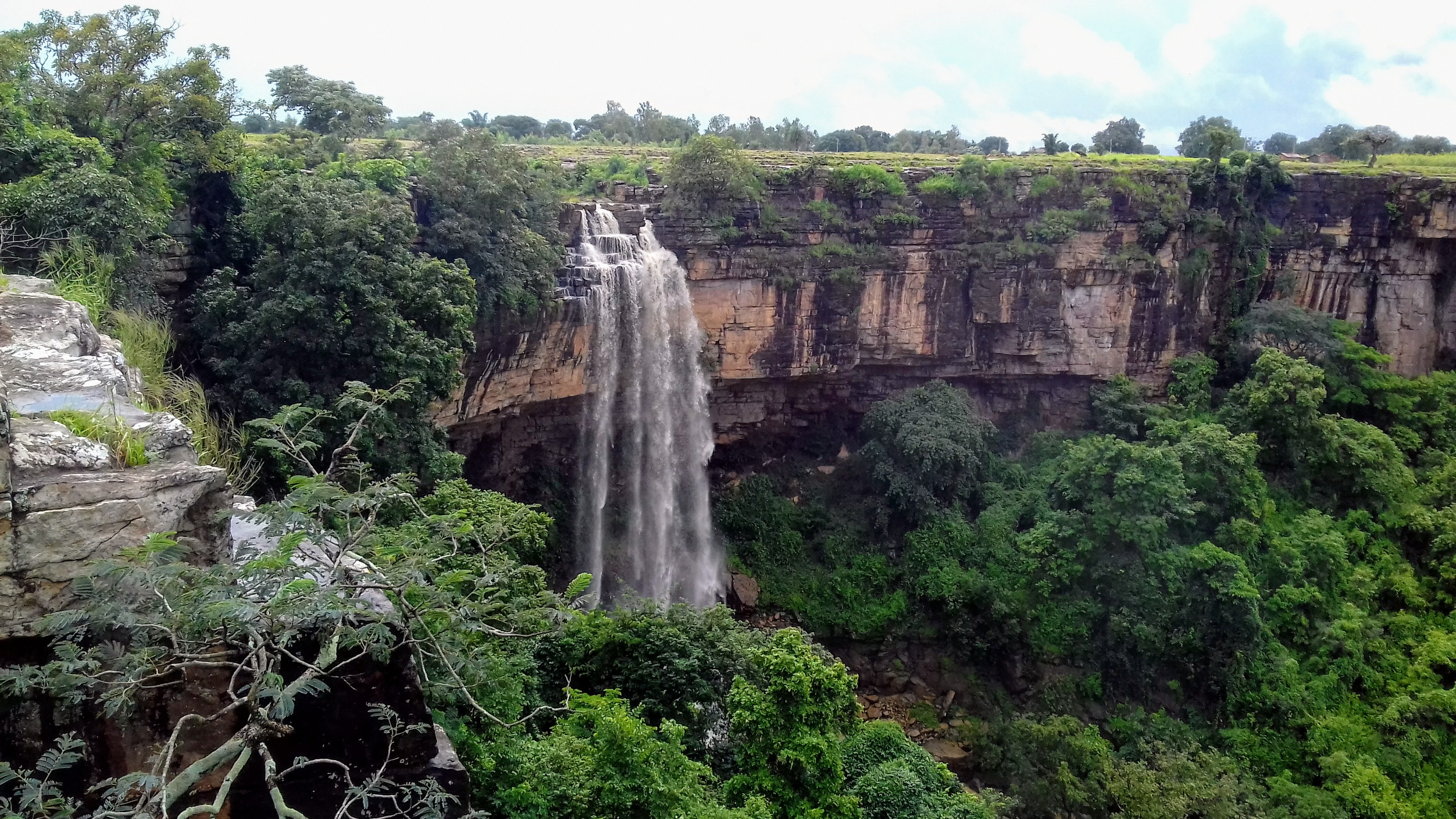
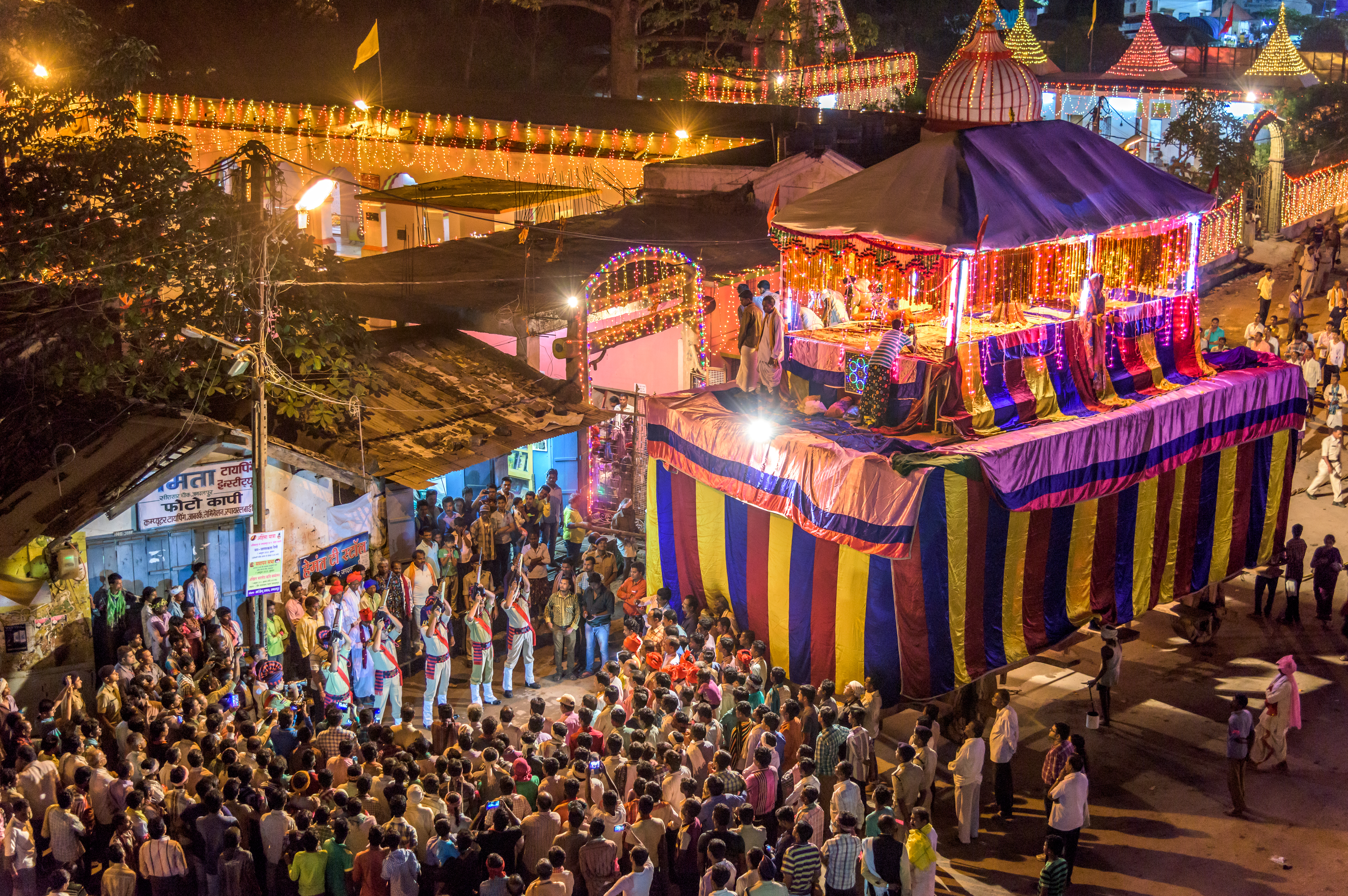
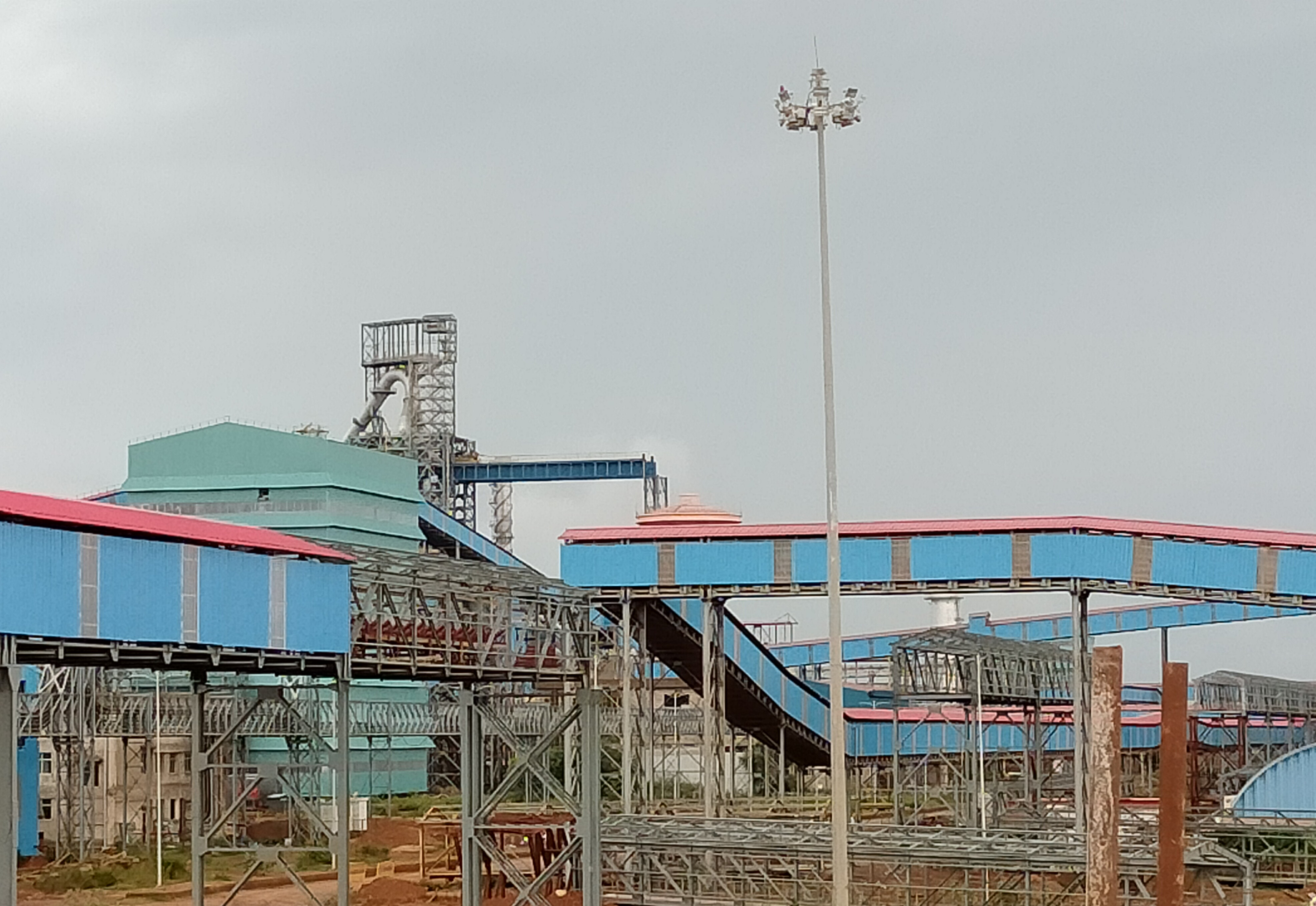
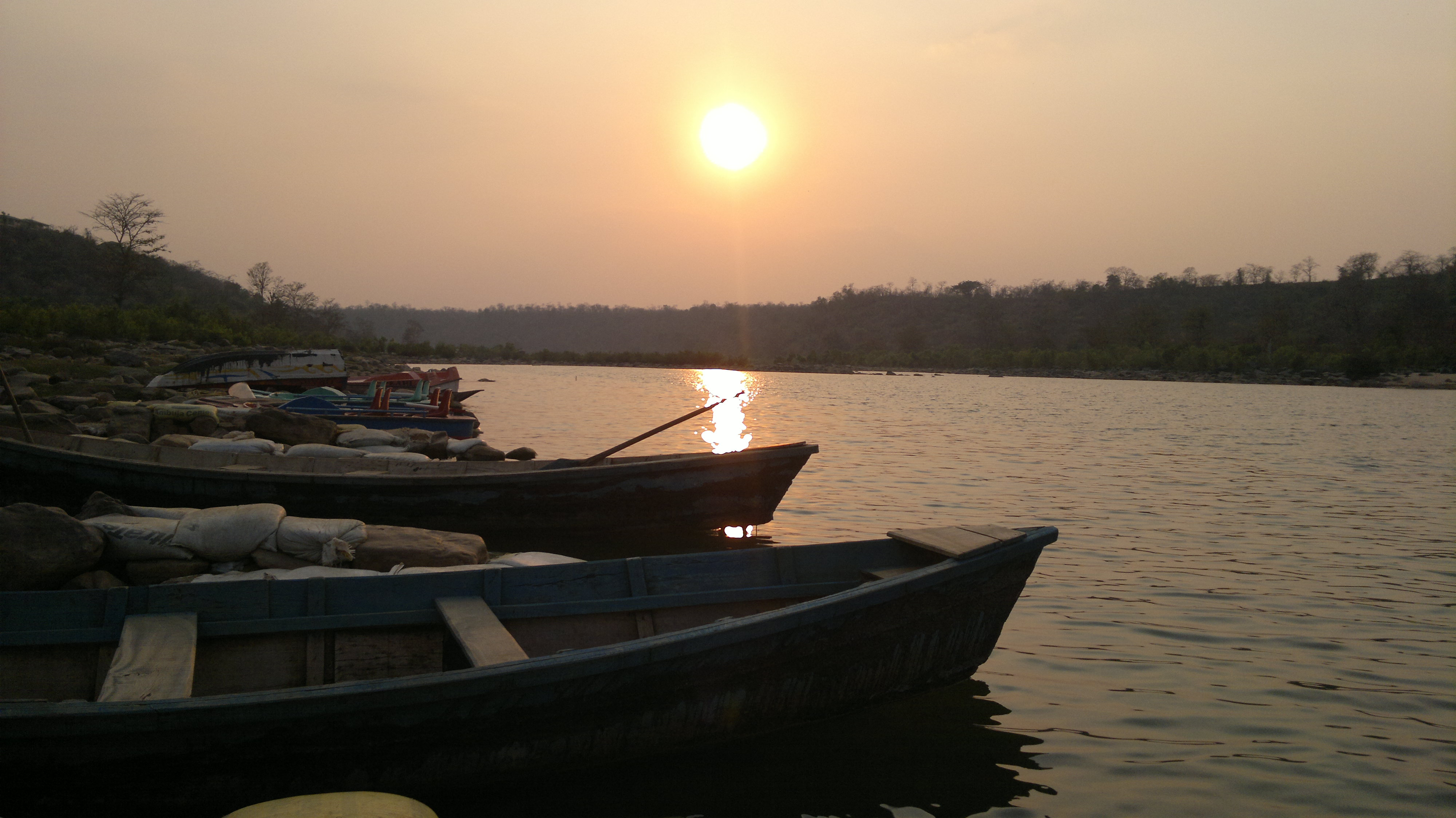
- From top: "Left to right" Chitrakote Falls, Kanger Ghati National Park, Tamda Ghumar waterfalls, Teerathgarh Falls, Jagdalpur-Raipur highway, Dokra tribe metal craft,Shiv linga in Kotumsar Cave, Danteswari Shakti Peeth, Mendri Ghumar waterfalls, Bastar Dussehra, Amcho Bastar Sign, NMDC Steel, Sunset at Chitrakote Falls
- Nicknames: Gateway to Bastar, Mumbai of Chhattisgarh, City of Crossroads
- Location within Chhattisgarh Location within India
- Coordinates: 19.18°N 81.92°E
- Country: India
- State: Chhattisgarh
- Division: Bastar Division
- District: Bastar District

Government
  - Body: Jagdalpur Nagar Nigam
  - Mayor: Sanjay Pandey, (BJP)
  - Collector: Mr. Aakash Chhikara (IAS)

Area
  - Metro: 193 km^{2} (75 sq mi)
  - Rank: 3rd(in chhattisgarh)
- Elevation: 552 m (1,811 ft)

Population (2011)
  - Metro: 325,463
  - Rank: 4th in Chhattisgarh & 155th in India
  - Density: 1,690/km^{2} (4,370/sq mi)
  - Metro: 567,478

Languages
  - Official: Hindi, Halbi
  - Regional: Halbi, Bhatri, Gondi
- Time zone: UTC+5:30 (IST)
- PIN: 494001, 494005 (Dharampura)
- Telephone code: 07782-xxxxxx
- Vehicle registration: CG-17
- Website: www.bastar.gov.in

Jagdalpur is a city located in the southern part of Chhattisgarh state in India. It is the administrative headquarters of the Bastar district and Bastar division. Before the independence of India, it also served as the capital of the erstwhile princely state of Bastar. It is the fourth largest city of Chhattisgarh.

Bastar district has multiple scenic waterfalls that are popular for tourists throughout India. The Ministry of Tourism, Government of India has identified Jagdalpur-Teerathgarh-Chitrakoot-Barsur-Dantewada Circuit as one of the 45 Mega Tourist Destinations/Circuits in India on the basis of footfalls and their future tourism potential.

== Transport ==
=== Road transport ===
The road network in and around Jagdalpur can be seen from the road network map of the area.

The National Highways passing through Jagdalpur are NH 30 (connecting Raipur to Vijaywada in Andhra Pradesh via NH 65), and NH 63 (connecting Jagdalpur to Nizamabad in Telangana) while passing through Maharashtra.

NH 30 at Raipur connects Jagdalpur to Asian Highway 46 leading to Nagpur and Kolkata. NH 30 near Vijayawada connects Jagdalpur to NH 65 leading to Hyderabad and Pune.

=== Rail transport ===
Jagdalpur is connected by rail to the eastern part of India. There are trains connecting Jagdalpur railway station to Howrah, Bhubaneshwar and Visakhapatnam. The rail connectivity of Jagdalpur to Durg via Rayagada and Raipur is about 658 km long and takes 14.5 hours of travel time as compared to that by road which takes about 6–7 hours (distance 300 km).

=== Recent Developments and Status (2025–2026) ===
In May 2025, the Ministry of Railways officially sanctioned the construction of the Rowghat–Jagdalpur section (140 km) at a revised cost of ₹3,513.11 crore. This project is now being fully funded by the Central Government to expedite connectivity in the Bastar division.

As of 2026, groundwork for the project, including site demarcation and forest clearance in the Kondagaon and Narayanpur districts, has been accelerated with a target to commence major construction before the monsoon. The Union Government significantly increased the rail infrastructure outlay for Chhattisgarh to ₹6,925 crore for the 2025–26 fiscal year, part of which is dedicated to the Dallirajhara–Rowghat–Jagdalpur corridor.

Once completed, this line will provide a direct rail link between Jagdalpur and Raipur, integrating the region with the Mumbai–Howrah main line and facilitating the transport of iron ore from the Rowghat mines to the Nagarnar Steel Plant.

=== Air transport ===
Maa Danteshwari Airport has started daily flight services between Jagdalpur, Raipur, Hyderabad by Alliance Air under the Regional Connectivity Scheme (RCS) – UDAN (Ude Desh Ka Aam Nagrik) of Government of India. Jagdalpur Airport is spread over an area of 132 acres. IndiGo operates flights to Raipur and Hyderabad. Currently it is connected with Delhi via Jabalpur by Alliance Air.

== Climate ==
Jagdalpur has a tropical savanna climate (Köppen climate classification Aw) with three main seasons: summer, monsoon, and winter. Summers last from March to May and are hot, with the average maximum for May reaching 38.1 °C (100.6 °F). The weather cools off somewhat for the monsoon season from June to September, which features very heavy rainfall. Winters are warm and dry.

Climate data for Jagdalpur (1991–2020, extremes 1909–2020)
Month	Jan	Feb	Mar	Apr	May	Jun	Jul	Aug	Sep	Oct	Nov	Dec	Year
Record high °C (°F)	34.8 (94.6)	38.7 (101.7)	40.6 (105.1)	43.3 (109.9)	46.1 (115.0)	45.5 (113.9)	38.9 (102.0)	39.8 (103.6)	34.2 (93.6)	36.1 (97.0)	34.1 (93.4)	32.8 (91.0)	46.1 (115.0)
Mean daily maximum °C (°F)	28.8 (83.8)	31.6 (88.9)	35.2 (95.4)	37.2 (99.0)	37.9 (100.2)	33.3 (91.9)	29.2 (84.6)	28.7 (83.7)	30.2 (86.4)	30.8 (87.4)	29.7 (85.5)	28.5 (83.3)	31.7 (89.1)
Daily mean °C (°F)	20.3 (68.5)	23.1 (73.6)	27.1 (80.8)	29.7 (85.5)	31.0 (87.8)	28.4 (83.1)	25.9 (78.6)	25.5 (77.9)	26.3 (79.3)	25.4 (77.7)	22.7 (72.9)	19.8 (67.6)	25.4 (77.8)
Mean daily minimum °C (°F)	11.8 (53.2)	14.7 (58.5)	18.8 (65.8)	22.4 (72.3)	24.2 (75.6)	23.9 (75.0)	22.8 (73.0)	22.5 (72.5)	22.4 (72.3)	20.1 (68.2)	15.6 (60.1)	11.3 (52.3)	19.2 (66.6)
Record low °C (°F)	2.8 (37.0)	5.0 (41.0)	8.5 (47.3)	13.9 (57.0)	17.2 (63.0)	14.5 (58.1)	18.3 (64.9)	16.7 (62.1)	17.6 (63.7)	11.1 (52.0)	5.6 (42.1)	3.9 (39.0)	2.8 (37.0)
Average rainfall mm (inches)	10.7 (0.42)	6.8 (0.27)	18.8 (0.74)	54.4 (2.14)	79.4 (3.13)	234.9 (9.25)	369.1 (14.53)	366.8 (14.44)	246.4 (9.70)	93.5 (3.68)	22.4 (0.88)	4.7 (0.19)	1,508 (59.37)
Average rainy days	0.9	0.6	1.4	3.7	5.3	10.1	17.4	18.2	11.7	4.9	1.3	0.5	75.9
Average relative humidity (%) (at 17:30 IST)	48	39	34	38	45	67	82	83	79	70	62	55	58
Source 1: India Meteorological Department
Source 2: Tokyo Climate Center (mean temperatures 1991–2020)

== Demographics ==
Religions in Jagdalpur (2011)
Religion	Percent
Hindus	81.80%
Christians	9.44%
Muslims	5.32%
Jains	1.81%
Sikhs	1.27%
Other or not stated	0.36%

As of the year 2021, town has a population of 325,463. The Municipal Corporation have a sex ratio of 985 females per 1,000 males and 19.0% of the population were under six years old. Effective literacy was 90.44%; male literacy was 92.51% and female literacy was 88.37%.

At the time of the 2011 census, 81.80% of the population were Hindus, 9.44% Christians, 5.32% Muslims, 1.81% Jains, 1.27% Sikhs.

Hindi is the largest language, spoken by 54% of the population. Chhattisgarhi, Halbi, Bhatri and Gondi languages/dialects are also widely spoken. Odia and it's dialect Bhatri is spoken in the district and in parts near to Odisha with heavy influence of Halbi.

== Industry and economy ==
Jagdalpur has a primarily agrarian economy. It is the second biggest market after Raipur in the state. Furniture and rice mills are the largest industry. Nagarnar Steel Plant, set up at its outskirts, was completed in October 2018.

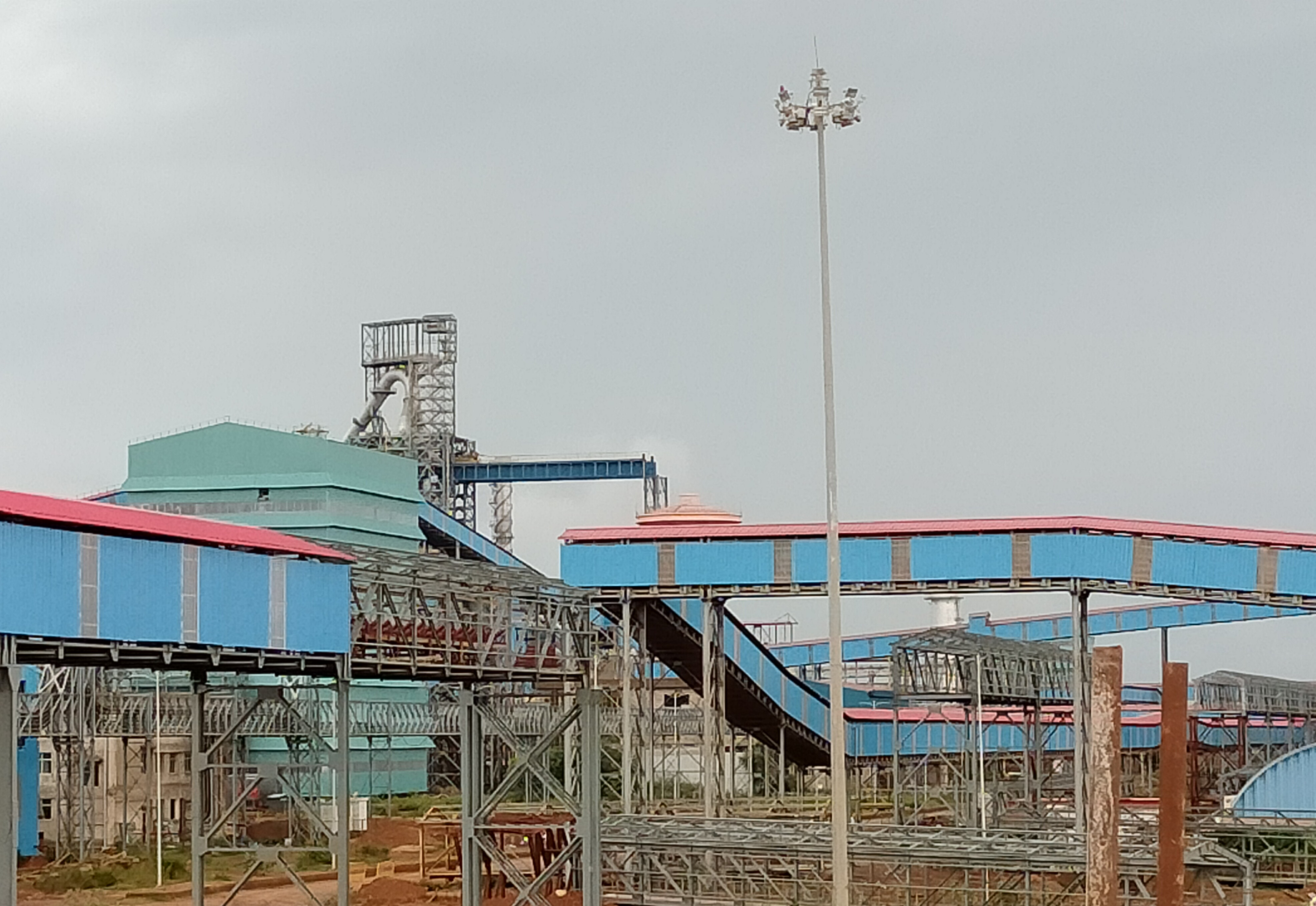
NMDC Steel Plant

National Mineral Development Corporation (NMDC) built a steel plant in Nagarnar, located 16 km from Jagdalpur in Chhattisgarh state with an outlay of Rs 20000 crore.

== Notable sites ==
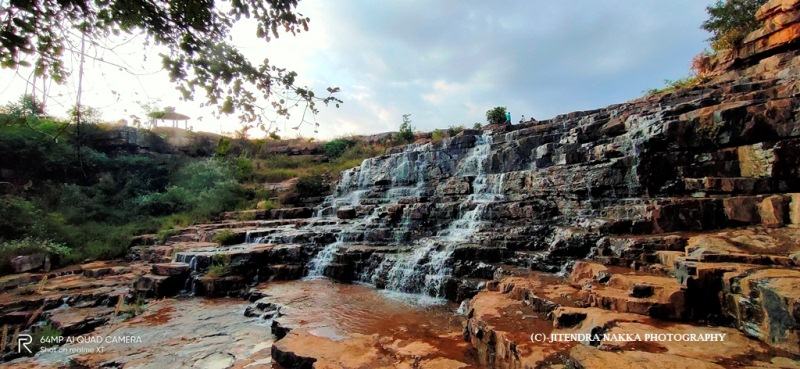
Mandawa WF, Bastar, CG

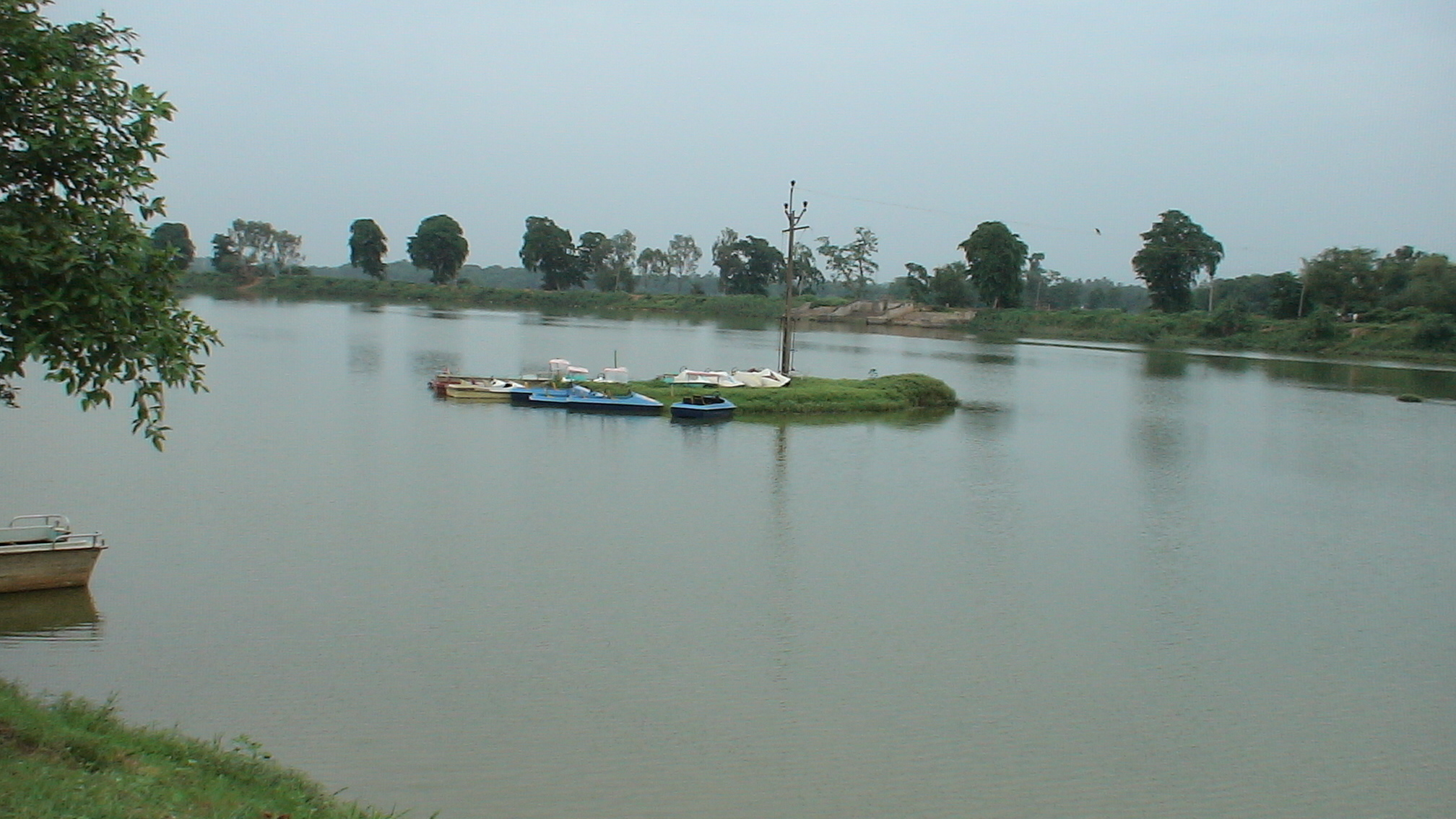
The Indravati River

Important landmarks in Jagdalpur include Chitrakote Falls, Teerathgarh Falls, Kotumsar Cave, Tamda Ghumar waterfalls, Mendri Ghumar waterfalls, Kanger Ghati National Park, Indravati National Park, Danteshwari Temple, the historic temples in Barsoor, Jagannath temple, Mavli temple, Laxmi-Narayan temple, and the Sri Venkateshwara Swamy Temple.

== See also ==
- Chitrakote Falls
- Danteshwari Temple
- Indravati National Park
- Kanger Ghati National Park
- Kotumsar Cave
- Mendri Ghumar
- Tamda Ghumar
- Teerathgarh Falls
- Tokapal
