= Chitrakote Falls =

Waterfall in Chhattisgarh, India

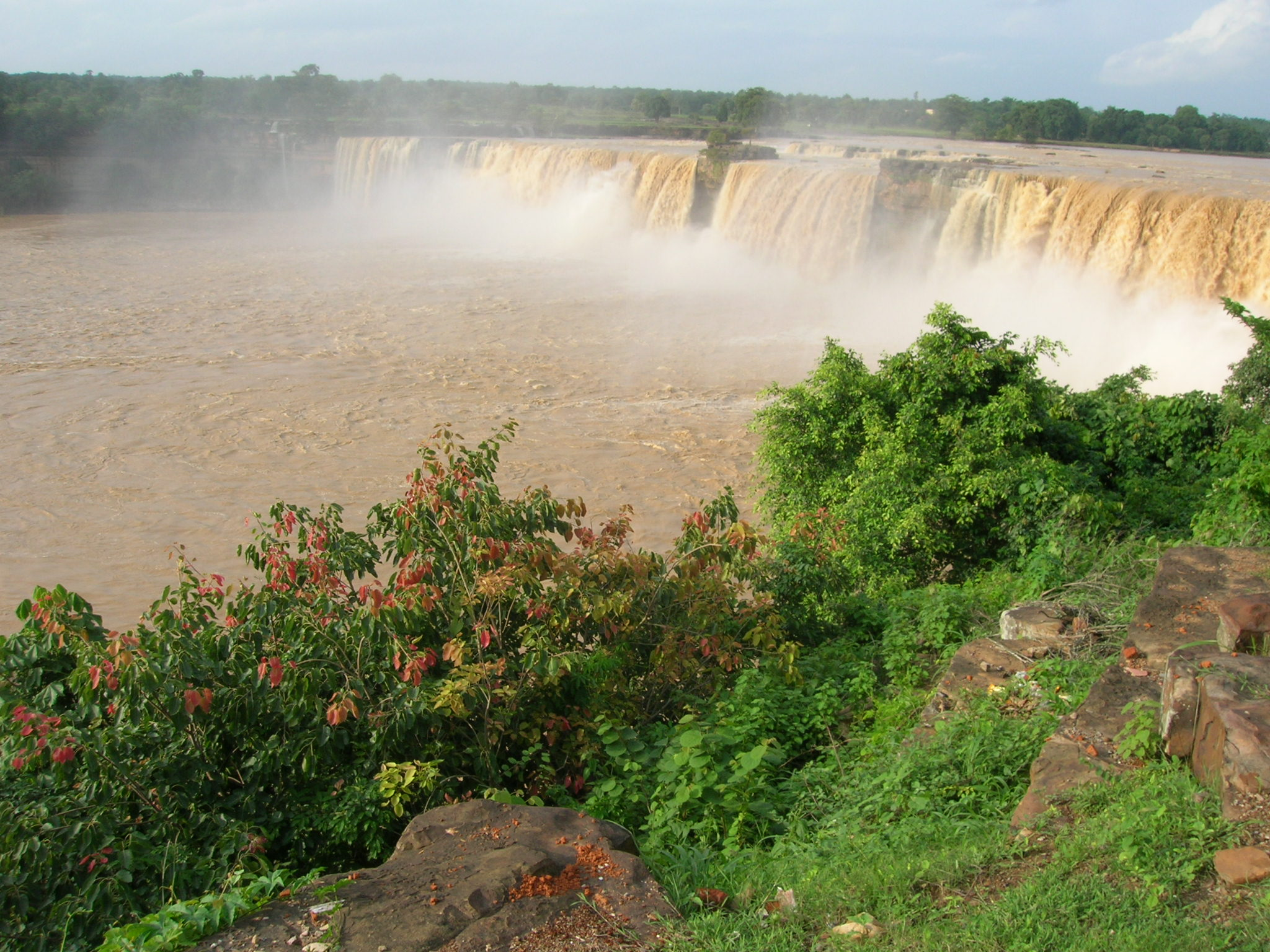
- Chitrakote Falls

- Location within Chhattisgarh
- Location: Bastar, Chhattisgarh, India
- Coordinates: 19°12′23″N 81°42′00″E
- Type: Cataract
- Total height: 29 metres (95 ft)
- Number of drops: 3
- Watercourse: Indravati River

The Chitrakote Falls (also spelled Chitrakote, Chitrakot, and Chitrakoot) is a natural waterfall on the Indravati River, located approximately 38 kilometres (24 mi) to the west of Jagdalpur, in Bastar district in the Indian state of Chhattisgarh.

The height of the falls is about 29 metres (95 ft). It is the widest waterfall in India, reaching a width of nearly 300 metres (980 ft) during the peak monsoon season. Because of its width and horseshoe shape during the monsoon season, it is often called the "Niagara Falls of India".

== Topography ==
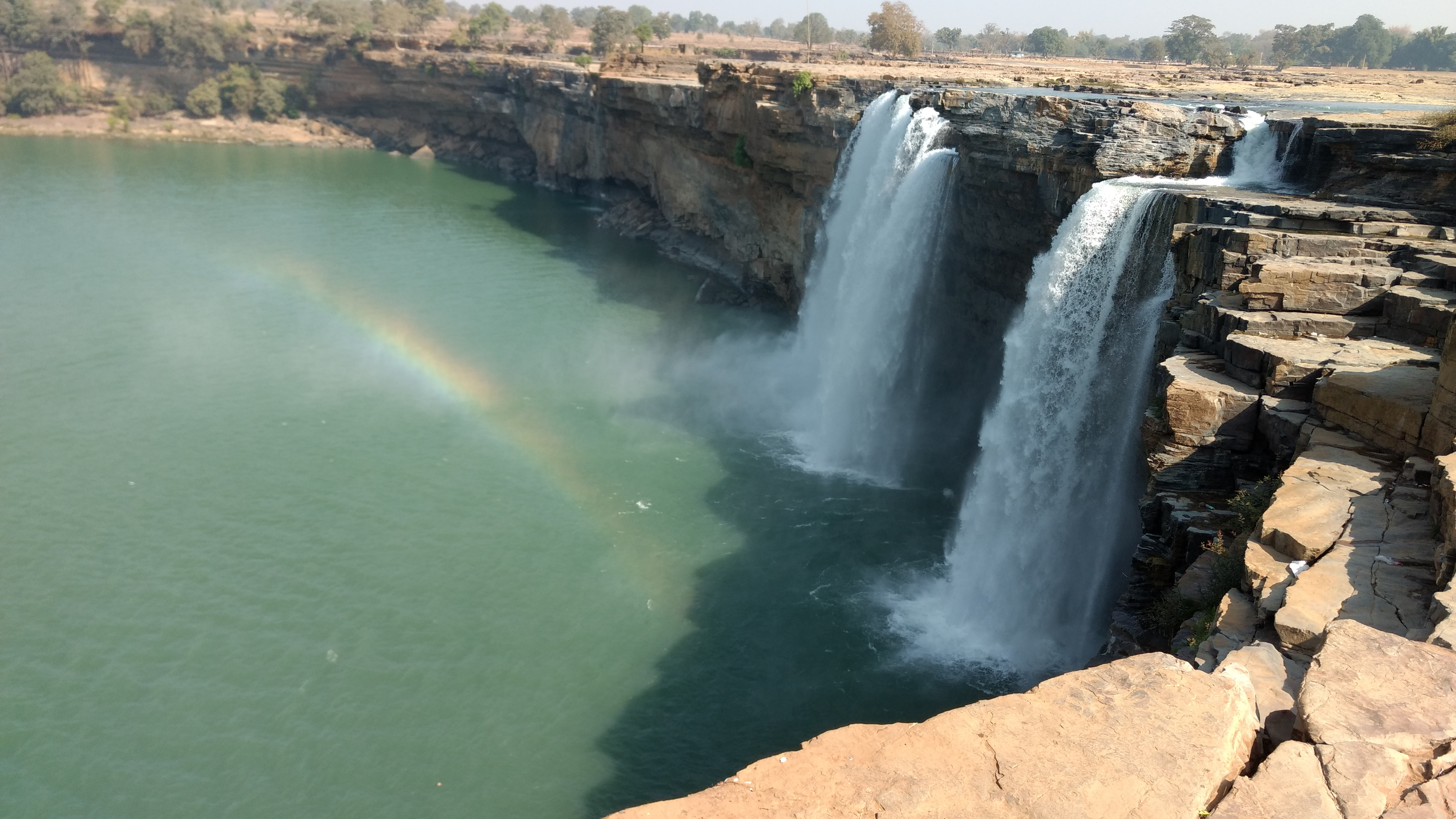
Chitrakote Falls in January 2017

The Chitrakote Falls is located on the Indravati River. The river originates in the Kalahandi district of Odisha, in the Vindhya Range of hills, flows westward, and then forms a fall at Chitrakote, after which it finally flows into the Godavari River at Bhadrakali, after traversing 240 miles (390 km) in the state. The free drop of the falls is a sheer height of about 30 metres (98 ft). Because of its horseshoe shape, it is often compared with the world-famous Niagara Falls in the United States, and is given the sobriquet "the Small Niagara Falls." During the rainy season, from July to October, rainbows can be seen as sunlight reflects off the mist rising from the waterfall.

A small Hindu shrine dedicated to the god Shiva and several naturally created grottoes named "Parvati caves" (named after Shiva's wife Parvati) are located on the left bank of the Chitrakote Falls. The river flows sluggishly upstream of the falls due to its meandering nature as it drains through the plains of Jagdalpur. This stretch of the river valley has very little forest cover. Below the falls the river traverses the Bodhghat forested area and the river regime undergoes a drastic change in its flow conditions. Aeration processes and the forest in the downstream area filter the silt in the river. The weather in the area is generally pleasant except in the summer season when it is hot due to the absence of shade amid lack of vegetation in the area.

Chitrakote Falls is one of two waterfalls located near the Kanger Valley National Park, the other being Teerathgarh Falls.

== Geology ==
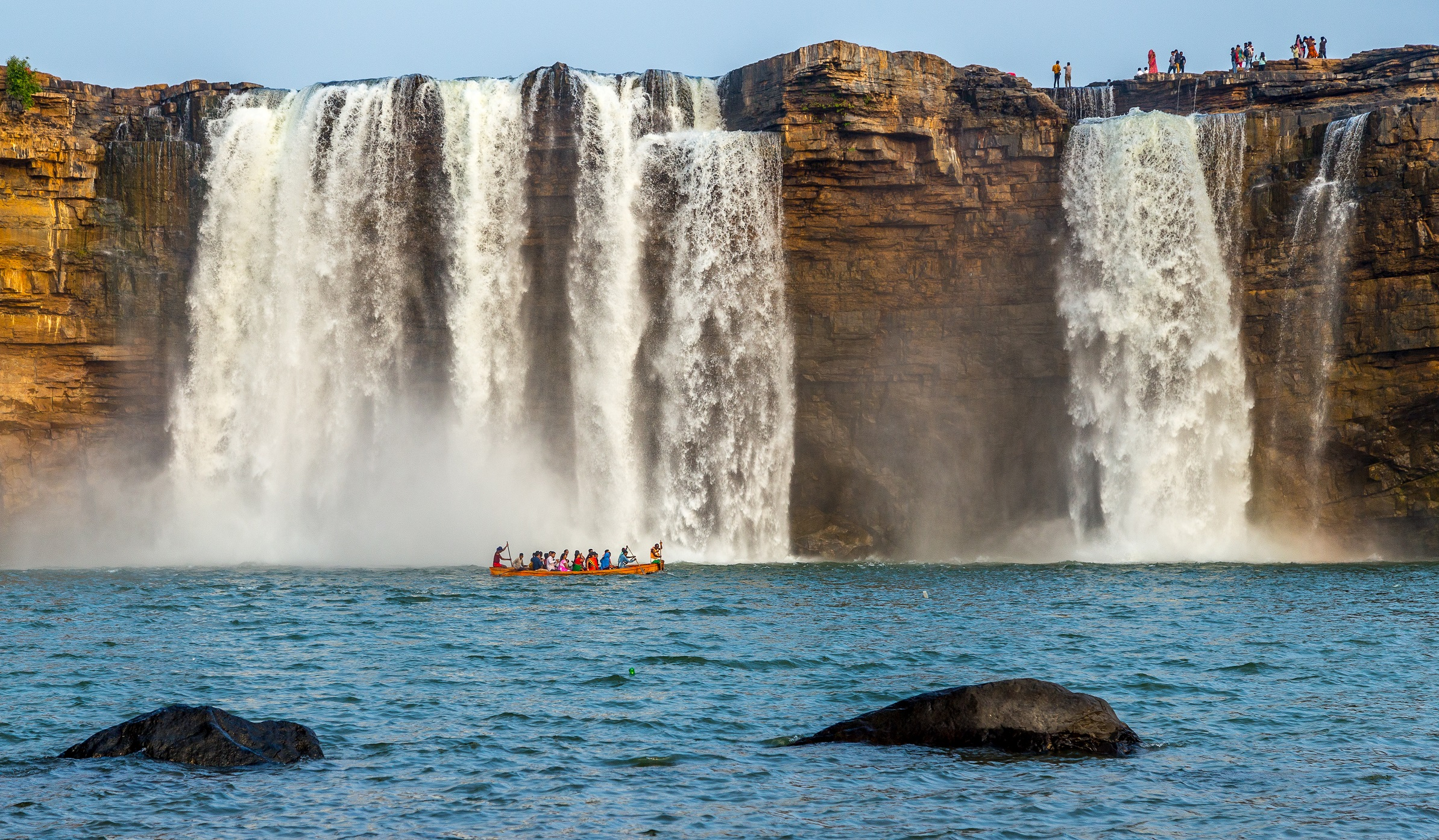
Chitrakote Falls

The geological formation of the Indravati River valley as it rises and flows downstream consists of quartzitic sandstone and changes to the Archaean granite and gneisses near the Chitrakote Falls. It is one of the six waterfalls in India classified as geomorphosites (geoheritage sites with geomorphological interest); this classification is based on research studies of geological features of heritage value existing in different parts of the country. These have been studied and discussed in seminars by geologists, and studies have received the support of international institutions such as the United Nations Educational, Scientific and Cultural Organization (UNESCO), the International Union for Conservation of Nature (IUCN), the International Union of Geological Sciences (IUGS), and the International Association of Geomorphologists (IAG).

== Features ==
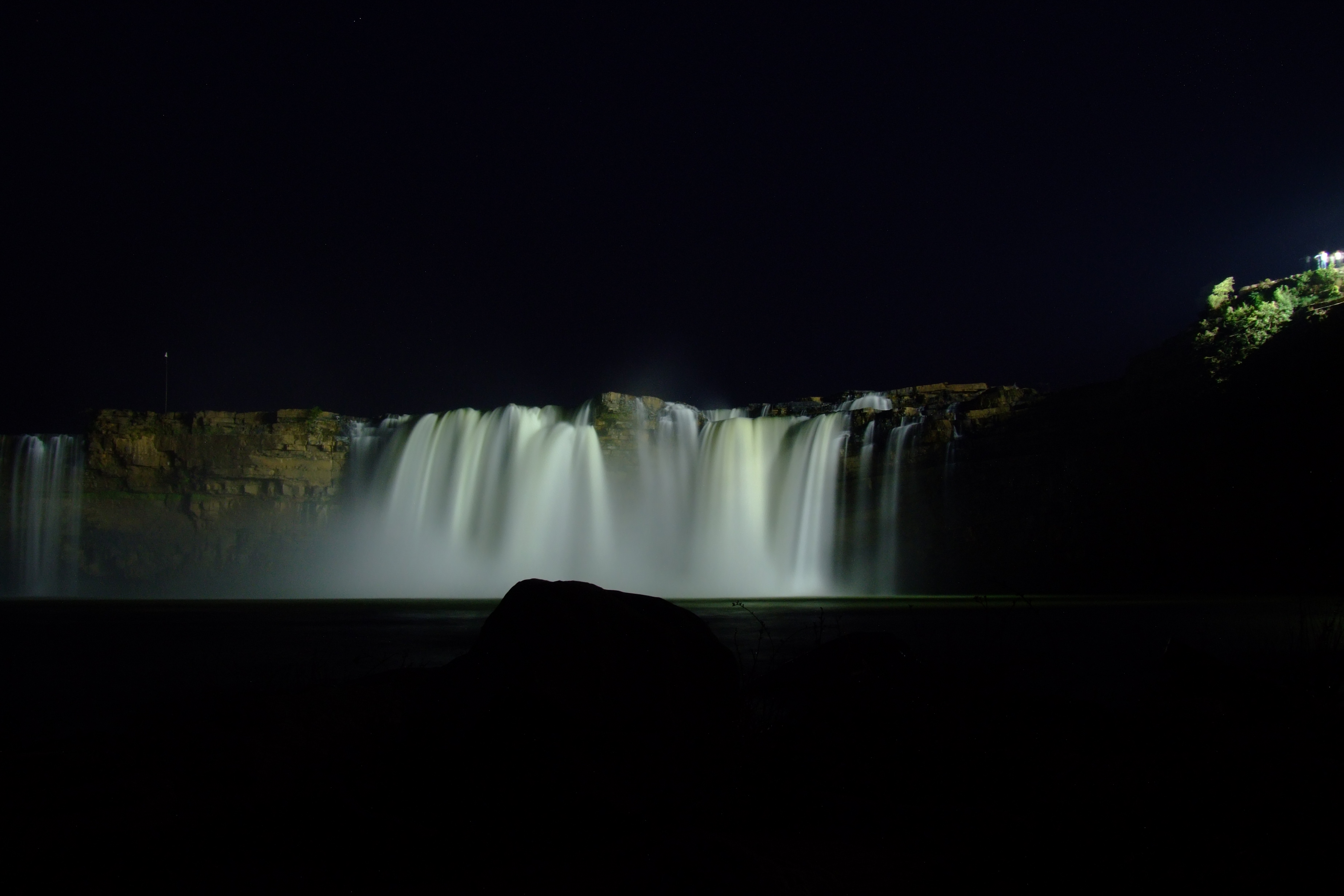
Chitrakote waterfall at night

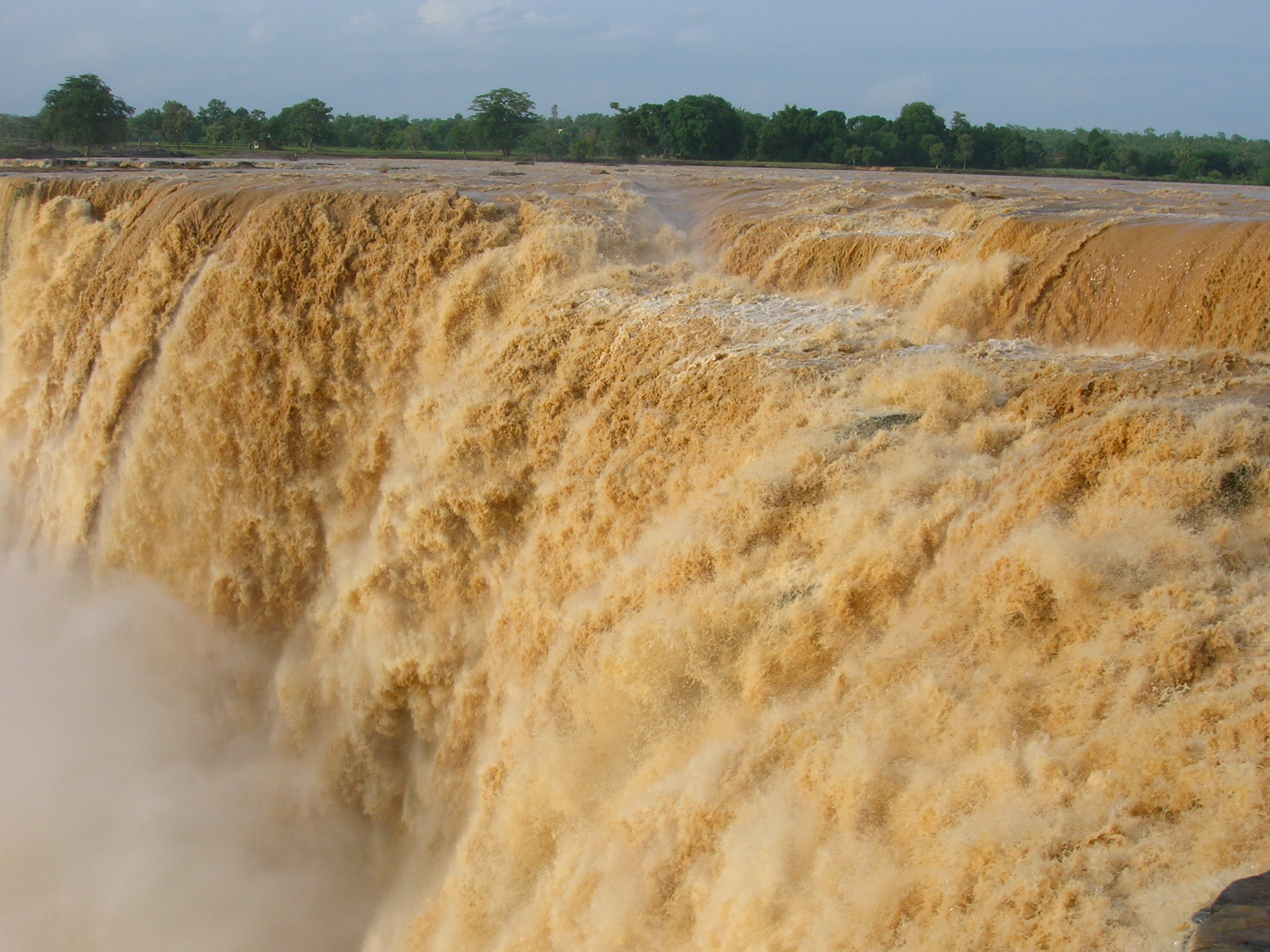
Muddy flow

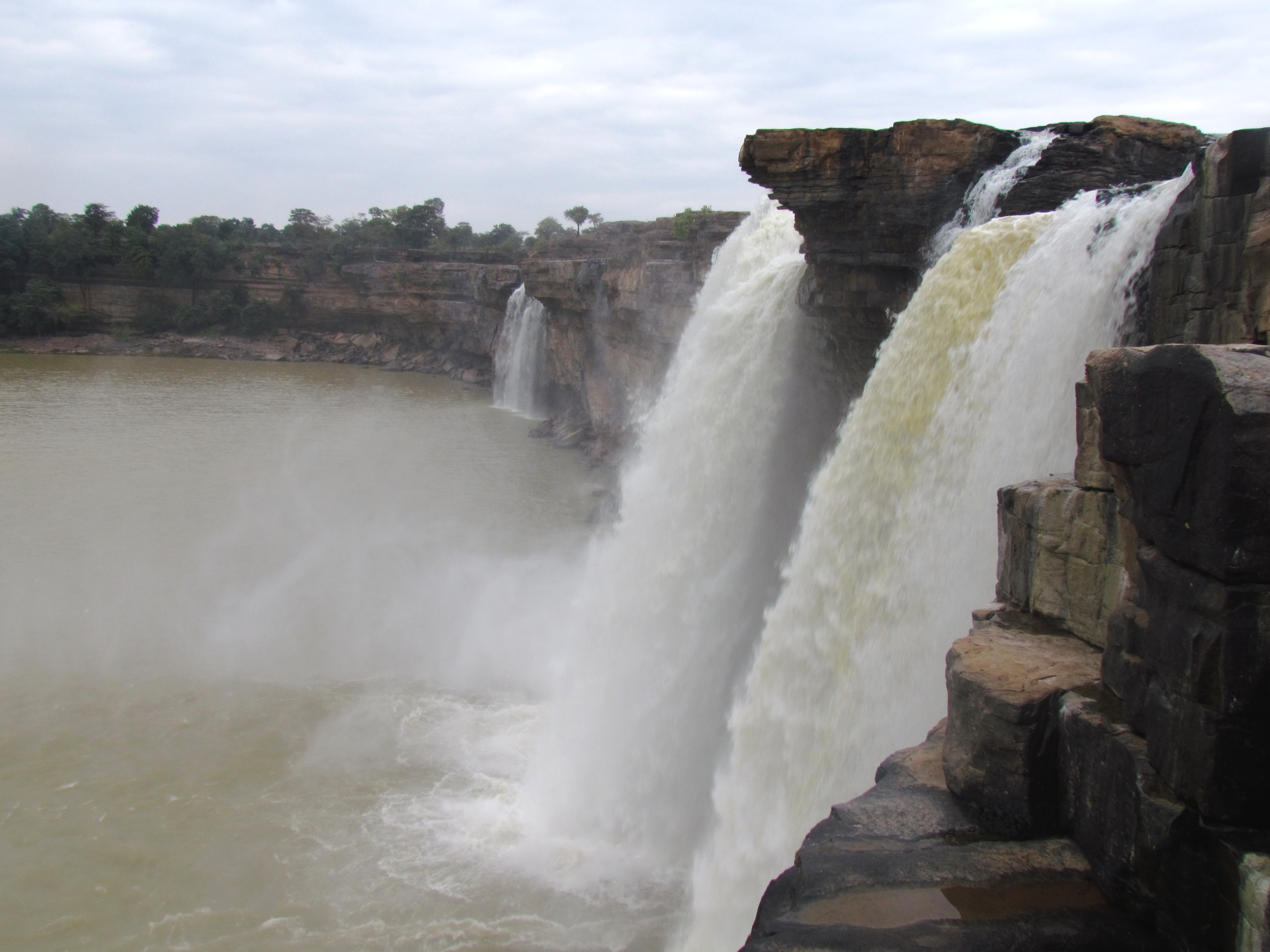
Another view of Chitrakote Falls during low-flow season

The Chitrakote Falls, which spreads over three braids during the low-flow season, is a single sheet of flow over a free fall of about 30 metres (98 ft), forming a horseshoe-shaped gorge. However, during the monsoon season, when the Indravati River is in flood, the falls cover the entire stretch of the horseshoe from the left to the right bank, a width of about 300 metres (980 ft). Though it is about one-third less in width compared to Niagara Falls, its visual splendour has been described as equally impressive. Water flow conditions over the falls vary with the seasons. During the flood season or the monsoon season, the flow is filled with silt. It is India's widest waterfall.

Local boat facilities operating below and under the falls in a misty atmosphere provide views of the falls under an early morning sun in reflected sunlight and in a blue hue. On the banks of the pond below the falls, many small Shiva Lingas (aniconic symbols of the god Shiva) are found in several niches, as are iron trishuls (the trident weapon of Shiva), mostly in a rusted state. On the left bank, there is a rock ledge and climbing down this cliff leads to a naturally formed niche which houses stone slabs carved with deities. In addition, there is a small hut made of straw where Shiva images and rusted images of his son, the god Ganesha, are seen. Many local people are involved in fishing in the area.

The beauty of the falls can be seen throughout the year, particularly during sunset. As the fast-flowing water of the river flows over the sharp, near-vertical rock exposure at the widest reach of the river, it generates misty clouds and then hits into a pond formed in a semicircular shape at the bottom of the falls. Adventure sports enthusiasts use boats in the stormy part of this pond. Pilgrims bathe in the calmer part of the lake. In the low-flow season, paddle boats are used in pools formed in the upstream part of the falls. In the pool below the falls, swimming and paddle boats are permitted. Local boatmen can paddle their boats under the spray below the falls.

Some terrorist activity by Maoists (anti-revisionist) has been reported in the area. In 2008, when then-President of India Pratibha Patil visited Chitrakote Falls, there was a violent attack on a police vehicle which was blown up.

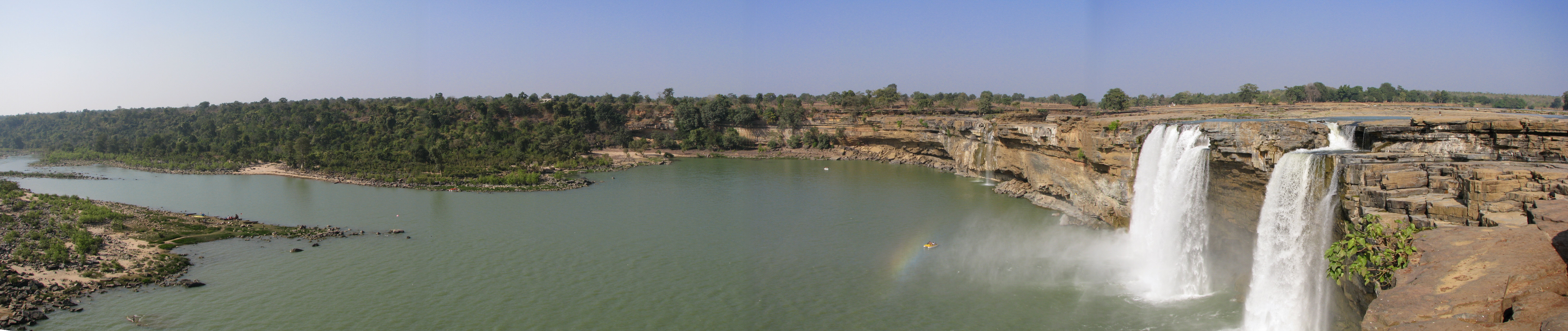
Panoramic view of downstream pond below the Chitrakote Falls

=== Recent Infrastructure and Tourism (2025–2026) ===
In late 2025, the Chhattisgarh Tourism Board launched a major project to enhance night tourism at Chitrakote Falls. This included the installation of high-intensity LED floodlights that illuminate the waterfall in multiple colors after sunset, allowing visitors to view the falls during the night.

As of April 2026, under the state's urban and tourism infrastructure boost, new safety barriers and designated viewing decks have been constructed to manage the increasing influx of tourists. The district administration has also completed the widening of the 38 km approach road from Jagdalpur to improve connectivity. Additionally, "Tourism on Wheels" and eco-adventure activities have been introduced near the falls to promote sustainable ecotourism in the Bastar region.

== Conservation ==
The Ministry of Tourism and Development of the Government of India assessed the potential of this site in 2003 as being of a natural "ambiance" suitable for the development of ecotourism. Based on this assessment, plans were drawn up to develop facilities such as local restaurants, nature camping sites, a playground for children, and platforms from which to view the falls, and also to improve the road conditions, fix signs along the road from Jagdalpur to the falls, and generally beautify the site. Environmental conditions in the vicinity of the falls are in a largely preserved state but need attention as ecotourism develops.

As of 2010, some infrastructure facilities had improved. There is a government-run hotel at the top of the falls. A series of steps from the garden of the hotel leads to the falls. "Chitrakote log huts" with basic and modern cabins have also been built at the location. Some of the cabins provide good views of the falls. The falls dried up during the summer, from April to June, because water of the Indravati River has been diverted through Jaura Nallah near the Odisha–Chhattisgarh border by the Odisha government. It also includes indiscriminate construction of check dams near the falls. Social activists and environmentalists are making efforts to restore its charms. At present the falls flows only during the rain.

Apart from many large hydroelectric power plants on the Indravati River, a small power plant of 7.5 MW capacity has been planned to utilize the head at the Chitrakote Falls, though no irrigation is envisaged.

== See also ==
- List of waterfalls
- List of waterfalls in India
- List of waterfalls in India by height
- Kanger Ghati National Park
- Tamda Ghumar
- Teerathgarh Falls
- Kotumsar Cave
- Mendri Ghumar
- Jagdalpur

== Bibliography ==
- Board, Pratiyogita Darpan Editorial. Pratiyogita Darpan Extra Issue Series-2 General Studies Geography (India & World). Upkar Prakashan.
- Chatterjee, Ramananda (1955). The Modern Review. Prabasi Press Private, Limited.
- Choudhary, Subharanshu (1 December 2012). Let's call him Vasu: With the Maoists in Chhattisgarh. Penguin Books Limited. ISBN 978-81-8475-737-8.
- Kale, Piotr Vishwas S. (1 January 2014). Landscapes and Landforms of India. Springer. ISBN 978-94-017-8029-2.
- Kaul, Ranjan (12 March 2012). Through the Forest Darkly. Hachette India. ISBN 978-93-5009-364-1.
- House, Travel (2004). Travel House Guide to Incredible India. Travel House. ISBN 978-81-241-1063-8.
- Menon, Gangadharan (11 December 2014). Evergreen Leaves: Recollections of My Journeys into Wild India. PartridgeIndia. ISBN 978-1-4828-4170-1.
- Sharma, Arun Kumar (2000). Archaeo-anthropology of Chhattīsgaṛh. Sundeep Prakashan. ISBN 9788175740969.
- Sharma, Brahm Dev (1995). Globalisation, the tribal encounter. Har-Anand Publications. ISBN 9788124103357.
- Singh, Sarina (15 September 2010). Lonely Planet India. Lonely Planet. ISBN 978-1-74220-347-8.
- Terryn, Waylon Christian (27 July 2011). Chitrakoot Falls. Fer Publishing. ISBN 978-613-7-04909-9.
