= Indravati National Park =

National park in Chhattisgarh, India

- Indravati Tiger Reserve
- IUCN category II (national park)
- Location within Chhattisgarh Location within India
- Interactive map of Indravati National Park
- Location: Bijapur district, Chhattisgarh, India
- Nearest city: Jagdalpur
- Coordinates: 19°12′18″N 81°1′53″E
- Area: 1,258.37 km^{2} (485.86 sq mi)
- Established: 1981 (National Park); 1983 (Tiger Reserve)
- Governing body: Conservator of Forest (Field Director)

Indravati National Park is a national park located in Bijapur district of Chhattisgarh state in India. The park derives its name from the Indravati River, which flows from east to west and forms the northern boundary of the reserve with the Indian state of Maharashtra.

Indravati National Park is among the most famous wildlife parks of Chhattisgarh. It is one of four Project Tiger sites in Chhattisgarh, along with Udanti-sitanadi, and is home to one of the last remaining populations of the endangered wild water buffalo. With a total area of approximately 2799.08 km^{2}, Indravati attained the status of a national park in 1981 and a tiger reserve in 1983, becoming one of the most famous tiger reserves in India.

As of 2022, the park is reported to be largely under Naxal control.

== Topography ==
The topography of the park mainly comprises undulating hilly terrain with altitude ranging between 177 and 599 metres above the sea level.

== Flora ==
The vegetation of the Indravati National Park is mainly of the tropical moist and dry deciduous type with predominance of bamboo, Sarai and teak. There are also patches of grassland providing food to large herbivores such as wild water buffalos, chital, barking deer, nilgai, and gaurs. The most common tree in the park are teak, lendia, salai, mahua, tendu, semal, haldu, Boir and Jam.

== Wildlife ==
Indravati National Park has one of the last populations of the wild water buffalo. It is also home to the Asian elephant, gaur, nilgai, blackbuck, chausingha, sambar, chital, Indian muntjac, Indian spotted chevrotain and wild boar. Large predators are represented by the tiger, leopard, sloth bear and dhole, and smaller mammals include flying squirrels, porcupines, pangolins, Rhesus macaque and langurs.
