= List of national highways in India by state =

List of the new national highway numbers (state-wise).

== Andhra Pradesh ==
There are 55 national highways including one national expressway (NE7) in Andhra Pradesh with a total length of 8683.15 km as of 31 Dec 2022. These are administered by NHAI agencies or the state R&B department. Apart from these, Narketpally–Addanki–Medarametla Road, which began its life as state highway, is now a national highway, following the bifurcation of united Andhra Pradesh into Andhra Pradesh and Telangana in 2014. It is administered by the states of Andhra Pradesh and Telangana for their respective segments.

Number	Length (km)	Length (mi)	Southern or western terminus	Northern or eastern terminus	Formed	Removed	Notes
NH 16	1024.1	636.3	Orissa- Ichapuram - Palasa - Narasannapeta - Srikakulam - Ranastalam -Anandapuram Pendurthi, Anakapalli, Rajahmundary, Deverapalli, Gondugolanu, Vijayawada, Guntur, Nellore-Tamil Nadu Border // Anandapuramu-Visakhapatnam-Anakapalli		—	—	
NH 26	90.3	56.1	Odisha Border, Salur, Vizianagaram - junction with NH-16 near Thagarapuvalasa (Visakhapatnam)		—	—	
NH 30	134.8	83.8	Chhattisgarh Border-Nellipaka, Bhadrachalam, Paloncha, Kottagudam, Tiravuru, Mailavaram-junction with NH-65 near Kondapalle (Vijayawada)		—	—	
NH 40	381.0	236.7	Junction with NH-44 near Kurnool -Nandyal, Cuddapah, Pileru, Putalapattu and Chittoor-Tamil Nadu Border		—	—	
NH 42	378.3	235.1	Junction with NH-67 - Urvakonda, Anantapur, Kadiri, Madanapalle, Kuppam-Tamil Nadu Border		—	—	
NH 44	261.0	162.2	Maharashtra Border-Adilabad, Nirmal, Ramayampet, Hyderabad, Kurnool, Gooty, Anantapur, Penukonda, Karnataka Border		—	—	
NH 65	150.1	93.3	Karnataka Border- Hyderabad, Vijayawada Vuyyuru, Pamarru - junction with NH-216 at Machllipatnam		—	—	
NH 67	404.6	251.4	Karnataka Border- Gooty, Tadapatri, Muddanru, Jammalamadugu, Proddatur, Mydukuru, Badvel, Atmakur, Nellore on NH-16- Krishnapatnam Port		—	—	
NH 69	63.0	39.1	Karnataka Border- Palmaner -junction with NH-40 near Chittoor		—	—	
NH 71	190.6	118.4	Madanpalle on NH-42-Pileru, Tirupati, Renigunta, Erpedu-junction with NH-16 near Nayudupeta		—	—	
NH 75	24.6	15.3	Karnataka Border- Venkatagirikota-Tamil Nadu Border		—	—	
NH 130CD	—	—	Raipur- Visakhapatnam		—	—	Link
NH 140	58.9	36.6	Junction with NH-40 near Putalpattu - junction with NH-71 near Tirupati		—	—	
NH 150A	9.2	5.7	Jewargi	Chamarajanagar	—	—	
NH 150C	—	—	Solapur – Kurnool – Chennai Economic Corridor (EC-17)		—	—	Link
NH 163G	405	252	Nagpur-Vijayawada		—	—	Link
NH 165	107.8	67.0	Junction with NH-65 near Pamarru -Mandavalli, Pallevada, Digamarru - junction with NH-216 near Narsapur		—	—	
NH 167	110.2	68.5	Haggari, Adoni, Yemmiganur, Mantralayam, Raichur, Mahbubnagar, Jadcherla Road		—	—	
NH 167A	107.0	66.5	junction with AP/Telangana border - Piduguralla, Narsaraopet, Chilakaluripet, Chirala on NH-216 -Vodarevu		—	—	
NH 167AD	—	—	Macherla - Dachepalli		—	—	Link
NH 167AG	—	—	Kondamodu - Perecherla(Guntur)		—	—	Link
NH 167B	195.0	121.2	Mydukuru, YSR District	Singarayakonda	—	—	
NH 167BG	104.4	64.9	The highway starting from its junction with new NH No. 167B at Seetharampuram connecting Udaygiri, Dathuluru and terminating at its junction with new NH No. 16 near Kavali in the State of Andhra Pradesh.		—	—	
NH 167K	164	102	Kalvakurti, Nagar kurnool district, TG - Jammalamadugu, YSR district, AP		—	—	
NH 216	391.3	243.1	Kathipudi, Gollaprolu, Pithapuram, Kakinada, Yanam, Mummidivaram, Amalapuram, Razole, Digamarru (Palakollu), Narsapuram, Pedana, Machilipatnam, Repalle, Cherukupalle, Bapatla, Chirala, Ongole		—	—	
NH 216A	120.7	75.0	Rajamahendravaram - Ravulapalem - Tanuku - Tadepalligudem - Eluru		—	—	
NH 216E	30	19	Amalapuram - Ravulapalem		—	—	Link
NH 216H	119.95	74.53	Pedana - Nuzveedu -Vissannapet - Lakshmipuram Road		—	—	Link
NH 326	13.6	8.5	Odisha Border- N.H-30 near Chinturu		—	—	
NH 326A	41.0	25.5	Odisha Border-Kotabommali-junction with NH-16 near Narasannapeta		—	—	
NH 340	60.2	37.4	Rayachoti on NH-40 -Chinnamandem, Gurrramkonda - junction with NH-42 near Kurabalakota		—	—	
NH 340B	56.2	34.9	NH40 near Somayajulapalli - Betamcherla - RS Rangapuram - Chinna Malkapuram -NH44 near Dhone		—	—	Link
NH 340C	131.4	81.6	Kurnool on NH No-40 - Nandikotkur - Atmakur - Dornala on NH No-765.		—	—	
NH 342	79.65	49.49	Junction with NH-42 near Mudigubba connecting Puttaparthi and Terminating at its Junction with NH-44 near Koduru in the State of Andhra Pradesh		—	—	Link Link2
NH 365BB	86.4	53.7	Telangana-Jeelugumilli, Buttaigudem, Kannapuram, Pattiseema, Tallapudi, -junction of NH-16 near Kovvur		—	—	
NH 365BG	70.587	43.861	Khammam in Telangana’s Khammam district - Devarapalle in Andhra Pradesh’s West Godavari district via Wyra, Kalluru, Tiruvuru, Sattupalli, Jangamreddy Gudem.		—	—	Link
NH 440	—	—	Rayachoti Vempalli, Yerraguntla and Proddutur, Chagalamarri		—	—	Link
NH 516B	—	—	Pendurthi near Visakhapatnam, Sringavarapukota, Bowdara		—	—	Link
NH 516C	12.7	7.9	The highway starting from its junction with NH-16 at Sabbavaram bypass connecting Amruthapuram, Narava, Sathivani palem, Gopalpatanam rural and terminating near Sheelanagar in the State of Andhra Pradesh.		—	—	Link
NH 516D	57.7	35.9	Junction with NH 16 near Deverapalli Bypass - Golladgudem, Gopalapuram, Jaganathapuram, Atchyutapuram, Koyyalgudem, Bayyanagudem, Seetampeta, Narasannapalem, Jangareddigudam, Vegavaram, Taduvai, Darbhagudem- Jeelugumilli near Andhra Pradesh/Telangana border.		—	—	
NH 516E	406.2	252.4	junction with NH No. 16 near Rajamundry - Bhupatiapalem Road (connecting SH-38 near Rampachodavaram), Koyyuru, Chintapalli, Lambasingi, Paderu, Aruku, Bowadara, Tadipudi - junction of NH-26 at Vizianagaram		—	—	
NH 516F	—	—	Kakinada - Annavaram		—	—	Link
NH 516W	—	—	Chillakuru Cross Road (Tirupati district), Turpu Kanupur, Naidupeta		—	—	Link
NH 544D	417.1	259.2	Anantapur on NH No-44-Tadipatr - Kolimigundla-Owk-Banaganapalli- Gajualapalli, Giddalur - Cumbum - Thokapalli - Vinukonda - Narasaraopet - Guntur on NH No-16		—	—	
NH 544DD	105.0	65.2	Junction with NH No. 44 near Anantapur -Rayadurg-Karnataka Border		—	—	
NH 544E	103.5	64.3	Junction with NH No. 44 near Kodikonda checkpost - Lepakshi, Hindupur, Madakasira, Rolla, Agali -Karnataka Border		—	—	
NH 544F	384	239	NH-44 near Maruru (Raptadu), Itukalapalli, Husenapuram (Tadipatri), Nagireddipalli, Nallagatla, Diddalur, Kagitaalagudem (Cumbum), Rayayaram, Nuzendla, Kommalapadu, Kavuru, Phirangipuram, medikonduru, Velavarthipadu, junction with Vijaywada Inner Ring road near Pedda parimi		—	—	Link
NH 544G	624	388	Bengaluru – Kodikonda, Pulivendula, Mallepali, Vangapadu, Addanki, Chilakaluripet, Guntur, Vijayawada.		—	—	Link
NH 565	409.9	254.7	Nakrekal on NH-65 - Nalgonda, Macherla, Erragondapalam, Kanigiri, Rapur, Venkatagiri -junction with NH-71 near Erpedu		—	—	
NH 716	237.8	147.8	Tamil Nadu Border-Reniguta, Mamanduru, Settigunta, Koduru, Pullampeta, Rajampet, Nandalur, Madhavaram, Vonimitta, Bhakarapet, Kadapa (Cuddapah), Kuarunipalli, Vellore, Thapetla, Kothapalli, Chidipirala, Pandillapalle, Thiparulu, Yeragunttla, Nidizivve, Chillamakuru, and terminating at its junction with NH-67 near Muddanuru		—	—	
NH 716A	42.6	26.5	Junction with NH-716 near Puttur connecting, Narayana Vanam, Thumburu, Koppedu, Harijan, Vada, Ramagiri, Krishnapuram, Utthukottai -Tamil Nadu.		—	—	
NH 716B	20.0	12.4	The highway starting from its junction with NH-16 near Thachur in the state of Tamil Nadu and terminating at its junction with NH-40 near Chittoor in the state of Andhra Pradesh.		—	—	Link
NH 716G	—	—	Junction of NH 716 at Muddanur, a small town in Kadapa district, Pulivendula, Kadiri (junction with NH 42), ObulaDevaraCheruvu, Gorantla, Palasamudram, Junction of NH 544E near Hindupur.		—	—	
NH 765	77.6	48.2	Hyderabad (Junction of NH-44 & 40) - Maisaram, Amangal, Veldanda, Kalvakurti, Achampet, Srisailam, Doranala - junction with NH-565 near Tokapalle		—	—	

== Arunachal Pradesh ==
Number	Length (km)	Length (mi)	Southern or western terminus	Northern or eastern terminus	Formed	Removed	Notes
NH 13	1293.0	803.4	Tawang	Wakro, Lohit	—	—	
NH 15	79.0	49.1	Mahadevpur/Dirak (Assam Border) to junction with NH-13 near Wakro		—	—	
NH 113	165.0	102.5	NH-13 near Hawacamp - Hayuliang - Hawai.		—	—	
NH 115	19.5	12.1	Shantipur (Assam border) to Meka junction near Roing (NH-13)		—	—	
NH 215	266.6	165.7	Junction with NH-15 near Mahadevpur - Bordumsa, Namchik, Lalpul, Manmao, Changlang, Khonsa, Kanubari- Assam Border		—	—	
NH 313	235.0	146.0	NH-13 near Meka - Anini.		—	—	
NH 315	32.5	20.2	Assam border - Jairampur - Nampong - Myanmar border (Stilwell road)		—	—	
NH 315A	35.0	21.7	Khonsa on NH-215 - Hukanjuri - Assam Border		—	—	
NH 415	50.8	31.6	Holongi (Assam border) - Itanagar - Banderdewa (Assam border)		—	—	
NH 513	140.0	87.0	NH-13 near Passighat - Mariyang -Yingkiong.		—	—	
NH 515	28.0	17.4	Jonai (Assam Border) - junction with NH-13 near Pasighat		—	—	
NH 713	158.0	98.2	NH-13 near Joram - Palin- Sangram- Koloriang.		—	—	
NH 713A	35.0	21.7	Junction with NH-13 near Hoj - Yupia - NH-415 at Pappu (near Nahurlagun)		—	—	

== Assam ==
Number	Length (km)	Length (mi)	Southern or western terminus	Northern or eastern terminus	Formed	Removed	Notes
NH 2	112.0	69.6	Junction with NH-15 near Dibrugarh in the State of Assam connecting Sibsagar and Amguri in the State of Assam- Nagaland		—	—	
NH 6	117.7	73.1	The highway starting from its junction with NH-27 near Jorabat in the State of Assam-Meghalaya.		—	—	
NH 8	61.1	38.0	The highway starting from its junction with NH-37 near Karimganj in the State of Assam connecting Patharkandi, Churaibari, Ambasa, Teliamura, Agartala, Udaipur, Sabrum and terminating at Indo/Bangladesh Border in the State of Tripura.		—	—	
NH 15	586.5	364.4	The highway starting from its junction with NH-27 near Baihata-Charali connecting Mangaldai, Dhekiajuli, Tezpur, Banderdeva, North Lakhimpur, Dibrugarh, Tinsukia, Dum Duma in the State of Assam-Arunachal Pradesh.		—	—	
NH 17	294.2	182.8	West Bengal-Golakganj, Bilasipara-North Salmara, Goalpara, Boko and terminating at its junction with NH-27 near Guwahati in the State of Assam.		—	—	
NH 27	724.8	450.4	West Bengal, Bongaigaon, Bijini, Patacharkuchi, Nalbari, Dishpur, Nagaon, Lumding, Haflong and terminating at its junction with NH-37 near Silchar in the State of Assam.		—	—	
NH 29	124.0	77.1	Junction with NH-27 near Dabaka, (Sutargaon), Amlakhi, in Assam - Nagaland		—	—	
NH 37	110.0	68.4	Manipur-Jirighat, Lakhipur, Silchar, Badarpur, Bhanga, Karimganj in the State of Assam and terminates at Indo/Bangladesh Border.		—	—	
NH 115	59.1	36.7	Junction with NH-15 near Dum Duma - Saikhoaghat, Kundil Bazar-Arunachal Pradesh.		—	—	
NH 117	15.0	9.3	Junction with NH-17 near North Salmara - junction with NH-27 near Bijni.		—	—	
NH 117A	39.8	24.7	Junction with NH-17 near Bilasipara - Kokrajhar - junction with New NH-27 near Garubhasa		—	—	
NH 127	43.0	26.7	Junction with NH-27 near Nagaon - Samaguri - junction with NH-715 near Jakhalabandha		—	—	
NH 127A	38.0	23.6	Junction with NH-27 near Patacharkuchi - Hajua - Indo/Bhutan Border.		—	—	
NH 127B	74.0	46.0	Srimrampur on N.H-27, Dhuburi -Meghalaya.		—	—	
NH 127C	40.0	24.9	NH- 27 in Chirang District, Assam - India / Bhutan Border.		—	—	
NH 127D	48.6	30.2	NH- 27 in the district of Kamrup, Assam - India / Bhutan Border.		—	—	
NH 127E	40.8	25.4	Junction with NH-27 near Barama - Baska, Subankhata -Indo/Bhutan border		—	—	
NH 129	106.0	65.9	Nagaland - Bokajan, Golaghat - junction with NH-715 near Numaligarh		—	—	
NH 208A	17.9	11.1	Tripura-Kathaltali, Kukital and terminating at its junction with NH- 8 (Old NH-44)near Chankhera in the state of Assam.		—	—	
NH 215	63.4	39.4	Arunachal Pradesh - junction with NH-15 near Dibrugarh		—	—	
NH 217	30.5	19.0	Junction with NH-17 near Paikan in the State of Assam -Meghalaya and terminating at its junction with NH-17 near Dudhnai in the State of Assam.		—	—	
NH 306	40.3	25.0	The highway starting from its junction with NH-6 near Kanpui in the State of Mizoram and terminating at its junction with NH-37 near Silchar in the State of Assam.		—	—	
NH 315	80.1	49.8	Junction with NH-15 near Makum - Ledo, Lekhapani in the State of Assam, Licok near NH and terminating at India/Myanmar Border.		—	—	
NH 315A	64.2	39.9	Tinsukia on N.H-15 - Naharkatia-Arunachal Pradesh.		—	—	
NH 329	52.8	32.8	Junction with NH-29 near Manja - Diphu - junction with new NH No. 27 near Lumding		—	—	
NH 329A	38.0	23.6	Junction with NH No-329 near Diphu-Nagaland.		—	—	
NH 415	9.7	6.0	Junction with NH-15 near Ghopur in the State of Assam connecting Itanagar in the State of Arunachal Pradesh, Daimukh and terminating at its junction with NH-15 near Banderdeva in the State of Assam.		—	—	
NH 427	92.2	57.3	Junction with NH-27 near Howli - Barpeta, Hajo - junction with new NH No. 27 near Jalukbari		—	—	
NH 515	73.0	45.4	Junction with NH-15 near Kulajan - Jonai-Arunachal Pradesh.		—	—	
NH 627	244.2	151.7	Junction with new NH-27 near Nelle (Amsoi Gate) - Rajagaon, Doyangmukh, Umrangso, Khobak - NH-27 near Harangajao		—	—	
NH 702	28.4	17.6	The highway starting from its junction with NH-2 near Chantongia connecting Longling, Lonhching, Mon, Lapa, Tizit in the State of Nagaland, Sonari and terminating at its junction with new NH No. 215 near Sapekhati in the State of Assam.		—	—	
NH 702C	52.0	32.3	The highway starting from its junction with Sibasagar on NH-2 connecting Simalguri and terminating at its junction with new NH No. 702 at Sonari in the State of Assam.		—	—	
NH 702D	49.6	30.8	The highway starting from its junction with new NH No 2 near Mokokchung in the state of Nagaland connecting Mariami and terminating at NH-715 near Jorhat in the state of Assam.		—	—	
NH 715	195.1	121.2	Junction with NH-15 near Tejpur - Jakhalabandha, Bokakhat, Jorhat - junction with NH-2 near Jhanji		—	—	
NH 715A	142.5	88.5	Junction with NH-27 near Nakhola - Jagiroad, Marigaon, Kaupati, Rowta, Udalguri, Khoirabari - Indo/Bhutan border		—	—	

== Bihar ==
Bihar has length of 5,358 km National highways.

Number	Length (km)	Length (mi)	Southern or western terminus	Northern or eastern terminus	Formed	Removed	Notes
NH 19GQ	206.0	128.0	Uttar Pradesh, Mohania, Aurangabad, Dobhi-Jharkhand		—	—	
NH 20	107.7	66.9	Junction with NH-31 near Bakhtiyarpur - Bihar Sharif, Nawada, Rajauli -Jharkhand		—	—	
NH 22	282.3	175.4	Sonbarsa (Indo/Nepal Border), Sitamarhi, Muzaffarpur, Hajipur, Patna, Punpun, Gaya, Bodh Gaya, Dobhi - Jharkhand.		—	—	
NH 27EW	487.0	302.6	Uttar Pradesh Gopalganj, Pipra Kothi, Muzaffarpur, Darbhanga, Forbesganj, Araria, Purnia, in the State of BiharWest Bengal		—	—	
NH 31	415.0	257.9	The highway starting from its junction with NH-27 near Unnao connecting Lalganj, Raebareli, Salon, Pratapgarh, Machhlishahr, Jaunpur, Varanasi, Ghazipur, Ballia in the State of Uttar Pradesh Chhapra, Hajipur, Bakhtiyarpur, Mokama, Begusarai, Khagaria, Bihpur, Kora, Katihar in the State of Bihar, Harishchanderpur and terminating at its junction with NH-12 near Pandua in the State of West Bengal.		—	—	
NH 33	332.0	206.3	The highway starting from its junction with NH-139 from Arwal connecting Jahanabad, Bandhuganj, Ekangarsarai, Biharsharif, Mokama, Luckeesarai, Munger, Bhagalpur, Kahalgaon in the State of Bihar, Sahibganj, Rajmahal, Barharwa in the State of Jharkhand and terminating at its junction with NH-12 near Farakka in the State of West Bengal.		—	—	
NH 119	93.0	57.8	The highway starting from its junction with NH-19 near Dehri connecting Akbarpur, Jadunathpur and terminating at Bihar/UP Border near Jadunathpur in the State of Bihar.		—	—	
NH 120	244.0	151.6	Junction with NH-20 near Bihar Sharif connecting Nalanda, Rajgir, Hisua, Gaya, Daudnagar, Nasriganj, Karakat, dawath, Nawanagar, and terminating at its junction with NH-922 near Dumraon		—	—	
NH 122	110.0	68.4	Junction with NH-22 near Muzaffarpur - Dholi, Mushrigharari - junction with NH-31 near Barauni		—	—	
NH 122A	31.8	19.8	Vishwanathpur Chowk on NH-22 - Koili, a- Nanpur on NH-527C		—	—	
NH 131	136.0	84.5	The highway starting from its junction with NH-31 near Bihpur connecting Kishanganj, Madhepura and terminating at Birpur in the State of Bihar near Indo/Nepal Border.		—	—	
NH 131A	81.2	50.5	West Bengal- Ahmedabad, Manihari, Katihar on NH-31 - Purnia on NH-27		—	—	
NH 133	10.9	6.8	The highway starting from its junction with NH-33 in the state of Bihar connecting Godda and terminating at Choupa More on NH-114A in the state of Jharkhand.		—	—	
NH 133B	5.0	3.1	Jharkhand Border- Manihar (NH-31)		—	—	
NH 139	153.6	95.4	The highway starting from its junction with NH-39 near Rajhara connecting Chhatarpur, Hariharganj in the State of Jharkhand, Aurangabad, Daudnagar, Arwal, Naubatpur and terminating at its junction with NH-31 near Patna in the State of Bihar.		—	—	
NH 219	46.8	29.1	The highway starting from its junction with new NH No. 19 near Mohania connecting Bhabhua, Chainpur, Chand in the State of Bihar and terminating at its junction with NH-19 near Chandauli in the state of Uttar Pradesh		—	—	
NH 227	215.0	133.6	The highway starting from its junction with NH-27 near Chakia connecting Narhar, Pakri Bridge, Madhuban, Shivhar, Sitamarhi, Harlakhi, Umgaon, Jaynagar, Laukaha, Laukahi and terminating at its junction with NH-27 near Narahia in the State of Bihar.		—	—	
NH 227A	137.0	85.1	Up / Bihar Border - Siwan - Mashrakh - Chakia		—	—	
NH 227F	36.3	22.6	The highway starting from its junction with NH- 227 near Chakia (Chorma chowk) connecting Pakridayal, Dhaka, Phulwaria Ghat and terminating at Bairgania in the state of Bihar near Indo / Nepal Border.		—	—	
NH 227J	30.0	18.6	The highway starting from its junction with NH- 227 near Saharghat connecting Uchhait, Benipatti and terminating at its junction with NH- 527B near Rahika in the state of Bihar		—	—	
NH 227L	20.4	12.7	The highway starting from its junction with NH- 227 near Umagaon connecting Basopatti and terminating at its junction with NH- 527B near Kalnahi in the state of Bihar.		—	—	
NH 231	209.0	129.9	The highway starting from its junction with NH-31 near Maheshkund in the State of Bihar connecting Sonbarsa Raj, Simri Bakhtiyarpur, Saharsa, Madhepura, Sarsi, Purnia and terminating at its junction with NH-31 near Kora in the State of Bihar.		—	—	
NH 319	125.0	77.7	Junction with NH-19 near Mohania - Dinara, Charpokhari, a- junction with NH-922 near Ara		—	—	
NH 322	58.0	36.0	The highway starting from its junction with NH-22 near Hazipur and terminating at its junction with NH-122 near Mushrigharari in the State of Bihar.		—	—	
NH 327	233.5	145.1	The highway starting from Galgalia on N.H-327 (W.B/Bihar) Thakurganj, Raniganj, Bahadurganj, Araria, Bhargama, Tribeniganj, Pipra, Supaul, (Bariyahi Bazar)Bangaon and terminating at Maheshi (Tarapeeth) in the state of Bihar.		—	—	
NH 327A	25.0	15.5	The highway starting from Supaul on NH-327 and terminating at Bhaptiahi on NH-27 in the state of Bihar.		—	—	
NH 331	65.0	40.4	The highway starting from its junction with NH-31 near Chhapra connecting Baniapur, and terminating at its junction with NH-27 near Muhumadpur the State of Bihar.		—	—	
NH 333	141.2	87.7	The highway starting from Bariyarpur on NH-33 connecting Kharagpur, Laxmipur, Jamui, Chakai in the state of Bihar-Jharkhand		—	—	
NH 333A	198.9	123.6	The highway starting from its junction with NH-33 near Bar Bigha connecting Shekhpura, Sikandra, Jamui, Jha-Jha, Banka in the State of Bihar and terminating at its junction with NH-133 near Godda in the State of Jharkhand.		—	—	
NH 333B	17.7	11.0	The highway starting from its junction with NH33 at Munger and terminating at its junction with NH No-31 at Khagaria in the state of Bihar.		—	—	
NH 431	69.0	42.9	The highway starting from its junction with NH-31 near Phatuha connecting Chandi, Harnaut and terminating at its junction with NH-31 near Barh in the State of Bihar.		—	—	
NH 527	9.3	5.8	The highway starting from its junction with NH-27 near Forbesganj and terminating at Jogbani in the State of Bihar.		—	—	
NH 527A	75.3	46.8	The highway starting from its junction with new NH No.527 B near Pokhrauni Chowk connecting Madhubani, Rampatti, Jhanjharpur, Samey Chowk, Awam, Laufa, Bheja, Bakaur and terminating at its junction with NH No. 327 near Parsarma in the State of Bihar.		—	—	
NH 527B	53.8	33.4	The highway starting from its junction with NH-27 near Darbhanga connecting Aunsi and terminating at its junction with NH-227 near Jaynagar in the State of Bihar.		—	—	
NH 527C	64.2	39.9	The highway starting from Majhauli on NH-27 connecting Katra, Jajuar, Pupri and terminating at Charout on NH-227 in the state of Bihar.		—	—	
NH 527D	67.2	41.8	The highway starting from its junction with NH-27 near Piprakothi connecting Sagauli, Raxaul, in the State of Bihar and terminating at Indo/Nepal Border.		—	—	
NH 531	95.0	59.0	The highway starting from its junction with NH-31 near Chhapra, Siwan and terminating at its junction with NH-27 near Gopalganj in the State of Bihar.		—	—	
NH 722	75.0	46.6	The highway starting from its junction with NH-22 near Muzaffarpur connecting Rewaghat and terminating at its junction with NH-31 near Chhapra in the State of Bihar.		—	—	
NH 727	112.0	69.6	The highway starting from its junction with NH-27 near Kushinagar in the State of Uttar Pradesh connecting Chhitanuni Rail-cum-Road Bridge, Bagaha, Lauriya, Bettiah and terminating at its junction with NH-527 D near Chhapwa in the State of Bihar.		—	—	
NH 727A	4.5	2.8	Uttar Pradesh and terminating at its junction with NH 227A near Mairwa		—	—	
NH 727AA	13.0	8.1	The highway starting from its junction with NH-727 near Manuapul connecting Patzirwa, Paknaha in the state of Bihar, Pipraghat and terminating at its junction with NH-730 near Sevrahi in the state of Uttar Pradesh.		—	—	
NH 922	138.0	85.7	The highway starting from its junction with NH-22 near Patna connecting Ara, Bhojpur and terminating near Buxar in the State of Bihar.		—	—	

== Chhattisgarh ==
Number	Length (km)	Length (mi)	Southern or western terminus	Northern or eastern terminus	Formed	Removed	Notes
NH 30	631.4	392.3	Madhya Pradesh, Chilpi, Simga, Raipur, Dhamtari, Kanker, Kondagaon, Keskal, Jagdalpur and Konta in the State of Chhattisgarh-Andhra Pradesh.		—	—	
NH 43	353.0	219.3	Madhya Pradesh-Nagar, Ambikapur, Pathalgaon, Jashpurnagar-Jharkhand.		—	—	
NH 45	98.3	61.1	Madhya Pradesh - Keonchi (Kionchi) - junction with NH-130 near Bilaspur		—	—	
NH 49	197.0	122.4	Junction with NH-130 at Bilaspur connecting Pamgarh, Raigarh-Orissa		—	—	
NH 53	322.0	200.1	Maharashtra-Rajnandgaon, Durg, Raipur, Arang, Saraipali-Orissa		—	—	
NH 63	234.2	145.5	Maharashtra - Bijapur, Jagdalpur-Orissa.		—	—	
NH 130	389.9	242.3	Junction with NH-30 near Simga - Bilaspur, Kathgora - junction with NH-43 near Ambikapur		—	—	
NH 130A	279.4	173.6	Junction with NH-30 near Pondi - Pandaria, Mungeli, Bilaspur, Sipat, Dhania, Baloda, Panthora, Urga, Hasti, Bhaisma, Nonbira, Dharamjayagarh - junction with NH-130 near Pathalgaon		—	—	
NH 130B	188.0	116.8	Raipur on NH-30 - Palari, Baloda Bazar, Kasdol - junction with NH No. 153 near Sarangarh		—	—	
NH 130C	195.6	121.5	NH-30 near Abhanpur - Rajim, Gariaband, Bardula, Deobhog- Odisha Border		—	—	
NH 130D	98.0	60.9	Junction with NH-30 near Kondagaon - Narainpur, Kutul -Maharashtra Border		—	—	
NH 143B	15.0	9.3	The highway starting from its junction with NH-43 near Jashpurnagar in the state of Chhattisgarh connecting Gobindpur, Dumri and terminating near Mahuandanr in the State of Jharkhand.		—	—	
NH 149B	70.0	43.5	NH-49 near Champa - Korba, Chhuri -Junction with new NH No. 130 near Katghora		—	—	
NH 153	86.8	53.9	Junction with NH-53 at Saraipali - Sarangarh - junction with NH-49 at Raigarh		—	—	
NH 163	36.0	22.4	Junction with NH-63 near Bhopalpatnam -Telangana		—	—	
NH 163A	12.0	7.5	Geedam(Gidam) on NH-63- Dantewara		—	—	
NH 343	110.0	68.4	Ambikapur (NH-78) - Semarsot - Ramanujganj - Jharkhand border		—	—	
NH 353	65.6	40.8	Junction with NH-53 near Ghorai - Mahasamund, Bagbahra -Orissa.		—	—	
NH 930	115.3	71.6	NH-30 near Purur - Balod, Kusumkasa, Kumhari, Manpur- Maharastra Border		—	—	
NH 130CD	108.4	67.4	Junction with NH-30 (Kurud Bypass), Umarda, Megha, Bijhuli, Singhpur, Dugli, Dongardula, Nagari, Sonamagar, Sihawa, Ratawa-Odisha.		—	—	

== Goa ==
Number	Length (km)	Length (mi)	Southern or western terminus	Northern or eastern terminus	Formed	Removed	Notes
NH 66	30.9	19.2	Karnataka- Poriem, Matnee - Sanquelim (near Shri Dattaraya Mandir)		—	—	
NH 366	137.6	85.5	Maharashtra Border - Pernem - Mapusa - Panaji - Cortalim - Verna - Margao - Cuncolim - Chaudi (Chauri) - Polem - Karnataka Boader		—	—	
NH 566	16.5	10.3	Cortalim (Kortali) - Sancoale - Chicalim - Murmugao		—	—	
NH 748	69.6	43.2	Karnataka Border - Darbandora - Ponda - Bhoma - Banastari - Panaji		—	—	
NH 748AA	38.5	23.9	Ponda - Verna - Vasco de Gama		—	—	

== Gujarat ==
Number	Length (km)	Length (mi)	Southern or western terminus	Northern or eastern terminus	Formed	Removed	Notes
NE 1	93.4	58.0	Ahmadabad - Vadodara Expressway		—	—	
NH 27	974.6	605.6	Porbandar in the State of Gujarat connecting Bamanbore, Morbi, Samakhiali, Radhanpur, Palanpur-Rajasthan		—	—	
NH 41	290.0	180.2	Samakhiyali connecting Gandhidham, Mandvi, Naliya and terminating at Narayan Sarovar		—	—	
NH 47	388.2	241.2	Junction with NH-27 near Bamanbore connecting Limbdi, Ahmedabad, Godhra, Dahod-Madhya Pradesh		—	—	
NH 48	488.7	303.7	Rajasthan Border - Himatnagar - Ahmedabad - Nadiad - Anand - Vadodara - Karjan - Bharuch - Ankleshwar - Navsari - Valsad - Vapi - Maharashtra Border		—	—	
NH 51	731.0	454.2	Bet Dwarka including Signature Bridge - Okha- Dwarka, Bhogat, Porbandar, Navibander, Shil, Mangrol, Somnath, Kodinar, Una, Mahuva, Talaja, Bhavnagar, Songadh, Gadhada, Botad, ranpur, Limbdi, Surendranagar, Dhrangadhra- Kuda		—	—	
NH 53	137.6	85.5	Hajira - Surat - Bardoli - Vyara - Songadh - Maharashtra Border		—	—	
NH 56	429.0	266.6	Rajasthan Border.-Zalod-Limbi-Dahod - Madhya Pradesh border-Chhota Udaipur - Rajpipla - Netrang - Vyara - Bansda - Dharampur - Vapi (NH-48)		—	—	
NH 58	152.0	94.4	Rajasthan Border -Idar (NH-58) - Vadali - Dharoi - Satlasana - Palanpur (NH-27 )		—	—	
NH 64	386.0	239.8	Ahmedabad - Dandi route (Dandi Heritage route)		—	—	
NH 68	268.0	166.5	Tharad-Bhabar- Radhanpur- Kamalpur- Khakhal- Roda- Dunawada- Patan- Chansama- Mahesana- Kherva- Gojariya- Sama- Churada- Kuvadara - junction with NH-48 near Prantij.		—	—	
NH 141	14.0	8.7	Gandhi Dham and terminating at Kandla Port		—	—	
NH 147	46.0	28.6	Junction with NH No. 47 near Sarkhej - Gandhinagar - junction with NH-48 near Chilloda		—	—	
NH 147D	47.3	29.4	Junction with NH-47 near Limkheda connecting Hathidhara, Fulpari, Limdi and terminating at Gujarat/ Madhya Pradesh Border		—	—	
NH 148M	56.0	34.8	Junction with NH-48 near Vadodara connecting Bhaili, Samiyala, Laxmipura, Sangam, Padra, Dabhasa, Mahuvad, Kinkhlod, Pakiza Society in Borsad, Nisraya, Alarsa, Kosindra Indiranagar and terminating at Anklav		—	—	
NH 148N	200.0	124.3	The highway starting from its junction with NH-48 near Dodka (Vadodara) connecting Godhra, Dahod in the state of Gujarat, Ratlam, Jaora in the state of Madhya Pradesh, Jhalawar, Kota, Sawai Madhopur, Lalsot, Dausa in the state of Rajasthan, Firozpur Jhirka and terminating at its junction with NH-248A near Sohna in the state of Haryana.		—	—	
NH 151	127.8	79.4	Jetpur - Junagadh -Maliya - Somnath		—	—	
NH 151A	290.0	180.2	The highway starting from its junction with NH 51 near Dwarka connecting Khambaliya, Jamnagar, Dhrol, Amran and terminating at its junction at NH 27 near Maliya in the State of Gujrat (excluding from existing km 125 to Dhrol Junction (77.80 km) and from Pipaliya junction-Maliya Junction (24 km.).		—	—	
NH 168	74.0	46.0	Junction with NH-68 near Tharad - Dhanera, Panthvada		—	—	
NH 168A	66.0	41.0	Dhanera -junction with NH- 27 near Deesa		—	—	
NH 251	20.0	12.4	NH-51 near Una - Ghoghla in the Union Territory of Daman and Diu - NH-51 near Kesaria in the State of Gujarat.		—	—	
NH 341	152.0	94.4	NH-41 near Bhimsar - Anjar- Bhuj- Khavda - Dharmshala		—	—	
NH 351	143.0	88.9	NH-51 near Mahuva- Saverkundla- Amreli- Bagasara - Jetpur on NH-27.		—	—	
NH 351F	54.4	33.8	Junction with NH-351 near Amreli connecting ishvariya, Varasda, Pipariya, Toda, Lathy, Mahavirnagar, Chavand and terminating at its junction with NH-51 near Dhasa Chowk		—	—	
NH 751	121.8	75.7	Junction with NH-51 (Nari Junction) near Bhavnagar connecting Bhavaliyari, Dholera, Ambi, Valinda, Pimpali, Anandpur, Bholad, Saragval, Vejalka, Keshargadh, Rupgadh, Kariyana, Sarandhi, Jalalpur (Godhneshwar), Lana, Sindhrej, Roopavati, Juval, Chaloda, Kavitha, Vasna Chacharavadi, Bhat, Tajpur, Visalpur and terminating at Sardar Patel Ring road near Sarkhej (Ahemedabad)		—	—	
NH 751D	44.0	27.3	Junction with NH-751 near Vataman Chowk connecting Fatepura, Valandapura, Indranaj, Tarapur, Lakulesh Nagar and terminating at its junction with NH-64 near Dharmaj		—	—	
NH 751DD	27.3	17.0	Junction with new NH-751D near Tarapur connecting Sojitra, Piplav, Sunav and terminating near Bandhani Chowk		—	—	
NH 753B	70.0	43.5	Dediapada - Netrang on NH-56		—	—	
NH 754K	385.0	239.2	The highway starting from its junction with new NH-54 near Sangariya connecting Hanumangarh, Suratgarh, Loonkarasar, Bikaner, Jodhpur, Thob, Pachpadra, Balotra, Sanchore in the state of Rajasthan, Tharad, Vav, Santalpur, Gadkabet, Mauvana, Dholavira, Khavada, Odama, Hajipur, Gadhuli and terminating at Lakhpat in the state of Gujarat.		—	—	
NH 756	48.4	30.1	Junction with NH-56 near Bodeli connecting Jambugodha, Pavagarh and terminating at Halol bypass in Halol		—	—	
NH 848	67.6	42.0	Maharashtra border - Kaprada - Pardi (NH-48)		—	—	
NH 848A	7.0	4.3	Zaroli (NH-48) - Dadra Nagar Haveli border		—	—	
NH 848B	14.0	8.7	NH-48 near Karembali Phatak - Bamanpunja, Dholar Road- Daman & Diu		—	—	
NH 927D	108.0	67.1	NH-27 near Dhoraji- Jamkandoma- Kalavad -Jamnagar.		—	—	
NH 953	113.0	70.2	NH-53 near Songudh - Ahwa- Gujarat-Maharashtra border.		—	—	

== Haryana ==
Number	Length (km)	Length (mi)	Southern or western terminus	Northern or eastern terminus	Formed	Removed	Notes
NE 2	44.0	27.3	Eastern Peripheral Expressway around in UP and Haryana (UNDER CONSTRUCTION)		—	—	
NH 5	28.3	17.6	Ambala - Punjab border-Stretch in Punjab-Punjab border - Panchkula - Chandi Mandir - Pinjaur - Kalka - H.P. Border		—	—	
NH 7	39.5	24.5	Punjab, Panchkula, Raipur Rani, Dhanana in the State of Haryana-Himachal Pradesh		—	—	
NH 9	285.9	177.7	Delhi Border - Bahadurgarh - Rohtak - Maham - Hansi - Hissar - Agroha - Bodopal - Fatehabad - Sirsa - Odhan - Dabwali - Punjab border		—	—	
NH 11	88.0	54.7	Narnaul - junction with new NH No.-352 near Rewari		—	—	
NH 44	257.8	160.2	Punjab border- Ambala -Shahbad-Pipli-Karnal-Panipat-Samalkha-Murthal-Kundli-Delhi border - Delhi - Faridabad - Ballabgarh - Palwal - Rundhi - Hodal - UP Border		—	—	
NH 48	83.3	51.8	Delhi Border - Gurgaon - Dharuhera - Bawal - Rajasthan Border		—	—	
NH 52	143.2	89.0	Punjab -Narwana, Hisar in the State of Haryana-Rajasthan		—	—	
NH 54	38.5	23.9	Dabwali - Punjab border		—	—	
NH 105	17.5	10.9	Pinjaur - Karanpur - H.P. Border		—	—	
NH 148A	6.0	3.7	Delhi border - Gurgaon (Jn. of NH-8)		—	—	
NH 148B	226.0	140.4	Rajasthan Border-Narnaul-Mahendergarh-Charkhi Dadri-Bhiwani-Hansi-Barwala-Yohana-Punjab Border		—	—	
NH 148N	80.0	49.7	The highway starting from its junction with NH-48 near Dodka (Vadodara) connecting Godhra, Dahod in the state of Gujarat, Ratlam, Jaora in the state of Madhya Pradesh, Jhalawar, Kota, Sawai Madhopur, Lalsot, Dausa in the state of Rajasthan, Firozpur Jhirka and terminating at its junction with NH-248A near Sohna in the state of Haryana.		—	—	
NH 152	122.0	75.8	Junction with NH-52 near Narwana, Kaithal, Ambala and terminating at its junction with NH-7 near Panchkula in the State of Haryana.		—	—	
NH 152A	19.4	12.1	The highway starting from its junction with NH-52 near Khanauri, Shergarh, Amo in the state of Punjab, Sangatpura, Nand, Sighwala, Sanghan, Mahal Kheri, Padala, Gandhi and terminating at its junction with NH-152 near Kaithal in the State of Haryana.		—	—	
NH 152D	230.0	142.9	The highway starting from its junction with NH-152 near Gangheri (near Ismailabad), Kaul Dhatrath, Lakhan Majra, Kalanaur, Charkhi Dadri and terminating at its junction with NH-148B (Narnaul bypass) in the State of Haryana.		—	—	
NH 248A	111.0	69.0	NH-48 near Sahpura - Alwar, Ramgarh, Haryana/Rajasthan border in the state of Rajasthan, Nuh and terminating at its junction with new NH No. 48 near Gurgaon		—	—	
NH 248BB	18.1	11.2	Junction with NH No. 48 near Shiv Murti - Bharthal Chowk, Delhi/Haryana border in the Union Territory of National Capital Territory of Delhi and terminating near Kherki Daula on NH-48 in the State of Haryana.		—	—	
NH 254	47.0	29.2	Punjab Border- Near Dabwali (NH No.-54)		—	—	
NH 334B	180.0	111.8	Sonipat, Kharkhauda, Sampla, Jhajjar, Charkhi Dadri- junction with NH 709 near Loharu		—	—	
NH 334D	17.0	10.6	Uttar Pradesh Border- junction with NH-44 near Palwal		—	—	
NH 344	109.4	68.0	The highway starting from its junction with NH-44 near Ambala connecting Dhanana, Saha, Yamunanagar in the State of Haryana-Uttar Pradesh		—	—	
NH 352	186.1	115.6	The highway starting from its junction with NH-52 near Narwana connecting Jind, Rohtak, Jhajjar, Rewari and terminating at its junction with NH-48 near Bawal in the State of Haryana.		—	—	
NH 352A	80.0	49.7	Jind (NH-352)-Gohana-sonipat (NH-334 B)		—	—	
NH 352R	22.5	14.0	The highway starting from its junction with NH-352 (Jhajjar Bypass) connecting Dulhera, Daboda Khurd, Nuna Majra and terminating at its junction with NH- 9 (Bahadurgarh Bypass) in the state of Haryana.		—	—	
NH 352W	43.2	26.8	The highway starting from its junction with NH-352 near Vijay Nagar (Rewari) connecting Kakoria, Jaitpur, Pataudi, Jamalpur, Wazirpur, Harsaru and terminating at its junction with NH- 48 near Shaktinagar (Gurugram) in the state of Haryana.		—	—	
NH 444A	42.0	26.1	Junction with NH No. 44 near Ambala-Saha -junction with NH No. 44 at Sahabad		—	—	
NH 703	15.0	9.3	Sardulgarh - junction with new NH No. 9 near Sirsa		—	—	
NH 709	188.3	117.0	Rohtak - Gohana - Israna - Panipat // Rohtak – Bhiwani – Lohani - Loharu - Rajasthan Border.		—	—	
NH 709A	170.0	105.6	Bhiwani (NH-709) - Mundal- Jind- Karnal- Uttar Pradesh Border		—	—	
NH 709AD	30.0	18.6	junction with NH-709 near Panipat -UP Border		—	—	
NH 907	45.9	28.5	Yamuna Nagar (NH-73) - Jagadhri Chowk (Jn with NH-73) - Chhachhrauli - Ledi - Darpur - H.P. border		—	—	
NH 907G	14.9	9.3	The Highway starting from its junction with NH No- 907 near Jagadhri connecting Jaroda, Budheri, Bherthal, Mahmoodpur, Salempur Banger and terminating near Bilaspur in the state of Haryana.		—	—	
NH 919	67.9	42.2	Rewari - Dharuhera - Raj. Border/Raj. Border - Taoru - Sohna - Palwal		—	—	

== Himachal Pradesh ==
Number	Length (km)	Length (mi)	Southern or western terminus	Northern or eastern terminus	Formed	Removed	Notes
NH 3	542.6	337.2	Nadaun- Hamirpur- Tauni Devi- Awa Devi- Mandi- Kullu- Manali- Gramphoo- Kyelong		—	—	
NH 5	405.0	251.7	Haryana Border-Solan, Shimla, Theog, Narkanda, Rampur, Chini and proceeding to the Border between India and Tibet near Shipkila		—	—	
NH 7	57.0	35.4	Haryana Border-Ponta-Sahib- Uttarakhand Border		—	—	
NH 44NS	11.1	6.9	Punjab Border near Pathankot- Nangal- Punjab Border		—	—	
NH 103	76.6	47.6	junction with NH-3 near Hamirpur and connecting Bhota, Ghumarwain and terminating near Ghaghas on NH 154		—	—	
NH 105	48.9	30.4	Junction with NH-5 near Pinjore in Haryana connecting Baddi, Nalagarh and terminating at its junction with NH-205 near Swarghat		—	—	
NH 154	267.9	166.5	Punjab Border- Nurpur, Palampur, Jogindarnagar, Mandi, Sundar Nagar Ghaghas, Bilaspur -junction with NH-205 near Nauni		—	—	
NH 154A	133.0	82.6	Punjab Border- Banikhet- Chamba -Bharmour		—	—	
NH 205	114.0	70.8	Punjab Border- Swarghat, Nauni, Darlaghat- junction with NH-5 near Shimla		—	—	
NH 303	70.4	43.7	Junction of NH-154 connecting Ranital, Jawalamukhi - Nadaun on NH-3		—	—	
NH 305	97.0	60.3	Aut (NH-21) - Banjar - Ani - Luhri - Sainj (NH-22)		—	—	
NH 503	140.2	87.1	Punjab Border-Dehlan-Una-Amb-Junction with NH-3 at Mubarakpur connecting Dera Gopipur, Ranital, Kangra, Mataur, Dharamshala - Macleodganj		—	—	
NH 503A	72.0	44.7	Punjab, Una, Basoli, Barsar, Salooni and terminating at its junction with NH-103 near Bhota		—	—	
NH 505	282.0	175.2	Junction with NH-5 near Khab Sangam - Chango- Sumdo- Tabo- Attargo- Kaza- Morang- Hanse- Losar- Lachu- Chhota Dhara -Gramphoo		—	—	
NH 505A	17.0	10.6	Junction with NH-5 near Powari - Reckong Peo - Kalpa		—	—	
NH 705	68.0	42.3	Theong (New NH-5)-Kotkhai-Jubbal-Hatkoti (NH-707)		—	—	
NH 707	118.8	73.8	Uttrakhand Border- terminating at Hatkoti in Himachal Pradesh		—	—	
NH 907	7.4	4.6	Junction with NH-7 near Paonta Sahib-Haryana Border		—	—	
NH 907A	78.0	48.5	Starting from its junction with NH No.-7 near Nahan Banethi-Sarahan & terminating at its junction with NH No.-5 near Kumarhatti in the state of Himachal Pradesh		—	—	

== Jharkhand ==
Number	Length (km)	Length (mi)	Southern or western terminus	Northern or eastern terminus	Formed	Removed	Notes
NH 18	215.5	133.9	Govindpur (NH-2) - Dhanbad - Chas - Kumardega - West Bengal Border/West Bengal border - Chandil - Jamshedpur		—	—	
NH 19	199.8	124.1	Bihar Border - Chauparan - Barhi - Barakatha - Bagodar - Dumri - Topchanchi - Gobindpur - Nirsa - West Bengal Border		—	—	
NH 20	391.6	243.3	Bihar border- Kodarama-Barhi (NH-2) - Hazaribag - Ramgarh - Ranchi--Khunti - Murhu - Bandgaon - Chakraharpur - Chaibasa - Jayantgarh - Odisha border		—	—	
NH 22	106	66	Chandwa - Balumath - Chatra - Hunterganj - Bihar Border		—	—	
NH 33	92.9	57.7	Bihar Border - Sahibganj - Talihari - Tinpahar - Rajmahal - Barharwa - West Bengal Border		—	—	
NH 39	261	162	U.P. Border - Nagar untari - Garhwa - Daltenganj - Latehar - Chandwa - Kuru - Mandar - Ranchi		—	—	
NH 43	274	170	Chhattisgarh Border - Raidih - Gumla- Ranchi-Bundu- Chandil- Manikul- Saraikela - Chaibasa (NH-20)		—	—	
NH 49	23.6	14.7	Odisha Border - Baharagora - W.B. Border		—	—	
NH 114A	298	185	Dumri - Giridih - Madhupur Sarath - Deoghar - Choupa More - Jarmundi - Jamua - Lakrapahari - Dumka - Shikaripara - West Bengal Border		—	—	
NH 118	17	11	Junction with NH-18 near Asanbani connecting Jamshedpur		—	—	
NH 133	123	76	Bihar border - Godda - Choupa More on NH-114A		—	—	
NH 133A	25	16	Baharwa -Pakur - West Bengal Border		—	—	
NH 133B	11	6.8	Sahibgang (NH-33)- Bihar Border		—	—	
NH 139	55.4	34.4	Bihar Border - Hariharganj - Chhatarpur - Rajhara (NH-75)		—	—	
NH 143	122	76	Gumla - Palkot - Kolebira - Simdega - Thethaitanagar - Odisha Border		—	—	
NH 143A	71	44	Gumla -Ghaghra- Lohardaga -Kuru (NH-39)		—	—	
NH 143AG	134.5	83.6	The highway starting from its junction with NH- 143A Near Lohardaga connecting Bhandra, Bero, Karra, Khunti and terminating at its junction with NH-43 near Tamar in the State of Jharkhand..		—	—	
NH 143B	52.8	32.8	The highway starting from its junction with NH-43 near Jashpurnagar in the state of Chhattisgarh connecting Gobindpur, Dumri and terminating near Mahuandanr in the State of Jharkhand.		—	—	
NH 143D	81.7	50.8	The highway starting from its junction with NH-143 near Jamtoli connecting Basia, Kamadara, Torpa and terminating at its junction with NH-20 near Khunthi in the State of Jharkhand.		—	—	
NH 143H	6.5	4.0	The highway starting from its junction with NH-143 near Joram connecting Ambapani in the state of Odisha further connecting Salangabahal, Bihabandh and terminating at Litebeda in the State of Jharkhand.		—	—	
NH 218	44.4	27.6	The highway starting from its junction with NH-18 near Purulia in the state of West Bengal connecting Chandakyari, Jhariya and terminating at its junction with NH- 18 near Dhanbad in the State of Jharkhand.		—	—	
NH 220	54	34	Chaibasa (NH-1)- Gobindpur - Hata - Odisha border		—	—	
NH 320	80.3	49.9	Ramgarh-Gola-Chas		—	—	
NH 320D	99.7	62.0	The highway starting from its junction with NH-20 near Chakradharpur connecting Sonua, Goelkera, Manoharpur, Jaraikela in the state of Jharkhand and terminating at its junction with NH- 143 (Raurkela Bypass) in the state of Odisha.		—	—	
NH 320G	180	110	The highway starting from its junction with NH-20 near Hat Gamaria connecting Jagannathpur, Baraiburu, Saddle, Manoharpur, Anandpur, Bano and terminating at its junction with NH- 143 near Kolebira in the state of Jharkhand..		—	—	
NH 333	20	12	Bihar Border - Devgarh		—	—	
NH 333A	97.5	60.6	The highway starting from its junction with NH-33 near Bar Bigha connecting Shekhpura, Sikandra, Jamui, Jha- Jha, Banka in the State of Bihar, Godda, Suderpahari, Litipara and terminating at its junction with NH-133A near Pakur in the State of Jharkhand.		—	—	
NH 343	48.5	30.1	Chhattisgarh border - Ranka Kalan - Garhwa (NH-75)		—	—	
NH 419	60	37	Chittaranjan- Jamtara -Gobindpur		—	—	
NH 522	120	75	Chatra - Simariya - Udaipur - Hazaribagh - Meru - Daru - Kharika - Bagodar		—	—	

== Karnataka ==
Number	Length (km)	Length (mi)	Southern or western terminus	Northern or eastern terminus	Formed	Removed	Notes
NH 42	4.4	2.7	(NH63) NH 67 near Joladaraashi, Andrapradesh Border		—	—	
NH 44	134.02	83.28	Andhra Pradesh border - - Chikkaballapur- - Bangalore - Tamil Nadu border		—	—	
NH 48	699.58	434.70	Maharashtra Border - Belgam, Hubli, Chitradurga, Tumakuru, (old NH7) Bengaluru, - Andhra Pradesh border		—	—	
NH 648	130.13	80.86	(NH207) NH 48 near Nelamangla, Dodaballapur, Devenhalli (NH44), Sarajpur, Bagalur, NH 48 near Hosur		—	—	
NH 748	84.12	52.27	(NH4A) NH 48 near Belgaum, Anmod, Panda, NH 66 near Panaji		—	—	
NH 948	203.52	126.46	Tamil Nadu Border - Punjur - Chamrajnagar - Yelandur - Kollegal - Malavalli - Sathnur - Kanakaapura - Bangalore		—	—	
NH 50	544	338	Bidar, Homanabad near (NH218) NH 65, Gulbarga, Jevargi, (NH13) Bijapur, Hospet, NH 48 in Chitradurga.		—	—	
NH 150	137	85	NH 50 near Gulbarga, Yadagiri, NH 167 near Devasuguru		—	—	
NH 150A	618	384	NH 50 near Jewargi, Shahapur, Surpur, Lingasugur, Sindhanur, Siruguppa, Bellary, Challakere, Hiriyur, Chikkanayakanahalli, K.B.Cross, Nagamangala, Srirangapatna, Mysore, Nanjangud, NH - 948 near Chamarajnagar		—	—	
NH 150E	73	45	NH - 50 near Gulbarga, Chowdapur, Afzalpur, Maharashtra border		—	—	
NH 52	401	249	NH - 66 near Ankola, Hubli, Bijapura, Maharashtra border		—	—	
NH 65	75.01	46.61	Telangana border to Maharashtra border via Homanabad (NH - 9)		—	—	
NH 66	301.1	187.1	(NH17)Goa border Karwar, Honavar, Udupi, Mangalore, Kerala border		—	—	
NH 766	151	94	(NH212) Kerala border, Gundlulpet, Mysore, NH 948 near Kollegal		—	—	
NH 766C	198	123	Junction with NH - 66 near Byndur (Baindur) connecting Kollur, Hosanagara, Anandapura, Ananthapura, Shikarpur, Masur and terminating at its junction with NH - 48 near Ranibennur		—	—	
NH 67	265	165	Hubli(NH 48), Gadag, Koppal, Hosapete (NH 50), Bellary(NH 150A), KA/AP border		—	—	
NH 367	157	98	NH 67 near Bhanapur, Kukunur, Yelburga, Gajendragad, Badami, Guledagudda, Bagalkot, NH 52 near Gadankeri		—	—	
NH 367A	28.73	17.85	(NH 67) Koppal, Irkalgada, Methagal(NH 50)		—	—	
NH 167	71.4	44.4	NH 67 near Bellary karekal, AP border		—	—	
NH 69	545	339	(NH206) NH 66 near Honnavar, Shimoga, (NH234) Banavar, Hulyar, Sira, Madhugiri, Chintamani, (NH4) Mulbagal,		—	—	
NH 169	215	134	(NH13) NH 69 near Shimoga, Tirthahalli, Kopa, Karkal, NH 66 near Mangalore		—	—	
NH 169A	87	54	NH - 169 near Thirthahali, Agumbe, Hebri, NH - 66 near Udupi		—	—	
NH 369	105	65	(NH13) NH 69 near Shimoga, Channagiri, Holalkere, NH 48 near Chitradurga		—	—	
NH 73	316	196	(NH234) NH 66 near Mangaluru, Beluru, Halebeedu, Javagal, (NH206) Banavara, Arasikere, Tiptur, Nittur, NH 48 near Tumakuru		—	—	
NH 173	72	45	NH73 near Mudigere, Chikmagalur, NH69 near Kadur		—	—	
NH 75	453	281	(NH48) NH 73 near Bantval, Hassan, (NH4) Nelamangala, Bengaluru, Kolar, (NH234) Mulbagal		—	—	
NH 275	367	228	NH - 75 near Bantwal, Puttur, Sullia, Madikeri, Kushalanagar, Bylakuppe, Hunsur, Mysuru, Srirangapatna, Mandya, Ramanagara, Kengeri, Nayandahalli NH75 near Bengaluru (Bangalore)		—	—	
NH 181	26.01	16.16	NH - 766 near Gundlupet to Tamil Nadu border		—	—	
NH 948A	185	115	NH - 48 near Dabaspete, Soluru, Magadi, Chowdanakuppe, Doddagangawadi gate, Ramanagara, Kanakapura, Tally, Hosuru, NH648 near Hosuru (Tamil Nadu)		—	—	
NH 161A	507	315	Akot, Akola, Barshitakli, Mangrulpir, Manora, Digras, Arni, Mahur, Kinwat, Himayatnagar, Mudkhed, Waghala, Mukhed, Aurad, Bidar		—	—	

== Kerala ==
Number	Length (km)	Length (mi)	Southern or western terminus	Northern or eastern terminus	Formed	Removed	Notes
NH 66	669.437	415.969	Thalapadi	Kaliyakkavila	—	—	5828181
NH 85	167.61	104.15	Bodimettu	Kundannoor	—	—	5830968
NH 183	190.3	118.2	Kollam	Kumily	—	—	5830952
NH 183A	145	90	Kollam Titanium Jn. (Panmana)	Vandiperiyar	—	—	5830954
NH 185	98	61	Adimali	Kumily	—	—	5830973
NH 544	160	99	Valayar	Edappally	—	—	5804290
NH 744	81.28	50.51	Kollam	Kazhuthuritty	—	—	5804338
NH 766	117.6	73.1	Kozhikode	Muthanga	—	—	5828352
NH 966	125.304	77.860	Ferokh	Palakkad	—	—	5828374
NH 966A	17	11	Kalamassery	Vallarpadam	—	—	5828385
NH 966B	5.92	3.68	Kundannoor	Willington Island	—	—	5828387

== Madhya Pradesh ==
Number	Length (km)	Length (mi)	Southern or western terminus	Northern or eastern terminus	Formed	Removed	Notes
NH 27	121.9	75.7	Rajasthan Border/Rajasthan border - Kota - Kolras - Karera - Shivpuri - UP border// Shivpuri - Karera - UP Border		—	—	
NH 30	493.7	306.8	UP Border - Mangawan, Rewa, Katni, Jabalpur (excluding Jabalpur to Damoh) Section 101 Km), Mandla-CG Border		—	—	
NH 34	369	229	Uttar Pradesh Border- Chattarpur, Hirapur, Damoh, Jabalpur - junction with NH-44 near Lakhnadon		—	—	
NH 39	392.8	244.1	UP border - Alipura - Nowgaon - Chhatarpur - Ganj - Panna - Baroura - Nagod - Satna - Madhogarh - Rewa (NH-7): Churhat - Sidhi - Deosar - Sohar - Singroli - UP border		—	—	
NH 43	435.5	270.6	Junction with NH-34 near Gulganj - Amanganj, Pawai, Katni, Umaria, Shahdol-Chhattisgarh Border		—	—	
NH 44	571.9	355.4	Uttar Pradesh Border-Sagar, Narsmhapur, Lakhnadon - Seoni-Maharashtra Border		—	—	
NH 45	495.2	307.7	Amarkantak- dindori-shahpura-Jabalpur - Shahpura - Deori - Bareli - Bari - Goharganj - Obaidullaganj - Bhopal - Duraha - Shampur - Narsinghgarh		—	—	
NH 46	634	394	Junction with NH-44 near Gwalior in the State of Madhya Pradesh, Shivpuri, Guna, Biora, Bhopal, Obeddullaganj, Narmadapuram -junction with NH-47 at Betul		—	—	
NH 47	558.6	347.1	Gujarat Border - Jhabua - Rama - Rajgarh - Bhandheri - Dhar - Ghat Bilod - Betma - Indore - Chapra - Kannod - Khategaon - Nemawar - Handia - Harda - Sodalpur - Bori - Chirapatla - Chicholi - Betul- Multai - Tigaon - Pandhurna - Chicholi - Maharashtra Border		—	—	
NH 52	454.2	282.2	Rajasthan Border- Rajgarh, Biora, Sarangpur - Shajapur - Dewas - Indore - Mhow - Thikri - Julwania - Sendhwa - Maharashtra Border		—	—	
NH 56	52	32	Gujarat border - Bhabra - Alirajpur[excluding Alirajpur-chandpur-Jobat Section ] - Gujrat border		—	—	
NH 135	65.4	40.6	Uttar Pradesh Border- its junction with NH-30 near Mangawan		—	—	
NH 146	167.6	104.1	Junction with NH-46 near Bhopal - Vidisha - junction with NH-44 near Sagar		—	—	
NH 339	15	9.3	The highway starting from its junction with NH-39 near Nowgong in the State of Madhya Pradesh and terminating at its junction with NH-34 near Srinagar in the State of Uttar Pradesh.		—	—	
NH 346	222	138	Junction with NH-46 near Jharkheda - Berasia, Vidisha, Kurwai, Mungawali -Chanderi.		—	—	
NH 347	152.3	94.6	Junction with NH-47 near Multai connecting Chikhli, Dunawa, Chhindwara, Chaurai and terminating at its junction with NH-44 near Seoni in the state of Madhya Pradesh.		—	—	
NH 539	150	93	UP Border - Orchha - Pithipur - Tikamgarh - Shahgarh		—	—	
NH 543	359	223	Junction with NH-43 near Shahdol - Dindori, Mandla, Nainpur, Lamta - Balaghat -Maharashtra Border		—	—	
NH 547	267	166	Narsinghpur (NH-26) - Harrrari - Amarwada - Chhindwara - Saunsar - Maharashtra border		—	—	
NH 552	402	250	Rajasthan Border- Sheopur, Goras, Shampur, Sabalgarh, Morena, Porsa, Ater, Bhind (excluding stretch from Bhind to Mihona) Mihona, Bhander-Uttar Pradesh Border		—	—	
NH 719	108	67	UP Border - Phup Kolan - Bhind - Mahgawan - Gwalior		—	—	
NH 934	170.4	105.9	Junction with NH-34 near Hirapur connecting Banda, Sagar, Jeruwakhera, Khurai - Bina		—	—	
NH 943	70	43	Junction with NH-43 near Pawai co-nnecting Saleha (Jaso) Jassu - junction with NH-39 near Nagod		—	—	
NH 135B	80	50	Uttar Pradesh Border- Dabhoura, Sirmaur -junction with NH-39 near Rewa		—	—	
NH 135BB	7.5	4.7	Junction with NH-35 (Bargarh More) near Jamira - Bargarh, Gahur in the state of Uttar Pradesh connecting Dubi, Magdaur - junction with NH-135B near Dabhoura		—	—	
NH 135BD	36	22	Junction with NH-135B near Sirmaur, Kolha, Rajgarh, Kyoti, Bagahaiya, Lalgaon, Pangadi -junction with NH-30 near Kalwari		—	—	
NH 135BG	121.4	75.4	Uttar Pradesh Border - Majhgawa, Satna - junction with NH-30 near Maihar		—	—	
NH 135C	72	45	Uttar Pradesh Border- Awadhadam, Pipra, Manigarha, Karondiya, Bagdara, Chtrangi, Singrauli and terminating at its junction with NH-39 near Waidhan		—	—	
NH 146B	50	31	Junction with NH-46 near Budhni - Kosmi, Rehti -Nasrullahganj		—	—	
NH 147E	34	21	Junction with NH- 47 near Jhabua (Bypass) - Nawagaon - Raipuriya		—	—	
NH 148N	255	158	The highway starting from its junction with NH-48 near Dodka (Vadodara) connecting Godhra, Dahod in the state of Gujarat, Ratlam, Jaora in the state of Madhya Pradesh, Jhalawar, Kota, Sawai Madhopur, Lalsot, Dausa in the state of Rajasthan, Firozpur Jhirka and terminating at its junction with NH-248A near Sohna in the state of Haryana.		—	—	
NH 161G	20	12	Jamod in the state of Maharashtra- junction with NH- 930 near Khaknar		—	—	
NH 339B	9	5.6	Junction with NH No.-39 at Bamitha -Khajuraho		—	—	
NH 347A	23	14	junction with NH-47 near Multai in the State of Madhya Pradesh -Maharashtra Border		—	—	
NH 347B	287	178	Junction with NH-47 near Kheri - Asapur (excluding strtech from Ashapur to Khandwa) Khandwa, Chhegaon Makhan (excluding stretch from Chhegaon Makhan to Deshgaon ) Deshgaon, Khargon, Julwania, Thikri, Anjad- Barwani		—	—	
NH 347BG	106	66	The highway starting from its junction with NH-347B near Deshgaon connecting Sanawad, Barwah and terminating at its junction with NH-52 (Bhawarkua Chowk) at Indore in the state of Madhya Pradesh.		—	—	
NH 347C	201	125	Junction with NH-47 near Dhar - Gujri, Kalghat, Kasarwad, Khargaon, Bistan, Baner in the state of Madhya Pradesh Palpadlya, Raver in the state of Maharashtra - Burhanpur in the state of Madhya Pradesh.		—	—	
NH 548C	78	48	Wadgaon in the State of Maharashtra - junction with NH-47 near Baitul		—	—	
NH 552G	192	119	The highway starting from its junction with NH-52 near Jhalarapatan connecting Beenda, Dawal in the state of Rajasthan further connecting Soyat, Susner, Agar, Ghosla, Ghatia and terminating at Ujjain in the state of Madhya Pradesh.		—	—	
NH 752B	151	94	Rajasthan/Madhya Pradesh Border - Susner, Khilchipur, Biaora on NH-52, Maksundangarh -Sironj		—	—	
NH 752C	139	86	Junction with NH-752B near Zirapur - (Pacher) Pachor, Shujalpur-Ashta		—	—	
NH 752G	53	33	junction with NH-52 near Sendwa-Khetia in the State of Madhya Pradesh, Shahada, Prakasha-Maharashtra Border		—	—	
NH 753L	93	58	Muktainagar in the state of Maharashtra = Burhanpur -Junction with NH-347B near Khandwa		—	—	
NH 927A	37	23	Ratlam [excluding Ratlam to Rajasthan/MP Border near Banswara] - Rajasthan Border.		—	—	

== Maharashtra ==
Number	Length (km)	Length (mi)	Southern or western terminus	Northern or eastern terminus	Formed	Removed	Notes
NH 44	268.4	166.8	MP Border - Bandra - Mansar - Nagpur - Butibori - Sonegaon - Jamb - Hinganghat - Wadner - Pohna - Wadki - Kinhi - Pandharkawada - Bori - Andhra Pradesh Border.		—	—	
NH 47	59.0	36.7	Nagpur - Koradi - Saoner - MP Border		—	—	
NH 48	501.0	311.3	Gujarat Border - Amgaon - Talasar - Karakhu - Mandvi - Thane - Boriyali - Malad - Andheri - Greater Mumbai-Thane - Mumbra - Panvel - Chauk - Lonavla - Pune - Khed - Bhatgaon - Khandla - Satara - Valase - Borgaon - Umbraj - Karad - Itakare - Wadgaon - Kolhapur - Kagal - Karnataka Border		—	—	
NH 50	110.0	68.4	Junction with new NH No.-161 at Nanded in the state of Maharasthra- Karnataka Border		—	—	
NH 52	573.4	356.3	Karnataka Border-Nanandi-Hattur-Solapur - Tuljapur - Osmanabad - Terkhed - Samarkundi - Pali - Beed - Pachegaon - Gevrai - Warigodri - Adul - Aurangabad - Daulatabad - Khuldabad - Ellora - Kannad - Bhamarvadi - Chalisgaon - Vinchur - Dhule-Songir-Nardana-Shivpur0Sangvi-MP Border		—	—	
NH 53	797.0	495.2	Gujarat Border - Navapur - Visarwadi - Kondaibari - Sakri - Shevali - Kusumbe - Dhule - Parola - Erandol - Varad - Jalgaon - Bhusawal - Edalabad - Malkapur - Nandura - Khamgaon - Balapur - Akola - Murtazpur - Amravati - Nandgaon - Panjara - Nagpur - Bhandara - Lakhni - Sakoli - Duggipar - Deori - Chhattisgarh Border		—	—	
NH 60	360.6	224.1	Junction with NH-53 near Dhule - Arvi - Malegaon - Saundane - Chandvad - Ojhar - Nashik, Nashik - Sinnar - Sangamner - Ale - Bote - Pimpalwandi - Narayangaon - Peth - Khed - Chakan - junction with NH-48 near Pune		—	—	
NH 61	605.7	376.4	Kalyan (NH-3) - Murbad - - Alephata - Ahmadnagar - Pathardi - Yeli - Gevrai - Majalgaon - Pathri - Prabhani - Nanded - Bhokar - Andhra Pradesh Border		—	—	
NH 63	293.1	182.1	Junction with NH-548C near Barshi and connecting to Yedshi, Dhoki, Murud, Latur, Renapur, Nalegaon, Dighoi, Udgir, Deglur, Adampur, Khatgoan, Sagroli-Telangana Border-//Telangana Border-, Sironcha-Chhattisgarh Border		—	—	
NH 65	349.2	217.0	Pune - Loni Kalbhor - Yevat - Bhigvan - Indapur - Tembhurni - Varawadi - Mohol - Solapur - Naldurg - Yenugur - Umarga - Andhra Pradesh Border.		—	—	
NH 66	475.2	295.3	Panvel - Pen - Negothane - Indapur - Kolad - Mangaon - Dasgaon - Mahad - Ambavli - Poladpur - Khed - Asurda - Ankhali - Udgi - Lanja - Vaked - Rajpura - Wargaon - Nandgaon - Kankavli - Kasal - Vengurla - Goa Border		—	—	
NH 130D	84.0	52.2	Chhattisgarh Border- Bingunda, Laheri, Dhodraj, Bhamragard, Hemalkasa - junction with NH-353C near Allapalli		—	—	
NH 150	69.0	42.9	Dudhani- Akkalkote- Sholapur (new NH-52)		—	—	
NH 160	440.2	273.5	Junction with NH-60 near Sinnar - Shirdi, Ahmadnagar, Kolgaon, Daund, Phaltan, Dahiwandi, Vita, Tasgaon, Miraj - Chikhodi -junction with NH-48		—	—	
NH 160A	170.0	105.6	The Highway starting from its junction with NH-60 near Sinner connecting Ghoti, Trimbakeshwar, Mokhada, Jawhar, Vikramgad, Manor near NH48 and terminating at Palghar in the state of Maharashtra.		—	—	
NH 160B	7.0	4.3	The highway starting from its junction with NH-160 near Zagade Phata and terminating at its junction with NH-752G near Kopargaon in the state Maharshtra.		—	—	
NH 160C	26.2	16.3	The Highway starting from its junction with NH-160 near Rahuri and terminating at its junction with NH-753 near Shani Shinganapur in the state of Maharashtra.		—	—	
NH 160D	48.0	29.8	The highway starting from its junction with NH-60 near Nandur Shingote connecting Dighe, Talegaon, Loni and terminating at its junction with NH-160 near Kolhar in the state Maharshtra.		—	—	
NH 160H	124.0	77.1	The Highway starting from its junction with NH-60 near Malegaon connecting to Chaugaon, Kusumbe, Mehargaon, Khwathi, Lamkhani, Shewade, Dondaicha, Sarangkheda, Sawalde and terminating at its junction with NH-752G near Shahada in the state of Maharashtra.		—	—	
NH 161	290.7	180.6	Akola on NH-53 connecting Washim, Hingoli, Nanded, Diglur-AP Border		—	—	
NH 161A	489.4	304.1	Junction with NH-548C Akot, Patsul, Bhod- Akola, Barshi Takli, Shelu bazaar, Mangrulpir, Manora, Digras, Arni, Dhanoda (Overlap), Mahur, Sarkhani, Kinvat, Islapur, Himayatnagar, Bhokar, Mudkhed (Overlap), Nanded, Osmanpur, Kautha, Mukhed, Barhali, Mukrabad, Lakhmapur, Sawarmal, Nangarga, vazzar -junction with NH-161C near Aurad		—	—	
NH 161E	113.0	70.2	Junction with NH-161 near Washim - Bhoyar, Shelgaon, Mangrulpir, Poghat, Karanja, Kamargaon -Hivra Bk on NH- 53		—	—	
NH 161G	134.2	83.4	The highway starting from its junction with NH-161 near Patur connecting Balapur, Shegaon, Sangrampur, Jalgaon Jamod in the state of Maharashtra and terminating at its junction with NH- 930 near Khaknar in the state of Madhya Pradesh.		—	—	
NH 161H	28.0	17.4	Junction with NH-161G near Jalgaon Jamod - junction with NH-53 near Nandura		—	—	
NH 166	369.8	229.8	Ratnagiri - Tink - Pali - Sakharpa - Malkapur - Shahuwadi - Kolhapur on NH-48 - Miraj - Sangole - Solapur.		—	—	
NH 166A	29.0	18.0	Vadkhal (NH-66) - Alibag		—	—	
NH 166D	33.3	20.7	The Highway starting from its junction with NH-66 near Pen and connecting to Ransai and terminating at its junction with NH-548A near Madh (Mahad Ashtvinayak) in the state of Maharashtra.		—	—	
NH 166E	289.4	179.8	Junction with NH-166C near Guhagar - Chiplun, Patan, Karad, Kadegaon, Vita, Khanapur, Nagaj, Jat -Karanataka Border.		—	—	
NH 166F	25.6	15.9	The Highway starting from its junction with NH-66 near Mahad and terminating at Raigad Fort in the state of Maharashtra.		—	—	
NH 166G	84.0	52.2	The Highway starting from its junction with NH-66 near Talere (Talera) connecting Vaibhavawadi, Gaganbawada (Bavda) and terminating at its junction with NH-48 near Kolhapur in the state of Maharashtra.		—	—	
NH 166H	55.0	34.2	The Highway starting from its junction with NH-166 near Sangli and terminating at its junction with NH- 48 near Peth Naka in the state of Maharashtra.		—	—	
NH 247	195.0	121.2	Junction with NH-47 near Dahegaon - Kamthi, Kuhi, Umred, Bhiwapur, Paoni, Adhyal, Pahela, Bhandara- junction with NH-753 near Ramtek		—	—	
NH 266	166.0	103.1	Jat on NH-166E - Jat, Kavathe Mahnkal, Shirdhona, Tasgaon, Palus - Karad on NH-166E		—	—	
NH 347A	231.0	143.5	Junction with NH-47 near Multai - Warud, Ashti, Arvi, Pulgaon, Wardha, Sevagram, Sonegaon, Hinganghat, Jamb - junction with NH-930 near Warora		—	—	
NH 347C	36.0	22.4	Junction with NH-47 near Dhar - Gujri, Kalghat, Kasarwad, Khargaon, Bistan, Baner in the state of Madhya Pradesh Palpadlya, Raver-Madhya Pradesh Border.		—	—	
NH 348	38.0	23.6	Junction with NH-48 near Palspe - JNPT		—	—	
NH 348A	17.0	10.6	Junction with NH-348 near Jawahar Lal Nehru Port Trust - Gavanphata section of SH-54 (Km. 5.300 to Km. 14.550), Amara Marg (Km. 0.000 to Km. 6.500) -junction with Palm Beach Road		—	—	
NH 348B	20.0	12.4	The highway starting from its junction with NH-348 near Ulwe (Padeghar) connecting Hambhulpad, Kauli Belodak, Chirner, Sai and terminating at its junction with NH-66 near Raigad (Barapada) in the state of Maharashtra.		—	—	
NH 348BB	6.5	4.0	The highway starting from its junction with new NH-348B near Chirner connecting Koproli and terminating at Khopta Creek in the state of Maharashtra.		—	—	
NH 353B	108.0	67.1	Telangana border- Korpana, Vansadi, Gadchandur, Bamawada, Rajura, Gondpimpri -junction with NH-353C near Ashti		—	—	
NH 353C	325.0	201.9	junction with NH-53 near Sakoli - Warda, Armori, Gadchiroli, Chamorsi, Ashti, Allapalli, Repanpalli, Sironcha		—	—	
NH 353D	137.0	85.1	Junction with NH-53 near Nagpur - Umred, Nagbhir, Brahmapuri -junction with NH-353C near Armori		—	—	
NH 353E	90.0	55.9	Junction with NH- 353D at Umred - Bhisi Chimur, Anandvan -Warora (Waroda)		—	—	
NH 353I	72.5	45.0	Junction with NH-53 near Wadi - Hingana, T point, Essasani, Mihan, Outer Ring road, Gumgaon, Gumgaon, Salaidhabha, Butibori MIDC, Takalghat, Kapri Moreshwar, Asola, Dry Port at Sindi Railway - junction with NH-361 near Pavnar		—	—	
NH 353J	172.0	106.9	Junction with NH-53 near Nagpur - Kalmeshwar, Katol, Bharsingi, Jalaikheda, Warud, Chandur Bazar, Achalpur - Paratwada on NH-548C		—	—	
NH 353K	95.7	59.5	Junction with NH-53 near Nandgaon Peth - Shirkhed, Morshi -junction with NH-347A near Warud		—	—	
NH 361	478.6	297.4	Solapur - Nanded - Yavatmal - Boti Bori on NH-44		—	—	
NH 361B	77.5	48.2	Junction with NH-361 near Kalamb road -Ralegaon - Kapsi -Sirasgaon -Vadner - junction with NH-44 near Wadki		—	—	
NH 361C	88.5	55.0	Junction with NH-361 near Digras- Donad, Darwha, Karanja, Mozor - junction with NH-53 near Murtijapur		—	—	
NH 361F	220.0	136.7	The Highway starting from its juinction with NH-361 near Loha connecting Palam, Gangakhed, Parli Vaijnath, Telgaon, Wadvani, Beed, Arvi and terminating at Kharwandi in the state of Maharashtra.		—	—	
NH 361H	52.8	32.8	Junction with NH-752F near Parali Vaijnath - Dharmapuri, Pangaon - Renapur Phata		—	—	
NH 461B	97.5	60.6	The Highway starting from its junction with NH-161 near Hingoli connecting Narsi-Namdev, Sengaon, Sakhara, Risod and terminating at its junction with NH-161 near Malegaon in the state of Maharashtra.		—	—	
NH 465	105.6	65.6	The Highway starting from its junction with NH-65 near Mohol connecting Kurul, Kamthi, Mandrup, Walsang and Terminating at its junction with NH-65 near Tandulwadi in the state of Maharashtra.		—	—	
NH 543	204.0	126.8	Madhya Pradesh Border- Rajegaon, Dhamangaon, Rawandi, Gondia, Amgaon, Deori, Korchi, Kurkheda, Wadsa (Desaiganj - junction with NH-353D near Bramhapuri		—	—	
NH 547	13.0	8.1	MP border - junction with NH-47 near Saoner		—	—	
NH 547E	35.0	21.7	junction with NH-48 near Saoner - Dhapewada, Kalmeshwar -junction with NH-53 near Gondakheri		—	—	
NH 548	36.9	22.9	Junction with NH- 48 near Kalamboli - junction with NH-348 near km 5.67		—	—	
NH 548A	168.0	104.4	Junction with NH-848A near Shahapur -Murbad, Karjat, Khalapur, Pali, Tale, Manmad - Agardanda		—	—	
NH 548B	404.0	251.0	Junction with NH-548C near Mantha - Deogoan Fata, Selu, Pathari, Sonpeth, Parali Vaijnath, Ambajogai, Renapurphata, Latur (NH-361), Ausa, Omarga, Yenegur, Murum, Alur, Akkalkot, Nagasur -junction with NH-52 near Bijapur (Vijapur)		—	—	
NH 548C	589.8	366.5	Junction with NH-48 near Satara-Koregaon, Mhaswad, Malshiras, Akluj – Tembhurni – Kurudwadi, Barshi, Yermala, Kalamb, Kaij, Dharur, Majalgaon – Partur – Watur – Mantha – Lonar – Mehkar – Janephal – Khamgaon – Shegaon – Akot – Anjangaon – Wadgaon - junction with NH-47 near Baitul		—	—	
NH 548CC	101.4	63.0	Junction with NH-548C near Mantha - Lonar, Mehkar, Chikhali -junction with NH-53 near Khamgaon		—	—	
NH 548D	391.9	243.5	Junction with NH-48 near Talegaon Dabhade- Chakan, Shikrapur, Nhavare, Srigonda, Jalgaon, Jamkhed, Patoda, Manjarsumba, Kaij, Ambajogai, Kingaon -Junction with NH-361 at Ahmedpur		—	—	
NH 548DD	44.4	27.6	The Highway starting from its junction with NH-48 near Vadgaon connecting to Katraj, Kondwa, Undri, (Mantarwadi Chowk), Vadki, Loni-Kalbhor, Theurphata, Kesanand and terminating at junction of NH-753F near Lonikand in the State of Maharashtra.		—	—	
NH 548E	53.1	33.0	Junction with NH-548C near Mhasvad- Piliv - junction with NH-965 near Pandharpur		—	—	
NH 548H	90.0	55.9	The highway starting from its junction with NH-48 near Sankeshwar in the state of Karnataka, Gadhinglaj, Ajara, Amboli, Madkhol, Sawantwadi, Insuli and terminating at its junction with NH-66 near Banda in the state of Maharshtra.		—	—	
NH 561	75.4	46.9	Junction with NH-61 near Ahmednagar - Ashti, Chinkodi, Patil Kada, Rajuri, -junction with NH-548D near Jamkhed		—	—	
NH 561	35.0	21.7	Junction with NH-548D near Tamba Rajuri, Otherla, Pitthi, Shirapur - junction with NH-52 near Beed		—	—	
NH 561A	235.5	146.3	Junction with NH-61 near Ahmednagar - Karmala, Tembhurni, Parite, Karkamb, Pandharpur, Mangalwedha- Karnataka Border.		—	—	
NH 647	53.7	33.4	The Highway starting from its junction with NH-347A near Arvi connecting to Pimpalsuta, Kharangna, Anji, Pavnar and terminating at its junction with NH-347A near Wardha in the state of Maharashtra.		—	—	
NH 652	70.7	43.9	The Highway starting from its junction with NH-52 near Tuljapur connecting to Andur, Naldurg, Hannur and terminating at its junction with NH-150 near Akkalkot in the state of Maharashtra.		—	—	
NH 752E	161.2	100.2	Junction with NH-52 (Beed Bypass) near Aurangabad - Bidkin, Dhorkin, Paithan, Mungi, Bodhegaon, Ghoanaspargaon, Ukhanda Chakla, Midsangvi, Shirur Kasar, Rakshasbhuwan, Kholyachiwadi, Kharegaon, Dongarkinhi, Chumbli, Patoda, Pargaon, Ghumbra, Gighol - Kharad		—	—	
NH 752G	350.8	218.0	Junction with NH-53 near Sendwa - Khetia in the state of Madhya Pradesh, Shahada, Prakasha, Nandurbar, Visarwadi, Sakri, Satana, Deola, Chandvad, Manmad, Yeola, Kopargaon -junction with NH-160 near Shirdi		—	—	
NH 752H	202.0	125.5	Junction with NH-752G near Yevla -Andarsul Rotegaon, Shivur, Devgaon Ranagari, Dewashi, Daultabad, Khultabad, Phulambri Dabhadi, Rajur -junction with NH-753A near Deulgaon		—	—	
NH 752I	406.5	252.6	Junction with NH-752G near Kopargaon -Vaijapur, Lasur, Aurangabad, Jalana Watur, Mantha, Jintur, Aunda Nagnath, Basmat, Ardhapur, Tamsa, Himayatnagar, Dhanki Phulsawangi, Mahur -junction with NH-361 near Dhanoda		—	—	
NH 752K	223.6	138.9	Junction with NH-752I near Jintur - Bori, Zari, Parbhani, Gangakhed, Isad, Kingaon, Dhanora, Wadval, Nagnath, Gharani, Nalegoan, Latur, Nitur, Nilanga, Sirshi, Aurad Shajani -Karnataka Border.		—	—	
NH 753	208.0	129.2	Junction with NH-53 near Duggipar - Goregaon, Gondia, Tirora, Tumsar, Usara, Jamb, Shiv, Ramtek, Parsheoni, Khapa-junction with NH-47 near Savner		—	—	
NH 753A	205.0	127.4	Malkapur- Buldhana- Chikhli- Deulgaon Raja- Jalna - Aurangabad		—	—	
NH 753AB	81.0	50.3	The highway starting from its junction with NH-753A at Shendra MIDC ROB connecting Bhalgaon, Ghadivat, Bidkin, Shendurvada, Bargaon and terminating near Kasab Kheda Phata at junction of proposed Aurangabad Bypass on NH-52 in the State of Maharashtra.		—	—	
NH 753B	108.0	67.1	Shevali- Nizampur- Chhadvel- Nundurbar- Taloda- Akkalkura- Gujarat Border		—	—	
NH 753BB	72.0	44.7	The Highway starting from its junction with NH-753B Nadurbar (Devmogra) connecting Ghotane, Dondaicha, Bamne, Chillane, Kasbe, Shindkheda and terminating at its junction with NH-52 near Songir Phata in the state of Maharashtra.		—	—	
NH 753C	285.5	177.4	The Highway starting from its junction with NH-753A (Jalna Bypass) connecting Sindhkhed Raja, Dusrabid, Bibi, Sultanpur, Mehkar, Dongaon, kenwad, Malegaon Jahangir, Shelu bazar, Karanja, Bramhankhed, Kherda, Pimpalgaon, Vaghoda, Dashasar, Talegaon and terminating at its junction with NH-347A near Pulgaon in the state of Maharashtra.		—	—	
NH 753E	100.8	62.6	Junction with NH-753F near Ajanta - Buldana - junction with NH-53 near Khamgaon		—	—	
NH 753F	538.8	334.8	Junction with NH-53 nea Jalgaon - Pahur, Ajanta, Sillod, Phulambri, Aurangabad, Newasa, Wadala Bahiroba, Ghodegaon, Ahmednagar, Shirur, Ranjangaon, Shikrapur, Pune, Paud, Mulshi, Tamhini, Nijampur, Mangaon, Mhasla - Dighi Port on NH-166C		—	—	
NH 753H	118.3	73.5	The Highway starting from NH-753F near Sillod and connecting to Bhokardan, Hasnabad, Rajur, Bawnepangri, Jalna, Ambad and terminating at its junction with NH-52 near Wadigodri (Warigodri) in the state of Maharashtra.		—	—	
NH 753J	235.0	146.0	Junction with NH-53 Jalgaon, Mehrun, Shiroli, Samner, Lasgaon, Pachora, Bhadgaon, Chalisgaon, Tambora, Nyaydongri, Pimperkhed, Nandgaon, Hisvahal -junction with NH-752G near Manmad		—	—	
NH 753L	158.0	98.2	Junction with NH-753F near Pahur - Jamner, Bodvad, Muktainagar-Madhya Pradesh Border.		—	—	
NH 753M	67.4	41.9	Junction with NH-753A near Chikhali- Dhad, Mahora, Bhokardan, Hasanbad - NH-752H		—	—	
NH 761	49.1	30.5	The Highway starting from its junction with NH-61 near Belhe and Connecting Alkuti, Devibhoyare, Nighoj and Terminating at its junction with NH-753F near Shirur in the state of Maharashtra.		—	—	
NH 848	206.0	128.0	Thane (NH-48) - Nasik - Peint - Gujarat border		—	—	
NH 848A	5.2	3.2	Union Territory of Dadra Nagar Haveli / Maharashtra Border - Sutrakar -junction with NH-48 near Talasari		—	—	
NH 930	280.0	174.0	Muramgaon- Dhanora- Gadchiroli- Mul- Chandrapur- Warora- Wani- Karanji (NH-44)		—	—	
NH 930D	63.0	39.1	Junction with NH-930 near Chandarpur - Visapur, Ballarpur, Bamni, Rajura, Warur, Dewada, Lakkdkot - Maharashtra / Telangana Border.		—	—	
NH 953	85.0	52.8	Savad- Vani -junction with NH-60 near Pimpalgaon Baswant.		—	—	
NH 965	277.0	172.1	Mohl on NH No.-65 -Pandharpur-Malshiras-Pjaltan-Nira-Jejuri-Saswad near Pune-Alandi near NH No.-60		—	—	
NH 965C	48.4	30.1	Junction with NH-965 near Pandharpur - Shetphal - junction with NH-548C near Kurudwadi		—	—	
NH 965D	95.0	59.0	The Highway starting from its junction with NH-65 near Kedagaon connecting Supe, Morgaon, Nira, Lonand, Wathar and terminating at its junction with NH-48 near Wade Phata (Satara) in the state of Maharashtra.		—	—	
NH 965DD	168.0	104.4	The highway starting from its junction with NH-965D near Lonand and connecting Andori, Shirwal, Bhor, Apti and terminsatin at Pune / Raigad District border in the state of Maharashtra.		—	—	
NH 965G	223.5	138.9	Junction with NH-65 near Patas, Baramati, Indapur, Akluj, Velapur, Sangola, Bhalwani, Kadlas -junction with NH- 166E near Jat		—	—	

== Manipur ==
Number	Length (km)	Length (mi)	Southern or western terminus	Northern or eastern terminus	Formed	Removed	Notes
NH 2	459.6	285.6	Nagaland Border - Maosongsang - Maram - Karong - Kangpokpi - Imphal and Churachandpur-Mizoram Border		—	—	
NH 29	11.6	7.2	Nagaland Border- terminating at its junction with NH-202 near Jessami		—	—	
NH 37	221.1	137.4	Junction with NH-2 near Imphal-Nungba -Oinamlong- Jiribam-Assam Border		—	—	
NH 102	107.0	66.5	Junction with NH-2 near Imphal - Thoubal - Wangling - Palel - Sibong - Moreh - Indo/Myanmar Border.		—	—	
NH 102A	321.0	199.5	From Tadubi on N.H 2 - Paomata, Ukhrul, Finchcorner, Phungyar Kasom Khullen, Kampang -junction with NH-102 near Thengnoupal		—	—	
NH 102B	183.0	113.7	Churachandpur on N.H-2 - Singhat, Sinzawl, Tuivai Road - Myanmar Road		—	—	
NH 102C	20.0	12.4	Palel (new NH No. 102)- Chandel		—	—	
NH 129A	108.0	67.1	Maram (NH-2) - Nagaland Border		—	—	
NH 137	65.0	40.4	Rengpang on N.H-37, Khongsang -Tamenglong (Tenglong)		—	—	
NH 137A	46.0	28.6	Wahengbam Leikai (Junction of Imphal - Mayang Imphal Road & Nh No. 37) -Hiyangthang-Wangol-Mayang Imphal- Wabagai-Kakching- junction with new NH no. 102 at Kakching Lamkhai		—	—	
NH 202	208.0	129.2	Nagaland Border- Jessami, Ukhrul and terminating at its junction with NH-2 near Imphal		—	—	

== Mizoram ==
Number	Length (km)	Length (mi)	Southern or western terminus	Northern or eastern terminus	Formed	Removed	Notes
NH 2	483.5	300.4	Manipur Border-Seling, Serchhip, Lawngtla -Tuipang		—	—	
NH 6	266.0	165.3	Assam Border- Shillong, Dhaleshwar, Kanpui, Aizawal, Selling, Lumtui, Khawthlir, Tuisen, Neihdawn, Champai - Zokhawthar		—	—	
NH 102B	140.0	87.0	Nagopa, Hliappui, Saichal - new NH No- 6 near Keifang		—	—	
NH 108	165.0	102.5	Tripura Border - Tukkalh - Mamit - Sairang - Aizawl		—	—	
NH 302	109.0	67.7	Lunglei - Theriat- Lunglei- Lungseni- Tuiehong - Demagiri		—	—	
NH 306	72.0	44.7	Junction with NH-6 near Kanpui-Assam Border		—	—	
NH 306A	60.0	37.3	Vairengte - Saiphai, Zonmun -junction with NH-2 near New Vertek		—	—	
NH 502	27.0	16.8	Junction with NH-2 near Venus Saddle-Saiha		—	—	
NH 502A	100.0	62.1	Lawngtlai - Myanmar Border (Kaladan road)		—	—	

== Meghalaya ==
Number	Length (km)	Length (mi)	Southern or western terminus	Northern or eastern terminus	Formed	Removed	Notes
NH 6	252.8	157.1	The highway starting from its junction with NH-27 near Jorabat in the State of Assam connecting Shillong, Dhaleshwar, Kanpui, Aizawal, Selling, Lumtui, Khawthlir, Tuisen, Neihdawn, Champai and terminating at Zokhawthar in the State of Mizoram.		—	—	
NH 106	93.1	57.8	The highway starting from its junction with NH-6 near Shillong and terminating at Nongstoin in the State of Meghalaya.		—	—	
NH 127B	361.0	224.3	Nongstoin	Phulbari, West Garo Hills	—	—	
NH 206	126.9	78.9	The highway starting from its junction with NH-6 near Jowai connecting Dauki and terminating at its junction with NH-106 near Mylliem in the State of Meghalaya.		—	—	
NH 217	321.8	200.0	Assam border- Tura, Dalu, Baghmara, Rongjeng-Damra-Assam Border		—	—	

== Nagaland ==
Number	Length (km)	Length (mi)	Southern or western terminus	Northern or eastern terminus	Formed	Removed	Notes
NH 2	270.5	168.1	Mokokchung	Wokha	—	—	
NH 29	202.9	126.1	Dimapur	Chizami, Phek District	—	—	
NH 129	1.8	1.1	Dimapur	Dimapur	—	—	
NH 129A	71.0	44.1	Peren	Dimapur	—	—	
NH 202	326.5	202.9	Mokokchung	Meluri, Phek District	—	—	
NH 229	19.0	11.8	Thahekhü, Dimapur District	Chümoukedima	—	—	
NH 329A	30.0	18.6	Diphu	Pimla, Chümoukedima District	—	—	
NH 702	177.0	110.0	Changtongya, Mokokchung District	Tizit, Mon District	—	—	
NH 702A	260.0	161.6	Mokokchung	Meluri, Phek District	—	—	
NH 702B	104.0	64.6	Tuensang	Longleng	—	—	
NH 702D	85.0	52.8	Mokokchung	Tzürang Bridge	—	—	

== Odisha ==
Number	Length (km)	Length (mi)	Southern or western terminus	Northern or eastern terminus	Formed	Removed	Notes
NH 18	80.1	49.8	Jharkhand, T. junction with NH-49, Baripada, Betnoti and terminating at its junction with NH-16 near Baleshwar in the State of Orissa.		—	—	
NH 20	283.4	176.1	Jharkhand, Parsora, Kendujhargarh, Panikholi, Kualhia, Jajpur, Aradi, Chandbali, Raj Kanika and terminating at Satabhaya in the State of Orissa.		—	—	
NH 26	434.8	270.2	Junction with NH-53 near Bargarh connecting Barapali, Balangir, Bhawanipatna, Boriguma, Koraput in the State of Orissa-Andhra Pradesh.		—	—	
NH 49	429.3	266.8	Chhattisgarh, Kanaktora, Jharsuguda, Kuchinda, Pravasuni, Deogarh, Barakot, Palalaharha, Kendujhargarh, Bangriposhi in the State of Orissa-Jharkhand		—	—	
NH 53	524.5	325.9	Chhattisgarh, Bargarh, Sambalpur, Deogarh, Kanniah, Talcher, Kamakhyanagar, Sukinda, Dubri, Chandhikhol and Paradip Port in the State of Orissa		—	—	
NH 55	370.2	230.0	Junction with NH-53 near Sambalpur connecting Redhakhol, Angul, Banarpal, (Nuahata), Dhenkanal, Cuttack, Jagatsighpur, Balikuda, and terminating at Naugaon in the State of Orissa.		—	—	
NH 57	299.9	186.3	Junction with NH-26 near Balangir connecting Sonapur, Bauda, Dashapalla, Nayagarh and terminating at its junction with NH-16 near Khordha in the State of Orissa.		—	—	
NH 59	351.1	218.2	Junction with NH-353 near Khariar, Titlagarh, Lankagarh, Baligurha, Sorada, Asika and terminating at its junction with NH-16 near Brahmapur in the State of Orissa.		—	—	
NH 63	41.1	25.5	Chhattisgarh-Kotapad and terminating at its junction with NH-26 near Boriguma in the State of Orissa.		—	—	
NH 126	23.6	14.7	The highway starting from its junction with NH-26 near Barapali connecting Dhaurakhanda, Panimora, Chichinda and terminating at its junction with NH-53 near Sohela in the State of Odisha.		—	—	
NH 143	125.8	78.2	Jharkhand Panposh, Rajamunda and terminating at its junction with NH-49 near Barakot in the State of Orissa.		—	—	
NH 149	84	52	Junction with NH-49 near Palalaharha connecting Talcher and terminating at its junction with NH-55 at Banarpal (Nuahata) in the State of Orissa.		—	—	
NH 157	159	99	Junction with N.H- 57 near Purunakatak connecting Phulbani, Kalinga, Bhanjanagar and terminating near Asika on N.H-59 in the State of Odisha.		—	—	
NH 220	125.4	77.9	Jharkhand and connecting Tiringidihi, Rairangpur (Rairangnagar), Jashipur and terminating at its junction with N.H- 20 near Dhenkikot in the State of Odisha.		—	—	
NH 316	152.8	94.9	Junction with NH-16 near Bhubaneshwar connecting Puri-Konark and Puri-Satpada in the State of Orissa.		—	—	
NH 326	513.7	319.2	Junction with N.H-59 near Asika connecting Rayagada, Koraput, Jaypore, Malkangiri, Motu in the State of Odisha - Andhra Pradesh.		—	—	
NH 353	80.2	49.8	Chhattisgarh, Nauparha and terminating at its junction with NH-59 at Khariar in the State of Orissa.		—	—	
NH 516	5.9	3.7	The highway starting from its junction with NH-16 near Chhatrapur and terminating at Gopalpur in the State of Orissa.		—	—	
NH 520	108.4	67.4	Junction with NH-20 near Parsora and terminating at its junction with NH-143 near Rajamunda in the State of Orissa.		—	—	
NH 655	86	53	The highway starting from its junction with NH-55 near Angul (Angul stadium) connecting Mahidharpur, Satmile, Rasol, Bhapur, Athagarh, Gopinathapur, Totapada and terminating at its junction with NH-55 near Krushnashyampur in the State of Orissa.		—	—	
NH 720	89	55	The highway starting from its junction with NH-20 near Keonjhar connecting Basantpur, Deobandha, Bhagamunda, Brahmanipal, Dhanurjoypur and terminating at its junction with NH-53 at Duburi Chak in the State of Orissa.		—	—	
NH 126A	57	35	The highway starting from its junction with NH-26 near Barapali connecting Rampur, Singhijuba, Bisalpalii, Nagapalli and terminating at its junction with NH-57 near Sonapur in the State of Odisha.		—	—	
NH 130C	22.8	14.2	Chhattisgarh and terminating at its junction with new NH No. 201 near Baldhimal in the State of Odisha.		—	—	
NH 130CD	105.4	65.5	Chhattisgarh Border- Ghutkel, Kundei, Hatabharandi, Raighar, Beheda, Umerkote, Dhodra, Dhamanaguda, Dabugaon - junction with new NH No. 26 near Papdahandii		—	—	
NH 143H	28.7	17.8	Junction with NH-143 near Joram - Ambapani -Jharkhand Border		—	—	
NH 153B	116	72	Sarapal on N.H -53 connecting Naktideul, Redhakhol on N, H- 55 and terminating at Bauda on N.H- 57 in the State of Odisha.		—	—	
NH 157A	36	22	The Highway starting from its junction with N.H- 157 near Phulbani connecting Jamujhari, Dutimendi, Khajuripada and terminating at its junction with NH-57 near Madhapur in the State of Odisha.		—	—	
NH 16GQ	444	276	West Bengal, Baleshwar and Bhubaneshwar in the State of Orissa, Andhra Pradesh		—	—	
NH 316A	348.5	216.5	The highway starting from its junction with NH-316 near Konark connecting Ratanpur, Satabhaya, Dhamra, Basudevpur, Talapada, Chandipur, Chandaneswar in state of Odisha and terminating at Digha in the State of West Bengal.		—	—	
NH 320D	34.1	21.2	The highway starting from its junction with NH-20 near Chakradharpur connecting Sonua, Goelkera, Manoharpur, Jaraikela in the state of Jharkhand and terminating at its junction with NH- 143 (Raurkela Bypass) in the state of Odisha.		—	—	
NH 326A	102.9	63.9	The highway starting from its junction with new NH No. 326 near Mohana connecting Chandiput, Chheligada, Ramagiri Udayagiri, Raygarh, Parlakimidi, in the state of Odisha-Andhra Pradesh.		—	—	
NH 516A	98	61	The highway starting from its junction with NH-516 near Gopalpur Port and terminating at its junction with NH-316 near Satpada in the State of Odisha.		—	—	

== Punjab ==
Number	Length (km)	Length (mi)	Southern or western terminus	Northern or eastern terminus	Formed	Removed	Notes
NH 3	177	110	Attari (starting point)-Amritsar-Jalandhar-Hoshiarpur- Kullu-Manali (up to Himachal Border) (Jalandhar-Hoshiarpur up to HP Km 118.465 to 177.00 with PWD)		—	—	
NH 5	223.25	138.72	Ferozepur (starting Point) - Moga - Jagraon - Ludhiana - Kharar - Chandigarh - Kalka - Shimla up to HP Border (RD. 221.570 to 236.845= 15.275 km in UT) (Hussiniwal to Ferozepur Km 0.00 to 17.97 with PWD)		—	—	
NH 7	344.17	213.86	Sulemanka Border-Fazilka (starting point) - Abohar - Malout - Bathinda - Barnala - Sangrur - Patiala - Zirakpur - Panchkula - Paonta Sahib - Rishikesh - Ruderpurag-Manna up to Haryana (Sulemanka Border-Fazilka- Abohar Km 0.00 to 48.713 with PWD)		—	—	
NH 9	33.05	20.54	Malout (starting point) - Dabwali -up to Haryana border		—	—	
NH 44	274.39	170.50	Sri Nagar - Jammu - Pathankot - Mukerian - Jalandhar - Ludhiana - Rajpura - Delhi up to Shambu border		—	—	
NH 52	56.84	35.32	Sangrur (Starting point) -Patran - Khanouri - Hissar up to Haryana border		—	—	
NH 54	327.65	203.59	Pathankot (Starting point) - Amritsar - Zira - Faridkot - Bathinda - Dabwali up to junction with NH-9 (Amritsar-Bathinda-Jodhpur Rupana Km 112.575 to 299.065 with PWD)		—	—	
NH 62	32.37	20.11	Abohar bypass (Starting point) - Saduwali- Sri Ganga Nagar up to Rajasthan border		—	—	
NH 105B	49	30	The highway starting from its junction with NH-5 near Dhillon Nagar (Moga), connecting Bagha Purana (NH-254) and terminating at its junction with NH-54 near Bajakhana in the State of Punjab.		—	—	
NH 148B	122.14	75.89	The highway starting from its junction with new NH-48 at Kotputli in the State of Rajasthan connecting Narnaul, Mahendergarh, Charkhi Dadri, Bhiwani, Hansi, Barwala, Tohana in the State of Haryana, Moonak-Jakhal-Budhlada-Bhikhi-Mansa and terminating at its junction with NH-54 near Bathinda		—	—	
NH 148BB	61.1	38.0	The highway starting from its junction with NH-148B near Moonak connecting Lehra Gaga and terminating at Sunam in the State of Punjab.		—	—	
NH 152	30.99	19.26	Ambala-Zirakpur-Kalka road up to Haryana border		—	—	
NH 152A	12	7.5	The highway starting from its junction with new NH-54 near Khanauri, Shergarh, Amo in the State of Punjab.		—	—	
NH 154	11.97	7.44	Pathankot - Nurpur - Mandi (up to HP border)		—	—	
NH 154A	39.36	24.46	The highway starting from its junction with NH-154 near Chakki, Dhar in the State of Punjab connecting Banikhet, Chamba and terminating at Bharmour in the State of Himachal Pradesh. (Km 0.00 to 39.360)		—	—	
NH 205	65.6	40.8	Kharar (Starting point) - Ropar - Kiratpur Sahib- Swarghat - Nauni- Shimla (up to HP border)		—	—	
NH 205A	39.53	24.56	The highway starting from its junction with NH-5 at Kharar connecting Banur and terminating at its junction with NH-44 at Tepla in the State of Punjab.		—	—	
NH 254	155.17	96.42	The highway starting from its junction with NH-54 at Mudki connecting Baghapurana, Salabatpura, Rampura, Maur, Takth Sri Damdama Sahib in the State of Punjab and terminating at its junction with NH-54 near Dabwali in the State of Haryana.		—	—	
NH 344	4.52	2.81	Ambala-Naraingarh-Paunta Sahib road Km. 9.230 to 13.750		—	—	
NH 344A	88	55	Phagwara bypass, Banga, Nawanshahr, Balachaur- Ropar (Ropar city portion Km 81.900 to 88.00 with PWD)		—	—	
NH 344B	35	22	The highway starting from its junction with NH-44 at Phagwara and terminating at its junction with NH-3 at Hoshiarpur in the State of Punjab.		—	—	
NH 354	305.39	189.76	The highway starting from its junction with NH-54 near Gurdaspur connecting Derababa Nanak, Ramdas, Ajnala, Amritsar (NH-3), Chabal Kalan, Bhikhiwind, Amarkot, Khem Karan (Indo-Pak Border) Arifke, Ferozepur (NH-5), Sadiq, Sri Muktsar Sahib (NH-754), Rupana and terminating at its junction with NH-7		—	—	
NH 354B	6	3.7	The highway starting from its junction with NH-354 near Dera Baba Nanak and termination at Indo-Pak Border in the State of Punjab.		—	—	
NH 354E	50.88	31.62	The highway starting from its junction with NH-09 near Dabwali connecting Sito Gunno and terminating near Abohar on NH-07		—	—	
NH 503A	126.77	78.77	Amritsar-Mehta-Sri Hargobindpur-Tanda- Hoshiarpur in the State of Punjab (RD. 8.27 to 135.040)		—	—	
NH 503	35.72	22.20	The highway starting from its junction with NH-3 near Mubarakpur connecting Amb, Una, Dehlan in the State of Himachal Pradesh, Anandpur Sahib, Kiratpur Sahib and terminating at its junction with NH-205.		—	—	Extension
NH 703	234.72	145.85	Jalandhar (Starting point) - Nakodar - Moga - Barnala, Handiaya, Mansa, Jhunir in the State of Punjab, Sardulgarh and terminating at its junction with new NH-9 near Sirsa in the State of Haryana. (Km 0.00 to 12.00 & Km 149.00 to 234.720 with PWD)		—	—	
NH 703A	101.18	62.87	The highway starting from its junction with new NH-3 near Jalandhar connecting Kapurthala, Sultanpur Lodhi, Pindi, Makhu, Mallanwala and terminating at its junction with New NH-354 near Arifke		—	—	
NH 703B	75.16	46.70	The highway starting from its junction with NH-703 near Moga connecting Harike and terminating at Khalra in the State of Punjab .{ RD 0.00 to 86.236 (RD 33.611 to 44.680 is overlap)}		—	—	
NH 754	74.49	46.29	The highway starting from its junction with new NH-54 near Bathinda connecting Muktsar and terminating at Jalalabad in the State of Punjab		—	—	
NH 703AA	50.25	31.22	The highway starting from its junction with NH-703A near Kapurthala connecting Gonidwal Sahib and terminating at its junction with NH-54 near Tarantarn in the State of Punjab.		—	—	

== Rajasthan ==
Number	Length (km)	Length (mi)	Southern or western terminus	Northern or eastern terminus	Formed	Removed	Notes
NH 11	759.7	472.1	Junction with NH-70 near Myajlar connecting Jaisalmer, Pokharan, Bikaner, Sri Dungarpur, Ratangarh, Fatehpur, Jhunjhunu, Chirawa -Haryana.		—	—	
NH 21	200.0	124.3	Junction with NH-48 near Jaipur connecting Dausa, Bharatpur-Uttar Pradesh.		—	—	
NH 23	228.0	141.7	The highway starting from its junction with NH-52 near Kothum connecting Lalsot, Karauli, Bari and terminating at its junction with NH-44 near Dhaulpur in the State of Rajasthan.		—	—	
NH 25	383.8	238.5	Munabao Road- Ramsar- Barmer - Kawas, Madhasar, Dhudhwa, Bagundi, kher, Tilwara, Balotra, Pachpadra, Kalyanpur, Jodhpur, Kaparda, Bilara, Jaitaran, Bar-junction with NH-58		—	—	
NH 27	640.9	398.2	Pindwara - Wekria - Tarawaligarh - Gogunda - Iswal - Udaipur - Debari - Bhatevar - Mungarwar - Chittaurgarh - Anwalhera - Kalunda - Ladpura - Menal - Kheri - Bijolia - Dabi - Kharipur - Kota - Bhonra - Anta - Baran - Kishanganj - Kelwara - Shahbad - Deori - Thana Kasba - MP Border.		—	—	
NH 44	28.3	17.6	UP Border - Maniyan - Dhaulpur - MP Border		—	—	
NH 48	732.0	454.8	Haryana Border- Kotputli, near Jaipur, Kishangarh, Bhilwara, Chittaurgarh, Udaipur in the State of Rajasthan- Gujarat Border		—	—	
NH 52	706.6	439.1	MP Border - Ghatoli - Aklera - Ameta - Jhalawar - Khemai - Darrah - Mandara - Kota - Talera - Bundi - Sathur - Hindoli - Umar - Devli - Mendwas - Tonk - Baroni - Newai - Chaksu - Sheodaspura - Sanganer - Jaipur-Fatehpur- Haryana Border		—	—	
NH 54	60.0	37.3	Hanumangarh- Paka- Samoka- Goluwala- Kenchiya		—	—	
NH 56	235.2	146.1	Nimahera (NH-48) - Bari - Chhoti Sadri - Dhamotar - Pratapgarh - Pipalkhunt - Khamera - Ghatol - Banswara - Kalingera - Gujarat Border.		—	—	
NH 58	526.7	327.3	Junction with NH-52 near Fatehpur connecting Ladnun, Nagaur, Merta City, Ajmer, Beawar, Devgarh, Udaipur - Kumdal - Naya Kheda - Jhadol - Som - Nalwa Daiya - Gujarat Border		—	—	
NH 62	699.0	434.3	Punjab-Ganganagar, Suratgarh, Lunkaransar, Bikaner, Nagaur, Jodhpur, Pali, Sirohi and terminating at its junction with NH-27 near Pindwara		—	—	
NH 68	421.9	262.2	Junction with NH-11 near Jaisalmer connecting Barmer, Sanchorn-Gujarat Border		—	—	
NH 70	323.0	200.7	Junction with NH-25 near Munabao connecting Sundra, Myajlar, Dhanana, Asutar, Ghotaru, Loghewala, -junction with NH-68 near Tanot		—	—	
NH 123	60.2	37.4	Dhaulpur (NH-3) - Sepau - UP border / UP border - Ghatoli - Rupbas - Khanuawa - Uncha Nagla (NH-11)		—	—	
NH 125	176.5	109.7	The highway starting from its junction with NH-25 near Jodhpur connecting Balesar, Dechhu and terminating at its junction with NH-11 near Pokaran in the State of Rajasthan.		—	—	
NH 148	102.7	63.8	The highway starting from its junction with NH-48 near Manoharpur connecting Dausa and terminating at its junction with NH-23 near Lalsot in the State of Rajasthan.		—	—	
NH 148B	20.0	12.4	Junction with NH no. 48 at Kotputli- Haryana Border		—	—	
NH 148C	47.0	29.2	Junction with NH 48 at Km 280.300 intersecting NH-52 and terminating at its junction with NH-21 at km 222.750		—	—	
NH 148D	256.0	159.1	Uniara (NH-552)-Nainwa - Hindoli - Jahajpur - Shahpura - Gulabpura (NH-48) - Parasoli - Bheem (NH-58)		—	—	
NH 148N	345.0	214.4	The highway starting from its junction with NH-48 near Dodka (Vadodara) connecting Godhra, Dahod in the state of Gujarat, Ratlam, Jaora in the state of Madhya Pradesh, Jhalawar, Kota, Sawai Madhopur, Lalsot, Dausa in the state of Rajasthan, Firozpur Jhirka and terminating at its junction with NH-248A near Sohna in the state of Haryana.		—	—	
NH 156	9.3	5.8	junction with NH-56 near Nimbahera in the State of Rajasthan and up to Rajasthan / Madhya Pradesh.		—	—	
NH 158	134.8	83.8	Merta (NH 89) - Lambia - Ras - Bawra - Bayawar - Badnor - Asind - Mandal (NH-79)		—	—	
NH 162	309.9	192.6	Pali - Jadan - Khamal - Sojat - Chandawal - Raipur - Bayawar.// Pali (N.H-14) - Marwad - Nadol - Desuri - Kumbalgarh - Haldighati - Nathdwara - Mavli - Bhatevar.		—	—	
NH 162A	50.5	31.4	Mavli (NH-162) - Fatehnagar - Dariba - Railmagra - Khandel (NH-758)		—	—	
NH 168	70.0	43.5	Revdar, Anandra - junction with NH-62 near Sirohi		—	—	
NH 168A	10.0	6.2	Junction with NH-68 near Sanchore		—	—	
NH 248	28.0	17.4	Old alignment of NH no. 8 passing through Jaipur from km 220 to 273.50		—	—	
NH 248A	102.0	63.4	Sahpura - Alwar- Ramgarh- Haryana/Rajasthan border		—	—	
NH 311	46.0	28.6	The highway starting from its junction with NH-11 near Singhana connecting Khetri Nagar, Jasrapur, Nangli, Saledisingh, Bhatiwar, Chhawasari, and terminating at Titanwara in the State of Rajasthan.		—	—	
NH 325	135.0	83.9	Balotra - Siwana- Jalore- Ahor- Sandera		—	—	
NH 448	57.1	35.5	junction with NH-48 near Kishangarh connecting Ajmer and terminating at its junction with NH-48 near Nasirabad		—	—	
NH 458	224.0	139.2	Junction with NH-58 at Ladnu connecting Khaatu, Degana, Merta City, Lambia, Jaitran, Raipur and terminating at Bheem on NH-58		—	—	
NH 552	77.5	48.2	Tonk - Kakor - Uniara - Sawai Madhopur.		—	—	
NH 552G	30.0	18.6	The highway starting from its junction with NH-52 near Jhalarapatan connecting Beenda, Dawal in the state of Rajasthan further connecting Soyat, Susner, Agar, Ghosla, Ghatia and terminating at Ujjain in the state of Madhya Pradesh.		—	—	
NH 709	60.3	37.5	Haryana - Pilani - Rajgarh Road (NH-65)		—	—	
NH 752	93.5	58.1	Baran - Atru - Chippa - Barod - Aklera (NH 12)		—	—	
NH 754K	630.0	391.5	The highway starting from its junction with new NH-54 near Sangariya connecting Hanumangarh, Suratgarh, Loonkarasar, Bikaner, Jodhpur, Thob, Pachpadra, Balotra, Sanchore in the state of Rajasthan, Tharad, Vav and terminating at its junction with NH-27 near Santalpur in the state of Gujarat.		—	—	
NH 758	156.0	96.9	Rajsamand (NH-58) - Gangapur - Bhilwara - Ladpura (NH-27)		—	—	
NH 911	184.0	114.3	The highway starting from its junction with NH-11 near Bap connecting Naukh, Charanwala, Ranjitpura, Godu, Gokul, Tawarwala, Jaggasar, Dantour, and terminating at Poogal in the State of Rajasthan.		—	—	
NH 911A	30.8	19.1	The highway starting from its junction with NH-31 near Machhlishahar connecting Janghai, Durgaganj, Bhadohi, Kapsethi and terminating at its junction with Lahartara- Mohansaray road (ODR) near Varanasi in the state of Uttar Pradesh.		—	—	
NH 919	5.0	3.1	Haryana Border - Bhiwadi - Haryana Border		—	—	
NH 921	48.0	29.8	The highway starting from its junction with NH-21 near Mahwa connecting Mandwar, Nangal Sumer Singh, Almarpur, Kheda, Mangalsinh, Ghadi, Antapuar, Piana, Doroli, Machedi Mode, and terminating at Rajgarh bypass in the State of Rajasthan.		—	—	
NH 925	134.0	83.3	The highway starting from its junction with NH-25 near Gagaria connecting Baori kalan, Serwa and terminating at Bakhasar in the State of Rajasthan.		—	—	
NH 925A	63.1	39.2	The highway starting from its junction with new NH-925 near Satta and terminating at its junction with new NH No.- 68 near Gandhav in the State of Rajasthan.		—	—	
NH 927A	313.0	194.5	Madhya Pradesh Border - Banswara - Sagwara - Doongarpur - Kherwara - Kotra - Sawarupganj (N.H-14)		—	—	
NH 954	44.6	27.7	The highway starting from its junction with NH-54 near Pakka Saharaha connecting Morjanda Khari, Mamakhera, Lalgarh Jattan, Banwala, 4LNP and terminating at its junction with NH-62 near Kaluwala in the state of Rajasthan.		—	—	

== Sikkim ==
Number	Length (km)	Length (mi)	Southern or western terminus	Northern or eastern terminus	Formed	Removed	Notes
NH 10	52	32	Gangtok - Singtam - Rangpo - West Bengal Border.		—	—	
NH 310	87	54	Ranipaul (NH-31A) - Burduk - Menla - Nathula		—	—	
NH 310A	55	34	Tashiview point - Phodang - Mangan		—	—	
NH 510	70	43	Singtham - Damthang- Legship - Gyalshing		—	—	
NH 710	45	28	Melli- Manpur- Namchi- Damthang- Tarku		—	—	
NH 717A	112	70	West Bengal Border- Rhenok, Pakyong a-junction with new NH No. 10 near Gangtok		—	—	
NH 717B	42	26	Junction with NH No. 717A at Rhenok - Aritar, Rolep -junction with NH No. 310 near Menla		—	—	

== Tamil Nadu ==
Number	Length (km)	Length (mi)	Southern or western terminus	Northern or eastern terminus	Formed	Removed	Notes
NH 32	673	418	Chennai - Tindivanam - Puducherry - Cuddalore - Chidambaram - Nagapattinam - Thiruthuraipoondi - Ramanathapuram - Thoothukkudi		—	—	
NH 36	349	217	Vikravandi - Panruti - Sethiyathope - Kumbakonam - Thanjavur - Pudukottai - Thirupathur - Sivagangai - Manamadurai		—	—	
NH 38	568.1	353.0	Vellore - Villupuram - Perambalur - Trichy - Madurai - Aruppukottai - Thoothukkudi		—	—	
NH 44	627.2	389.7	Hosur-Krishnagiri-Dharmapuri-Salem-Karur-Dindigul-Madurai-Virudhunagar-Tirunelveli-Kanniyakumari		—	—	
NH 48	237.6	147.6	Chennai - Kanchipuram - Ranipet - Vellore - Vaniyambadi - Hosur		—	—	
NH 77	176.3	109.5	Krishnagiri - Uthangarai - Tiruvannamalai - Gingee - Tindivanam		—	—	
NH 79	134.2	83.4	Salem - Attur - Ulundurpet		—	—	
NH 81	321.4	199.7	Coimbatore - Kangeyam - Karur - Trichy - Lalgudi - Jayamkondacholapuram - Kattumannarkoil - Chidambaram		—	—	
NH 83	389	242	Coimbatore - Pollachi - Palani - Oddanchatram - Dindigul - Trichy - Thanjavur - Tiruvarur - Nagapattinam		—	—	
NH 85	225.2	139.9	Theni - Madurai - Thiruppuvanam - Sivagangai - Thondi		—	—	
NH 87	174.3	108.3	Thiruppuvanam - Manamadurai - Ramanathapuram - Rameshwaram - Dhanushkodi		—	—	
NH 181	171.8	106.8	Coimbatore - Mettupalayam - Ooty - Gudalur		—	—	
NH 183	133.8	83.1	Dindigul - Batlagundu - Theni - Cumbum - Kumily		—	—	
NH 536	109.4	68.0	Thirumayam - Devakottai - Thirvadanai - Ramanathapuram		—	—	
NH 544	182	113	Salem - Erode - Coimbatore - Walayar		—	—	
NH 544H	94	58	Thoppur - Mettur - Bhavani - Erode		—	—	
NH 744	150	93	Thirumangalam - Srivilliputhur - Rajapalayam - Tenkasi - Sengottai - Puliyarai		—	—	
NH 948	119.7	74.4	Hassanur - Bannari - Sathyamangalam - Annur - Coimbatore		—	—	
NH 136	140	87	Thanjavur - Paluvur - Ariyalur - Kunnam - Perambalur - Veppanthattai - Attur		—	—	
NH 179A	141	88	Salem - Harur - Uttangarai - Tirupathur - Vaniyambadi		—	—	
NH 381A	72	45	Vellakoil - Muthur - Erode - Sankagiri		—	—	
NH 381B	46	29	Musiri - Namakkal		—	—	
NH 383	105	65	Dindigul - Natham - Kottampatty - Karaikudi		—	—	
NH 785	39	24	Madurai - Natham		—	—	
NH 844	90	56	Hosur - Rayakottai - Palakode - Adhiyamankottai		—	—	

== Telangana ==
Number	Length (km)	Length (mi)	Southern or western terminus	Northern or eastern terminus	Formed	Removed	Notes
NH 30	100.4	62.4	Vijayawada - Jagdalpur road		—	—	
NH 44	512.65	318.55	Nagpur - Hyderabad - Jadchrla - Kurnool - Ananthapur - Bangalore		—	—	
NH 61	57.3	35.6	Maharashtra Border- Nirmal, Khanapur, Mallapuram, Raikal -junction with NH-63 near Jagityal		—	—	
NH 161	140.5	87.3	Sangareddy-Jogipet - Pitlam-madnoor - (Maharashtra Border)		—	—	
NH 161B	60	37	Junction with NH-161 near Nizampet - Moodguntal, Narayanakhed, Manoor, Bellapur, Pulkurthi, Ibrahimpur, Athnoor, Dappur Telangana/Karnataka border		—	—	
NH 63	264.5	164.4	Jagadalpur road -Nizamabad - Bodhan - Maharashtra border		—	—	
NH 163	298	185	Chhattisgarh Border- Warangal - Jangaon - Bhuvanagiri - Hyderabad		—	—	
NH 363	90	56	Mancherial-Wankidi		—	—	
NH 563	248.8	154.6	Jagityal - Karimnagar - Warangal - Khammam		—	—	
NH 65	276.8	172.0	Pune - Hyderabad - Suryapet - Vijayawada		—	—	
NH 365	187	116	Nakrekal-Thungathurthi - Mahbubabad-Mallampalli Road		—	—	
NH 365B	184	114	Suryapet-Thirumalagiri-Jangaon-Siddipet-Siricilla		—	—	
NH 365BB	168	104	Suryapet - Mothey- Khammam- Wyra-Sattupalli-Aswaraopeta- Andhra Pradesh Border- Rajamahendravaram		—	—	
NH 565	86.1	53.5	Nakrekal - Nagarjuna Sagar Road		—	—	
NH 765	186.8	116.1	Hyderabad - Amangal - Kalwakurthy - Achampeta - AP border		—	—	
NH 150	12.24	7.61	Kalaburgi - Yadgir - Krishna Road		—	—	
NH 167	311.9	193.8	Haggari - Raichur -Mahbubnagar -Jadcherla Road - Mirialaguda - Kodad		—	—	
NH 353C	99.2	61.6	Sironcha- Atmakur		—	—	
NH 365A	76	47	Kodad - Khammam - Kuravi Road		—	—	
NH 353B	33	21	Adilabad - Bela, Adilabad - Vansadi road		—	—	
NH 765D	54	34	Hyderabad (junction at outer ring road) - Narsapur- Rampur, - Medak		—	—	
NH 161AA	157.5	97.9	Junction with NH No. 161 near Sangareddy(NH 65) - Narsapur, Toopran(NH 44), Gajwel(SH 1), Jagdevpur, Bhuvanagiri(NH 163)-junction with NH-65 near Choutuppal		—	—	
NH 161BB	157.5	97.9	Junction with NH 161 near Madnoor -Sonala, Thadi Hipperga, Limboor, Sirpur, Kotagiri, Rudrur - junction at NH-63 near Bodhan		—	—	
NH 167N	120	75	Junction with NH 167 near Mahabubnagar -Raichur, Kosgi Kodangal, Kodangal Tandur, Tandur Vikarabad		—	—	

== Tripura ==
Number	Length (km)	Length (mi)	Southern or western terminus	Northern or eastern terminus	Formed	Removed	Notes
NH 8	331.9	206.2	Assam Border - Churai Bari - Manu - Ambasa - Teliamura-Agaratala - Visalgarh - Barjala - Udaipur - Sabrum-Indo Bangladesh Border		—	—	
NH 108	134.0	83.3	Mizoram Border - Sakhan - Manu		—	—	
NH 108A	22.9	14.2	Jolaibari	Belonia	—	—	
NH 108B	55.0	34.2	Agartala	Khowai	—	—	
NH 208	265.0	164.7	Kumarghat	Teliamura	—	—	
NH 208A	45.0	28.0	Agartala	Khowai	—	—	

== Uttar Pradesh ==
Number	Length (km)	Length (mi)	Southern or western terminus	Northern or eastern terminus	Formed	Removed	Notes
NE 2	90	56	Eastern Peripheral Expressway around in UP and Haryana		—	—	
NH 9	147.6	91.7	Delhi Border - Ghaziabad - Hapur - Rajabpur - Didauli - Pakbara - Moradabad - Rampur -Bilaspur - Uttrakhand Border		—	—	
NH 19	655.2	407.1	Agra - Firozabad - Shikohabad - Sirsaganj - Jaswantnagar - Etawah - Sarai - Muradganj - Sikandra - Rasdhan - Bara - Sachendi - Kanpur - Moharajganj - Aung - Fatehpur - Haswa - Sat Narain - Khaga - Palhana - Kaushambi - Allahabad - Saidabad - Handia - Gopiganj - Mirza Murad - Varanasi - Chandauli - Saiyad Raja - Bihar border		—	—	
NH 21	265	165	Rajasthan-Agra, Jalesar, Sikandra Rao and terminating at its junction with NH 30 near Bareilly		—	—	
NH 24	275.2	171.0	Sonauli - Kolhu - Pharenda - Rawatganj - Gorakhpur - Bhaurapur - Kauriram - Ghosipur - Mardah - Ghazipur - Zamania - Saiyad Raja		—	—	
NH 27	581	361	MP Border - Jhansi - Baragaon - Ghirgaon - Amargarh - Moth - Pirauna - Orai - Usargaon - Kalpi - Bara - Kanpur - Unnao - Ajgain - Lucknow.Bara Banki - Ramsanehighat - Faizabad - Haraiya - Basti - Khalilabad - Piprauli - Gorakhpur - Hata - Kasia - Fazilnagar - Pawanagar - Tamkuhi - Bihar Border		—	—	
NH 28	292	181	Indo/Nepal Border, Naugarh, Sidarth Nagar, Bansi, Basti Tanda, Azamgarh - junction with NH-31 at Varanasi		—	—	
NH 30	624	388	Uttrakahnd Border - Najibabad - Nagina - Afzalgarh - Rehar - Uttrakahnd Border-- Jahanbad - Pilibhit - Bareilly - Banthra - Sahjanpur - Uncholia - Neri - Mohli - Sitapur - Lucknow., Raebareli and Allahabad in the State of Uttar Pradesh-Madhya Pradesh		—	—	
NH 31	522.8	324.9	Junction with NH-27 near Unnao connecting Lalganj, Raebareli, Salon, Pratapgarh, Machhlishahr, Jaunpur, Varanasi, Ghazipur - Ballia - Rudrapur - Bakutha - Bihar Border		—	—	
NH 34	723.4	449.5	Uttrakhand border-Najibabad - Kiratpur -Bijnor -Bahsuma - Mawana -Meerut (NH-58) -Hapur -Gulawthi - Bulandshahar- Khurja - Amiya - Aligarh - Etah - Kurawali - Sultanganj - Bewar - Nabiganj - Chhibramau - Gurusahayganj - Kannauj - Araul - Bilhaur -Kanpur - Ghatampur - Sajet - Hamirpur - Sumerpur - Maudeha - Khanna Kabrai - Mahoba - Srinager - MP Border.		—	—	
NH 35	629.2	391.0	Kabrai- Banda - Khuhand - Attarra - Badausa - Karwi - Raipura -Mau - Shankargarh - Bara - Jasra - Allahabad - Naini - Astabhuja - Mirzapur		—	—	
NH 39	91.7	57.0	Jhansi - Barwa Sagar - Sakrar - Mauranipur - MP border // MP Border - Dudhinagar - Wyndhamganj - Jharkhand border		—	—	
NH 44	269.1	167.2	Haryana Border - Kosi - Chhata - Mathura - Farah - Agra- MP Border // MP Border - Jhansi //MP Border - Karari - Jhansi - MP Border // MP Border - Babina - Talbehat - Bansi - Lalitpur - Birdha - Gona - MP Border		—	—	
NH 123	14	8.7	Rajasthan Border - Sarendhi - Rajasthan Border.		—	—	
NH 124C	38	24	The highway starting from its junction with NH-24 near Tarighat, connecting Bara in the state of Uttar Pradesh and terminating at its junction with NH-922 near Buxar in the state of Uttar Pradsesh.		—	—	
NH 124D	58.4	36.3	The highway starting from its junction with NH-24 near Mardah connecting Jakhania, Sadat, and terminating at its junction with NH-31 near Saidpur in the state of Uttar Pradesh..		—	—	
NH 128	156.9	97.5	Ambedkarnagar (Tanda) - Sultanpur - Amethi - Raibareli -		—	—	
NH 128A	72	45	The highway starting from its junction with NH-28 near Mohammadpur connecting to Badshapur and terminating at its junction with NH-31 Jaunpur in the state of Uttar Pradesh.		—	—	
NH 128B	100	62	The highway statrting from its junction with NH-28 near Azamgarh connecting Mau, Teekha and terminating at its junction with NH-31 near Phephna (Ballia) in the state of Uttar Pradesh		—	—	
NH 128C	50	31	The highway starting from its junction with NH-28 near Azamgarh and terminating at its junction with NH-24 near Dohrighat in the state of Uttar Pradesh.		—	—	
NH 135	64.8	40.3	Mirzapur - Lalganj - MP Border		—	—	
NH 135A	256	159	The highway starting from its junction with NH-35 near Mirzapur connecting to Aura, Bhadohi, Jaunpur, Shahganj Akbarpur and terminating at its junction with NH-27 near Ayodhya in the state of Uttar Pradesh.		—	—	
NH 135B	10	6.2	Junction with NH-35 near Mau- Madhya Pradesh Border		—	—	
NH 135BB	12.5	7.8	The highway starting from its junction with NH-35 (Bargarh More) near Jamira connecting Bargarh, Gahur in the state of Uttar Pradesh connecting Dubi, Magdaur and terminating at its junction with NH-135B near Dabhoura in the state of Madhya Pradesh.		—	—	
NH 135C	104	65	The highway starting from its junction with NH-35 near Allahabad connecting to Koraon, Drumanodganj, Haliya in the state of Uttar Pradesh, Awadhadam, Pipra, Manigarha, Karondiya, Bagdara, Chtrangi, Singrauli and terminating at its junction with NH-39 near Waidhan in the state of Madhya Pradesh.		—	—	
NH 219	5	3.1	Bihar Border- Chandauli (NH-19)		—	—	
NH 227A	218	135	Ayodhya (NH-27)- Chhawni- Kalwadi- Barhalganj- Barhaj- Bihar Border		—	—	
NH 230	74	46	The highway starting from its junction with NH-30 near Bakshi-ka-Talab connecting Chenhat, junction with NH-27, NH-731, NH-30, NH-27and terminating at its junction with NH-30 near Bakshi-ka-Talab in the State of Uttar Pradesh..		—	—	
NH 234	176.4	109.6	The highway starting from its junction with NH-34 near Kannauj connecting Bela, Etawah, Kishni and terminating at its junction with NH-34 at Bhongaon in the State of Uttar Pradesh.		—	—	
NH 307	30	19	Uttrakhand Border - Chhutmalpur - Biharigarh - Uttrakahnd Border		—	—	
NH 319D	48	30	The highway starting from its junction with NH-19 near Allahabad and terminating at its junction with NH-31 near Mungra Badshahpur in the state of Uttar Pradesh.		—	—	
NH 321	15	9.3	The highway starting from its junction with NH-2 near Kiraoli connecting Mori, Vamanpura, Jhengera and terminating at Kagarol in the State of Uttar Pradesh.		—	—	
NH 321G	41	25	The highway starting from its junction with NH 21 near Jalesar, to connecting Awagarh and terminating at its junction with NH 34 near Etah in the State of Uttar Pradesh.		—	—	
NH 328	92	57	The highway starting from its junction with NH-28 near Basti and connecting to Mehdawal, Karmaini (junction on NH-24 near Campierganj)-and terminating at its junction with NH-730 near Partawal (Kaptanganj) in the state of Uttar Pradesh.		—	—	
NH 328A	98	61	The highway starting from its junction with NH-328 Mehdalwal, Kahliabad, Dhanghata, Ramnagar and terminating at its junction with NH-28 near Nyori in the state of Uttar Pradesh.		—	—	
NH 330	248	154	Balrampur - Gonda - Navabganj - Ayodhya - Bilharghat - Bikapur - Sultanpur - Bhada - Piparpur - Khundaur - Bela - Soraon - Allahabad		—	—	
NH 330A	110	68	The highway starting from Rai Baraily N.H-30 connecting Jagdishpur and terminating at Faizabad on N.H-27 in the state of Uttar Pradesh		—	—	
NH 330B	48	30	Near Gonda (NH-330)- Near Jaewal (NH-927)		—	—	
NH 330D	129	80	The highway starting from its junction with NH-30 near Sitapur connecting to Misrikh, Baghauli, Hardoi, Bilgram and terminating at its junction with NH-34 near Kannauj in the state of Uttar Pradesh.		—	—	
NH 334	118.4	73.6	Meerut - MujjafarNagar - Uttrakhand Border		—	—	
NH 334A	15	9.3	Junction with NH-334 near Purkazi-Uttarakhand.		—	—	
NH 334B	60	37	Meerut - Haryana Border		—	—	
NH 334C	52.6	32.7	Ghaziabad - Dadri - Sikanderabad - Bulandshahr -		—	—	
NH 334D	66	41	The highway starting from its junction with NH-34 near Aligarh and connecting Khair, Jewar in the state of Uttar Pradesh and terminating at its junction with NH-44 near Palwal in the state of Haryana.		—	—	
NH 334DD	46.7	29.0	The highway starting from its junction with NH-334D near Hamidpur and connecting Jewar, Jhajhar, Kakod, Dhanaura and terminating at its junction with NH-34 near Bulandshahar in the state of Uttar Pradesh.		—	—	
NH 335	116	72	Lalganj-Fatehpur-Banda		—	—	
NH 339	21	13	The highway starting from its junction with NH-39 near Nowgong in the State of Madhya Pradesh and terminating at its junction with NH-34 near Srinagar in the State of Uttar Pradesh.		—	—	
NH 344	49	30	Haryana Border - Sarsawa - Pilkhani - Saharanpur		—	—	
NH 509	220	140	Agra - Khandauli - Sadabad - Hathras - Mandrak - Daud Khan - Aligarh - Danpur - Dibal - Babrala - Bahjoi - Chandausi - Bilari - Moradbad		—	—	
NH 519	25	16	The highway starting from its junction with NH-19 near Sikandara and terminating at its junction with NH-27 near Bhognipur in the State of Uttar Pradesh.		—	—	
NH 530	66.4	41.3	junction with NH-30 near Bareily and terminating at its junction with NH-9 near Rampur		—	—	
NH 530B	215	134	The highway starting from its junction with NH-30 near Bareilly connecting to Budaun, Hathras, and terminating at its junction with NH-44 near Mathura in the state of Uttar Pradesh		—	—	
NH 534	23	14	The highway starting from its junction with NH-34 near Najibabad in the State of Uttar Pradesh connecting Kotdwar, Satpauli and terminating near Bubakhal in the State of Uttarakhand.		—	—	
NH 539	7	4.3	MP Border - Jhansi (NH 26)		—	—	
NH 552	4	2.5	Madhya Pradesh Border - junction with NH-27		—	—	Ext.
NH 709A	141	88	The highway starting from its junction with NH-9 near Garhmukteswar connecting Meerut, Budhana, Shamli, Karnal, Jind, Mundal and terminating at its junction with NH-709 near Bhiwani in the state of Uttar Pradesh.		—	—	
NH 709B	170	110	Junction with NH-9 near Loni (Delhi) connecting Baghpat, Baraut, Shamli and terminating at its junction with NH- 344 near Saharanpur		—	—	
NH 709AD	143.6	89.2	The highway starting from its junction with NH-709 near Panipat in the state of Haryana connecting to Shamli, Muzaffarnagar, Bhopa, Bijnor and terminating at its junction with NH-734 near Nagina in the state of Uttar Pradesh		—	—	
NH 719	14.6	9.1	The highway starting from its junction with NH-19 near Etawah in the State of Uttar Pradesh connecting Bhind and terminating at its junction with NH-44 near Gwalior in the State of Madhya Pradesh.		—	—	
NH 727	29	18	Bihar Border - Nibua Raiganj - Padrauna - Kasia		—	—	
NH 727A	100	62	Gorakhpur (NH-27)- Deoria- Salempur- Bihar Border		—	—	
NH 727AA	26	16	The highway starting from its junction with NH-727 near Manuapul connecting Patzirwa, Paknaha in the state of Bihar, Pipraghat and terminating at its junction with NH-730 near Sevrahi in the state of Uttar Pradesh.		—	—	
NH 727B	129.4	80.4	The highway starting from its junction with NH- 27 near Fazilnagar Connecting Tamkuhi, Salempur, Esharou, Bhagalpur, Ubhaon, Sikandrapur, Baheri, Sukhpura, Hanumanganj and terminating at its junction with NH-31 near Ballia in the state of Uttar Pradesh.		—	—	
NH 727BB	31	19	The highway starting from its junction with NH-27 near Gorakhpur and terminating at its junction with NH-730 near Partawal in the state of Uttar Pradesh.		—	—	
NH 727G	70	43	The highway starting from its junction with NH-27 near Haraiya connecting to Bhabhnana, Swaminarayan, Manakpur and terminating at its junction with NH-330 near Gonda in the state of Uttar Pradesh.		—	—	
NH 727H	139	86	The highway starting from its junction with NH-27 near Barabanki connecting Dewa Sharif, Fatehpur, Mahmudabad, Biswan, Laharpur and terminating at its junction with NH-730 near Lakhimpur in the state of Uttar Pradesh.		—	—	
NH 730	568	353	The highway starting from Pilibhit on NH-30 connecting Puranpur, Kutar, Gola Gorakhnath, Lakhimpur, Isanagar, Nanpara (on NH-927), Bahraich (on NH 927), Balrampur, Maharajganj, Padrauna, Sewarhi, and terminating at NH- 27 near Salemgarh in the state of Uttar Pradesh. ..		—	—	
NH 730A	109	68	The highway starting from Maigalganj on N.H–30 connecting Pawayan and terminating at Puranpur on NH- 730 in the state of Uttar Pradesh.		—	—	
NH 730B	36	22	The highway starting from its junction with NH-30 near Bareilly, Bhutah and terminating at its junction with NH–731K near Bisalpur in the state of Uttar Pradesh.		—	—	
NH 730C	156	97	The highway starting from its junction with NH-730B near Bisalpur, Miranpur Katra, Fatehgarh and terminating at its junction with NH- 34 near Bewar in the state of Uttar Pradesh.		—	—	
NH 730H	48	30	The highway starting from its junction with NH-730 near Kudwa connecting Mihinpurwa, Motipur, Nishangarh, Bichia and terminating at Katarnighat in the state of Uttar Pradesh.		—	—	
NH 730S	40	25	The highway starting from its junction with NH-730 near Maharajganj, Nichlaul, Thuthibari and up to Indo / Nepal Border in the state of Uttar Pradesh.		—	—	
NH 731	557.1	346.2	Paliya-Shahjahanpur-Hardoi-Lucknow - Gosainganj - Amethi - Bhetwa - Haidargarh - Inhauna - Jagdishpur - Musafir Khana - Hasanpur - Sultanpur - Singramau - Bakhsha - Jaunpur-Khuthan-junction with NH-31 near Saidpur		—	—	
NH 731A	160	99	Near Pratapgarh (NH-31)- Jethwada- Shrangverpur- Manjhanpur- Rajapur- Near Chitrakoot (NH-35)		—	—	
NH 731AG	17.8	11.1	The highway starting from its junction with NH-731A near Rajapur connecting Ramtekra and terminating at its junction with NH-35 near Raipura in the state of Uttar Pradesh.		—	—	
NH 731B	86	53	The highway starting from its junction with NH-31 near Machhlishahar connecting Janghai, Durgaganj, Bhadohi, Kapsethi and terminating at its junction with Lahartara- Mohansaray road (ODR) near Varanasi in the state of Uttar Pradesh.		—	—	
NH 731K	109	68	The highway starting from NH-731 near Shahjahanpur connecting Bisalpur, Barkheda, Pilibhit, Neoria Husainpur in the state of Uttar Pradesh connecting Majhola, Chanda, Mundeli and terminating at its junction with NH-9 near Khatima in the state of Uttarakhand.		—	—	
NH 734	53	33	The highway starting from its junction with NH-34 near Najibabad connecting Nagina in the State of Uttar Pradesh, Kashipur in the State of Uttarakhand and terminating at its junction with NH-9 near Moradabad in the state of Uttar Pradesh.		—	—	
NH 927	140	87	Lucknow-Bara Banki - Ramnagar - Jarwal - Krisarganj - Fakharpur - Bahraich - Matera Bazar - Nanpara - Babaganj Rupidiha - Nepalganj.		—	—	
NH 931	68	42	Jagdishpur - Musafirkhana - Gauriganj - Amethi - Pratapgarh.		—	—	
NH 931A	55	34	Jagdishpur - Jais - Salon		—	—	

== Uttarakhand ==
Number	Length (km)	Length (mi)	Southern or western terminus	Northern or eastern terminus	Formed	Removed	Notes
NH 7	402.6	250.2	Himachal Pradesh, near Dehradun, Rishikesh, Devprayag, Rudraprayag, Karnaprayag, Gopeshwar, Badrinath, Mana in the State of Uttarakhand.		—	—	
NH 9	255.0	158.4	Uttar Pradesh, near Rudrapur, Sitarganj, Khatima, Tanakpur, Pithoragarh, Ogla, and terminating at Askot, in the State of Uttarakhand.		—	—	
NH 34	390.4	242.6	The highway starting from Gangotri connecting Bhatwari, Uttarkashi, Dharasu, New Tehri, Ampata, Rishikesh and Haridwar in the State of Uttarakhand.		—	—	
NH 107	76.0	47.2	The highway starting from its junction with NH-7 near Rudraprayag and connecting Guptakashi, Phata and terminating at Gaurikund near Kedarnath in the State of Uttarakhand.		—	—	
NH 107A	84.2	52.3	The highway starting from its junction with NH-7 near Gopeshwar connecting Ukhimath and terminating at its junction on NH-107 near Baramwari in the State of Uttrakhand.		—	—	
NH 109	314.0	195.1	The highway starting from its junction with NH-9 and connecting Rudrapur, Haldwani, Nainital, Bhowali, Almora, Ranikhet, Dwarahat, Chaukhutia, Gairsain, Adi Badri and terminating at its junction with NH-7 near Karnaprayag in the State of Uttarakhand.		—	—	
NH 307	7.5	4.7	The highway starting from its junction with NH-7 near Dehradun in the State of Uttarakhand and connecting Mohand, Biharigarh, and terminating its junction with NH-344 near Chhutmalpur in the State of Uttar Pradesh.		—	—	
NH 309	264.0	164.0	The highway starting from its junction with NH-9 near Rudrapur connecting Kashipur, Ramnagar, Dhumakot, Thalisain, Tripalisain, Bubakhal, Pauri and terminating at its junction with NH-7 near Srinagar in the State of Uttarakhand.		—	—	
NH 309A	208.0	129.2	The highway starting from its junction with new NH-9 near Rameshwar connecting Gangolihat, Berinag, Chaukori, Kanda, Bageshwar, Takula and terminating at its junction with new NH-109 near Almora in the State of Uttrakhand.		—	—	
NH 309B	82.0	51.0	The highway starting from its junction with NH-109 near Almora and terminating at its junction with NH-9 at Rameshwar in the State of Uttarakhand.		—	—	
NH 334	66.2	41.1	The highway starting from its junction with NH-34 near Haridwar connecting Roorkee in the State of Uttarakhand, Muzaffarnagar, Meerut and terminating at its junction with NH-34 near Meerut in the State of Uttar Pradesh.		—	—	
NH 334A	46.5	28.9	The highway starting from its junction with NH-334 near Purkazi in the State of Uttar Pradesh connecting Laksar and terminating at its junction NH-34 near Haridwar in the State of Uttarakhand.		—	—	
NH 344	22.0	13.7	The highway starting from its junction with NH-44 near Ambala connecting Dhanana, Saha, Yamunanagar in the State of Haryana, Saharanpur in the State of Uttar Pradesh, and terminating at its junction with NH-334 near Roorkee in the State of Uttarakhand.		—	—	
NH 507	111.4	69.2	The highway starting from NH-7 near Herbertpur connecting Vikasnagar, Kalsi, Barkot and terminating at its junction with NH-134 in State of Uttarakhand.		—	—	
NH 534	137.1	85.2	The highway starting from its junction with NH-34 near Najibabad in the State of Uttar Pradesh connecting Kotdwar, Satpuli and terminating near Bubakhal in the State of Uttarakhand.		—	—	
NH 707	40.5	25.2	Himachal Pradesh and passing through Minus–Tyuni in Himachal Pradesh–Uttarakhand.		—	—	
NH 707A	310.0	192.6	The highway starting from its junction with NH-707 at Tyuni connecting Chakrata, Bhediyana, Mussoorie, New Tehri and terminating at its junction with NH-7 at Sringar in the state of Uttarakhand		—	—	
NH 734	132.0	82.0	The highway starting from its junction with NH-34 near Najibabad connecting Nagina in the State of Uttar Pradesh and terminating at its junction with NH-309 near Kashipur in the State of Uttarakhand.		—	—	

== West Bengal ==
Number	Length (km)	Length (mi)	Southern or western terminus	Northern or eastern terminus	Formed	Removed	Notes
NH 10	66.0	41.0	Indo/Bangladesh border connecting Fulbari, Siliguri-Sikkim Border near Sevoke		—	—	
NH 12	432.3	268.6	The highway starting from its junction with NH-27 near Dalkola connecting Raiganj, Gajol, Maldah, Farakka, Morgram, Baharampur, Krishananagar, Ranaghat, Barasat, Kolkata, Kakdwip and terminating at Bok-Khali in the State of West Bengal.		—	—	
NH 14	373.1	231.8	The highway starting from its junction with NH-12 near Morgram connecting Rampur Hat, Siuri, Raniganj, Bankura, Garhbeta, Salbani and terminating at its junction with NH-16 near Kharagpur in the State of West Bengal.		—	—	
NH 16	111.7	69.4	junction with NH-19 near Kolkata connecting Kharagpur-Odisha Border		—	—	
NH 17	175.0	108.7	Junction with NH-10 near Sivok connecting Bagrakot, Chalsa, Nagarkata, Goyerkata, Birpara, Falakata, Sonarpur, Coochbehar, Tufanganj-Assam.		—	—	
NH 18	63.9	39.7	Jharkhand, Puruliya, Balarampur in the State of West Bengal-Jharkhand		—	—	
NH 19	208.7	129.7	Jharkhand Border- Asansol, Palsit and terminating at its junction with NH-16 near Kolkata		—	—	
NH 27	582.4	361.9	Bihar-Dalkola, Islampur, Siliguri, Jalpaiguri, Maynaguri, Dhupguri, Falakata, Sonapur, Salsabari in the State of West Bengal,-Assam.		—	—	
NH 31	62.2	38.6	Bihar-Harishchanderpur and terminating at its junction with NH-12 near Pandua in the State of West Bengal.		—	—	
NH 33	13.4	8.3	Jharkhand and terminating at its junction with NH-12 near Farakka in the State of West Bengal.		—	—	
NH 49	55.9	34.7	Jharkhand and terminating at its junction with NH-16 at Kharagpur		—	—	
NH 110	77.0	47.8	The highway starting from its junction with NH-10 near Siliguri connecting Kurseong and terminating at Darjeeling in the State of West Bengal.		—	—	
NH 112	59.6	37.0	The highway starting from its junction with NH-12 near Barasat connecting Gaighata, Bangaon and terminating at Indo/Bangladesh Border in the State of West Bengal.		—	—	
NH 114	119.2	74.1	junction with NH-14 near Mallarpur connecting Mayureswar, Prantik, Bolpur, Bhedia, Guskhara, Talit and terminating at its junction with NH-19 near Barddhaman		—	—	
NH 114A	13.6	8.5	The highway starting from Rampurhat on N.H-14 connecting Sunrichua in the state of West Bengal-Jharkhand.		—	—	
NH 116	52.7	32.7	The highway starting from its junction with NH-16 near Kolaghat and connecting Mecheda, Tamluk, Nandakumar and terminating at Haldia Port in the State of West Bengal.		—	—	
NH 116A	242.0	150.4	The highway starting from its junction with NH-16 near Mechogram (Panskura) and connecting Daspur, Bandar, Gourhati, Arambagh, Uchalan, Sehara Bazar, Burdwan, Karjana, Mangalkot, Panchgram and terminating at its junction with NH-12 near Moregram in the State of West Bengal.		—	—	
NH 116B	90.8	56.4	The highway starting from Nandakumar on N.H-116 connecting Contai, Digha and terminating at Chandaneswar in the state of West Bengal.		—	—	
NH 131A	55.2	34.3	The Highway starting from Malda, connecting Ratua and Debpur in the State of West Bengal-Bihar.		—	—	
NH 133A	4.4	2.7	Jharkhand and terminating with NH-12 near Nimtala in the State of West Bengal.		—	—	
NH 218	8.6	5.3	The highway starting from its junction with NH-18 near Purulia in the state of West Bengal connecting Chandakyari, Jhariya and terminating at its junction with NH- 18 near Dhanbad in the State of Jharkhand.		—	—	
NH 312	329.0	204.4	The highway starting from its junction with NH-12 near Jangipur connecting Omarpur, Murshidabad, Chunakhali, Jalangi, Karimpur, Tehatta, Krishangar, Hanskhali, Duttaphulia, Helencha, Bongoan, Panchpota, Berigopalpur Ghat, Ichamati, Tarnipur Ghat, Swarupnagar and terminating at Basirhat (Ghojadanga) in the State of West Bengal.		—	—	
NH 314	83.6	51.9	The highway starting from its junction with NH-14 near Bankura and terminating at its junction with NH-18 near Puruliya in the State of West Bengal.		—	—	
NH 316A	6.5	4.0	The highway starting from its junction with NH-316 near Konark connecting Ratanpur, Satabhaya, Dhamra, Basudevpur, Talapada, Chandipur, Chandaneswar in state of Odisha and terminating at Digha in the State of West Bengal.		—	—	
NH 317	70.0	43.5	The highway starting from its junction with NH-17 near Birpara connecting Madarihat, Rajabaht Khawa terminating at its junction with NH-27 near Salsabari in the State of West Bengal.		—	—	
NH 317A	18.2	11.3	The highway starting from its junction with NH-317 near Hasimara connecting Jaigaon in the state of West Bengal and terminating at Indo / Bhutan Border.		—	—	
NH 327	36.0	22.4	Junction with NH-27 near Bagdogra - Nuxalbari - Galgalia		—	—	
NH 327B	1.2	0.75	The Highway statrting from its junction with NH-327 near Panitanki connecting Mechi Bridge in the state of West Bengal and terminating at Indo / Nepal Border.		—	—	
NH 327C	11.0	6.8	The Highway statrting from its junction with NH-327 near Khoribari and terminating at its junction with NH-27 near Ghoshpukur in the state of West Bengal.		—	—	
NH 419	9.0	5.6	The highway starting from its junction with NH-19 near Kulti in the State of West Bengal connecting Chittaranjan, Jamtara and terminating at Gobindpur in the State of Jharkhand.		—	—	
NH 512	107.0	66.5	The highway starting from its junction with NH-12 near Gajol connecting Daulatpur, Bansihari, Gangarampur, Harsura, Balurghat and terminating at Hilli in the State of West Bengal near Indo/Bangladesh Border.		—	—	
NH 517	13.0	8.1	The highway starting from its junction with NH-17 near Goyerkata and terminating at its junction with NH-27 near Dhupgari in the State of West Bengal.		—	—	
NH 717	20.4	12.7	The highway starting from its junction with NH-17 near Baradighi and terminating at its junction with NH-27 near Maynaguri, Cangrabandha in the State of West Bengal and terminating at Indo / Bangladesh Border.		—	—	
NH 717A	92.0	57.2	Junction of new NH-17 near Bagrakot connecting Rhenock in the state of West Bengal-Sikkim.		—	—	

== See also ==
- List of national highways in India
- List of national highways in India by state (old numbering)
- List of national highways in India by union territory
