= Violence against Christians in India =

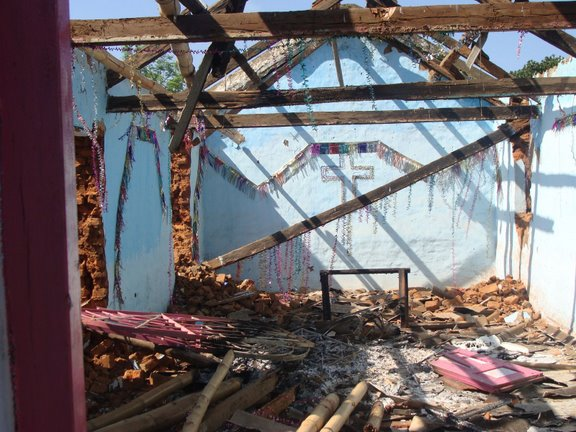
Remains of church property burnt down during 2008 Kandhamal violence in Orissa in August 2008

Violence against Christians in India is religiously motivated violence against Christians in India. Human Rights Watch has classified violence against Christians in India as a tactic used by the right-wing Sangh Parivar organizations to encourage and exploit communal violence in furtherance of their political ends. The acts of violence include arson of churches, conversion of Christians by force, physical violence, sexual assaults, murders, rapes, and the destruction of Christian schools, colleges, and cemeteries.

Anti-Christian violence increased dramatically since the Bharatiya Janata Party (BJP) started its rule at the centre, first in March 1998 and more recently in 2014 (incumbent). The Vishva Hindu Parishad (VHP), Bajrang Dal, and Rashtriya Swayamsevak Sangh (RSS) are the organizations which have been most frequently accused of inciting the violence.

Hundreds of incidents of violence against Christians are reported by various organizations every year. India's ministry of internal security and its National Commission for Minorities officially list more than a hundred religiously motivated attacks against Christians each year.

As of 2020, the United States Commission on International Religious Freedom placed India as Tier-1 in minority persecution along with countries like China, North Korea, Pakistan and Saudi Arabia.

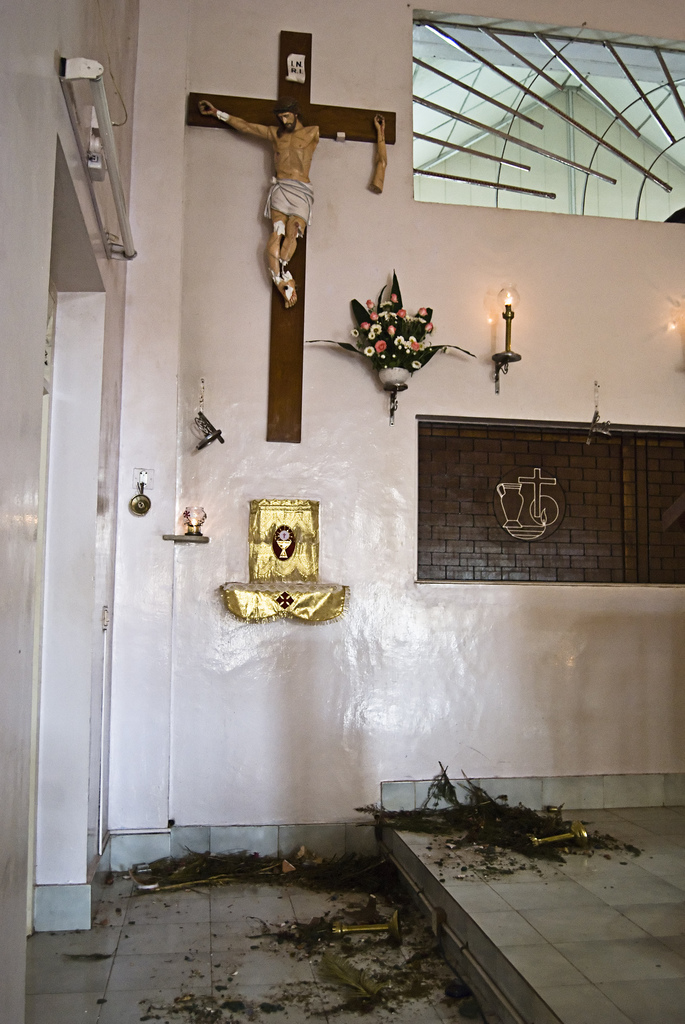
Destroyed property inside the Adoration Monastery, Mangalore, after it was vandalised by lobbyists of Bajrang Dal, during the September 2008 attacks on Christians in Mangalore

== Context of violence ==
Indian Christians were relatively unaffected by communal violence until the end of the 1990s and enjoyed social harmony with the majority Hindu community. However, the late 1990s saw a significant increase in acts of anti-Christian violence, and the year 1998 was the turning point. In the ensuing years, they were denounced in anti-Christian propaganda and they were targeted for violence by Hindu nationalist groups which wanted to prevent tribal voters and lower-caste voters from converting to Christianity. In March 1998, after the BJP came to power, anti-Christian violence dramatically increased.

Historically, the BJP and the Hindu nationalistic Sangh Parivar organizations were more likely to accept violence against minorities than their rival Congress Party. In most reported cases the named perpetrators are members of the Sangh Parivar organisations. The Sangh Parivar are small subgroups that formed under the umbrella of the Rashtriya Swayamsevak Sangh (RSS), an umbrella organisation whose roots date back to 1925. The RSS, who promote a form of nationalism, oppose the spread of "foreign religions" like Islam and Christianity. The Human Rights Watch report stated that Vishva Hindu Parishad (VHP), Bajrang Dal, and RSS (the sister organisations of the BJP) are the most accused organizations for violence against Christians in India. Although these organizations differ significantly in many ways, have all argued that since Hindus make up the bulk of Indians, India should be a Hindu state. RSS volunteers are taught to believe that India is a nation solely for the Hindus and that Hindus have suffered at the hands of invaders, notably Muslim rulers and Christian British. The Human Rights Watch reported that the attacks against Christians are part of the right-wing Sangh Parivar organizations' orchestrated effort to encourage and exploit sectarian violence to raise their political power base.

A 1999 Human Rights Watch report stated that in many instances, Christian institutions and individuals were singled out for violence in response to their efforts to promote education, good health and financial independence among the members of the tribal and Dalit communities. The Human rights Watch report also noted that a significant reason for the publication and circulation of anti-Christian propaganda and the acts of violence which it contributes to is a vested interest in keeping these communities in a state of economic dependence.

In 2008, the National Commission for Minorities reported that the State governments which were controlled by the BJP and its allies supported the perpetrators of violence against Christians. Anti Christian violence also intensified after the BJP came to power in 2014.

== Manifestation ==
Each year, India's internal security and its National Minority Commission officially list more than a hundred religiously motivated acts of violence which are committed against Christians, but the actual number of such attacks is probably higher, because Indian journalists estimate that only about 10% of such attacks are ever reported. These attacks include the ransacking of churches, monasteries, and other Christian institutions, the burning of copies of the Bible, the desecration of cemeteries, the murder of priests and missionaries, and the sexual assault of nuns.

From 1964 to 1996, at least 38 incidents of violence against Christians were reported. In 1997, 24 such incidents were reported. Since 1998, Christians in India have faced a wave of violence. In 1998 alone, 90 incidents were reported. According to the Indian Parliament, between January 1998 and February 1999, a total of 116 attacks on Christians occurred around the country. Many of the attacks occurred in the north and west, where the Christian community is smaller and has strong Hindu nationalistic sentiments. A November 2001 survey by the National Commission for Minorities reported 27 attacks on Christian institutions and Christians in 1997, 86 instances in 1998, 120 instances in 1999 and 216 attacks in 2000. According to the commission, the persecution of Christians had increased since the Bharatiya Janata Party came to power in 1998. In 2001, the All India Christian Council reported that Indian Christians are attacked every 36 hours.

Multiple news organizations reported an increase in the number of incidents of violence against Christians after the new BJP government under Narendra Modi came to power after the general election in April–May 2014. In 2014, the Ministry of Home Affairs reported a "steep 30 per cent rise in the number of communal violence incidents in 2013 as compared to 2012, with the maximum number of cases being reported from Uttar Pradesh.” Reported incidents of abuse carried out against Christians in India went up to 177 in 2015, and escalated to 300 in 2016, according to the Evangelical Fellowship of India (EFI). In 2017, EFI reported an increase in attacks by right-wing activists on churches on Sundays and other significant days of worship, such as Good Friday, Palm Sunday, Christmas and Easter. The police are being used to disrupt and prevent worship in churches and homes, particularly Uttar Pradesh and Tamil Nadu. Christian children traveling to Bible camps were put into detention and held for days on suspicions of conversion.

The persecution of Christians in India sharply increased in the year 2016, according to a report which was published by Open Doors. India was ranked 15th in the world in terms of danger to Christians, up from 31st four years earlier. According to the report, it is estimated that a church was burnt down or a cleric beaten on average 10 times a week in India in the year to 31 October 2016, a threefold increase on the previous year. According to the All India Christian Council, there was an attack on Christians recorded every 40 hours in India in 2016. In a report by the Indian organization, Persecution Relief, the crimes against Christians increased by 60% from 2016 to 2019. There were 330 incidents in 2016, 440 incidents in 2017, 477 in 2018 and 527 incidents of hate crimes in 2019. The organization reported there has been a direct link between BJP gaining power in a state and increase in the attacks against Christians in the state. In the first seven months of 2022, over 300 attacks against Christians were reported across the country.

Mainstream Protestant, Catholic and Orthodox Christians are targeted far less frequently than Evangelical and Pentecostal Christians.

== Causes and effects ==
=== Political factors ===
Hindu nationalists fear that as a result of the arrival of non-Hindus, higher fertility rates among minority groups and conversions to Christianity, the Hindu majority might become a minority. Hindu nationalists feel that if the Christian population increases, it will affect the dynamics of electoral politics and India's status as a Hindu nation. Basing their fear on their assumption that Christians have opposing allegiances, Hindu Nationalists portray conversions to Christianity as a national threat, because they reduce the number of people who have a shared national identity, a national identity which is vaguely claimed to be Hindu. The percentage of Christians, however, has dropped from 2.53% in 1971, 2.43% in 1991 to 2.3% in 2011. However, the VHP, which has a declared agenda of converting Christians and Muslims to Hinduism, opposes the constitutional right of a person to follow any religion. Despite the small number of Christians, as per the BJP's declared agenda of establishing a Hindu Rashtra, the other faiths are seen as enemies and must be ousted.

In the 2007 Khandamal violence, a pro-Kandha tribal group, the Kui Samaj, resisted the request of Pana Christians to modify the official recognition of Panas from Scheduled Caste to Scheduled Tribe that could have enabled Pana Christians to benefit from the reservation system even after conversion. The Kui Samaj planned a general strike to express their case. The members of the local Sangh Parivar who joined the strike caused the violence to rapidly spread by bringing the issue to the locals and they also prevented the police from adequately responding to it.

American political scientist Paul Brass argued that the generally insignificant, local communal conflicts in India are turned into larger instances of communal violence by groups which he calls 'conversion specialists'. Chad M. Bauman argued that the Sangh Parivar leaders followed the same technique in the 2008 Kandhamal riots by linking their local politics and clashes with broader national fears like extinction of Hinduism, a Christian demographic increase and even a 'Christian military coup'. Thereby providing justification for the anti-Christian violence and thus issuing a 'national call to arms' for the defense of the Khandamal Hindus.

=== Cultural factors ===
The Hindu nationalist version of Hinduism and its Sanskrit overtones generally do not fascinate the adivasi people and the Dalits. From the late nineties, affiliates of the Sangh Parivar such as the Vanavasi Kalyan Ashram began to set up schools for adivasi people and Dalits where simple skills were taught along with Religious teachings which were aimed at bringing the more Sanskrit and all-India upper-caste Hinduism into sync with the Dalit and Adivasi faith and ritualistic practices. The presence of Christian educational institutions in these regions has become a competitive challenge and an obstacle to this Hindu nationalist project.

Even though the participation of the non-Christian tribals than the nationalists not from the Dangs district in the 1998 attacks on Christians in Dangs district is very marginal, which may stem from them benefiting from Christian aided development projects. Even before the violence, there were tensions between both the Adivasis and the Christian Adivasis primarily because Christianity was seen as a cultural disruption. Christians have often rejected alcohol, which is a significant part of the regional festivity. Christians often did not take part in village rituals, often performed for the wellbeing and security of the entire village, which were viewed un-neighborly. The very willingness of Christians to break the traditions of the village is seen as a cultural threat. Thus, many members of the lower caste and tribes claim of Christian conversion as something of a deculturation just in the same way as the Hindu nationalists of the upper-castes do.

=== Economic factors ===
According to Sushil Aaron, Christian societies in India are doing better on indicators of human development such as literacy, education, prenatal treatment, perinatal deaths, and this can be due to the activities of foreign and local missionaries in establishing medical and educational institutions. Therefore, schools, including those where the major percentage of students are non-Christian, are frequently attacked in anti-Christian riots, and so was the case in 1998 attacks on Christians in Dangs district. In the 2007 Christmas violence in Kandhamal, the Dalit Panas Christians were the most targeted. Some members of the Kandha tribal community engaged in the riots as the two groups had grown over time in opposition to each other, with the Adivasi Kandhas traditionally believing themselves dominant to the Christian Dalit Panas. The strife was further fuelled by the fact that the Pana Christians had become much more educated and affluent in the years before the riots. Many Kandhas assumed that the Pana Christians were using their education to control the Kandhas and deprive them of land. Similar pressures also prevailed in the Dangs between Christianized tribals and their non-Christian tribal neighbours since the latter seemed to have effectively resisted domination by non-tribal members through the creation of collectives, by better exposure to the outside world and also challenging the power of local village elites. In the Kandhamal violence, more affluent Christians were specifically targeted.

== Major incidents ==
=== 1998 attacks on Christians in southeastern Gujarat ===
During the 1998 attacks on Christians in southeastern Gujarat, the Human Rights Watch reported more than 20 incidents of Churches being burnt down and damaged in and around the Dang District. The organisation also reported assaults against Christians, damages and burning down of Churches and Christian institutions in at least 25 villages all over Gujarat from 25 December 1998 to the next ten days. In the previous year 1997, 22 churches were burnt or destroyed, and another 16 in Gujarat alone.

=== 1999 Ranalai violence ===
The 1999 Ranalai violence occurred on 15 March 1999 in the village of Ranalai in Gajapati district of Orissa. The violence occurred after a dispute of adding religious symbols in the Khamani Hill of the village. A crowd of 2000 people, reportedly followers of the Sangh Parivar, armed with country made guns and weapons, completely burned down 157 Christian houses and looted the remaining Christian houses in the village. 14 Christians were injured including three injured by gunshots. An investigation by the National Commission for Minorities blamed the BJP for the violence.

=== 2007 Christmas violence in Kandhamal ===
An outbreak of violence started on 24 December 2007 at Bamunigam village of Kandhamal District between the Sangh-affiliated Kui Samaj together with the groups led by Sangh Parivar organizations and Christians where more than 100 churches and Christian institutions were burnt down or vandalized. 3 to 50 Christians were killed.

=== 2008 Kandhamal violence ===
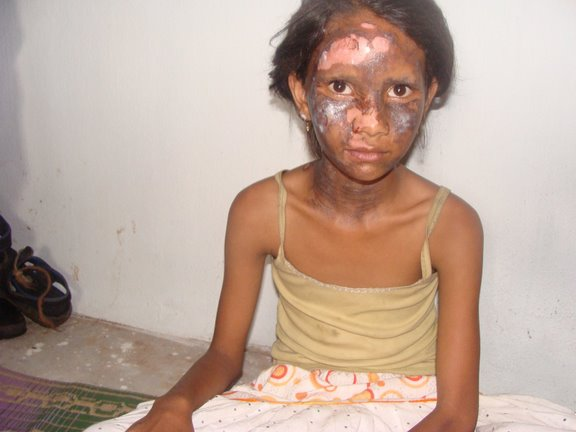
A young Christian girl who was bruised and burnt during the anti Christian violence. It occurred when a bomb was thrown into her house by the extremists.

The 2008 Kandhamal violence refers to widespread violence against Christians purportedly incited by Hindutva organisations in the Kandhamal district of Orissa, India, in August 2008 after the murder of the VHP leader Lakshmanananda Saraswati by seven Pano Catholics and one Maoist from Andhra Pradesh. According to government reports the violence resulted in at least 39 Christians killed and 3906 Christian houses completely destroyed. Reports state, more than 395 churches were razed or burnt down, over 5,600 – 6,500 houses plundered or burnt down, over 600 villages ransacked and more than 60,000 – 75,000 people left homeless. Reports put the death toll at nearly 100 and suggested more than 40 women were sexually assaulted. Unofficial reports place number of those killed to more than 500. Many Christian families were burnt alive. Thousands of Christians were forced to convert to Hinduism under threat of violence. This violence was led by the Bajrang Dal, Rashtriya Swayamsevak Sangh and the VHP.

After the riots, 20,000 people were sheltered in 14 government established relief camps and 50,000 people fled to the surrounding districts and states. The United States Commission on International Religious Freedom reported that by March 2009, and at least 3,000 individuals were still in government relief camps.

During the riots a nun was gang-raped and later paraded half-naked in the streets, the incident received wide media attention.

=== 2008 attacks on Christians in Southern Karnataka ===
In 2008, there was a wave of attacks directed against Christian churches and prayer halls in Karnataka by the Hindu organisation Bajrang Dal around 2008. The violence started from 14 September 2008 when about 20 churches were vandalised in Mangalore, Udupi, Chikkamagaluru, and in other districts of Karnataka. Minor violence was later reported from the border state of Kerala.The Christian leaders commented that BJP was inciting violence rather than working to calm the situation. On the other hand, the Central Government had strongly criticized and sent showcase notices to the state Government for not solving the issue effectively.

In October 2008, During the 2008 attacks on Christians in southern Karnataka the police reported 20 graves in a cemetery were desecrated in Tamil Nadu, three churches were stoned in the districts of Karur and Erode, bibles in the outer walls of Chennai and Coimbatore were damaged, a statue of Mary was stolen in Krishnagiri, a Virgin Mary icon was damaged in Kanyakumari and an idol of Jesus in Madurai was vandalized in the state of Tamil Nadu. Four members belonging to the Hindu Munnani were arrested on 9 October and the number reached 22 on the next day.

=== Manipur conflict (2023–present) ===
The Manipur Conflict is the ongoing conflict between tribal Kuki-Zo people, a majority Christian group, and Meitei people, a majority Hindu people. Despite the fact that the conflict was originally ethnic conflict, there has been elements of religious persecution. The conflict was marked by 400 churches burned and attacks on Meitei Christians by Meitei Hindus.

=== 2025 Christmas violence ===
The 2025 Christmas violence in India were marked by several reported incidents of violence, vandalism, and disruption across multiple states. These incidents occurred primarily in Christian institutions, prayer gatherings, and public decorations, often under the pretext of preventing alleged "religious conversions" or preserving "cultural awareness."

== Response ==
=== National Commission for Minorities ===
After the 2008 attacks on Christians in southern Karnataka by Bajrang Dal and Sri Ram Sena activists, the National Commission for Minorities accused the Karnataka government of serious lapses in handling the situation. They were found directly responsible for allowing the violence to spread, and claimed the police failed to solve the issue effectively as the violence continues. They also clarified that there were no reported complaints of forced conversion registered in the state.

=== National Integration Council of India ===
On 13 October 2008, the National Integration Council of India called a special meeting chaired by Manmohan Singh, then Prime Minister of India, where he condemned the violence of Hindu militant organisations such as Bajrang Dal, VHP etc. The prime minister had earlier publicly admitted that the ongoing violence against the Christian communities was a matter of great "national shame".

=== Human rights organizations ===
In July 2021, at least 17 human rights organizations including Amnesty International cosponsored a Congressional briefing in the Washington to request the US Government to take action against the growing persecution of Christians in India.

=== Vatican ===
On 12 October 2008, Pope Benedict XVI criticised the continuing anti-Christian violence in India. On 28 October, the Vatican called upon the memory of Mahatma Gandhi for an end to the religious violence in Orissa. In a written address to Hindus, the Vatican office said Christian and Hindu leaders needed to foster a belief in non-violence among followers.

=== US State Department ===
In its annual human rights reports for 1999, the United States Department of State criticised India for "increasing societal violence against Christians." The report on anti-Christian violence listed over 90 incidents of anti-Christian violence, ranging from damage of religious property to violence against Christians pilgrims. The incidents listed in the report were attributed to local media reports and information gathered by Christian groups in India.

== See also ==
- Detention of Malayali Nuns in Chhattisgarh
- Graham Staines
- Bilkis rape case
- Religious violence in India
- Violence against Muslims in India
- Religion in India
- Freedom of religion in India
- Persecution of Buddhists
- Persecution of Christians
- Persecution of Hindus
- Persecution of Muslims
- Pink chaddi campaign
- Communalism (South Asia)
- Hindutva
- Sri Ram Sena
- Saffron terror
- Shiv Sena
- 1998 attacks on Christians in southeastern Gujarat

== Sources ==
- Bauman, Chad M. (August 2013). "Hindu-Christian Conflict in India: Globalization, Conversion, and the Coterminal Castes and Tribes". The Journal of Asian Studies. 72 (3). Cambridge University Press: 633–653. doi:10.1017/S0021911813000569. ISSN 0021-9118. S2CID 53125427.
- Bauman, Chad M. (2015). Pentecostals, Proselytization, and Anti-Christian Violence in Contemporary India. Oxford University Press. ISBN 978-0-19-026631-8.
