= 1997–1999 anti-Christian violence in Gujarat =

Attacks directed against Christians and Christian places of worship

Anti-Christian violence in Gujarat
- Date: Late 1997 – early 1999
- Location: Southeastern Gujarat
- Caused by: Hate speech; mass mobilization; religious nationalism
- Goals: Ethnic and religious persecution
- Methods: Church arson; rioting; assault; looting; vandalizing; demolition

From late 1997 to early 1999, a wave of attacks against Christians occurred in and around Dangs district in southeastern Gujarat in India. The attacks reportedly started at the end of 1997, before peaking during the Christmas of 1998 after the anti-Christian rallies in the Dangs District by the Hindu Jagaran Manch. The attacks included assaults on and killings of Christians, attacks against Christian schools, institutions and shops, damages, demolition and burning down of prayer halls and churches mainly by members of the Bhartiya Janata Party, Vishva Hindu Parishad, Bajrang Dal and Hindu Jagran Manch.

Human Rights Watch reported that from 25 December 1988 to 3 January 1999, at least 20 prayer halls and churches had been damaged or burnt down and Christians and Christian institutions were attacked in Dangs and its surrounding districts and at least 25 villages had reported incidents of burning and damages to prayer halls and churches all over Gujarat.

Human Rights Watch reported that the majority of the incidents of violence occurred in 1998, the same year that the Bharatiya Janata Party (BJP) took control of the state.

== Background ==
There is a noise in the streets
That the Christians are thieves
Hindus rise
Christians run
Whoever gets in our way
Will be ground into dust.
Hindus are brothers
Praise mother India
Praise Lord Ram
Who will protect our faith?
Bajrang Dal, Bajrang Dal
Praise Lord Hanuman

— Translation of the slogans during the December 25, 1998 rally by Human Rights Watch.

Around 90% area of the Dangs district is covered by forests and 97% of the population in the district is tribal. The District was also called the "Cherrapunji of Gujarat" and "Kashmir of Gujarat" due to the negligence by the government of the state. The district also lacked electricity, roads and clean drinking water. The district is reported to be one of the most underdeveloped district in the state. The Missionaries were the first to start developmental works in the area from the early 20th century, which resulted in a steady growth of Christian Population. When more tribal voters converted to Christianity, they became targets for the right-wing groups.

Many incidents of attacks steadily started from November 1997 with assault, killings, distributing provocative pamphlets and hate speeches against Christians mostly by the Hindu Jagran Manch (HJM), Bhartiya Janata Party, Vishwa Hindu Parishad (VHP) and Bajrang Dal. On 25 December 1997, The Vishva Hindu Parishad organized an anti-Christian Rally in the village of Pipalwada, near the dang district. This was followed by a series of anti-Christian rallies in all districts of southern Gujarat by Bajrang Dal, VHP and Hindu Jagran Manch which continued for months. The messages of all the rallies were similar, the message is that the Hindus need to protect themselves from the deceiving acts of the missionaries and to "teach them a lesson".

On 25 December 1998, The HJM organized an anti-Christian rally in Ahwa town of Dangs district. More than 4000 people actively participated in the rally and shouted anti-Christian slogans under full police protection. Human Rights Watch reported a series of attacks began on Christians, their places of worship, Christian houses and schools, and shops owned by Muslims and Christians after the rally.

The investigations carried out by the Human Rights Watch, the Andhra Pradesh Civil Liberties Committee and the committee to Protect Democratic Rights (CPDR) reported that the attacks were started because of the hate campaign by Sangh Parivar groups since the beginning of 1998 by giving out hate pamphlets and organizing provocative rallys. The Human Rights Watch noted that a majority of the incidents of violence in 1998, the same year that the Bharatiya Janata Party took control of the state.

== Attacks ==
The Human Rights Watch reported that more than 20 Churches and prayer halls were destroyed or burnt down, many people were physically assaulted, tied up and beaten while the angry mobs took over and attacked their homes from 25 December 1998, to 3 January 1999, in the Dangs district and its surrounding districts. The Organisation reported that Churches and Christian buildings in at-least 25 villages in Gujarat were burnt down or destroyed during the ten days. One report recorded 108 incidents of attacks against Christians from April to August 1998 in Gujarat.

The United Christian Forum for Human Rights recorded 32 registered cases of violence against Christians from 1964 to 1996, 15 cases in 1997 and 90 registered cases in 1998.

Retired Judge of the Bombay High Court Justice S Suresh carried out an investigation and revealed that the attacks reportedly started around November 1997 when a priest in Kudas village was beaten up on 11 November 1997 and when 24 Christians from Umerpada were incriminated in false cases on 14 November 1999. On 26 December 1999, people celebrating Christmas were stoned and harassed the entire night in the Dagadpada Village and were later sent to jail.

The attacks slowly started occurring all over 1998 before peaking during Christmas.

- On 20 February, worshippers in a prayer hall were physically assaulted with sticks by the village heads and the police during their prayers in Divan Tembrum.
- On 5 March, members of the VHP brought two blind persons to a Pentecostal church, demanded them to be healed, then went on to desecrate the stage, amplifiers and microphones in the church and assaulted the participants.
- On 15 April, witnesses reported a crowd of about 400 people which included the VHP, the police, and members of the local BJP government used iron bars and tractors to demolish the St. Antony's Catholic Church and several other affiliated buildings in Naroda. The crowd also destroyed the icons and stole the donations from the donation box.
- In May, Christians attending a convention event were attacked in Jorsod.
- On 21 June, a prayer hall was burnt down late at the night in the Singhana Village.
- On 26 June, a prayer hall was burned in the Lahan Kadmal village at about 8:30 p.m.
- On 29 June, a prayer hall in Umerpada was attacked by attackers who failed to set it on fire.
- In July, a prayer hall was damaged in Dholidod, a prayer hall in Bobkhal was attempted to burned down and several Christians were attacked during their prayers in Padalkhadi.
- On 8 July, according to witnesses, local VHP leaders dug out a Methodist man's corpse from a cemetery in Kapadvanj and dumped the body near his church.
- On 16 July, the Jesuit Priest run Shantiniketan High School was broken in and stoned in Zankhvav. The School's playground was also ploughed by a tractor.
- On 18 July, a church was burnt down and the local Christians were harassed in the Bhapkal Village.
- On 23 July, Hindutva activists along with a revenue official allegedly attacked tribals in a prayer hall with sticks and later false cases were filed on the victims.
- On 9 August, RSS members demolished a church in Ahmedabad.
- On August, Christian families were beaten up at Morjira and Jamniamal.
- On November, Several prayer halls were burnt down in Subir, Kamath, Borigouda, Lahancharia and Nirgudmal.
- On 4 November, a church in the Borigautha Village was attacked, its surrounding structures were set on fire and Christian tribals were robbed. On the same day a church in the village of Gadhvi was burnt down.
- On 11 November, several Christians including a sick woman were beaten up and several Christian families were forced to go through a "reconversion ritual" in the Unai-hot springs in Dahunia village of the Dangs district. The head of the village council prevented the Christians from taking water from the village well and from working in any government projects. The village head also banned the Christians to have their livestock graze with the livestock of others.
- On 14 November, a prayer hall in Lahancharia was partly burned.
- On 4 December, more than 35,000 Christians rallied in the streets of Ahmedabad protesting against the attacks on the Christians in Gujarat and other parts of the country.

=== The ten-day violence in the Dangs District ===
The ten-day anti-Christian attacks
- Violence against Christians and Christian places of worship in Dangs district for 10 days
- Date: 25 December 1998 – 3 January 1999
- Location: Dang district, Gujarat
- Caused by: Hate speech; mass mobilization; religious nationalism
- Goals: Ethnic and religious persecution
- Methods: Church arson; rioting; assault; looting; vandalizing; demolition

Casualties and losses
Damages to Churches and prayer halls	At-least 20 burned down or damages in and around the Dang; At-least 25 Villages reported Church burnings and damages all over the state.

On 15 December, The Hindu Jagran Manch started to distribute provocative pamphlets against the Christians of the Dangs district, calling people for its rally in the Ahwa town of the Dangs district on 25 December. The local dailies, Sandesh and Gujarat Samachar also carried on the message about the upcoming anti-Christian rally by the HJM, previously these newspapers together with the NavGujarat Samay carried out a series of provocative articles against the Christian priests.

On 25 December, more than 4000 people actively participated in the rally mostly HJM activists from outside Ahwa, they shouted anti-Christian slogans in-front of the watching police. The rally started at around 11:30 am and the participants circled around the town, shouting provocative slogans against Christians along the Christian institutions celebrating Christmas. The district collector Bharat Joshi was also present in a convocation at the center of the town by the participants, later on that day. The Citizen's commission reported slogans like "Hindus Awake, Christians flee" were used during the rally.

The rally climaxed at about 5 pm at a local school ground where another round of hate speeches openly calling for violence against the Christians were going on. After the rally the HJM crowd pelted stones at several tribal Christians who were mostly women at a market, injuring three women and a child. Instigated by the speech, the HJM crowd split into two groups, one group went to a nearby CNI Church which resulted in violence as the tribal leaders stood up to protect it and ended with police intervention. The other group which was a mob of about 120 went to the Dheep Darshan high school and pelted stones which damaged the window panes and the roof of the boys' hostel. Another mob at 8 p.m arrived at the Navjyot High School in Subir, the mob first destroyed the school's jeep, Christmas decorations and beat up two priests and then went on to attack and burn a building where the food grain for the students was stored. Later, several other mobs went on to attack and damage several Shops owned by Muslims and Christians.

On the night of 25 December, the rally participants began destroying churches and prayer halls and attacking Christians at the villages surrounding the Ahwa town and some were forcibly taken to the Unai hot springs for a re-conversion ritual. According to witnesses, about 800 men armed with tridents set fire to a church in the Jamlapada village and also attacked and looted several houses On the same day a mob of about 200 people attacked and looted the house of a Tribal Christian. Around midnight, a mob of around 50 people attacked a tribal Christian in Galkund and allegedly robbed another man in Jamalpada. A mob of 200 people demolished and burnt a Church in the Gadhvi Village and the same group allegedly set fire to another church at the Jamalapada village.

A mob pelted stones against the Christian houses and churches at about 12:30 a.m damaging the roof tiles. A mob of around 60-80 people damaged the roof tiles of a Church in Nagalkhadi at about 8 p.m. A large mob set a church on fire before trying to demolish it in Padalkhaid.

On 26 December, a mob of 500 armed with tridents, iron bars and heavy-sticks set fire to a church on Waki, a tribal Christian and his family members were assaulted in Galkund. On the same day at about 12:30 a.m, a mob pelted stones on several Christian houses in Divan Temrun Village. A mob attacked and made serious damages to several Churches in the villages of Karadiamba and Bahdun. On the same day six churches in different areas of the Dangs district were demolished.

On 27 December, tribal Christians were tied up and beaten in the villages of Dongiamba and Pipayambal. On the same day, Churches in the Villages of Raochand, Baripada, Mulchond, Barda and Lahankadmal were set on fire. Several Prayer halls and Churches in the village of Karenjpada, Shivbara, Pipaldaghad, and Sepuamba were also attacked and left badly damaged.

On 28 December, tribal Christians who went to a police station to report about an attack were threatened of grave repercussions. On the same day, a mob damaged two Christian houses in Savardakasad.

On 29 December, a church in the village of Mathabari was badly damaged by the mob.

On 30 December, members belonging to the Bajrang Dal attacked several tribal Christians, tore their bibles, robbed them and threatened them of dire consequences if they did not leave Christianity in Kattis. On the same day a Church was attacked in Jhalsol along with 4 other Christians. A mob led by the HJM tried to set a church on fire in Jalsod and another church in Naktiyanuvat was badly damaged by the fundamentalists of the HJM.

Together there were at least 20 incidents of church and prayer halls being burnt down and damaged in and around the Dang district from 25 December 1998, to 3 January 1999, as reported by the Human Rights Watch. Several church burnings and damages to places of worship including assaults against Christians and damages to Christian institutions were reported in at least 25 villages around the Dangs during the ten days of violence.

On 1 January, the HJM attacked a church in Kasadbari and set fire to it. On 3 January, HJM activists severely damaged several Christian Houses at Naktiyanuvat.

== Investigations ==
Human Rights Watch and several other organisations blamed the hate campaign by the Sangh parivar groups for the violence in the state and also mentioned about the attacks peaking at 1998 when the BJP took over the state in the same year. The Organization accused the local media in propagating inflammatory news against Christians and exploiting communal differences to meet Political ends. It also blamed the central government's inefficiency in providing protection to the minorities. One of the most used accusations of the right-wing groups against the priests and Christian institutions was "forcible conversions" of Hindus to Christianity, which was denied by the Christians. However, during its investigations the Human rights Watch found no proof of forced conversions anywhere.

We demolished 30 churches and built temples. There was some commotion.

— Swami Aseemanand,

An erstwhile Rashtriya Swayamsevak Sangh member, Vijay Moray, told Human Rights Watch that the Hindu Jagran Manch (HJM) and Swami Aseemanand went to 311 villages in the Dangs district to spread propaganda and the Hindutva groups have been devising this campaign in south-eastern Gujarat for years. Human Rights Wartch also found out that there was an increase in the forcible conversion of Christians after Swami Aseemanand came to dangs during the early 1998. He is also credited for founding the conversion ritual in the Unai hot springs by which Christian tribals in the district were taken to Asheemanad's ashram and then to the hot springs in Unai where they were made to forcibly convert to Hinduism which is mainly done by the HJM. They claim it as a reconversion ritual while the tribals were animist spirit worshippers to begin with During an interview, Aseemanand claimed to have converted forty-thousand Christians and demolished 30 Churches from mid December 1998 to January 1999.

The committee to Protect Democratic Rights and the Andhra Pradesh Civil Liberties Committee in October 1998 reported that a well planned programme is being carried out by the Sangh Parivar to communalise the state of in Gujarat and to convert the tribal people in the tribal-belt of South Gujarat to Hinduism. The youth of Bajrang dal are taught to execute operations secretly and deny any knowledge when communal outbursts take place. The attacks on Christians and their Churches are the part of this programme.

The Communanlism Combat reported that, even though several Christian organisations and NGOs had warned the district collector Bharat Joshi and Deputy superintendent of police Rajan Gaikwad to not allow the rally on the day of Christmas as it could end in trouble due to the church burnings in the past month. The District collector gave permission for the rally only on the particular day and even attended a part of the rally.

Several fact-finding organizations including the Citizens Commission on Human Rights, United Christian Forum for Human Rights, National Commission for Minorities have attributed the Violence to the increasing presence of Hindutva groups in the area. The NCM also reported that the damages in the violence very mostly one-sided because the impoverished tribal Christians did not resist to the attacks.

The United States Commission on International Religious Freedom said that the violence against the minorities is coincided with the rise of the Political parties affiliated to the Sangh Parivar. It also reported that the rise of the Bharatiya Janata Party in 1998 has helped encouraged a climate for the extremists who have started to believe that violence against the religious minorities will not be punished systematically.

The area around Subir was said to be one of the most affected areas during the anti-Christian Riots of 1998.

== Reactions ==
=== Political response ===
The Congress accused the Bharatiya Janata Party of trying to increase its vote banks by attacking minorities. INC politician Sharad Pawar accused the BJP of trying to divide people on the basis of religion.

The Inter Press Service reported that the Christians are being used as a political scapegoat for India's national elections.

The former President of the AIADMK and Chief Minister of Tamil Nadu, J. Jayalalithaa called for the dismissal of the Bharatiya Janata Party's rule in Gujarat. She also went on to say that Gujarat attacks have become a black mark to the fair name of the country.

Digvijaya Singh from the Samata Party condemned the incidents are destroying the country's spirit of tolerance.

Prime Minister Atal Bihari Vajpayee visited the Dangs district on 10 January 1999 and criticized the Government of Gujarat for failing to ban the rally on Christmas. He also ordered the Gujarati government to take action against the attackers.

Telugu Desam Party's leader V. S Rao said the home ministry acts like a "passive onlooker" when Christians were being attacked in Gujarat for the past three months.

=== Religious response ===
Rev. Anand Muttungal of the Catholic Bishops Conference of Madhya Pradesh said the attacks could be a response to increased and favorable coverage of Christians and Churches in television channels and newspapers during the Christmas season. He claimed that since right-wing extremists can't tolerate this, they went on to attack.

The Official Spokesperson for the Vatican Delhi Embassy said that Vatican is extremely concerned and disturbed about the attacks against Christians in the country.

== See also ==
- 2007 Christmas violence in Kandhamal
- 2008 Kandhamal violence
- Violence against Christians in India
