= 1998 Ramgiri-Udaygiri violence =

Violence in Odisha, India

- Date: 8 December 1998
- Location: Ramgiri-Udaygiri, Gajapati district, Odisha.
- Caused by: Mass mobilization
- Methods: Arson; Looting *Murder

Casualties
- Injuries: 20 policemen
- Arrested: 27
- Damage: Several government vehicles torched
- Buildings destroyed: 92 - 111 Christian houses burned down; 2 Churches burned down; Police station partially burned

The 1998 Ramgiri-Udaygiri violence was an incident of violence that took place in the town of Ramgiri-Udaygiri in Gajapati District, Odisha on December 8, 1998. Two prisoners who were arrested for dacoity were murdered by a mob of 5000 tribal people after breaking into the sub-jail. In a separate case, a mob of 500 people looted and burned down 92 to 111 Christian houses and 2 Churches on the same day. 27 people were arrested.

The rivalry between two trade unions, one known as Mozdur Sangha led by a Christian man and the other Utkal Sangha started by a local leader of the Rashtriya Swayamsevak Sangh (RSS) started communal tensions between both the communities in the town. The leader of the Mozdur Sangha who had a criminal record was arrested for looting a bus which carried tribal people to their work. The agitated tribal people staged various demonstrations on December 6 and December 7 to get back their money and to take the arrested men to a people's court. On December 8 they attacked the sub-jail as they found their demands were not taken seriously by the local administration. After this, a mob attacked the Christian settlement unexpectedly. All of the arrested were Sangh Parivar activists, members of the Utkal Sangh and members politically close to Vanavasi Kalyan Ashram and other Sangh-affiliates.

The investigation by the All India Federation of Organizations for Democratic Rights reported both were separated incidents. The investigation reported that the Sangh Parivar and the Utkal Sangh seized the opportunity of the agitation by the tribal people to attack the Christian settlement.

== Background ==
Ramgiri-Udaygiri is a small town in the Gajapati District of Odisha. Ramgiri-Udaygiri and the district of Gajapati's population is dominated by tribal people with a population density of 151 per km^{2}. The literacy rate of the district is 24 percent and its share of the rural population is almost 90 percentage. Of the 3016 km^{2} geographical area of the district, there is only 76,671 hectares of farmland. The area is full of forests and hills. Forests represent more than 70 per cent of the geographical area of the district. The major portion of the region is hilly terrain.

Agriculture is the primary means of living. The tribal people participate in their traditional cultivation techniques and gathering natural products from the forest. A small portion of the population are involved in the few small scale and cottage industries, which have a huge effect on people's lives, in the absence of real industry.

Very often, the tribal people are displaced from their lands and driven deep into the forest. This is the primary point of conflict between both the area's tribal people and non-tribal people.

=== Trade unions ===
According to the report of the All India Federation of Organizations for Democratic Rights, a limited number of day-to-day wage workers are employed in "khalasi" (head load) jobs in and around Ramgiri-Udaygiri. These workers have a trade union named "Mozdur Sangha". Jaya Singh, a Christian, was the president of the union. In the starting, all the Khalasi workers had been part of this union. Jaya Singh, along with his gang, had a criminal record. For a long time, he had been involved in various lawless activities known to the local police. He was also active in the illegal liquor trading and competed with another illegal liquor trader, who was a renowned Sangh Parivar activist. This rivalry is reported to have caused tensions between the Christians and the Hindus in the region.

In 1996, Laxmi Bhai, a local leader of the Rashtriya Swayamsevak Sangh (RSS), succeeded in establishing a new union named as Utkal Sangh. All the Savarna Hindu workers joined him. But the Dalit workers had stayed in the old union. From then on, the competition between both the unions and fomenting hatred between the Savarna Hindus and the Christians began.

The RSS leader, Laxmi Bhai forced Mozdur Sangha workers to leave their jobs due to a dispute between the two unions over contract work. There was a lot of tension in the area. The local administration interfered and mediated the problem. Several people in and around the town reported that Sangh Parivar was involved in various communal activities during this time.

=== Bus robbing incident and tribal agitation ===
Some people robbed a private bus carrying some of the contract workers to Arunachal Pradesh, 2 km away from the Ramgiri-Udaygiri Police station. It has been claimed that around ₹ 63,000 was stolen. Next day the tribal people began their agitation under the leadership of Chasi Mulia Samiti's, an Adivasi organisation. They demanded that the Tahsildar arrest all the alleged perpetrators that they had identified and that their cash including the bus fare, be returned to them. Jaya Singh, the president of the Mozdur Sangha and another man who was a Hindu, were arrested and brought into custody, but with the aid of the local government, the owner of the bus managed to flee along with his bus, which angered the agitating tribal people.

The Chasi Mulia Samiti demonstrated in different parts of the city from December 4 to December 6. At about 10.30 a.m. on December 7, the Chasi Mulia Samiti had a public rally in the town's weekly market premises where around 8,000 individuals from 150 villages took part. They then went the local police station and demanded that two men who had been arrested be produced to be prosecuted in a people's court. They encircled the station from 11 am to 2 pm and left with a warning that if there was no solution by 8 December, the people would take matters into their own hands. The local government sought to arm itself with reinforcements from outside the district.

== Attack on sub-jail ==
On December 8 at about 10 am, the whole town was overwhelmed and under the stranglehold of the tribal people. Around 5000 people gathered in front of the police station, equipped with traditional weapons. They had already obstructed roadways at least in 10 to 12 locations the night before by blocking them with trees. A large number of local people also reportedly participated with the tribal people. According to the All India Federation of Democratic Rights Organizations, the tribal people had gathered without any representatives of the Chasi Mulia Samiti.

The mob reportedly reached the subjail at about 10.40 a.m. and encircled the building. They broke the prison walls in four locations. There were 35 male prisoners in the prison and all the prisoners were threatened to leave. They then murdered Jaya Singh, the president of Mozdur Sangha, and another man. Their corpses were dragged by wires from telephones and then brought on a trolley to the police station. The two bodies were taken inside the police station and they were burned there along with the police records. The station's entire staff were simply silent spectators. They also burned down a portion of the police station and burned down several government vehicles. 20 policemen were injured during the attack. After this the tribal agitation ended.

== Attack on Christian settlement ==
The same day the Christian settlement was unexpectedly attacked by a mob of about 500 people. With the aid of petrol and kerosene, about 111 houses belonging to the Christians were looted first and were eventually burned down. Two churches were burned down as well. Other reports stated 92 houses were burnt down. The houses that were burned down were not related to Jaya Singh. Eight houses in the same area belonging to Hindu Dalit families were left intact. The entire attack had completed by afternoon.

== Investigations ==
The local government, the police station and the Christians stated that it was not the tribal villagers, but some locals in the town who had organized and engaged in the attack. The Chasi Mulia Samiti's involvement in the attack was denied by the Christians, the local people and the local government. While, the Chasi Mulia Samiti blamed the local leaders of RSS and the Bharatiya Janata Party (BJP) of having seized the opportunity to terrorize the Christian community using the excuse of Jaya Singh. Local people said that the BJP leaders were instrumental in burning down the Christian settlement and the culprits were free even after they had reported to the civil administration and the police. People also reported that the Vishva Hindu Parishad (VHP) and the RSS were active in the area and were inciting the people against the Christians.

Chief Minister Giridhar Gomang told the State Assembly in March 1999 that a single-man commission, led by retired Judge from Orissa High Court Kishore Chandra Jagdeb Ray, will investigate the issue. Gomang also said the commission will now also be asked to investigate the 1999 Ranalai violence.

The Orissa Chief Minister, told the state Assembly in March 1998 that five officials the circle Inspector of police, Additional District Magistrate, a Deputy Superintendent of Police, the officer-in-charge of the police station and the Assistant Sub-Inspector of police were suspended for negligence of duty.

=== All India Federation of Organizations for Democratic Rights ===
According to the All India Federation of Organizations for Democratic Rights, the agitation of the tribal people was combined with this mob assault on Christians in the media coverage of the event.

The investigation by the All India Federation of Organizations for Democratic Rights concluded that the murder of the jail inmates was not communal in nature as Jaya Singh was a Christian and the other man was a Hindu. While the looting and burning down Christian houses was a separate incident associated with the Sangh Parivar and the Utkal Sangh. The communal forces took the opportunity to attack Christians. The investigation also reported that the government and the law and order machinery failed to take early actions against the Sangh Parivar, despite knowing the early indications of their motive.

== Arrests ==
Twenty-seven people were arrested for murder and arson. 21 of the 27 are Savarna Hindus, who were also members of Utkal Sangha, the rival of Mozdur Sangha. Out of the remaining six people, three were known Sangh Parivar activists, and the remaining three were tribal people who were politically close to the Sangh Parivar and its Vanvasi Kalyan Parishad.

11 of the prisoners who had fled from the sub-jail were rearrested by police.

== Reactions ==
Prime Minister of India Atal Bihari Vajpayee said that the violence was a very serious incident and said it was a warning to the whole nation. He also said that he had asked the home ministry to investigate whether the VHP had a role in the attacks.

== Bibliography ==
- Puniyani, Ram (2006). The politics behind anti Christian violence : a compilation of investigation committee reports into acts of violence against the Christian minorities. Delhi: Media House. ISBN 81-7495-237-3. OCLC 182969294.
- All India Federation of Organisations for Democratic Rights (1999). Then They Came for the Christians: A Report to the Nation : Report of an All-India Fact Finding Team, Constituted by All India Federation of Organisations for Democratic Rights (AIFOFDR). All India Federation of Organisations for Democratic Rights. (Available online)
- Bagchi, Subrata Sankar (2012). Human Rights and the Third World: Issues and Discourses. Lexington Books. ISBN 978-0-7391-7736-5.
