= 2008 Kandhamal violence =

Anti-Christian violence in Orissa

- Part of Religious violence in Odisha
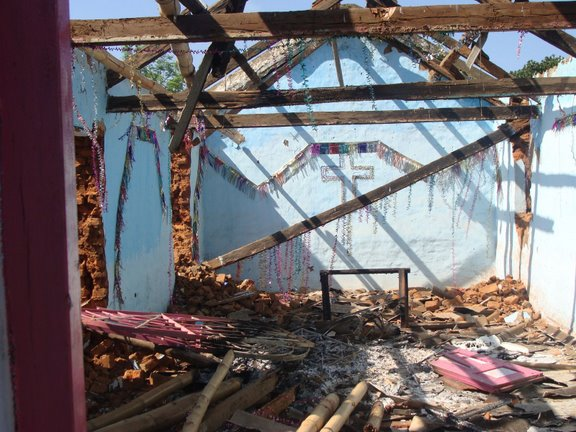
- Remains of a church property burnt down during communal violence in Orissa in August 2008
- Date: 25 August 2008 – 28 August 2008 (4 days)
- Location: Kandhamal district, Orissa; 20.47°N 84.23°E
- Caused by: Murder of Lakshmanananda Saraswati, hate speech, Hindu Extremism, Christophobia
- Methods: Church arson, mass killing, looting
- Result: See aftermath

Casualties and damages
- Deaths: estimates range from 39 to more than 500
- Injuries: 18,000; 40+ women sexually assaulted
- Damages: 395+ churches burnt down or demolished; 60,000 – 75,000+ left homeless; 5,600 – 6,500+ houses ransacked or burnt down; 600+ villages ransacked
- Location within India

The 2008 Kandhamal violence was the violence against Christians incited by Hindutva organisations in the Kandhamal district of Orissa, India, in August 2008 after the murder of Lakshmanananda Saraswati, a leader of the Vishva Hindu Parishad, a right-wing Hindutva group. According to government reports the violence resulted in at least 39 Christians killed. Reports indicate that more than 395 churches were razed or torched, between 5,600 and 6,500 houses plundered or burnt down, over 600 villages ransacked and more than 60,000 – 75,000 people left homeless. Other reports put the death toll at nearly 100 and suggested more than 40 women were sexually assaulted. Unofficial reports placed the number of those killed at more than 500. Many Christian families were burnt alive. Thousands of Christians were forced to convert to Hinduism under threat of violence. Many Hindu families were also assaulted in some places because they supported the Indian National Congress (INC). This violence was led by Hindutva paramilitary organisations, those being the Bajrang Dal, the Rashtriya Swayamsevak Sangh, and the Vishva Hindu Parishad.

Tensions reportedly started with violent incidents over Christmas 2007 which resulted in the burning of over 100 churches and church institutions, including hostels, convents, and over 700 houses. Three persons were also killed during the three days after Christmas. The Hindutva groups and activists of the Kui Samaj were mostly involved in the 2007 attacks. Following the riots, 20,000 people were sheltered in 14 government established relief camps and 50,000 people fled to the surrounding districts and states. The United States Commission on International Religious Freedom reported that by March 2009, at least 3,000 individuals were still in government relief camps.

Manoj Pradhan, an MLA of the Bharatiya Janata Party was convicted in the violence in 2010. 18 people were also convicted in the same year. Seven Christians and a Maoist leader were convicted for the murder of Lakshmanananda Saraswati on 2013.

== Background ==
Hateful anti-Christian campaigns in Kandhamal had already begun in the late 1960s, and continued for a long time, creating violence against minorities at frequent intervals including the 1980s, 1990s and 2000s.

=== Kandha–Pana tensions ===
The Kandhamal district houses more than 100,000 Christians, 60% of them converts from the Scheduled Castes (SC) who are locally called Pana Christians (Pana). They speak Kui language, like tribal Kondhs or Kandhas. The district has been ethnically divided for decades between the tribal Kui-speaking Kandha tribals, and lower caste Kui-speaking Panas, who occupy a dominant position in their society. The Kui Samaj or the Kui association claimed to represent all the Kandha tribals, who were nearly 52% of the population in the district

The tribal Khonds historically followed animism before they converted to Hinduism. The tribal Panas, too, followed animism before their conversion to Christianity by Christian missionaries.

According to the Constitution, reservation benefits are removed from SCs who convert, and the Pana Christians demanded Scheduled tribe (ST) status after the Presidential Order of 2002 which mentioned the Kui tribes in the ST category since they also speak the Kui language. This was opposed by the VHP, the Kui Samaj and other political leaders who depend on Hindu tribals to support their vote bank in the area. These tensions soon transformed into communal violence.

The Kui Samaj called for a shutdown on December 25, 2007, to protest against allowing ST caste status to SC Pana Christians. With the shutdowns on Christmas Day, Christians, Christian institutions and Churches were targeted by activists belonging to the Kui Samaj and the VHP. Christians were killed and churches were burnt and damaged in the violence. It slowly calmed down till the murder of Swami Lakshmanananda, which created a massacre during August 2008. The National Commission for minorities reported that the tensions between the Kandha and the Pana tribals were partly responsible for the agitation and violence.

=== Sangh Parivar ===
A senior Home Department official said that the present struggle between the mostly Christian-Dalit Panas and the Kandh tribe, mostly pro-Hindus, was the outcome of the ethnic, social and religious divide that helped Maoists to set up their base. While over 1200 churches and 400 Christian institutions became an eyesore for Hindutava forces, conversion was also a strong issue that had helped Sangh Parivar to strengthen its roots in Odisha.

American political scientist Paul Brass argued that the generally insignificant, local communal conflicts in India are made into larger communal violence by groups he terms as 'conversion specialists'. In his book Constructing Indian Christianities: Culture, Conversion and Caste, Chad M. Bauman argued that the Sangh Parivar leaders followed the same technique in the Kandhamal riots by linking local politics and clashes with broader national fears like extinction of Hinduism, a Christian demographic increase and even a 'Christian military coup', thereby providing justification for anti-Christian violence and also issuing a 'national call to arms' for the defense of the Khandamal Hindus.

=== December 2007 violence ===
Human Rights Watch reported that the first wave of violence occurred on December 24, 2007, during an ice argument between Christians and Hindus over Christmas celebrations in the Kandhamal district. A Christian group attacked a vehicle belonging to VHP leader Lakshmanananda Saraswati and in retaliation 19 churches were completely burned down and razed. Hindutva groups and the activists of the Kui Samaj were mostly involved in the 2007 attacks.

The Kui Samaj and the VHP called for a bandh on December 25 to protest against the granting of ST status to the Pana Christians. The VHP also called for a bandh on Christmas Day for the attack on Lakshmananda's car. This led to Clashes between both the groups which continued for days where 837 families lost their houses. A mob of 500 strong attackers also torched a police station and burned the police vehicles and a Congress parliamentarian's house was also attacked. Saffron activists and Kui tribals who opposed the tribal status to the predominantly Christian Pana tribals joined in the attacks. According to various Non-Governmental Organizations, the VHP exploited the tensions between the Kui Samaj and Pana Christians to propel the Christmas attacks.

From December 24 to 27, 2007, at least three persons were killed and over 100 churches and church institutions, including convents and hostels, about 700 houses and other structures were burnt during the riots.

On 1 January 2008 further violence was reported at several places. Police said at least 20 houses and shops were torched at Phiringia, Khajuripada, Gochapada and Brahmanigaon by rioters.

=== Murder of Swami Lakshmanananda ===
On the evening of Saturday, 23 August 2008, unknown militants entered into the Ashram at around 8.00 p.m. and fired bullets from an AK-47 at Laxmanananda Saraswati at Jalespata Vanabashi Kanyashram in Kandhmal District of Orissa. After killing him, the proxy militants allegedly also cut various parts of his body by chisel and axe. Others who tried to rescue the Swami, namely Sadhwi Bhakti Mata who was overall charge of the Kalyan Ashram, Kishore Baba, Amritanand Baba and a visitor guardian of an inmate of the school, were also killed. The dead body of Bhakti Mata was also defaced and ripped by brutal cut injuries. The attackers, estimated at thirty gunmen, were suspected of being Maoist insurgents but the Sangh Parivar family blamed it upon local Christian evangelical groups. Both the manner of attack and a letter found at the attack provided the basis for this. The government announced a special investigative probe into the attack.

Christians have killed Swamiji. We will give a befitting reply.

— Gouri Prasad Rath, VHP state general secretary,

While the government held the Maoist insurgents of being responsible for the attacks, the Sangh Parivar groups blamed the incident on the Christians. The VHP state general secretary, Gouri Ram Prasad blamed the murder on the Christians and also said that the organization would retaliate on the Christians and also called for a ban on churches in the district.

In October 2008, a senior Maoist leader claimed responsibility for the murder of Laxmanananda and police officials confirmed that the Maoists trained youth in the tribal community to murder Laxmanananda.

== Kandhamal riots ==
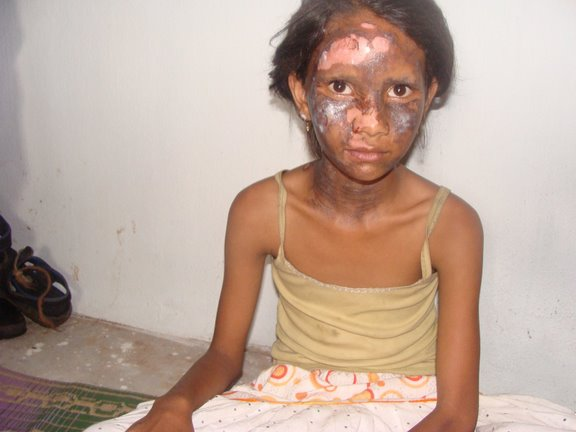
A young Christian girl who was bruised and burnt during the anti Christian violence. It occurred when a bomb was thrown into her house by the extremists.

At the midnight of August 23–24, hours after VHP chief Lakshmanananda Saraswati was killed, the chaos began. The police suspected the role of Maoists and announced it to the media at 11:00 pm. The news spread quickly and activists from Sangh Parivar groups, including the VHP and Bajrang Dal, erected barriers in several locations including Cuttack and Bhubaneswar. The police theory of suspected Maoist involvement was denied by Sangh Parivar leaders who accused militant Christians of murdering Lakshmanananda. On August 23, about midnight, demonstrators burned down a private bus and also damaged many churches.

The VHP and Bajrang Dal called for a statewide shutdown on Monday, 25 August 2008. Activists from the BJP, VHP, the Hindu Jagarana Samukhya and the Bajrang Dal staged protests and blocked traffic in nearly all district headquarters towns in the next morning demanding the detention of the Lakshmananda's killers. Businesses, banks and all schools and universities stayed closed as directed by the government. The police in the state stood mostly as silent observers to the harassment of those who had stepped out of their homes during the bandh. On the same day, rioters attacked a Christian orphanage at Khuntpalli village in Bargarh district. A local Hindu woman employee in her 20s was gang-raped and burnt alive by the mob after she was mistaken for a Christian, when the orphanage was set on fire.

The funeral procession which passed through hundreds of villages, was organized from Lakshmanananda's ashram at Jalespata to Chakapad. The procession began on the noon of August 24 and ended at the afternoon of the next day after stopping for the night at Phulbani. The event was attended by Sangh Parivar leaders, including Suresh Pujari, the State BJP's president. Hundreds of people assembled along the way to pay their last respects. Enraged mobs there assaulted Christians in the towns that the procession went through. Christians who were considered to be supporters of Congress were assaulted everywhere and many Hindus were also assaulted in some places because they supported the congress. The attackers included the BJP, VHP, Bajrang Dal and other Sangh Parivar groups and the Biju Janata Dal.

There is no place for Christians. If Christians don't become Hindus, they have to go. We don't care where they go. They must leave Orissa.

— VHP leader Pravin Togadia

Hindu mobs angered by the murders allegedly incited by Manoj Pradhan, an elected state legislator from the BJP, set fire to many Christian settlements. VHP chief Pravin Togadia travelled across the state inciting violence. Christians who demanded tribal status they belonged to Scheduled Castes on the basis of their shared Kui language with the Kandha tribal people, were also attacked. No effort was made by the police on service to stop the demonstrators from targeting Christians and their properties. The Kui Samaj, a Kandha tribal organisation which opposed this joined with the Sangh Parivar and the ruling alliance on the attacks. The government officials and government offices were attacked and police and civil administration vehicles were damaged by the demonstrators. In the entire district, prohibition orders were tightened and curfews were enforced.

Neighbors became rivals in many areas and burned Christian families alive. The houses belonging to the Christians who escaped into the nearby woods and hills were also robbed and torched by people from the surrounding villages. Many of the victims stayed up to seven days hidden in the jungles and came out only when the police found them and reassured them of protection. Soon, the relief camps set up by the government wasn't enough to house the homeless. People were inquiring about the whereabouts of their loved ones in the overpopulated camps, 10 days after the riots.

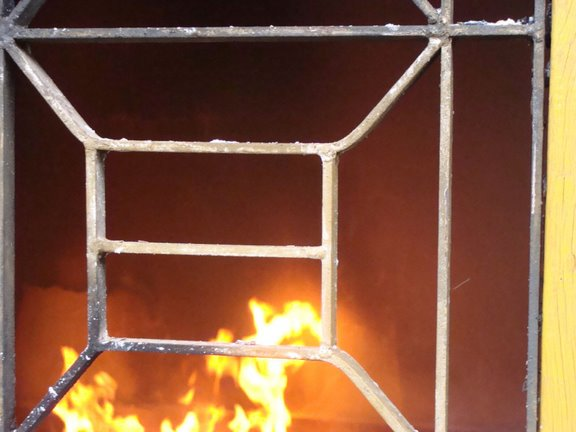
A Christian institution in flames during the violence by Hindu Nationalists

The violence was led by the Bajrang Dal, VHP and the RSS. The Government of Orissa and police, military and paramilitary forces deployed in the state failed to respond efficiently, effectively or appropriately. The VHP claimed that Hindu people in the area had taken the death of the Swami "very seriously, and now they are going to pay them back." A curfew was imposed in all towns in Kandhamal. Despite this, violence continued in Phulbani, Tumudibandh, Baliguda, Udaygiri, Nuagaon and Tikabali towns. Many others fled into the jungle or into neighbouring districts and states. All nine towns in Kandhamal district were under a curfew, and the police had license to shoot. Curfew was also imposed in Jeypore town of Odisha's Koraput district. Five police personnel were injured in mob violence. The state government sought additional paramilitary forces to combat the continuing violence.

About 2,000 Christians are estimated to have been forced to leave their religion in the violence. Thousands of Christians were herded into temples and were forced to perform conversion rituals with their heads shaved, according to a fact-finding tribunal led by Justice AP Shah. As a gesture of purification, the Christians were made to consume water mixed with Cow-dung and some were forced to damage churches and burn bibles to demonstrate that they had abandoned Christianity. As required by the anti-conversion law, they were made to sign "voluntary statements" asserting that they are now willingly becoming Hindus. District authorities said they had received dozens of complaints of forced conversions to Hinduism. Some victims have put saffron flags atop their home to prevent any future attacks and those sheltered in the refugee camps have been told they can go home only if they become Hindus.

During the riots, some small villages in rural areas were targeted by extremists. They killed the pastor of Mukundapur, a small village in Gajapati District. Hindus have also been attacked by members of their own faith, for having Christian relatives. One woman, who is herself a Hindu, says she was gang-raped by her grandparents' neighbors due to her uncle's refusal to renounce his Christian beliefs.

=== Continued violence ===
On 1 September 2008 the state government of Odisha claimed that the situation was under control. However, several houses and places of worship were burnt in the riots, especially in worst-hit Kandhamal district. 12,539 people were fed in relief camps, 783 people were fed in two relief camps in Rayagada district. In all, 12 companies of para-military forces, 24 platoons of Odisha State Armed Police, two sections of Armed Police Reserve forces and two teams of Special Operation Group (Odisha) (SOG) were deployed to control the riots.

On 4 September 2008 a group of nearly 2500 extremists barged into the Tikabali Government High School Relief Camp shouting at the Christian refugees and took away supplies meant for the refugees, while police remained as silent spectators. On the same day, over 300 VHP incited tribal women attacked a relief camp for the Christian riot victims in Tikabali, demanding food, employment and relief for non-Christian population, who they said had been starving following the 12-day-old curfew order clamped by the district administration to contain communal violence.

On 7 September 2008 VHP leader Praveen Togadia announced that an all-India agitation would be launched if the killers of Saraswati were not arrested. The Church and Christian groups in turn demanded dismissal of the state government.

On 15 September 2008, it was reported that there was an attack on two Hindu temples in Odisha's Sundergarh district. One was attacked on the night of 14 September, and the other 2 weeks earlier.

On 30 September 2008, a Christian nun accused the mob of raping her on 25 August at Nuagaon in Kandhamal district. During a press conference she said that a group of unidentified persons, dragged her along with Fr Thomas Chellan to the deserted Jana Vikas building. The priest was doused with petrol and beaten up. She reported that the mob paraded her on the streets in the presence of a dozen policemen Eventually, four men were arrested for the attack, and a senior police office suspended over the delayed investigation. After the complaint was launched, police had a medical examination of the nun carried out, which confirmed her rape. Police sent the clothes of the said nun to the state forensic laboratory for further verification. Police arrested nine people in connection with the crime while the nun in case was in hiding for fear of reprisals. The Crime branch took charge of the probe following a government decision after the medical report. On 22 October 2008, the Supreme Court of India, rejected an appeal by the Archbishop of Cuttack, Raphael Cheenath, for a Central Bureau of Investigation (CBI) probe into the incident and asked the victim to look at an identity parade of those accused to identify the culprit with the help of the state police itself. Reuters reported the nun's media conference under the headline '40 men gang-raped me, says nun'; though she had made no such statement.

== Relief camps ==
20,000 people were sheltered in 14 relief camps built by the state government from 23 August onwards. Approximately 50,000 people were hiding in the district's forest areas, and nearly 500 people went to Bhubaneswar and Cuttack to stay in relief camps made by the YMCA. Around 50,000 people reportedly escaped to surrounding districts and neighboring states.

The United States Commission on International Religious Freedom reported that by March 2009, and at least 3,000 individuals were still in government camps, reportedly because of their inability to return to their family homes unless they "reconvert" to Hinduism. After two weeks, a month long series of "reconversion" rituals and processions with the slain Swami's ashes were announced. There was no immediate police response. Many Christians allegedly took place in these ceremonies due to the fear of additional violence, property destruction and harassment.

== Total casualties and damages ==
Government reports suggested that the violence resulted in at least 39 killed, over 365 churches vandalized or destroyed, over 5,600 houses were looted or burnt down, 600 villages ransacked and more than 54,000 were left home less. While other reports put the death toll to nearly 100 and suggested more than 40 women were sexually assaulted and many Christians were forced to convert to Hinduism with the threat of violence.

The report by the Centre for Child Rights reported that at least 300 churches were destroyed; 13 Colleges, schools and 5 NGO offices were damaged. About 30,000 people lived in relief camps for months. About 2,000 people were forced to convert to Hinduism.

According to a research by the Kandhamal Committee for Peace and Justice, 395 churches and places of worship and more than 6,500 homes were ransacked and razed to the ground during the August 2008 attacks.

In its report, a CPI fact-finding team quoted officials admitting that in the month-long anti-Church riots in which VHP and Bajrang Dal played a central role, not less than 500 individuals were killed. The report said a senior government official on the requesting anonymity stated that he personally relegated 200 corpses found from the forest and from fires after getting them loaded in a tractor and reported that depending on the severity and pace of murders the number of those slain is over 500 people. The report also claimed that the incidents took place in front of the police and the police were mute spectators.

Initial reports suggested that more than 18,000 were injured and 50,000 displaced. Another report said that around 11,000 people were still living in relief camps, as of October 2008. Some tribals even fled away to border districts in neighbouring states. 310 villages were affected with 4,640 homes, 252 churches, and 13 educational institutes torched during attacks. Multiple Hindu temples and an unknown number of Hindus were also killed during the riots, excluding the five Hindu sadhus (including Saraswati) who were killed in the beginning itself.

On 14 October 2008, Cuttack Archbishop Raphael Cheenath moved the Supreme Court seeking ₹ 30 million as compensation to rebuild the demolished and vandalized churches in the riot-hit areas. He also sought ₹ 550,000 for the kin of those killed in the riots and compensation of ₹ 60,000 to those whose houses were damaged or torched.

== Investigations ==
A report by the National Commission for Minorities blamed the violence on Sangh Parivar outfits and the Bajrang Dal. The Director general of police of Gujarat, CP Singh, stated on record that "organisations like the VHP and Bajrang Dal are clearly behind the violence. The CPM member Basudeb Acharia blamed the Bajrang Dal of the attacks and said that within an hour after the swami's murder the Bajrang Dal and the VHP armed with swords and spears started to attack the Christians and burnt-down their houses. Orissa's Chief Minister Naveen Patnaik said that the Sangh Parivar was involved in the violence.

In a press release made on 21 September, The National Commission for Minorities blamed the Sangh Parivar and Bajrang Dal for the communal violence in states of Karnataka and Odisha. Shafi Qureshi, member of the NCM team stated that the NCM teams had determined activists of Bajrang Dal were involved in these attacks in both in state of Odisha and Karnataka. Condemning the attack on churches in Kandhamal and other areas of Odisha and in Dakshina Kannada, Udupi, Chikmagalur and Mangalore in Karnataka, the Commission stressed the need for immediate confidence building measures to allay the fear from the minds of the minorities in both states of Odisha and Karnataka.

The Sangh Parivar was also held responsible for the violence by the report of the fact-finding commission led by Justice AP Shah in 2010.

The historical context of the Kandhamal violence is the spread of the ideology of Hindutva... A planned attack on the Christian minority in Orissa was a tragedy in the waiting period following the Gujarat pogrom of 2002 that killed over 2,000 Muslims and destroyed the community. Kandhamal was an ideal place for such an attack because of the possibility to manipulate the strained dynamics of the relationship between both the Dalit and the Adivasi populations to satisfy the aims of religious extremists.

— Fact-finding tribunal by Justice AP Shah.

On 28 August, a letter of denial (denying responsibility for the murder of Saraswati) was received by some media houses suspected to be from a Maoist group. While the letter denied that the Central Committee of the Kotagarha branch of the Maoists had approved the attack, it claimed that some Maoists may have been lured by "nefarious elements" to launch the attack. But the local police force continued to maintain that Maoists were behind the operation Soon after the appearance of the aforementioned letter, "Azad", another leader of the splinter Maoist People's Liberation Guerrilla Army group, claimed responsibility for the murder of Lakshmanananda in another letter. Azad was suspected by the police of leading the attack himself. Finally, on 9 September 2008 the Maoists, who work underground, made an official press release claiming responsibility for the killing of Lakshmanananda. Many Maoist sympathizers of south Odisha had initially denied the role of CPI-Maoist in the murder of VHP leaders that sparked off communal violence in Kandhamnal district. Communist Party of India (Maoist) leader Sabyasachi Panda claimed that they killed Swami Laxmanananda Saraswati and four of his disciples at his Jalespeta ashram on 23 August, for his Anti-Maoist hate speech, in the state of Odisha and the tribal Kandhamal region in particular. Finally, on 7 October 2008, the Odisha police announced they arrested three Maoists in connection with the murder of the Swami.

On 16 October 2008, in an interview to PTI the IG police Arun Ray told that "Maoists trained certain youths of the tribal community to eliminate Saraswati", the "tribal community" believed by the Hindu Extremist to be a reference to the converted Christians of the region led to the "Fuel in the Fire" in the riots. The plan to eliminate Lakshmanananda was made in 2007, he added. Elaborating the probe by the crime branch, Ray said investigations also showed that a group had collected money from some villages in Kandhamal which was given to the Maoist group to train their youth for the purpose. The police said that they already arrested three persons, including two tribals and others who belong to the extremist Maoist groups and efforts were now on to arrest the other accused.

== Political and legal fallout ==
At the time of the Kandhamal riots in 2008, the ruling government of Odisha, headed by Chief Minister Naveen Patnaik, was a coalition of the BJP and the Biju Janata Dal (BJD). In the 147-member state assembly the BJD-BJP combine had 93 members, 32 of whom are from the BJP. Some BJP legislators blamed the government for not providing adequate protection to Saraswati, despite other attempts on his life. They called for withdrawing support from the government, which would lead to its collapse. In the runup to the 2009 elections, Patnaik broke his ties with the BJP, saying that the alliance in the state had to be broken because it became impossible for him to stay with the BJP after the Kandhanmal riots which "horrified the entire world". In November 2009, after winning the elections again, this time without the support of the BJP and therefore free from political compulsions, re-elected chief minister of Odisha Naveen Patnaik, claimed that the Vishva Hindu Parishad, the Bajrang Dal, and the Rashtriya Swayamsevak Sangh were involved in the violence.

On 4 September 2008, the Supreme Court of India issued an order on a petition filed by Catholic Archbishop Raphael Cheenath seeking a CBI enquiry and dismissal of the state government. The order refused to dismiss the Odisha state government but asked it to report on steps taken to stop the wave of communal rioting that had claimed at least 16 lives. In his petition, the Archbishop claimed that VHP leader Pravin Togadia carried out a procession with Saraswati's ashes after his cremation, an act that clearly inflamed further communal tension and rioting. The Supreme Court, in its order, asked the state government to file an affidavit explaining the circumstances under which this procession was allowed. However, it later emerged that Saraswati was never cremated in the first place (as a Hindu sannyasi, the holy man had already symbolically cast his physical body into fire while alive by wearing saffron robes, and set the soul free). As is the tradition of sannyasis, Saraswati was not cremated but instead buried and entombed after death. Since no cremation ever took place, Togadia replied that there was no question of "ashes" being proposed to be carried in any procession at all, and therefore the claims of "asthi kalash yatra" (carrying of the ashes) were untrue. He also alleged that Archbishop Raphael Cheenath had therefore "lied under oath to the apex court", because no such procession ever took place.

== Arrests and convictions ==
On 29 June 2010, a fast-track court set up after the Kandhamal riots found Manoj Pradhan, a Bharatiya Janata Party politician and a Member of the Legislative Assembly of Odisha, guilty of murder of Parikhita Digal, a Christian from Budedi village who was killed by the mob on 27 August 2008. Manoj Pradhan who was nominated by the BJP while imprisoned pending trial, was sentenced to seven years rigorous imprisonment. However, pending his appeal, he was granted bail by the High court on 6 July. A number of others have also been sentenced in riot-related cases. On 9 September 2010, another judge found Pradhan guilty in the murder of Bikram Nayak from Budedipada on 26 August 2008. In December 2010, 18 people were convicted.

The Hindutva groups blamed the local Christian tribals for the murder of Lakshmanananda even-though the killers were suspected of being Maoist insurgents by the government. Later a senior Maoist leader claimed responsibility for the murder, and the police also confirmed that the Maoists hadtrained tribal youth to carry out the murder. On 30 September 2013, Additional district judge Rajendra Kumar Tosh at an Additional district and sessions court in Phulbani convicted seven Christians for the murder: Gadanath Chalanseth, Bijaya Kumar Shyamseth, Buddha Nayak, Sanatan Badamajhi, Duryadhan Sunamajhi, Bhaskar Sunamajhi and Munda Badamajhi. However, on 1 October 2013, the same court also convicted a Maoist leader from Andhra Pradesh for the same crime.

Six days later the same court set free five non-Christians who were being tried for burning of a Christian house in the riots following the murder. Sajan George, president of Global Council of Indian Christians alleged that the court is biased against the Christian minority. The defence lawyer, S.K. Padhi said that the ruling would be appealed against in the Odisha High Court.

== Response ==
- India's Prime Minister Manmohan Singh called the Odisha violence a "shame" and offered all help from the centre to end the communal clashes and restore normalcy. He said he would speak to Odisha chief minister Naveen Patnaik to urge him to take all necessary steps to end the violence.
- Vatican City On Wednesday, 27 August 2008, Pope Benedict XVI condemned the violence and expressed solidarity with the priests, nuns, and laypeople being victimized.
- Human Rights Watch, a US-based outfit, expressed extreme dismay at the mob violence against Christians instigated by the VHP. The organization also expressed concern at the state government's lack of action following the Christmas 2007 violence.
- Italy's Foreign Ministry called on India's ambassador to demand 'incisive action' to prevent further attacks against Christians.
- The National Human Rights Commission of India (NHRC) sought a report from the Odisha government on the ongoing religious violence in the state.
- United States Commission on International Religious Freedom (USCIRF) demanded the Indian authorities take immediate steps to quell the violence and order a probe to find out the perpetrators of the attacks. "The continuing attacks targeting Christians represent the second major outbreak of religious violence in Orissa since December which underlines the pressing need for Indian government to develop preventive strategies", USCIRF said. "State governments must be held accountable for violence and other unlawful acts that occur in their state" Commission Chair Felice D Gaer said in a statement. USCIRF called on the US State Department to urge the central government and its Human Rights and Minority Commissions to continue their investigations, issue reports on the status of their investigations, and take further appropriate measures to address the situation, including ensuring that perpetrators of the violence are brought to account.
- European Union expressed concern over the violence against Christians in Odisha and hoped that the ruling government would bring the perpetrators to justice.

== Subsequent religious actions ==
The Catholic Church gave approval to begin the process of beatification of 35 Catholics killed in the riots as martyrs on October 18, 2023. As such, they are declared Servants of God.

== See also ==
- 1998 attacks on Christians in southeastern Gujarat
- Violence against Christians in India
- 2007 Christmas violence in Kandhamal
- 2008 Kandhamal nun gang rape case
