= Budhri Tati =

Indian social worker

- Born: 1966 (age 59–60); Hiranar, Dantewada district, Chhattisgarh, India
- Other name: Badi Didi
- Occupation: Social worker
- Awards: Padma Shri (2026)

Budhri Tati (also spelled Budhari Tati), known as Badi Didi ("elder sister"), is an Indian social worker from the Bastar region of Chhattisgarh. Since 1984 she has worked in tribal villages on literacy, education for girls and women's self-reliance. In 2026 she was awarded the Padma Shri in the field of social work.

== Early life ==
Tati was born in 1966 in Hiranar, a village in Dantewada district, into a poor family. At about the age of six she was sent to a tribal welfare ashram, where she studied up to Class 10. She belongs to the tribal community of the forest areas.

== Social work ==
Tati began social service work at the age of 15 and in January 1984 formally joined the Vanvasi Kalyan Ashram. From 1984 she worked in forest areas of Bastar on de-addiction programmes, literacy campaigns and the education of women and girls. She travelled between villages on foot.

Tati helped set up residential hostels for girls from remote forest settlements. A hostel opened at Barsur in 1990 with 11 girls, and a free hostel at Hauranar accommodates about 50 girls. She has also worked with women's groups that offer training in sewing, handloom weaving and local crafts. More than 500 women have become financially self-reliant through her work, and some of them work as nurses.

== Recognition ==
The Government of Chhattisgarh honoured Tati before 2026. In January 2026 the Government of India announced her as a Padma Shri recipient in the field of social work.
