= National Highway 753B (India) =

National highway in India

National Highway 753B
- Map of the National Highway in red

Route information
- Auxiliary route of NH 53
- Length: 178 km (111 mi)

Major junctions
- East end: Shevali
- West end: Netrang

Location
- Country: India
- States: Maharashtra, Gujarat

Highway system
- Roads in India; Expressways; National; State; Asian
← NH 53	→ NH 56

National Highway 753B (Also a rout of Ankleshwar-Burhanpur Highway), commonly referred to as NH 753B is a national highway in India. It is a spur road of National Highway 53. NH-753B traverses the states of Maharashtra and Gujarat in India.

== Route ==
Shevali, Nizampur, Chhadvel, Nandurbar, Taloda, Akkalkuwa, Khapar, Sagbara, Dediapada, Netrang.

== Junctions ==
NH 53 Terminal near Shevali.
NH 56 Terminal near Netrang.

== See also ==
- List of national highways in India
- List of national highways in India by state
