= 2007 Christmas violence in Kandhamal =

Anti-Christian violence in Orissa

- Date: 24–27 December 2007 (4 days)
- Location: Kandhamal District, Odisha
- Caused by: Hate speech, Religious nationalism, Ethnic nationalism, Ethnic tensions
- Methods: Arson, murder, looting

Casualties and Damages
- Deaths: estimates range between 3 and 50
- Damages: 100+ Churches burnt down, demolished or vandalized; 100+ Christian institutions burnt down or vandalized; 837+ families left homeless; 700-730 houses (120 belonging to Hindus) were burnt or damaged

The 2007 Christmas violence in Kandhamal violence refers to the violence committed against Indian Christians that occurred during the Christmas of 2007 between the groups led by RSS together with the Sangh-affiliated Kui Samaj.

The violence started on 24 December and ended on 27 December 2007. Violence first broke out on 24 December between Hindus and Christians over Christmas celebrations, where a mob of 500 to 3,000 members of various Sangh Parivar organizations desecrated several Christmas decorations and injured many Christians. On the same day an alleged attack on VHP leader Lakshmanananda Saraswati and his driver by some Christians after some of his bodyguards allegedly vandalized church equipment.

Clashes between the Kui Samaj which protested the tribal status to the Christians together with groups led by Vishva Hindu Parishad, Rashtriya Swayamswvak Sangh, Bajrang Dal and the Vanavasi Kalyan Ashram against the Christians erupted after these incidents, where more than 100 churches and church institutions, 700 houses were burnt down, vandalized or damaged. During the final day of the riots there was also a Christian retaliation in which mobs burnt down about 120 houses of Hindus at different places in the district. The official death toll suggested three Christians were killed but other reports put the death toll at nearly 50.

== Background ==
=== Kandha–Pana tensions ===
The Kandhamal district is home more than 100,000 Christians where 60% of them converted from the Scheduled Castes (SC) and are locally called as the Pana Christians. They were Dalits and they speak Kui language like tribal Kandhas. The district has been ethnically divided for decades between the tribal Kui-speaking Kandha tribals and lower caste Kui-speaking Christian Panas. The Kui Samaj, a Hindutva-affiliated tribal organization claimed to represent all the Kandha tribals who were nearly 52% of the population in the district. According to the Constitution, the reservation benefits are removed from the SCs after conversion but the Pana Christians demanded the Scheduled Tribe (ST) status after the Presidential Order of 2002 which mentioned the Kui tribes in the ST category since the Pana Christians also speak the kui language. This was opposed by the Vishva Hindu Parishad (VHP), the Kui Samaj and other political leaders who depend on Hindu tribals to support their vote bank in the area. These tensions soon transformed into communal.

The Communalism Combat blamed the Sangh Parivar for orchestrating rivalries between Kandhas and the Christian Panas in Kandhamal through Hinduization and polarizing the Kandhas ties with the panas and instigating the Kandhas against the latter's campaign for a scheduled status as a tribe.

=== Christmas tensions ===
During the last days of the 2007 Christmas, the Dalit Pana Christians were constructing a cloth-draped pandal⟨a temporary decorative scaffolding⟩ for the Christmas celebrations, over-topping a main-street in the town of Brahmanigaon after receiving permission for the construction from the authorities. The pandal which had been constructed on the same spot for number of years was warned to be removed this year by some local Hindus because it was located in the same area where a recent Durga Puja celebrations took place. The activists of the Sangh-affiliated Kui Samaj who had a strained relationship with the Pana Christians called for a Statewide bandh⟨shutdown⟩ on 24 and 25 December 2007 to protest against granting of the ST caste status to the SC Pana Christians with the support of the groups affiliated to the Rashtriya Swayamsevak Sangh. The call was first made by Laxmananda Saraswati's commemoration committee. Christians were also warned not to put-up Christmas decorations due to the fact that some Hindus also celebrated Christmas along with them. Due to these tensions several Christian groups asked for extra police protection for their Christmas celebrations.

Despite the Kui Samaj's call for the Statewide bandh, the police opened the local market on 24 December at about 7 a.m. in Brahmanigoan after recommendation by some Christian groups for their Christmas preparations. About two hours late a large group allegedly led by a local RSS leader, Bikram Rout, arrived in the market and attempted to forcefully shut it down but the police kept it open. Later scuffles started between the Hindu and the Christian merchants after the group led by the RSS leader allegedly roughed up with some Christians in the market and the market was eventually closed down.

=== Lakshmanananda Saraswati ===
On 24 December, at about 10:45 am, Lakshmanananda Saraswati, while travelling to the town of Brahmanigaon for a Yajna ritual in his car was forced to stop after a bus broke down in front of his vehicle. Hearing Christmas music coming from a nearby church, he sent his bodyguards to ask it to be turned down. His body guards allegedly roughed up on some Christians and vandalized the Church equipments. Saraswati claimed that a group of Christians injured him and his driver and damaged his car, while eye-witnesses and doctor's statements said that he did not appear seriously hurt. Yet, pictures of him, lying in a hospital bed were circulated widely in the internet and in the news reports. The RSS, Bajrang Dal, VHP and the Bharatiya Janata Party (BJP) called for a 4-hour bandh on the Christmas Day following the incident. This led to the communal tensions in the area.

=== Other incidents leading up to the riots ===
On 23 December, Hindutva-associated tribal organisations reportedly organized a rally with slogans of 'Stop Christianity, Kill Christians' with the support of Sangh Parivar groups. That same day, Hindutva activists organized a ritual to convert Pastor Digal from the Kutikia Gram panchayat along with 12 members of the Christian community. He was beaten, brutally tortured and paraded naked as he refused to renounce Christianity.

== Riots ==
Violent clashes occurred from 24 to 27 December 2007 between people led by the Sangh Parivar groups, the Sangh-affiliated Kui Samaj and the Christians.

Around 10 a.m. on 24 December, a mob of around 500 people led again by the RSS leader, Bikram Rout ransacked the pandal and set it on fire in front of the onlooking police. The mob then went on to destroy Christian shops and attack Christians. Gun-shots were fired, a boy was severely wounded, many Christians fled to the near-by jungles out of fear. While other reports suggest more than 3000 people belonging to Vishwa Hindu Parishad, RSS, Bajrang Dal and the Vanavasi Kalyan Ashram started to vandalize Christian symbols and two young boys suffered gun injuries. The Church of Our Lady of Lourdes was destroyed. This occurred before Laksmananda was attacked.

On 25 December, six churches were set ablaze after the Christians were chased out. The violence continued as the members of each community clashed with each other.

On 26 December, clashes continued all over the district, multiple houses were attacked and many were left injured, a police station in Phiringia was set on fire. Police was found it difficult to reach the violence hit areas in the villages as protesters obstructed roads by blocking it with trees. Chief Minister of Odisha Naveen Patnaik held two rounds of meetings with senior officials to review the situation.

On 27 December, dozens of churches were ransacked and razed in the areas of Nuagaon, G Udaygiri Phulbani Sadar and Brahmanigoan. A Congress parliamentarian's house was also attacked by the Saffron activists and the Kui tribals, opposing tribal status for the Pana Christians. A Christian reprisal also took place as a Christian mob entered the Hindu quarter of Brahmanigaon and set fire to about hundred homes. Similarly, a Christian mob set fire to an additional twenty homes near Gadapur. On the same day the rioting had stopped.

== Total casualties and damages ==
Initial governmental reports suggested that more than 100 churches and church institutions, including hostels, convents and about 700 houses and other structures were burnt in the riots and three persons killed (all Christians). More than 837 families were left homeless. A report by the National Commission for Minorities, suggested more than 730 houses were destroyed and 95 churches were burnt. The Communalism combat reported 85-95 churches and 94-96 Christian institutions were burnt down, vandalized or damaged; homes were also looted of jewellery and other valuables.

The All India Christian Council (AICC) study team stated that in December 2007, Hindu nationalists murdered a total of 50 Christians, destroyed 730 housing units and 95 churches. In the numerous relief camps set up by State government, hundreds of displaced Christians were made to stay.

The general secretary of the Kandhamal district's Christian Endeavour Union, suggested that 100 houses belonging to Christians were burnt in Godapur, Brahmanigoan, Barakhama, and some other villages on 26–27 December 2007. He also visited Godapur and Brahmanigaon villages to take a look of the situation, and suspected that these houses were burnt sown by sections of "Hinditva Activists" who may have been incited by the Maoists.

== Investigations ==
Many members of the Hindu community have claimed that Christian show of religiosity, and the financial privilege that enabled such an exhibition, contributed to the rioting. While some Hindu organisations suggested that disturbances were the result of ethnic tensions in the area, mainly between the Dalit Pana community and the Adivasi Kandhas.

Independent experts found that in terms of the violence and planning it across the mountainous areas, the violence was orchestrated and the police had prior information about the Hindutva organisations planning to riot. The celebration of Chief Minister of Odisha Naveen Patnaik's party's 10th anniversary coincided with the turmoil. The celebration demanded that a significant number of the state police forces be relocated from districts to Bhubaneswar, the state capital. The police found it challenging to react to the developing situation in Kandhamal between 24 and 25 December. Hindutva organizations claimed the violent uprising of Hindus stemmed from Christian conversions and the actions of Maoist organizations, resulting in the 2007 Kandhamal riots.

== See also ==
- 2008 Kandhamal nun gang rape case

== Bibliography ==
- Robinson, Rowena (2010). Margins of faith : Dalit and tribal Christianity in India. Joseph Marianus Kujur. New Delhi, India: Sage Publications. ISBN 978-81-321-0604-3. OCLC 671529854.
- Justice, Peace and Development Commission (JPDC) (Bhubaneswar, India) (2008). Faith under fire. Delhi: Media House. ISBN 978-81-7495-320-9. OCLC 294883231.
- Bauman, Chad M. (2015). Pentecostals, proselytization, and anti-Christian violence in contemporary India. New York, NY: Oxford University Press, 2015. ISBN 978-0-19-020210-1. OCLC 888554934.
