= National Highway 56 (India) =

National highway in India

National Highway 56
- Map of National Highway 56 in red

Route information
- Length: 703 km (437 mi)

Major junctions
- North end: NH 27 in Chittorgarh, Rajasthan
- List: NH 156 in Nimbahera, Rajasthan; NH 927A in Banswara, Rajasthan; NH 147D in Limdi, Gujarat; NH 47 in Dahod, Gujarat; NH 756 in Bodeli, Gujarat; NH 753B in Netrang, Gujarat; NH 53 in Vyara, Gujarat; NH 360 in Vansda, Gujarat; NH 848 in Chiol, Gujarat
- South end: NH 48 in Vapi, Gujarat

Location
- Country: India

Highway system
- Roads in India; Expressways; National; State; Asian
← NH 55	→ NH 57

National Highway 56, commonly referred to as NH 56, is a highway connecting the city of Nimbahera in Rajasthan to Vapi in Gujarat. The highway passes through the states of Rajasthan, Madhya Pradesh & Gujarat.

== Route ==
The Highway traverses 703 kilometres (437 mi) starting from NH156 at Nimbahera & passing through Pratapgarh, Banswara, Limdi, Dahod, Alirajpur, Chhota Udepur, Bodeli, Ektanagar(Kevadiya), Rajpipla, Mandvi, Dharampur ending on NH48 at Vapi. The highway is mostly 4 laned in the state of Gujarat & Madhya Pradesh but just 2 laned in Rajasthan. It is one of the worst highways of India in terms of dacoity & vehicle hijacking.
