= Kalamsar Mohida =

Village in Maharashtra

Kalamsar Mohida K.Mohida
- village
- Location in Maharashtra, India Kalamsar Mohida (India)
- Coordinates: 21°57′30″N 74°14′27″E
- Country: India
- State: Maharashtra
- District: Nandurbar

Languages
  - Official: Marathi
- Time zone: UTC+5:30 (IST)
- PIN: 425 413
- Vehicle registration: MH-39
- Coastline: 0 kilometres (0 mi)
- Nearest city: Taloda, Maharashtra
- Literacy: 60%
- Climate: 35-40 (Köppen)
- Avg. summer temperature: 40 °C (104 °F)
- Avg. winter temperature: 10 °C (50 °F)

Kalamsar Mohida, Taloda tehsil, Nandurbar district, is a village in the Indian state of Maharashtra. It is located approximately 7 kilometers from Taloda.

The primary occupation of residents is farming. The population numbers approximately 3000. Major crop products include sugar cane, bananas, papaya, cotton, and turmeric.

No proper road or public transit reaches the village. In the rainy season, water flow makes it impossible to pass through to the village. The nearest hospitals are in Taloda and Shahada, Maharashtra Shahada.

A government school teaches first to fourth standard.

High schools are available in Taloda, including Sheth K D High School and New High School.

The nearest technical college is Engineering College of Shahada, 25 kilometers away.

Mohida is situated between Taloda and Borad. It is 1.5 kilometers from Umri village.
