= Talode =

Talode Taloda
- city
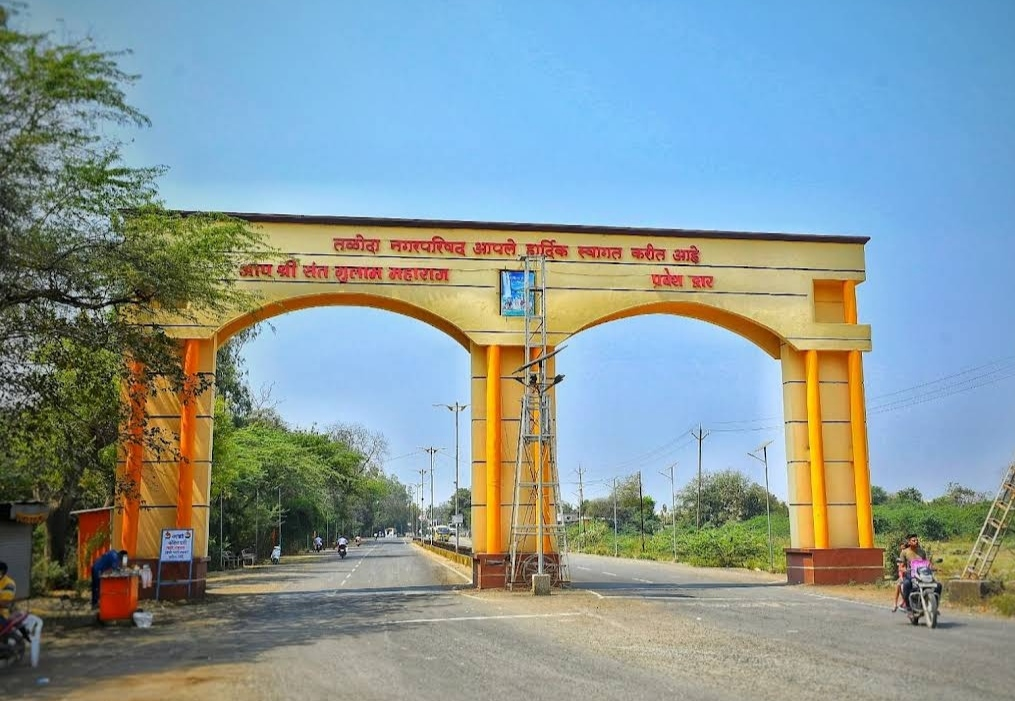
- Taloda Entrance Gate

- Location in Maharashtra, India
- Coordinates: 21.560670°N 74.22°E
- Country: India
- State: Maharashtra
- District: Nandurbar

Government
  - Type: Municipal Council
- Elevation: 366 m (1,201 ft)

Population (2023)
  - Total: 36,000
  - Density: 351/km^{2} (910/sq mi)
- Demonym: Talodekar

Languages
  - Official: Marathi
- Time zone: UTC+5:30 (IST)
- PIN: 425413
- Vehicle registration: MH 39

Taloda is a historical city and a municipal council in Nandurbar district located in the Khandesh region of Indian state of Maharashtra. The city is surrounded by beautiful river and mountains.

== Brief history ==
Taloda was originally ruled by Rajput chieftains, till 1631, after that, the Bargal Royal family of the khutekar dhangar caste established the rule there. Taloda (Talode) is a Tehsil with mountain range of Satpuda on its north side and river Tapti on the Southern Side. King Shivaji sacked city of Surat, on their journey, his forces used to halt (tal in Marathi) on the banks of Tapi river. It has given a unique identity to this area and the name to the town - as a place for halt.

The oldest monument of that period is the castle known as 'Garhi'. The construction of this castle, on a land of around 6 acres. Approx 700 years old.

Until 1947, it was a non salute state, and later it merged into India.

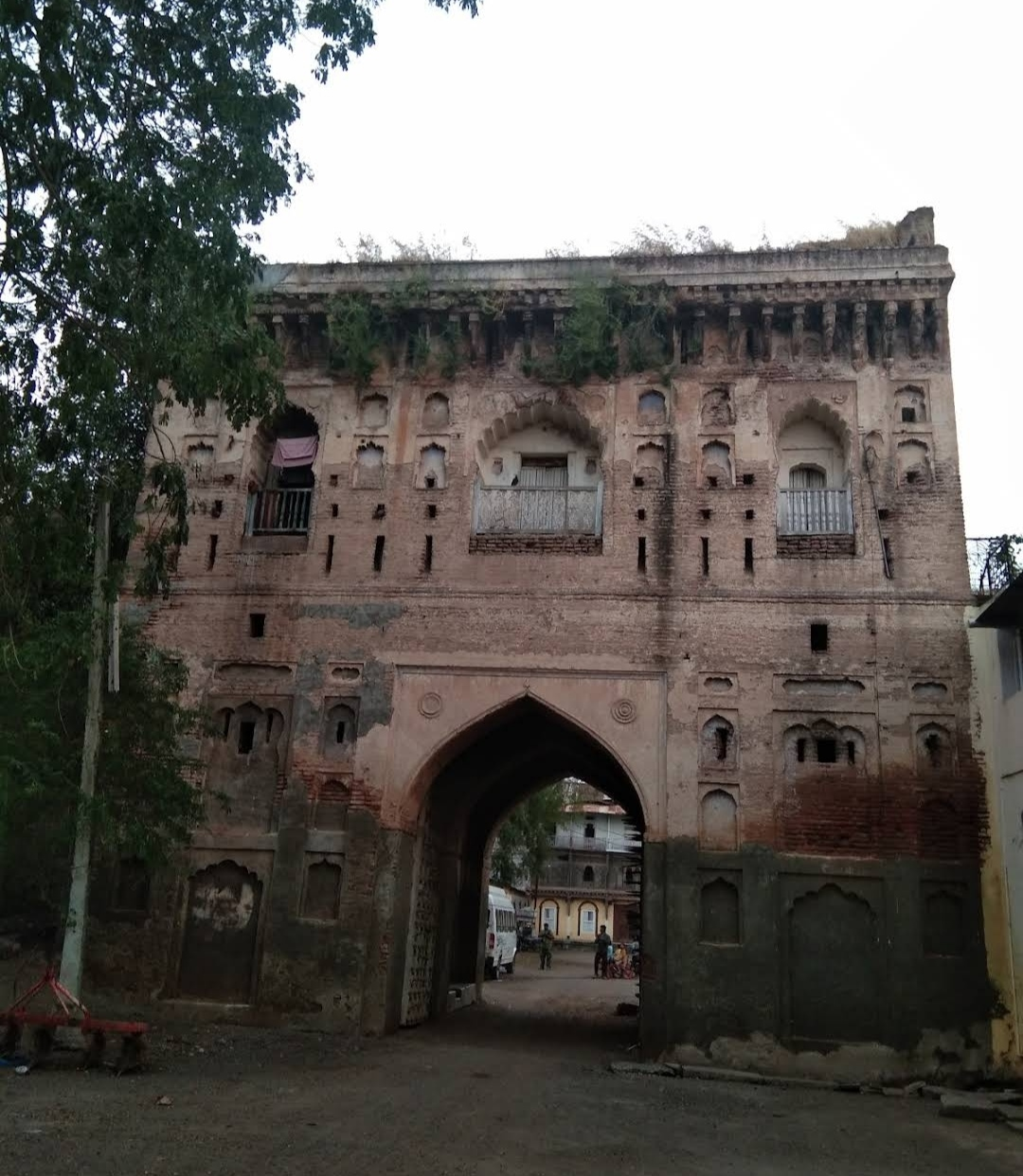
Bargalanchi Gadhi

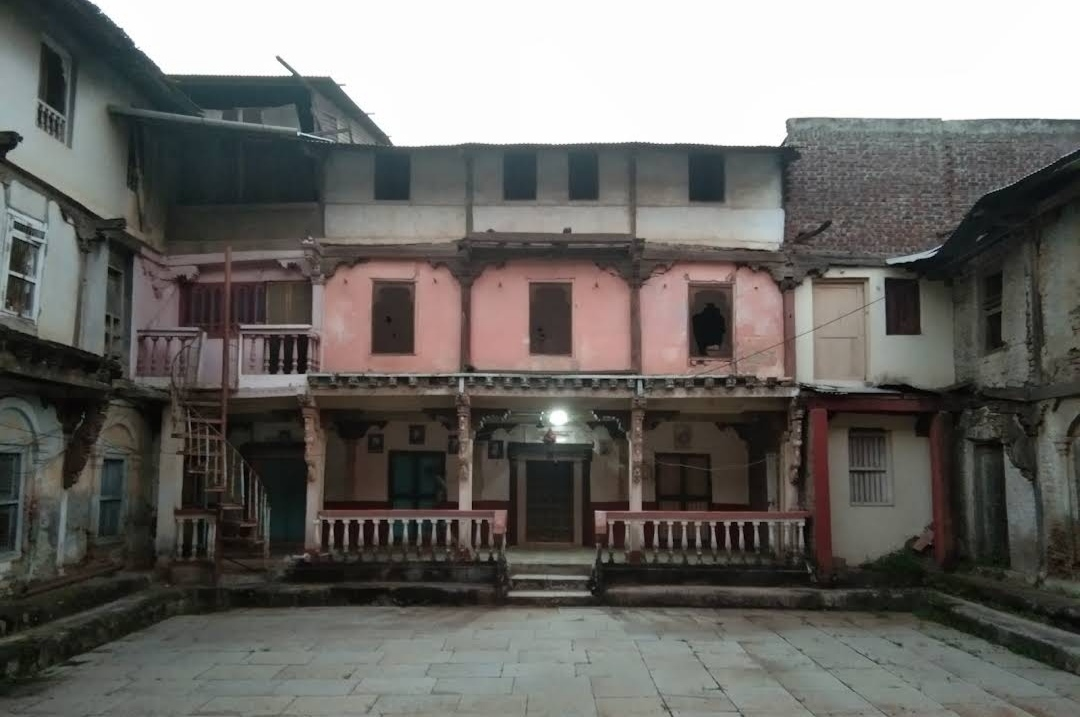
Gadhi Interior

Maharaj shreemantMalhar Rao Holkar, the son in law of Bhojraj Bargal spent a major part of his childhood here. Construction of many temples can be found in the vicinity. Bhojraj Bargal's descendants continued to live in the fortress of Taloda, descendants are not much interested to stay here as major fortress is in bad state.

Taloda also witnesses the Ashwatthama Yatra every year, where people from different sects (women not allowed due to religious beliefs) hike across the Satpuda Mountains to visit Ashwatthama's resting abode since it is a popular belief that he is still alive and will be so till the end of time.

== Geography ==
Taloda is located near Tapi river which is also known as Tapti river in south India. In the north of Taloda, the Satpuda mountain range is situated. City has an average elevation of 366 metres (1200 feet).

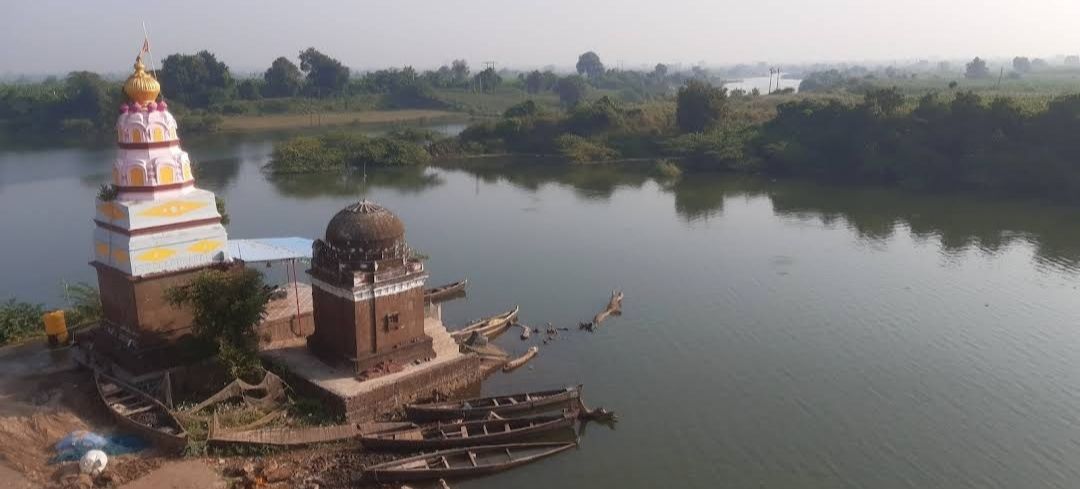
Tapi River

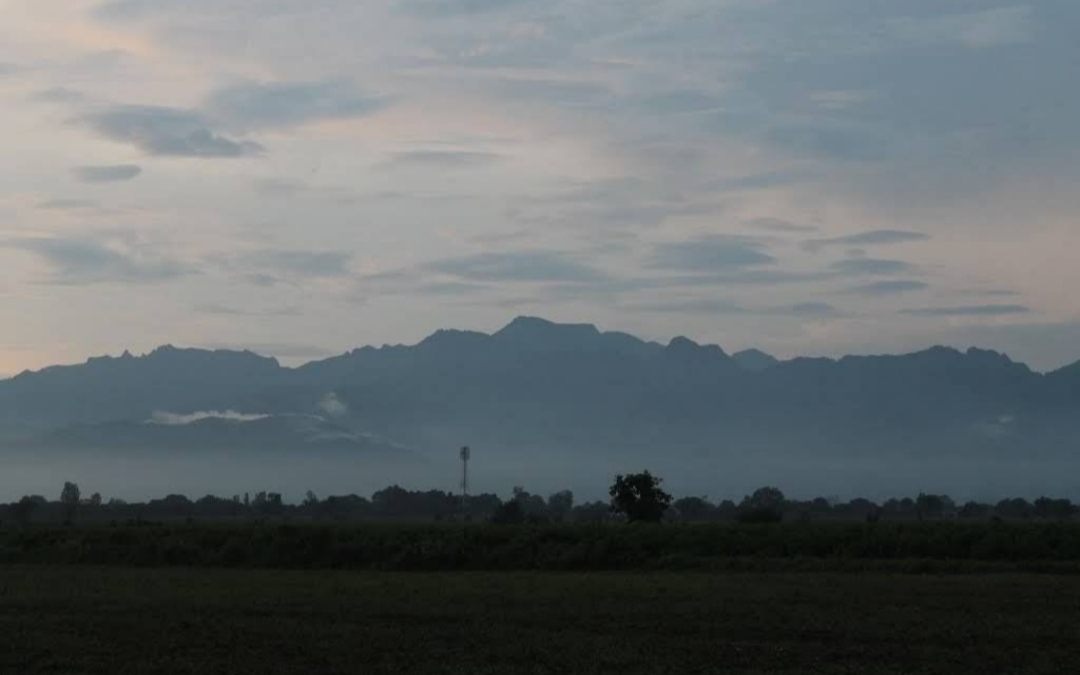
Satpuda Mountains

== Demographics ==
As of 2001 India census, Taloda had a population of 25,036. Males constitute 51% of the population and females 49%. Taloda has an average literacy rate of 60%, higher than the national average of 59.5%: male literacy is 68%, and female literacy is 52%. In Taloda, 13% of the population is under 6 years of age. First municipal corporation of maharastra is in taloda city 1867. Local tribal language bhilu ( ladshi dogari, bayadi etc... ) is most spoken language here and people spoke also Ahirani (a variety of Marathi) and Gujarati.

Year	Male	Female	Total Population	Change	Religion (%)							
Year	Male	Female	Total Population	Change	Hindu	Muslim	Christian	Sikhs	Buddhist	Jain	Other religions	Religion not stated
2001	12780	12256	25036	-	84.466	13.329	0.304	0.004	0.387	1.454	0.000	0.056
2011	13303	13060	26363	0.053	82.805	15.006	0.300	0.008	0.338	1.331	0.030	0.182

== Villages ==
- Kalamsar Mohida

== Transport ==
As National Highway 753B ( NH 753B ) passes through Taloda, it is well connected with state transport buses & private buses. Nearest railway station from Taloda is Nandurbar railway station which is situated just 17.7 km away. While Surat Airport which is located 193.2 km away from the city is the closest airport.
