= Religious violence in Odisha =

Civil unrest and riots in Odisha

Indian state of Odisha

Religious violence in Odisha consists of civil unrest and riots in the Indian state of Odisha in 1990s and early 2000s. Violence also took place against Christians by Hindu nationalists.

The Kandhamal district contains several tribal reservations where only tribal people can own land. The largest community in Kandhamal is the Kandha tribe. Most Kandha tribal people follow tribal and animistic forms of Hinduism.

== Background ==
=== Historical background of conversions ===
Franciscan missionary Friar Odoric visited India in the 14th century and wrote about his visit to Puri in a journal which he later published in Europe. In the journal, Odoric wrote in detail about a huge chariot containing idols of Hindu deities from the grand and famous Jagannath temple which is taken out annually in a procession known as the rath yatra. Odoric's account of the ceremony spread throughout Europe and by the 19th century the word juggernaut began to be associated with an unstoppable force of such proportions that is capable of destroying everything in its path. Subsequently, Baptist missionaries came to Odisha in 1822 during the British Empire's colonial rule over India.

=== After India's independence ===
The communal disharmony arose even before Indian independence in 1947 on aforementioned issue of religious conversion. Conversions have been legislated by the provisions of the Freedom of Religion Acts. Odisha was the first province of independent India to enact legislation in regards to religious conversions. The Orissa Freedom of Religion Act, 1967, mentions that no person shall "convert or attempt to convert, either directly or otherwise, any person from one religious faith to another by the use of force or by inducement or by any fraudulent means". Christian missions have been active in Odisha among the tribals from the early years of the twentieth century. Hindus and NGOs have alleged that the increase in the number of Christians in Odisha has been a result of an exploitation of illiteracy and impoverishment of the tribals by the missionaries in contravention of the law, instead of free will. Some also said the use of black magic and witchcraft to trap the poor tribals. Many of these Christian missionaries received the support of Maoist and Naxalist terrorists which angered the locals a lot.

Major issues in Kandhamal were the Maoists and Naxal terrorists exploiting the tribals and Scheduled caste that have led to tensions are claims that "The Scheduled Caste and the Scheduled Tribes (Prevention of Atrocities) Act" is violated. Such claims include the forcible occupation of tribal land, fake issuance of tribal and exploiting tribals for insurgent activities to create a communist state . This previously resulted in civil unrest and communal tensions in 1986, 1994 and 2001.

=== Conversion controversy ===
Behind the clashes are long-simmering tensions between equally impoverished groups: the Kandha tribe, who are 80% of the population, and the Pana (ପାଣ). Both are original inhabitants of the land.

Hindu groups have blamed the violence on the issue of religious conversion. Conversions have been legislated by the provisions of the Freedom of Religion Acts, replicated in some of the states in India. Odisha was the first state of independent India to enact legislation on religious conversions. The Orissa Freedom of Religion Act, 1967, stipulates that 'no person shall "convert or attempt to convert, either directly or otherwise, any person from one religious faith to another by the use of force or by inducement or by any fraudulent means"'. Hindus claim the Christian missionaries were converting poor tribal people by feeding them beef, which is shirk in Hinduism.

Hindus have further alleged that the increase in the number of Christians in Odisha has been a result of exploitation of illiteracy and impoverishment and use of black magic by the missionaries and use of force by Naxalists. The Census of India shows that Christian population in Kandhamal grew from around 43,000 in 1981 to 117,950 in 2001.

== 2007 Christmas violence in Kandhamal ==
During the Christmas of 2007, Hindu organizations such as the Vishva Hindu Parishad and the Rashtriya Swayamsevak Sangh committed violence against the local Christians in Kandhamal.

By 30 December, rioting was brought under control by the security forces such as the CRPF. The total number of security personnel deployed was about 2,500 police and paramilitary. The total number of people taking shelter in relief camps increased to 1200.

== 2008 Kandhamal violence ==
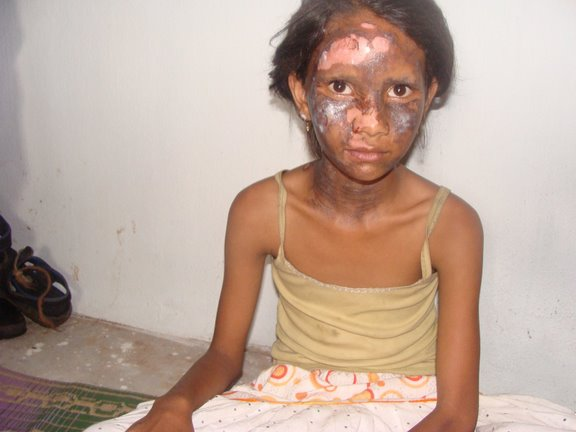
A girl who was bruised and burnt during violence in Orissa in August 2008. It occurred when a bomb was thrown into her house by Hindu extremists.

The 2008 Kandhamal violence was a massacre of Christians in Kandhamal, Odisha by Hindu nationalists. The violence resulted in many Christians killed and raped.

== 2025 Cuttack violence ==
Violence was reported in Cuttack, Odisha, on 4–5 October 2025 during Durga Puja idol-immersion processions. According to local media, clashes began near Dargah Bazar and Haathi Pokhari after some residents objected to loud music played by a procession organised by the Jhanjirimangala Bhagabat Puja Committee.

Police reported that stones and glass bottles were thrown, injuring several people including Deputy Commissioner of Police Rishikesh Khilari Dnyandeo, and that vehicles and shops were damaged.

Fresh incidents were reported the following day during a motorcycle rally linked to a bandh call by the Vishva Hindu Parishad, when stone-pelting and arson were reported in several areas, leaving civilians and police injured.

Authorities imposed curfew orders under Section 144 of the Criminal Procedure Code and suspended internet services for 24 hours to curb the spread of rumours.

Chief Minister Mohan Charan Majhi and opposition leaders appealed for peace and condemned the violence, which left dozens injured and led to multiple arrests before calm was restored by 7 October.
