= National Highway 756 (India) =

National Highway in India

National Highway 756
- Map of National Highway 756 in red

Route information
- Auxiliary route of NH 56
- Length: 48.4 km (30.1 mi)

Major junctions
- South end: Bodeli
- North end: Halol

Location
- Country: India
- States: Gujarat

Highway system
- Roads in India; Expressways; National; State; Asian
← NH 56	→ NH 756

National Highway 756, commonly referred to as NH 756, is a national highway in India. It is a secondary route of National Highway 56. NH-756 runs in the state of Gujarat in India.

== Route ==
NH756 connects Bodeli, Jambugodha, Pavagarh and Halol in the state of Gujarat.

== Junctions ==
NH 56 Terminal near Bodeli.

== See also ==
- List of national highways in India
- List of national highways in India by state
