= Persecution Relief =

Indian Nonprofit organization

- Formation: 2016
- Founder: Shibu Thomas
- Type: Non-Profit
- Website: persecutionrelief.org

Persecution Relief is an Indian Nonprofit organization founded in 2016 by Shibu Thomas. It is an inter-denominational organization dedicated to helping the Church in India. The organization monitors violence against Christians in India.

Religious persecution cases reported worldwide by the organization.

== History ==
Persecution Relief was founded in 2016 with a mission to provide support to the persecuted Indian Church by linking it to the free Church of the world. The initiative was taken by Shibu Thomas, an Indian evangelical preacher and social entrepreneur.

Persecution Relief provides support Prayerfully, Financially, Politically and Judicially to Christian Community and persecuted church.

The organization tracks anti-Christian persecution and harassment in India.

== Philanthropy ==
=== False Conversion Charges ===
During COVID-19 pandemic, the organization request to Indian Prime Minister Sri Narendra Modi to release prisoners who are in different jails in India and imprisoned under the false cases of conversion under the Religious Freedom Act. The organization also brings this matter to the prime minister's attention, a call from the United States Commission on International Religious Freedom to release all prisoners.

- The organization has helped many people who have been persecuted because of their faith.
- The organization records all the Persecution cases which they receive on there Toll Free No.
