= Brahmanigoan =

- Village
- Location in Odisha, India
- Coordinates: 19.67°N 84.08°E
- Country: India
- State: Odisha

Languages
  - Official: Odia
- Time zone: UTC+5:30 (IST)

Brahmanigan is a village in the Indian state of Odisha. It is located at 19°40'0N 84°5'0E with an average elevation of 603 metres (1981 feet).
