= Nuagaon =

Coordinates: 21.111876°N 84.720479°E

Nuagaon is a block in the Nayagarh district of Odisha, India. It contains 22 gram panchayats, which in turn include 100 villages.

== Location and geography ==
Nuagaon has an average elevation of 243 metres (797 ft) above sea level.
