= 2008 Kandhamal nun gang rape case =

Rape of a nun in Odisha

The 2008 Kandhamal nun gang rape case refers to the gang-rape of a 28-year-old nun during the 2008 Kandhamal violence. The incident received media attention during the riots.

The violence broke out between Hindu nationalists and Christians after the murder of a VHP leader. During the violence in Kandhamal district, a Catholic nun who worked with the tribals was taken away, along with a priest from the house where she took shelter, by a mob shouting "Bharat Mata ki Jai". The mob took her to another place where she was raped till another mob came and paraded her half-naked through the roads, beat her, and attempted to strip her completely naked along the way to a market place, where onlooking police did not intervene. The priest was doused with kerosene and an attempt made to burn him alive. Later the nun and priest were taken into police custody.

The nun blamed the police for allegedly being friendly with the attackers and discouraging her from filing a police complaint.

Later three suspects were convicted for the rape, and six others acquitted for lack of evidence.

== Background ==
The incident happened during anti-Christian violence that targeted Christian churches, institutions, and homes. More than 395 churches and 5600 Christians' houses were burned, 39-100 Christians killed, and nearly 60,000 left homeless by groups led by the Hindu nationalist Sangh Parivar groups.

The nun belonged to the Servite Order of the Catholic Church and was born in Sambalpur, Odisha, India. She was 28 years old during the time of the incident and worked with the tribals at the Divya jyoti Pastoral Centre in K Nuagaon, 12 km from Baliguda town in Kandhamal District.

The nun was very active in spreading information about various central government employment schemes like the National Rural Employment Guarantee Act, 2005 (NREGS) to the tribals. She was also helping the tribals with various micro-finance schemes. The non-tribal community were reportedly angry after their business took a hit from the nun's work. During 2007 and early 2008, the social service organization, Jan Vikas, where she worked was targeted several times. She asked for police protection, the day before the incident but the police did not respond.

== Incident ==
During the evening of 24 August 2008, a large mob arrived in front of the Divya jyoti centre where the nun was staying and she ran out through the back door, along with a few others, into the forest and sheltered at the house of a Hindu man for the night. The mob later set the Divya jyoti centre on fire.

The rape incident happened around 1 p.m on 25 August. A mob of 2000 assembled near the house shouting "Bharat Mata ki jai", and about 40-50 men armed with iron rods, lathis, sickles, axes, spades and crowbars entered the house where she was staying. They slapped her and pulled her out of the house by her hair. The nun also claimed two men attempted to decapitate her with an axe. Another priest who also took shelter in the house where she stayed was also taken out and beaten. The priest alleged that the men shouted pro-Hindutva slogans and wore saffron bandanas. The mob took her to a burnt down building, tore off her upper clothing, and she was gang-raped with two of the attackers standing on her hands. She lost consciousness and couldn't recall incidents after the assault. The priest was also beaten up and doused with kersone by the mob who threatened to set him on fire, as he protested. Another mob came there during the same time shouting "where is the nun" and "at-least hundred people should rape her". The nun claimed that the mob then took her and the priest outside and were searching for a rope to tie them up and burn them alive.

The police failed to stop the misdemeanours and failed to defend me from the assailants, they were friendly with the assailants, they tried their best to make sure that I did not register an FIR and to not make complaints against the police, they didn't take down my testimony as I recounted the incident in detail and deserted me half-way.
I was raped and now I don't want to be victimised by the police of Orissa. I want an investigation from the CBI.
God bless India, God bless you all.

— Sister Meena

The mob then paraded the nun half-naked without her upper clothing for more than a half-kilometer to a marketplace where people made lewd remarks such as "Hi beautiful" and commented on the size of her breasts. The mob kept beating her and attempted to strip her completely naked along the way. The nun claimed that when she asked for help from some policemen and sat beside them, they did not even flinch. As she was laying there in her blood, some people were collecting tyres to burn her and the priest alive. The mob then took them to a police outpost along with a policeman. The nun claimed that the mob said they would return after taking a food break, and that the police were very friendly with a man who attacked her, and discouraged her from filing a first information report (FIR). The report by the Indian People's Tribunal confirmed all the incidents.

The nun and priest were then taken to a hospital for medical check ups, and in several instances, the police kept them inside the jeep or in the garages fearing attacks on the police station by mobs, and then took them to a Central Reserve Police Force (CRPF) camp.

On the evening of the same day, the doctor who did medical tests on the nun confirmed that she had been raped.

== Convictions ==
On 3 October 2008, the Police Chief of Khandamal district, confirmed the rape and arrested 4 people in connection with the incident. On 25 October 2008, the nun was asked by the police to help identify the rapists. 27 people were arrested in connection with the incident by 2012.

On 14 March 2014, 3 people were convicted for the rape, and 6 people were acquitted due to lack of evidence. The key accused was given a jail time of 11 years, but was granted bail in 2016.

== Aftermath ==
Her public appeal mounted pressure on the ruling party to ban Bajrang Dal, a Sangh Parivar group which was the most accused of orchestrating the Kandhamal riots. However the ruling party reportedly feared as such a move would mobilize the vote-banks towards the Bhartiya Janata Party.

== See also ==
- Jhabua nuns rape case
