= Jhabua nuns rape case =

Nuns rape case in India

The Jhabua nuns rape case refers to the Gang rape of four Nuns in the Jhabua district, Madhya Pradesh in India on September 23, 1998, by tribal men. Around 18-26 men barged their way into the Ashram where the nuns lived and ransacked the entire ashram and some of the men gang raped the nuns.

== Incident ==
The nuns came from Tamil Nadu to the Nawapura village in the predominantly tribal Jhabua district on October 11, 1997 to set up a Medical Clinic at the Preetisharan Ashram. Three of them were aged between 25-30 and the fourth one was aged over thirty. They soon made the village their home. The four nuns lived alone in the ashram which was looked after by two watchmen. The in-charge of the ashram was a priest, who is also their nearest neighbor, lived 500 meters away. The area also lacked street lights and its becomes entirely dark after evening.

At night, about 2 a.m on 23 September, a group of men came to the ashram and requested the nuns to come with them claiming that some children at a nearby village were ill. The nuns told them to call the watchmen, who were supposed to guard the ashram were asleep at the residence of the priest in-charge as the priest went to the Dahod for some work. The men started to force their way in by trying to break through the fold-able metal grill outside the main door. Realizing their intentions, the nuns blew whistles to get the attention of the watchmen who were asleep half a kilometre away. The men managed to break through the metal grill, the main door and into one of the rooms the nuns locked themselves in. The men vandalized and ransacked the entire premises, gold and silver ornaments including approximately 20,000 rupees cash was reportedly stolen.

When the attackers started to leave, some men stayed behind and told the others that they would join them later and then dragged the nuns outside the ashram and took turns to rape them. According to the police, the fourth nun was not raped because she appeared older and got beaten up for trying to stop the rape. While the nuns stated that all four of them were raped.

== Aftermath ==
The Chief Minister of Madhya Pradesh, Digvijaya Singh visited the village and hinted that the attack was a plot by Hindutva groups against the Christians. He also related the incident with the chasing away of the Muslims in Godhra, Gujarat by the militant organization Vishva Hindu Parishad. A Jhabua court issued a warrant against Digvijay Singh then state chief minister and 14 others for alleged remarks on the Jhabua nuns rape case accusing Hindutva organisations of being involved in the incident, following a civil defamation suit filed by a local lawyer. A Bhopal court cancelled the warrant after Digvijay appeared and furnished a surety bond for Rs. 5,000.

Bharatiya Janata Party (BJP) leader Uma Bharti claimed that 12 of those who raped the Christian nuns were themselves tribal Christians, later L. K. Advani made the same statement in the Parliament. However, five days after the incident, the local Superintendent of police(SP) arrested 15 men and the nuns identified all of them. The SP reported that none of the arrested tribals were Christian. It is also reported that only 6 families in the two villages are Christians.

== Investigations ==
The most widely spoken theory among the tribals is that a tribal man named Samna had problem with the nuns, paid two local gangs for the assault on the mission. Locals claimed that the man had fallen in love with one of the nuns and was upset when she repulsed him.

The crime reportedly obtained communal and political color after the former BJP Member of parliament and VHP leader, Baikunt Lal Sharma justified the gang-rape as the result of "the anger of patriotic, angry Hindus".

A fact-finding team of the National Commission for Women (NCW) visited the district and said that the episode is not just a case of rape, robbery and molestation, but points to a larger conspiracy. The NCW pointed out that the tribals were never known to rape women. They came across a report of a man owing the nuns some money and getting angry when asked to pay. The NCW also reported that the villagers depended on the nuns for informal education and medical help because of the lack of government services in the area.

INC MP, KantiLal Bhuriya accused the BJP for aiding communal elements infiltrating Jhabua from Gujarat and Maharashtra.

The President of the Madhya Pradesh Christians Association, Indra Iyengar said that another catholic mission was attacked by vandals just miles away from the Nawapura village and Bajrang Dal members attacked another mission and uprooted its fence. She also said that "3 attacks within a span of 5 days shows that someone has a hidden agenda."

== Convictions ==
In April 2001, Seventeen men were convicted of the crimes and sentenced to life imprisonment by the district and sessions court. The men sentenced were Daru Mansingh,Khemraj,Pidiya,Pappu,Kenu,Chatra,Badra, Ruma, Kesaria, Kamji, Bhurji, Daru Dhanna, Ramesh, Chamna and Bhitra.

In April 2017, the police re-arrested Pidia Singaria, after he escaped his parole in 2006 and escaped from police ever since.

In March 2019, an escaped accused Kalu Limji was arrested by the police after 21 years. The Police reported that, of the 26 accused, 24 were arrested immediately after the incident and 13 were acquitted, while 9 were sentenced to life imprisonment by a local court.

== Reactions ==
The Vishva Hindu Parishad accused the nuns of Conversion and the organisation's secretary B. L. Sharma claimed that the incident reflected the "anger of patriotic Hindu youth against the anti‑national forces".

The spokesperson for the Bhartiya Janata Party and the editor of BJP Today, Kanchan Gupta said, "It's only a rape."

Head of the organization Bajrang Dal, deputy head of the VHP and a former BJP MP, Baikunt Lal Sharma said that the nuns "were asking for it."

Rajya Sabha MP Mabel Rebello said it is not a minority issue and only a women's issue.
