= United Christian Forum for Human Rights =

Organization

- Type: NGO
- Location: New Delhi, India

The United Christian Forum for Human Rights (UCFHR) is a coalition of Christian organizations in India that was formed in 2014 with the aim of advocating for the rights of Christians and other religious minorities in the country.

The UCFHR plays an important role in advocating for the rights of Christians and other religious minorities in India. The organization has worked to improve access to justice, provide legal support, and raise awareness about the situation of religious minorities in the country.

== Objectives ==
The main objectives of the UCFHR include:

- Advocating for the rights of religious minorities: The UCFHR aims to promote and defend the rights of Christians and other religious minorities in India. This includes speaking out against incidents of violence, discrimination, and persecution, and working to raise awareness about these issues.
- Providing legal support: The UCFHR provides legal support to victims of religious discrimination and persecution, including by filing cases in court on their behalf. The organization works to improve access to justice for religious minorities by providing legal aid clinics and other support services.
- Building alliances: The UCFHR works to build alliances with other civil society organizations, human rights groups, and government agencies to promote the rights of religious minorities. The organization engages with international organizations and governments to raise awareness about the situation of Christians in India.
- Monitoring and reporting: The UCFHR monitors and reports on incidents of religious discrimination and persecution against Christians in India. The organization produces reports documenting incidents of violence, harassment, and discrimination, which are used to raise awareness about the issue both nationally and internationally.

== Leaders ==
=== Alan Basil de Lastic ===
Alan Basil de Lastic, formerly Archbishop of Delhi, was instrumental in bringing members of most Christian denominations into the organization, and served as President. de Lastic announced a National Protest Day on 4 December 1998 to draw attention to the continued attacks on the Christian community. In September 1999 Archbishop Alan de Lastic and UCFHR National Convenor John Dayal protested to Prime Minister Atal Bihari Vajpayee over an ongoing terror campaign against the Orissa Christian community after Roman Catholic Priest Arul Doss had been brutally killed.

=== John Dayal ===
John Dayal also played a key role in formation of the UCFHR and was National Convenor. In September 1999 Human Rights Watch quoted Dayal as saying of the attacks "Dalits and tribals are used as instruments. They are paid, drugged, alcoholized, they are in a stupor". In September 2000 U.S. President Bill Clinton welcomed Indian Prime Minister Atal Bihari Vajpayee to the White House. In New York John Dayal and Bernard Chand, president of the International Council of Evangelical Churches, held a briefing hosted by Human Rights Watch on religious persecution of India’s Christian minority.

== Activities ==
In June 2000 the New Delhi-based UCFHR said it had identified 129 attacks in the past year against Christian churches, schools and individuals. Officials of the Indian government denied any involvement in the attacks. After a renewed surge of violence against Muslims and Christians in June 2005 John Dayal asked that a proposed constitutional review should consider the increased violence against minorities who are living in "an atmosphere of hatred". In 2009 the Gujarat United Christian Forum for Human Rights challenged the state's Freedom of Religion Act 2003 on the basis that it violated the constitutional right of individuals to choose their religion. The act had required a person who had decided to convert to a different religion to seek prior permission from a district magistrate.

The Karnataka United Christian Forum for Human Rights (KUCFHR) was formed in September 2008 after attacks were launched on Christian Churches across Karnataka. In December 2009 priests and pastors from several Christian denominations participated at an ecumenical meeting organized by KUCFHR at St. Mark's Cathedral in Bangalore. Attendees discussed recent allegations of forced conversions to Christianity, and an attempt by the government to introduce an anti-conversion bill. After the attacks of 2008 and 2009, the KUCFHR began making representations to the Government every time incidents were reported from anywhere in the state.

In February 2011 the Karnataka United Christian Forum for Human Rights and the Karnataka Region Catholic Bishops' Council staged a sit-in protest over the findings from an investigation of a series of attack in September 2008 on Christian targets in southern Karnataka state. The report had failed to identify the attackers in 57 incidents involving Christian churches and other sites. Speaking at the KUCFHR meeting Rev. Bernad Moras said: "Let us not be intimidated by any threats or attacks, let us boldly profess, practise and propagate our faith". In August 2011 Fr Ronnie Prabhu, general secretary of the Karnataka United Christian Forum for Human Rights, reported that police had been calling on local clergymen saying they must register their prayer houses at the local police station. They were told that if they did not do so their meetings would be illegal and the police would not protect them.

In February 2023, The United Christian Forum for Human Rights has written to the President of India to request that the constitutional rights of the Christian community be protected. In a document expressing deep concern over 597 incidents of violence committed against Christians in 21 states in India, it petitioned the President to ask both the Union and State governments to safeguard the rights and freedom of the Christian community to practice its faith, run its educational facilities, and live with respect throughout India, as its safety has come under severe threat.
