= NavGujarat Samay =

Indian newspaper

NavGujarat Samay નવગુજરાત સમય

- Front page from 21 May 2016
- Type: Daily newspaper
- Format: Broadsheet
- Owner(s): Shayona Times Pvt Ltd (Shayona Group and The Times Group)
- Publisher: The Times Group
- Editor-in-chief: Ajay Umat
- Founded: 16 January 2014
- Language: Gujarati
- Circulation: 1,48,000
- Sister newspapers: The Times of India; The Economic Times; Navbharat Times; Maharashtra Times; Vijaya Karnataka
- Website: epaper.navgujaratsamay.com

NavGujarat Samay is a Gujarati language broadsheet daily newspaper from The Times Group. It was launched in Ahmedabad, India on 16 January 2014 to cater to vernacular language readers of Gujarat. Later, The Times Group formed joint venture Shayona Times Private Limited with Suresh Patel-owned Shayona Group, which is engaged in construction activity in Ahmedabad.
