= 1999 Ranalai violence =

Anti-Christian violence

- Date: 15 March 1999
- Location: Ranalai, Gajapati district, Odisha. 19.2236840°N 84.2407218°E
- Caused by: Hate Speech; Mass mobilization; Religious nationalism
- Goals: Religious persecution
- Methods: Arson; Looting

Casualties
- Injuries: 14 (3 injured by gun shots)
- Arrested: 40
- Buildings destroyed: 147-157 Christian houses completely burned down

1999 Ranalai violence refers to the incident of violence that occurred on March 15, 1999, in the village of Ranalai in Gajapati district of Orissa. The violence occurred after a dispute of adding religious symbols in the Khamani Hill of the village. A crowd of 2000 people, reportedly followers of the Sangh Parivar, armed with country made guns and weapons, completely burned down 157 Christian houses and looted the remaining Christian houses in the village. 14 Christians were injured including three injured by gun shots. An investigation by the National Commission for Minorities (NCM) blamed the Bharatiya Janata Party (BJP) for the violence.

The dispute started, when a Christian cross that had been inscribed on a hill from 1972 was erased by a mob. This was after a meeting by Rashtriya Swayamsevak Sangh (RSS) and Vishwa Hindu Parishad (VHP) in the village the previous day where it was decided to remove the symbol. This was quickly mediated by a peace committee formed by the villagers. Later, some followers of Sangh Parivar changed it into the icon of Lord Jagannath. This was also mediated by the peace committee and the villagers agreed that the hill would not display any religious icon. A group of villagers of the peace committee went to the hill to wipe off the present symbol on March 15. Violence broke out when a mob of 2000 people, reportedly followers of the Sangh Parivar reached the hill at the same time and painted an image of the trishul. The mob then proceeded to the village and went on to attack.

Some villagers blamed the RSS, the VHP and the Vanavasi Kalyan Ashram for instigating communal hatred and said that they were living peacefully before for generations. The Christians in the village claimed that the Bharatiya Janata Party (BJP) used the symbol to provoke hostility between both the communities. Many news reports attributed the violence to an earlier meeting organized by the BJP where a local leader claimed that a cross can easily be changed into a trishul, the Chief minister of Odisha also acknowledged these statements made by the BJP leader. The National Commission for Minorities reported that the incident was planned and not a stray incident and also accused the BJP for the violence.

== Background ==
Ranalai is a Christian majority village in the Gajapati district in southern Orissa bordering Andhra Pradesh. The Gajapati district had 121,197 Christians according to the Census of 1991. After Sundergarh District, its Christian population was the second largest in the state. Most of these Christians, belonged either to the Scheduled Castes or the Kui and Saura tribes. The village is surrounded by Hills and jungles. The village had nearly 400 homes and 250 of those belonged to the Christians. Most of the villagers were small farmers and landless workers. Since the 1930s, Christians have been living in Ranalai with their less numerous Hindu neighbors in peace.

=== The cross painting ===
Since there was no church in the village, the Christians in the village inscribed a cross on the nearby Khamani hill. They also used the venue for conducting religious gatherings and for religious congregations.

=== Tensions ===
On March 7, 1999, the RSS and the VHP organised a meeting in the village. It was decided at the meeting to erase the cross that was drawn on the hill. The villagers of Ranalai claimed that people from other villages also attended the meeting.

On March 8, 1999, a large mob gathered for a meeting and after the assembly they went to the Khamani Hill and removed the cross painting. This incident created tensions in the village. The residents of Ranilai sat together and agreed to resolve the situation in a friendly and peaceful manner. A peace committee was created with 10 members from each religion, and peace was finally returned. The cross was painted in its original location.

On March 15, 1999, a group of Sangh Parivar adherents gathered once again on the Khamani hill and removed the painting of the cross again and painted the "Chaka Ankhj", the icon of Lord Jagannath, in its place. This brought back the tensions once again to the village. The Village Peace Committee took up the problem and it was agreed that the hill would not display any symbol of either party and that the Hindus of the Peace Committee would remove the current symbol. In the meantime, some Christians in the village reported the incident to the local police station and asked for security for a perceived attack.

== Attacks ==
Peace was restored for a brief period of time following the decision of the committee. As determined by the committee, 10 people belonging to the Hindu community went to the Khamani Hill on March 15 to remove the present symbol. At this same time, a crowd of around 2,000 people, reportedly adherents of the Sangh Parivar, gathered on the hill and painted the "trishul", the sign of Shiva. They shouted slogans like "Jai Shri Ram" and "Jai Ram", the people from neighboring villages were also present there.

The crowd made offensive slogans and marched towards the village in procession. They surrounded the Christian area with traditional weapons, arrows and country made guns. The Christians began to flee after they sensed an impending attack. The villagers claimed that the attackers used kerosene and petrol. 147 Christian houses were entirely burned down during the attack. Other reports stated that 157 houses were burnt down. The remaining houses of the Christians in the villages were looted and it was reported that none of the Christian houses in the villages were left untouched. While Christians were the majority in the village, as the crowd brought in followers from the neighboring villages, they were outnumbered.

14 Christians were injured during the attacks including three with bullet injuries. The people injured by bullets were shifted to the Berampur medical college. The victims were forced to take shelter below trees as the temperature soared to 40 degree Celsius due to the lack of speedy medical services. 40 people were arrested.

== Investigations ==
Some residents in the village claimed that the two communities were living peacefully for generations. They accused the leaders of the RSS, the Vanavasi Kalyan Ashram and the VHP for inciting communal hate. Some people from the Oriya Sahi stated that they were asked to erase the cross by the leaders of the RSS and the VHP who also claimed that the cross was six to seven years old, while Christians said that the cross had been there since 1971. The Christians in the village claimed that the local members of the BJP used the symbol to provoke hostility, but the local party leader rejected it.

The report by the United States Bureau of Democracy, Human Rights, and Labor stated that 157 Christian houses were torched, 12 persons were injured and 26 people from both the communities were arrested. The report also stated that the head of the local BJP, Bharat Paik, reportedly said that Christians had burned their own houses.

The state police said that the mob was led by a man from Bajrang Dal.

=== Meeting by BJP ===
As per news reports, the affected inhabitants of Ranalai attributed the attack to a public meeting organized by the BJP in the area on 1 February 1999. Initially the Chief Minister Giridhar Gamang was quiet on this statement, he later explained that he'd been awaiting to "ascertain facts". Later, Gamang acknowledged that the leader of the BJP had said at the gathering that the symbol of the cross could seamlessly be modified to that of a trishula.

=== National Commission for Minorities ===
The National Commission for Minorities (NCM), which investigated the incident, blamed the BJP of inciting the attack. It accused the police of failing to protect the Christian community. The NCM stated that a senior BJP leader had sparked the religious emotions of the recent rally and asked the Hindus to paint a trishula over the cross. The NCM reported that he symbol of the cross, which was on the hill since 1972, has never been a source of disagreement. "It all started after the BJP rally," said Bawa Singh, a member of the NCM. The NCM also stated that the attack was planned and was not a random event.

The nature of violence and the fact that certain people from outside village were involved in it are all remarkably similar to incidents that have occurred in other parts of the country. It's all connected together. About 160 Christian houses were burned down within a couple of hours. This could only be feasible with an organized and planned attack.

— National Commission for Minorities.

== Continued tensions ==
The Christians claimed that since the local police had stood with the attackers who were arrested, they were granted bail. They also claimed that after their release, the attackers were taken away by RSS and BJP members in a parade and a meeting was also held to support them. In October 2020, Ranalai's villagers also claimed that during the 1999 Indian general election, miscreants attacked them for not endorsing the BJP.

== Bibliography ==
- Puniyani, Ram (2006). The politics behind anti Christian violence : a compilation of investigation committee reports into acts of violence against the Christian minorities. Delhi: Media House. ISBN 81-7495-237-3. OCLC 182969294.
- United States Department of State (2000). Annual Report, International Religious Freedom 1999, Report Submitted to the Committee on International Relations, U.S. House of Representatives and the Committee on Foreign Relations, United States Senate by the Department of State in Accordance with Section 102 of the International Religious Freedom Act of 1998. U.S. Government Printing Office. ISBN 978-0-16-060235-1.
- All India Federation of Organisations for Democratic Rights (1999). Then They Came for the Christians: A Report to the Nation : Report of an All-India Fact Finding Team, Constituted by All India Federation of Organisations for Democratic Rights (AIFOFDR). All India Federation of Organisations for Democratic Rights. (Available online)
