= Netrang =

- Location in Gujarat, India Netrang (India)
- Coordinates: 21.639°N 73.362°E
- Country: India
- State: Gujarat
- District: Bharuch
- Taluka: Netrang
- Elevation: 435 m (1,427 ft)

Languages
  - Official: Gujarati, Hindi
- Time zone: UTC+5:30 (IST)
- PIN: 393130
- Telephone code: 02643
- ISO 3166 code: IN-GJ
- Vehicle registration: GJ-16
- Nearest cities: Rajpipla, Ankleshwar, Bharuch, Vadodara
- Literacy: 60%
- Avg. summer temperature: 40 °C (104 °F)
- Avg. winter temperature: 20 °C (68 °F)

Netrang is a town in the Netrang taluka in Bharuch district of the Indian state of Gujarat.

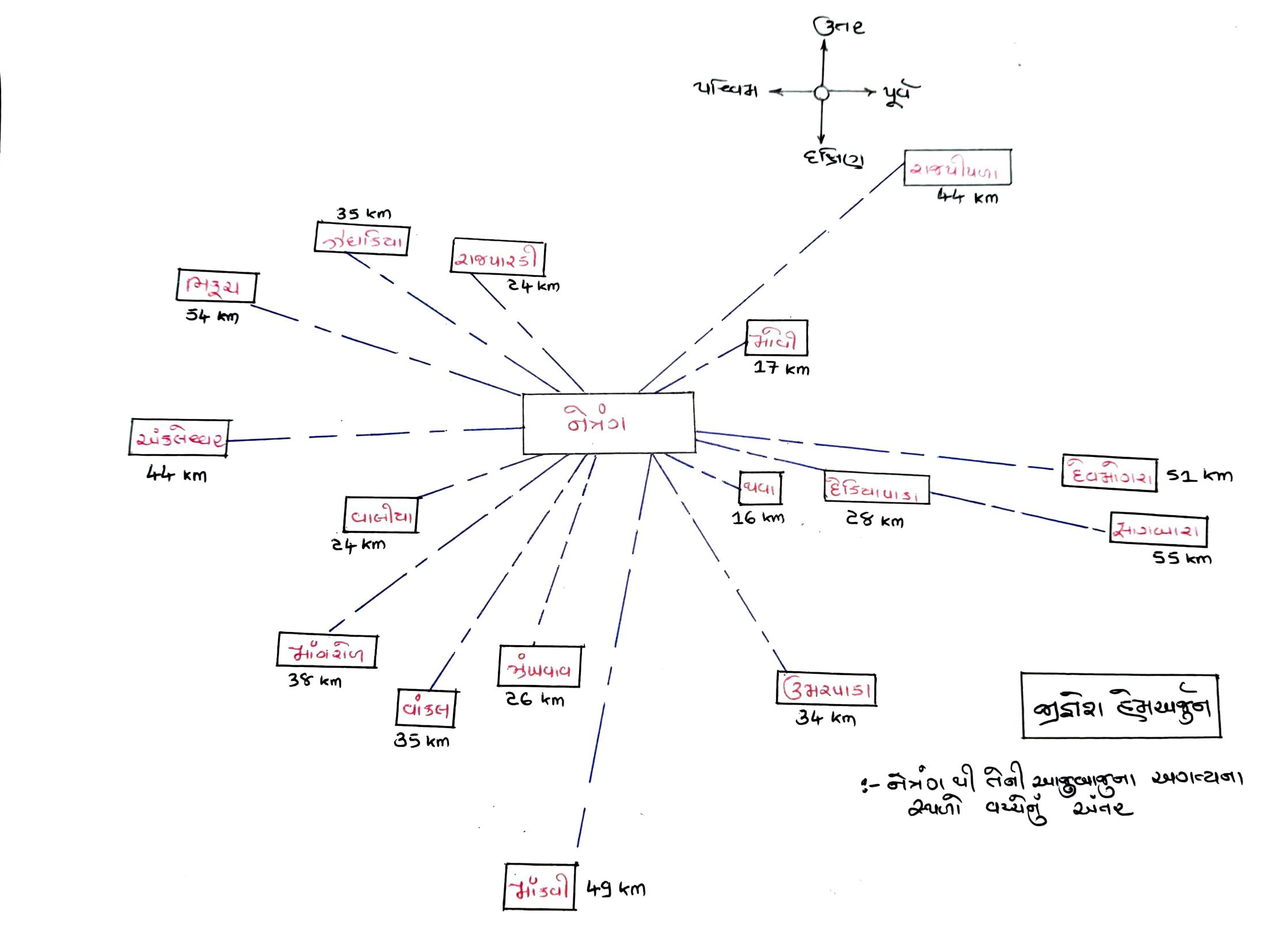

== Geography and climate ==
Netrang lies in the southern part of the Gujarat peninsula at an elevation of 435 metres (1,427 ft) and has a tropical savanna climate (under Köppen's Climate classification), moderated by the Arabian Sea. The summer begins in early March and lasts until June. April and May are the hottest months, the average maximum temperature being 43 °C (109 °F). The monsoon season begins in late June and the town receives about 800 millimetres (31 in) of rain by the end of September, with the average maximum temperature being 32 °C (90 °F) during those months. October and November see the retreat of the monsoon and a return of high temperatures until late November. Winter starts in December and ends in late February, with average temperatures of around 23 °C (73 °F).

== Transport ==
Netrang is well connected by National Highway 753B, National Highway 56 & Gujarat State Highways 13, 5, and 163. Netrang has a last railway station from ankleshwar jhagadiya route, but it is off posission since 1995 and the nearest railway stations are about 20 kilometres (12 mi) away from the town, in Kevdi, Umalla, Zankhvav, and Juna Rajuvadiya, while a major railway station is located in ankleshwar 43 km.west of Netrang. The nearest airport to Netrang are the Surat Airport and the Civil Airport Harni in Vadodara, 100 kilometres (62 mi) north of Netrang.

== Education ==
- Smt. M M Bhakta Highschool
- Gujarati Prathmik Sala (Gujarati Primary School) Gandhi Bajar
- Gujarati Sala (Juna Netrang)
- Shri R K Bhakta School
- Sandipani School
- GSL Public School (Pre-primary School)
- Prathmik Sala (Kosyakola)
- Aadarsh Nivasi Sala
- Govt. Arts and Commerce College and many others.

== Tourism ==
Netrang is located in the lap of nature. Nature at its best during the season of monsoon and winter. Here are some of the place(s) around the town you can visit during the season:

- Statue of Unity (65 km from netrang)
- Kadiya Dungar (13 km from netrang, on Rajpardi road)
- Vishal Khadi Campsite (20 km from netrang, on Rajpipala road)
- Timroliya Dasha Maa Temple, Arethi (09 km from netrang, on Dediyapada road)
- Baladava Dam (04 km from netrang, on Dediyapada road)
- Ghanikut (Rampam Waterfall) (13 km from netrang, on Dediyapada road)
- Mandan lake (26 km from netrang on Rajpipala road)

== Hotels and Restaurants ==
- Club Mahindra Resort - Netrang, Gujarat
- Malhar Restaurant
- Shri Ganesh Restaurant
- Kabir Brew Cafe
- Annapurna Restaurant
- Gayatri Bhojanalay
- Jay Siyaram Bhojanalay
- Gandhi Complex
- The Pizza Hub
- Sai Guesthouse
- Ananda Hotel
- Krupalu Guesthouse

== See also ==
- Kingdom of Rajpipla
- List of state highways in Gujarat
- Netrang : Therapy to tame timid minds.
