= Zankhvav =

- Neighbourhood
- Location in Gujarat, India Zankhvav (India)
- Coordinates: 21.448°N 73.319°E
- Country: India
- State: Gujarat
- District: Surat

Government
  - Body: Surat Municipal Corporation

Languages
  - Official: Gujarati, Hindi
- Time zone: UTC+5:30 (IST)
- PIN: 394440
- Telephone code: 91261-XXX-XXXX
- Vehicle registration: GJ
- Lok Sabha constituency: Bardoli
- Civic agency: Surat Municipal Corporation
- Website: gujaratindia.com

Zankhvav (also spelled Zankvav or Zankhavav) is a small town-cum-railway station in Surat District, Gujarat, India. It falls under Surat Metropolitan Region. It is 60 km (37 mi) from district town of Surat. The nearest town, Kosamba, is 17 km (11 mi) away.

Zankvav is also the terminus station of the Kosamba - Zankhvav railway line. This railway line was built by Gaekwar's Baroda State Railway in 1900 as a narrow-gauge line. However, the train now runs on broad gauge. The station code is ZKV.

The State Highway 166 Kosamba-Velachha-Mangrol-Vankal-Zankhvav Road connects Zankvav to other cities.

The Postal Index Code of Zankhvav is 394440.

Zankhvav has a high school, Shantiniketan High School, which started in 1963. The town has a Community Health Center and an Industrial Training Institute.

== See also ==
- List of tourist attractions in Surat
