= Vanavasi Kalyan Ashram =

Indian social welfare organization

- Formation: 1952|12|26
- Founded: December 1952
- Founder: Balasaheb Deshpande
- Type: NGO
- Purpose: The tribal society residing in the remote forests and mountains of the country is the true custodian of Indian traditions and culture. Despite being an integral part of India's heritage, unfortunately, the tribal community has suffered severe neglect. To eliminate this neglect and bring the light of development to the tribal society, strengthening the sentiment of ‘ तू – मैं एक रक्त ' the Akhil Bharatiya Vanvasi Kalyan Ashram is actively working across the nation.
- Headquarters: Jashpur
- Location: Jashpurnagar, India
- Region served: Health care, education
- Founder: Mr. Ramakant Keshav and Mr. Bala Saheb Deshpande
- Parent organization: Rashtriya Swayamsevak Sangh
- Affiliations: Sangh_Parivar
- Website: https://kalyanashram.org/

Vanavasi Kalyan Ashram (lit. Tribal Welfare Monastery) is an Indian social welfare organization based in Jashpur, in the Chhattisgarh state of India. It focuses on the welfare activities of members of Scheduled Tribes in remote areas of India. The organization is a constituent of the Sangh Parivar, the family of organisations affiliated with the Rashtriya Swayamsevak Sangh, (RSS).

== History ==
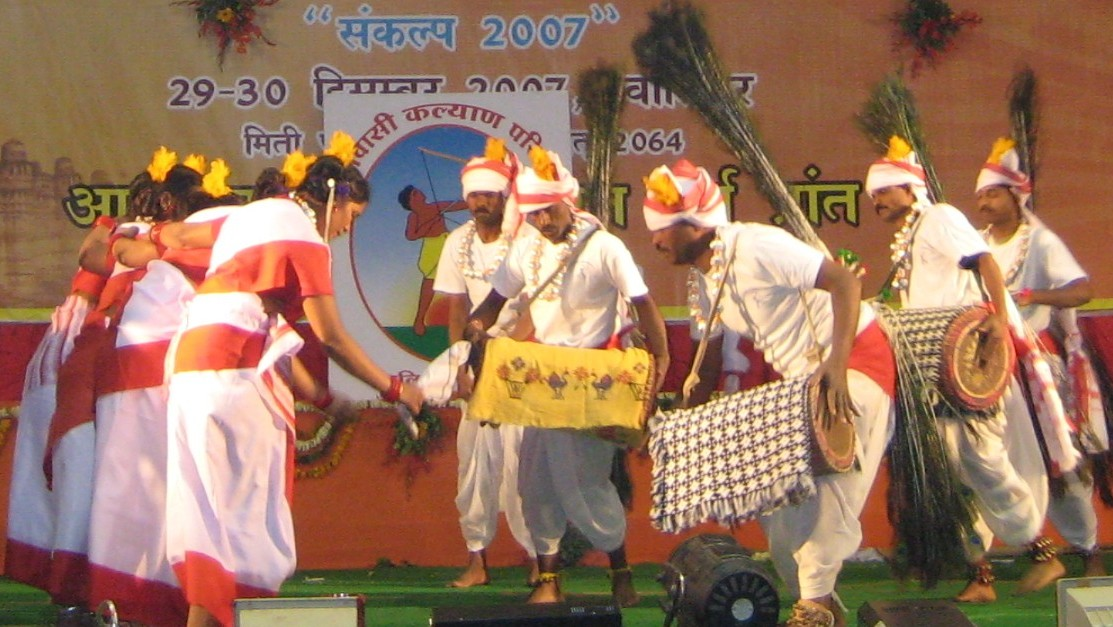
Folk dance by tribal at Vanavasi Kalyan Ashram function

The Kalyan Ashram was founded in 1952 by Ramakant Keshav Deshpande (also known as Balasaheb Deshpande), an ex-official of the Madhya Prasdesh State Department of Tribal Welfare, with the support of the State Government and the RSS. After Independence, Balasaheb was appointed by the then Ravi Shankar Shukla Government to work in tribal-dominated Jashpur area as ‘Regional Officer’ of the ‘Tribal Development Scheme’. Its aim was to counter the appeal of Christian missionary schools to the tribals. Based in Jashpur (214 km from Raigarh), it established schools in Raigarh and Surguja districts - areas with large tribal populations. The Ashram grew rapidly and a permanent office was established in 1963, inaugurated by the RSS chief M. S. Golwalkar.

In 1977, it acquired national status (expressed in its new name, Bhāratiya Vanavāsi Kalyān Āshram). From 1978 to 1983, the number of its full-time volunteers rose from 44 to 264 (56 of whom were tribal). In Jashpur, a hospital was established, and schools, hotels, and centers for apprenticeship in manual trades were also established in 40 villages. The programs are presently located in 312 districts throughout the country and are supervised by more than a thousand full-time workers. While most districts have primary schools, many other places have residential schools, hostels, libraries, and health centers. Important annual events include establishing medical camps, playing traditional sports, and celebrating tribal festivals.

== See also ==
- Akhara
- Akshaya Patra Foundation
- Education in India
- Ekal Vidyalaya
- Gurukula
- History of education in the Indian subcontinent
- Rashtriya Swayamsevak Sangh
- Swami Lakshamanananda
- Vidya Bharti
