= National Highway 752I (India) =

National highway in India

National Highway 752I
- Map of National Highway 752I in red

Route information
- Auxiliary route of NH 52
- Length: 406 km (252 mi)

Major junctions
- West end: NH 160B / NH 752G in Kopargaon
- List: NH 52 in Karodi; NH 753A / NH 753F in Chhatrapati Sambhajinagar; NH 753M in Deogaon; NH 753C / NH 753H in Jalna; NH 548B / NH 548C in Mantha; NH 752K in Jintur; NH 161 / NH 361 in Ardhapur; NH 161A in Himayatnagar
- East end: NH 361 in Mahagaon

Location
- Country: India
- States: Maharashtra

Highway system
- Roads in India; Expressways; National; State; Asian
← NH 752H	→ NH 752K

National Highway 752I, commonly referred to as NH 752I is a national highway in India. It is a spur road of National Highway 52. NH-752I traverses the state Maharashtra in India.

== Route ==
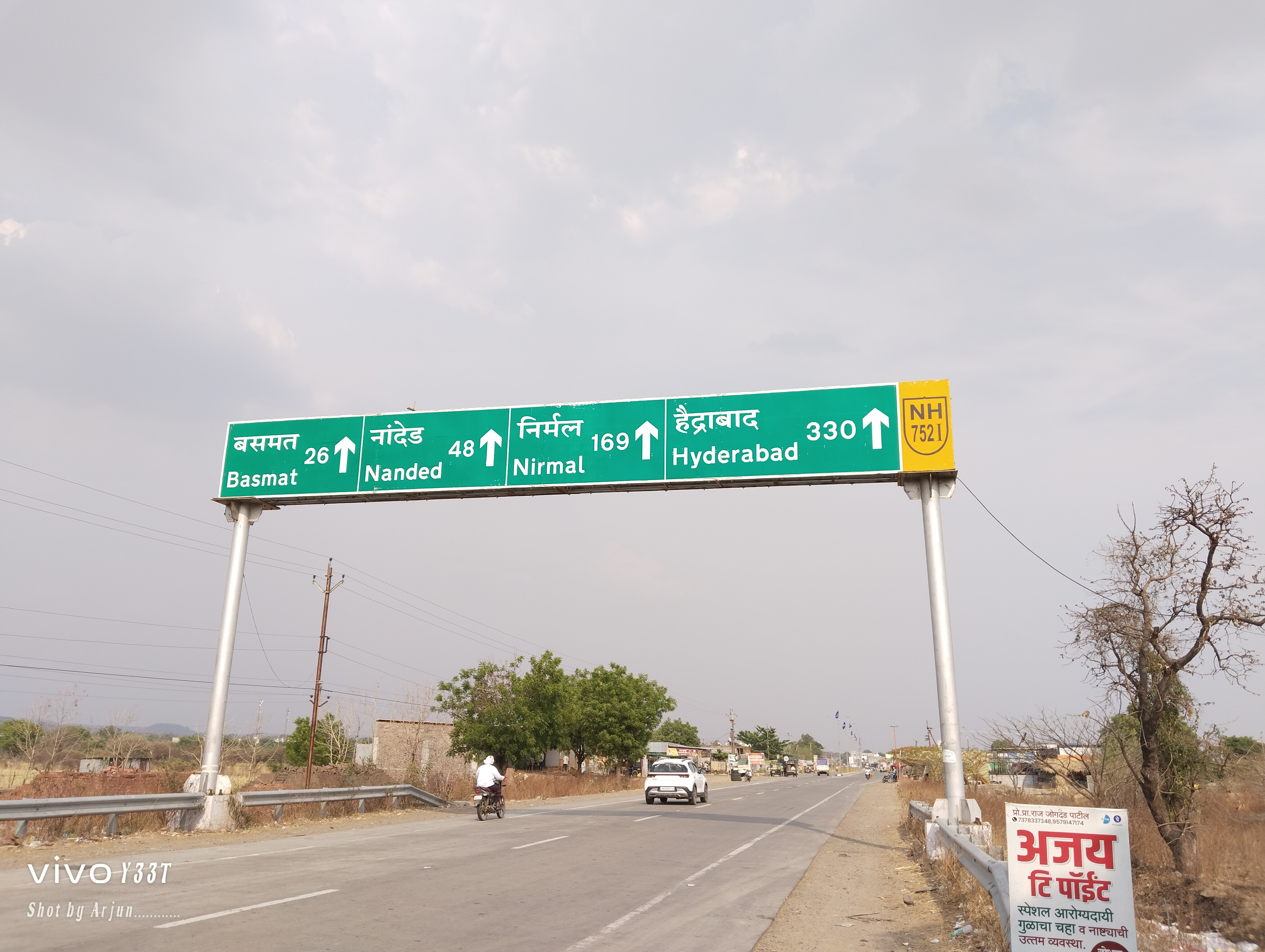
NH 752I

Kopargaon, Vaijapur, Lasur, Aurangabad, Jalana Watur, Mantha, Jintur, Aunda Nagnath, Basmat, Ardhapur, Tamsa, Himayatnagar, Dhanki Phulsawangi, Mahur, Dhanoda.

== See also ==
- List of national highways in India
- List of national highways in India by state
