= National Highway 753C (India) =

National Highway in India

National Highway 753C
- Map of National Highway 753C in red

Route information
- Auxiliary route of NH 53
- Length: 285.5 km (177.4 mi)

Major junctions
- West end: Jalna
- East end: Pulgaon

Location
- Country: India
- States: Maharashtra

Highway system
- Roads in India; Expressways; National; State; Asian
← NH 753A	→ NH 347A

National Highway 753C, commonly referred to as NH 753C is a national highway in India. It is a secondary route of National Highway 53. NH-753C runs in the state of Maharashtra in India.

== Route ==
NH753C connects Jalna Bypass, Sindhkhed Raja, Dusrabid, Bibi, Sultanpur, Mehkar, Dongaon, Kenwad, Malegaon Jahangir, Shelu bazar, Karanja, Bramhankhed, Kherda, Pimpalgaon, Vaghoda, Dashasar, Talegaon and Pulgaon in the state of Maharashtra.

== Junctions ==
NH 753A Terminal near Jalna.
NH 548C near Sultanpur
NH 548CC near Mehkar
NH 461B near Malegaon
NH 161 near Malegaon
NH 161A near Shelu bazar
NH 161E near Karanja
NH 361C near Karanja
NH 347A Terminal near Pulgaon.

== See also ==
- List of national highways in India
- List of national highways in India by state
