= National Highway 753F (India) =

National highway in India

National Highway 753F
- Map of National Highway 753F in red

Route information
- Auxiliary route of NH 53
- Length: 538.8 km (334.8 mi)

Major junctions
- North end: NH 53 in Jalgaon
- List: NH 753L in Pahur; NH 753E in Ajanta; NH 753H in Sillod; NH 752H in Phulambri; NH 52 / NH 752H in Chhatrapati Sambhajinagar; NH 160C in Ghodegaon; NH 61 / NH 160 / NH 561 / NH 561A in Ahilyanagar; NH 761 in Shirur; NH 548D in Shikrapur; NH 548DD in Lani Kand; NH 48 / NH 60 / NH 65 in Pune; NH 66 in Mangaon
- South end: Dighi Port

Location
- Country: India
- States: Maharashtra

Highway system
- Roads in India; Expressways; National; State; Asian
| ← NH 753E | → NH 753H |

National Highway 753F, commonly referred to as NH 753F is a national highway in India. It is a spur road of National Highway 53. NH-753F traverses the state of Maharashtra in India.

== Route ==
Jalgaon, Pahur, Wakod ,Fardapur, Ajanta, Sillod, Phulambri, Aurangabad, Newasa, Wadala Bahiroba, Ghodegaon, Ahmadnagar, Shirur, Ranjangaon, Shikrapur, Pune, Paud, Mulshi, Tamhini, Nijampur, Mangaon, Mhasla, Dighi Port .

== See also ==
- List of national highways in India
- List of national highways in India by state
