= National Highway 47 (India) =

National highway in India

National Highway 47
- Map of the National Highway in red

Route information
- Length: 1,006 km (625 mi)

Major junctions
- West end: NH 27 in Bamanbore
- List: NH 51 in Limbdi; NE 8 / NH 147 / NH 751 in Sarkhej; NH 48 / NH 64 in Aslati; NE 1 in Ramol; NE 4 in Godhra; NH 147D in Limkheda; NH 56 in Dahod; NH 147E in Jhabua; NH 347C in Dhar; NH 156 in Ghatabillod; NH 52 / NH 347BG in Indore; NH 146B in Sandalpur; NH 347B in Hiwakhedi; NH 548C in Khedi Sawligarh; NH 46 in Betul; NH 347 / NH 347A in Multai; NH 547 / NH 547E / NH 753 in Saoner; NH 247 in Dahegaon; NH 53 in Nagpur
- East end: NH 44 in Nagpur

Location
- Country: India
- States: Gujarat, Madhya Pradesh, Maharashtra

Highway system
- Roads in India; Expressways; National; State; Asian
← NH 27	→ NH 44

National Highway 47 (NH 47) is a primary National Highway in India. It starts from Bamanbore in Gujarat and terminates at Nagpur in Maharashtra. This national highway is about 1,006 km (625 mi) long. Before renumbering of national highways in 2010, NH-47 was variously numbered as old national highways 8A, 59, 59A & 69.

== Route ==
Schematic map of National Highways in India

NH47 transits through three states of India namely Gujarat, Madhya Pradesh and Maharashtra.

Gujarat

Bamanbore, Limbdi, Ahmedabad, Godhra, Dahod - M.P. border

Madhya Pradesh

Gujarat border - Jhabua, Dhar, Indore, Harda, Betul, Pandhurna - Maharashtra border

Maharashtra

M.P. border - Saoner, Nagpur

== Toll plazas along NH-47 ==
- Bamanbore Toll Plaza
- Bagodara(MoRTH) Toll Plaza
- Pithai Toll Plaza
- Vavdi Khurd Toll Plaza
- Bhatwada Toll Plaza
- Dattigaon Toll Plaza
- Methwada Toll Plaza
- Betul Toll Plaza
- Khambara Toll Plaza
- Patansaogi Toll Plaza

== See also ==
- List of national highways in India
- List of national highways in India by state
