= National Highway 161B (India) =

National highway in India

National Highway 161B
- Map of the National Highway in red

Route information
- Length: 60 km (37 mi)

Major junctions
- East end: Nizampet
- West end: Bidar

Location
- Country: India
- States: Telangana (54 KM); Karnataka (7.4 KM)
- Major cities: Bidar, Narayankhed, Nizampet
- Primary destinations: Bidar, Narayankhed, Nizampet

Highway system
- Roads in India; Expressways; National; State; Asian
← NH 161	→ NH 161

National Highway 161B, commonly called NH 161B is a national highway in India. It is a spur road of National Highway 61 through NH 161. NH-161B traverses the state of Telangana in India.

== Route ==
Nizampet, Moodguntal, Narayanakhed, Manoor, Bellapur, Pulkurthi, Pipri, Ibrahimpur, Nyalkal, Athnoor, Dappur and terminating at Telangana/Karnataka border.

== Junctions ==
Terminal with National Highway 161 near Nizampet.

== See also ==
- List of national highways in India
- List of national highways in India by state
