= National Highway 160B (India) =

National Highway in India

National Highway 160B
- Map of National Highway 160B in red

Route information
- Auxiliary route of NH 60
- Length: 7 km (4.3 mi)

Major junctions
- West end: Zagade Phata
- East end: Kopargaon

Location
- Country: India
- States: Maharashtra

Highway system
- Roads in India; Expressways; National; State; Asian
← NH 160	→ NH 752G

National Highway 160B, commonly referred to as NH 160B is a national highway in India. It is a secondary route of National Highway 60. NH-160B runs in the state of Maharashtra in India.

== Route ==
NH160B connects Zagade Phata and Kopargaon in the state of Maharashtra.

== Junctions ==
NH 160 Terminal near Zagade Phata.
NH 752G Terminal near Kopargaon.

== See also ==
- List of national highways in India
- List of national highways in India by state
