= National Highway 753M (India) =

National highway in India

National Highway 753M
- Map of National Highway 753M in red

Route information
- Auxiliary route of NH 53
- Length: 111.7 km (69.4 mi)

Major junctions
- North end: Chikhali
- South end: Bhokardan

Location
- Country: India
- States: Maharashtra

Highway system
- Roads in India; Expressways; National; State; Asian
| ← NH 753A | → NH 752H |

National Highway 753M, commonly referred to as NH 753M is a national highway in India. It is a spur road of National Highway 53. NH-753M traverses the state of Maharashtra in India.

== Route ==
Chikhali, Dhad, Mahora, Bhokardan, Hasnabad - NH752H.

== Junctions ==
NH 753A Terminal near Chikhli.
NH 752H Terminal near Hasanbad.

== See also ==
- List of national highways in India
- List of national highways in India by state
