= National Highway 160H (India) =

National Highway in India

National Highway 160H
- Map of National Highway 160H in red

Route information
- Auxiliary route of NH 60
- Length: 124 km (77 mi)

Major junctions
- South end: Malegaon
- North end: Shahada

Location
- Country: India
- States: Maharashtra

Highway system
- Roads in India; Expressways; National; State; Asian
← NH 160	→ NH 752G

National Highway 160H, commonly referred to as NH 160H is a national highway in India. It is a secondary route of National Highway 60. NH-160H runs in the state of Maharashtra in India.

== Route ==
NH160H connects Malegaon, Chaugaon, Kusumbe, Mehargaon, Khwathi, Lamkhani, Shewade, Dondaicha, Sarangkheda, Sawalde and Shahada in the state of Maharashtra.

== Junctions ==
NH 160 Terminal near Malegaon.
NH 53 near Kusumbe
NH 753BB near
NH 752G Terminal near Shahada.

== See also ==
- List of national highways in India
- List of national highways in India by state
