= National Highway 353K (India) =

National highway in India

National Highway 353K
- Map of National Highway 353K in red

Route information
- Auxiliary route of NH 53
- Length: 95.7 km (59.5 mi)

Major junctions
- South end: Nandgaon Peth
- North end: Warud

Location
- Country: India
- States: Maharashtra

Highway system
- Roads in India; Expressways; National; State; Asian
| ← NH 53 | → NH 347A |

National Highway 353K, commonly referred to as NH 353K is a national highway in India. It is a spur road of National Highway 53. NH-353K traverses the state of Maharashtra in India.

== Route ==
Nandgaon Peth, Shirkhed, Morshi, Warud.

== Junctions ==
NH 53 Terminal near Nandgaon Peth.
NH 353J near Morshi.
NH 347A Terminal near Warud.

== See also ==
- List of national highways in India
- List of national highways in India by state
