= National Highway 561A (India) =

National highway in India

National Highway 561A
- Map of National Highway 561A in red

Route information
- Auxiliary route of NH 61
- Length: 301 km (187 mi)

Major junctions
- North end: Ahmednagar
- South end: Bijapur

Location
- Country: India
- States: Maharashtra, Karnataka

Highway system
- Roads in India; Expressways; National; State; Asian
← NH 61	→ NH 52

National Highway 561A, commonly referred to as NH 561A is a national highway in India. It is a spur road of National Highway 61. NH-561A traverses the states of Karnataka and Maharashtra in India.

== Route ==
Ahmednagar, Mirajgaon, Karmala, Jeur, Tembhurni, Karkamb, Pandharpur, Mangalwedha, Umadi, Balgaon Bijapur.

== Junctions ==
NH 61 and NH 561 Terminal near Ahmednagar.
NH 65 near Tembhurni.
NH 965 and NH 965C near Pandharpur.
NH 166 near Mangalwedha.
NH 52 Terminal near Bijapur.

== See also ==
- List of national highways in India
- List of national highways in India by state
