= National Highway 752E (India) =

National highway in India

National Highway 752E
- Map of National Highway 752E in red

Route information
- Auxiliary route of NH 52
- Length: 115.2 km (71.6 mi)

Major junctions
- North end: Paithan
- South end: Kharda

Location
- Country: India
- States: Maharashtra

Highway system
- Roads in India; Expressways; National; State; Asian

National Highway 752E, commonly referred to as NH 752E is a national highway in India. It is a spur road of National Highway 52. NH-752E traverses the state of Maharashtra in India.

== Route ==
Paithan, Mungi, Bodhegaon, Ghoanaspargaon, Ukhanda Chakla, Midsangvi, Shirur Kasar, Rakshasbhuwan, Kholyachiwadi, Kharegaon, Dongarkinhi, Chumbli, Patoda, Pargaon(Ghumra), Dighol and terminating at Kharda Tintraj, Dandegaon, Khandeshwarwadi, Ratnapur, Anala, Kandari, Paranda, Mungshi, Loni, Bitargaon, Kave, Mahadeowadi, Pandharpur .

== Junctions ==
NH 752F Terminal near Paithan.
NH 61
NH 561
NH 548D near Patoda.

== See also ==
- List of national highways in India
- List of national highways in India by state
