= National Highway 160A (India) =

National Highway in India

National Highway 160A
- Map of National Highway 160A in red

Route information
- Auxiliary route of NH 60
- Length: 170 km (110 mi)

Major junctions
- East end: Sinnar
- West end: Palghar

Location
- Country: India
- States: Maharashtra

Highway system
- Roads in India; Expressways; National; State; Asian
← NH 60	→ NH 48

National Highway 160A, commonly referred to as NH 160A is a national highway in India. It is a spur road of National Highway 60. NH-160A runs in the state of Maharashtra in India.

== Route ==
NH160A connects Sinnar, Ghoti, Trimbakeshwar, Mokhada, Jawhar, Vikramgad, Manor and Palghar in the state of Maharashtra.

== Junctions ==
NH 60 Terminal near Sinnar.
NH 160 near Ghoti.
NH 848 near Trimbak.
NH 48 near Manor.

== See also ==
- List of national highways in India
- List of national highways in India by state
