= Shikrapur, Maharashtra =

Village in Maharashtra

Shikrapur
- Village
- Location in Maharashtra, India Shikrapur (India)
- Coordinates: 18°41′37″N 074°08′17″E
- Country: India
- State: Maharashtra
- District: Pune
- Sub District: Shirur

Government
  - Type: Panchayati raj (India)
  - Body: Gram panchayat
- Elevation: 186 m (610 ft)

Population (2011)
  - Total: 19,374
  - Density: 861/km^{2} (2,230/sq mi)

Languages
  - Official: Marathi
- Time zone: UTC+5:30 (IST)
- PIN: 412208
- Telephone code: 02138
- Vehicle registration: MH 12
- Post Office: Shikrapur Post Office
- Police Station: Shikrapur - Talegoan Dhamdhere Police Station
- Public Transit Access: Pune Municipal Transport,
- Nearest city: Pune, Shirur
- Literacy: 89.62%
- Lok Sabha constituency: Shirur
- Vidhan Sabha constituency: Shirur
- Website: pune.nic.in

Shikrapur is a panchayat village in the state of Maharashtra, India. It is the urban growth centre of PMRDA and largest village in the Shirur Taluka of Pune District in Maharashtra.

== Geography ==
The village of Shikrapur lies at the junction of NH548D and NH753F. It is 36 kilometres (22 mi) from Pune, 34 kilometres (21 mi) from Shirur, and 26 kilometres (16 mi) southeast of the town of Chakan.

== Demographics ==
According to the 2011 census, the village of Shikrapur had a population of 19,374, with 10,259 males (53.1%) and 9,115 females (46.9%): a gender ratio of 882 females per thousand males. With Population Density 1202 people per km^{2}, it can be classified as Census Town.

== Economy ==
The area around Shikrapur is irrigated by canals and the Velu River, and is used for growing vegetables, sugarcane, onion and other crops. Sugarcane is supplied mainly to a sugar mill 5 km from Shikrapur and 30 km from Hadapser. The village holds a weekly open air market on Sunday.

More than 200 large- and small-scale industries are located in Shikrapur, some of these manufacturers like John Deere, Alicon, Trinity.

== Transportation ==
=== Highways ===
Shikrapur lies at the junction of the Nagar road, also called NH753F (Pune-Ahmednagar-Aurangabad-Jalgoan Highway), and the Shikrapur-Chakan road, also called NH548D (Talegoan Dabhade-Chakan-Shikrapur-Ahmedpur in latur). The highways to Pune have heavy traffic due to extensive growth in the Maharashtra Industrial Development Corporation (MIDC) area in Ranjangaon and part of Sanaswadi.

=== Buses ===
Maharashtra State Road Transport Corporation runs frequent bus service that stops at the city.

Pune Mahanagar Parivahan Mahamandal Limited (PMPML) also operates buses connecting Shikrapur to Pune, Pimpri-Chinchwad, and other cities. Students, commuters, and other users reach Pune on PMPML Bus No. 159 (Pune MaNaPa to Talegoan Dhamdhere bazar) and PMPML Bus No. 161(Wagholi to Karegaon- Ranjangaon).

=== Proposed railway project ===
The Pune Metropolitan Region Development Authority (PMRDA) has proposed a railway ring project to connect business hubs in Talegaon Dabhade, Chakan, Shikrapur, and Uruli Kanchan; Sambhaji International Airport at Purandar; and Pune Railway station. The proposed route begins in Talegaon Dabhade, linking the Pune-Miraj and Pune-Nashik rail routes, and would also connect with Metro rail.

PMRDA-contracted Larsen & Toubro created a common minimum programme (CMP) to coordinate a geographical spread of 20 km^{2}. The CMP includes Pune Municipal Corporation (PMC), Pimpri Chinchwad Municipal Corporation (PCMC), Pune Cantonment Board, Dehu Cantonment Board (DCB) and Khadki Cantonment Board (KCB) and Pune District.

=== Proposed Wagholi-Shikrapur bypass ===
The Pune Metropolitan Region Development Authority (PMRDA) and the district administration had planned 6-laning and forming a new bypass to mitigate frequent traffic congestion on the stretch connecting Pune, Wagholi and Shikrapur.

The plan involves a proposed bridge of 25 kilometres (16 mi) on State Highway 27, the addition of one lane in each direction, two bypasses and the improvement of crucial junctions. The government has approved ₹6.5 billion for the plan, and it is also part of the union government's Bharatmala project, which allocates ₹12.6 billion for road improvement. However, the project has been pending for many years.

== Educational institutions ==
=== Council for the Indian School Certificate Examinations | ICSE-affiliated schools ===
- Kasturi Educational Campus | Pratima Palande Memorial School, Shikrapur

=== CBSE-affiliated schools ===
- Jawahar Navodaya Vidyalay, Pimple Jagtap
- Amrutwel Global School
- Takshashila Gurukul Public School
- C.S. Bhujbal Global School
- Shree Sidhivinayak School
- Jaywant Public School, Sanaswadi

=== Children's schools ===
- ZPPS 24 Mail, Shikrapur
- Holy Spirit English Medium School, Talegoan Rd, Shikrapur
- Lexicon Kids School
- Gurukul International
- Podar Jumbo Kids School, Chakan -Shikrapur Road, Shikrapur

=== Maharashtra Board-affiliated schools and junior colleges ===
- ZPPS, Shikrapur
- ZPPS 24 Mail, Shikrapur
- Vidyadham Secondary School
- Vidyadham Prasahala Science, Art & Commerce, Shikrapur
- Ajinkyatara English medium School
- Jawahar Navoday Vidyalay, Karandi
- Jaywant Public School, Sanaswadi

=== Colleges ===
- Kasturi Educational Campus | College of Polytechnic
- Kasturi Educational Campus | College of Pharmacy
- Kasturi Educational Campus | College of B.Ed.
- Institute of Knowledge | College of Engineering
- Micro-Tech Institute of Technology
