= National Highway 953 (India) =

National highway in India

National Highway 953
- Map of the National Highway in red

Route information
- Length: 198 km (123 mi)

Major junctions
- North end: Songadh
- South end: Pimpalgaon Baswant

Location
- Country: India
- States: Gujarat, Maharashtra

Highway system
- Roads in India; Expressways; National; State; Asian
← NH 53	→ NH 60

National Highway 953, commonly called NH 953 is a national highway in India. It is a spur road of National Highway 53. NH-953 traverses the states of Gujarat and Maharashtra in India.

== Route ==
Songadh, Subir Ahwa, Saputara, Vani, Pimpalgaon Baswant.

== Junctions ==
NH 53 Terminal near Songadh.
NH 60 Terminal near Pimpalgaon Baswant.

== See also ==
- List of national highways in India
- List of national highways in India by state
