= National Highway 347C (India) =

National highway in India

National Highway 347C
- Map of the National Highway in red

Route information
- Length: 237 km (147 mi)

Major junctions
- North end: Dhar
- South end: Burhanpur

Location
- Country: India
- States: Madhya Pradesh, Maharashtra

Highway system
- Roads in India; Expressways; National; State; Asian
← NH 47	→ NH 52

National Highway 347C, commonly referred to as NH 347C is a national highway in India. It is a spur road of National Highway 47. NH-347C traverses the states of Madhya Pradesh and Maharashtra in India.

== Route ==
Madhya Pradesh

Dhar, Gujri, Khalghat, Kasarwad, Khargaon, Bistan, Baner - Maharashtra border.

Maharashtra

Madhya Pradesh border - Palpadlya, Raver - Madhya Pradesh border.

Madhya Pradesh

Maharashtra border - Burhanpur.

== Junctions ==
NH 47 Terminal near Dhar.
NH 52 near Khalghat.
NH 347B near Khargone.
NH 753L Terminal near Burhanpur.

== See also ==
- List of national highways in India
- List of national highways in India by state
