= National Highway 752K (India) =

National highway in India

National Highway 752K
- Map of National Highway 752K in red

Route information
- Auxiliary route of NH 52
- Length: 254 km (158 mi)

Major junctions
- North end: Jintur
- South end: Bhalki

Location
- Country: India
- States: Maharashtra, Karnataka

Highway system
- Roads in India; Expressways; National; State; Asian
← NH 752I	→ NH 50

National Highway 752K, commonly referred to as NH 752K is a national highway in India. It is a spur road of National Highway 52. NH-752K traverses the states of Maharashtra and Karnataka in India.

== Route ==
Jintur, Bori, Zari, Parbhani, Gangakhed, Isad, Kingaon, Dhanora, Jadhala bus stand , WadvalNagnath,Chakur, Gharani, Nalegoan,Latur, Babhalgaon, Nitur, Nilanga, Sirshi, Aurad Shahajani, Bhalki.

== Junctions ==
NH 752I Terminal near Jintur.
NH 61 Terminal near Parbhani.
NH 548D Terminal near Kingaon.
NH 361 Terminal near Chakur.
NH 50 Terminal near Bhalki.

== See also ==
- List of national highways in India
- List of national highways in India by state
