= National Highway 753A (India) =

National highway in India

National Highway 753A
- Map of the National Highway in red

Route information
- Auxiliary route of NH 53
- Length: 205 km (127 mi)

Major junctions
- North end: Malkapur
- South end: Aurangabad

Location
- Country: India
- States: Maharashtra

Highway system
- Roads in India; Expressways; National; State; Asian
← NH 53	→ NH 52

National Highway 753A, commonly referred to as NH 753A is a national highway in India. It is a spur road of National Highway 53. NH-753A traverses the state of Maharashtra in India.

== Route ==
Malkapur, Buldhana, Chikhli, Deulgaon Raja, Jalna, Aurangabad.

== Junctions ==
NH 53 Terminal near Malkapur.
NH 753E near Buldhana.
NH 753M near Chikhli.
NH 752H near Deulgaon Raja.
NH 753H near Jalna
NH 753C near Jalna
NH 752I near Jalna
NH 52 Terminal near Aurangabad.

== See also ==
- List of national highways in India
- List of national highways in India by state
