= National Highway 965C (India) =

National highway in India

National Highway 965C
- Map of National Highway 965C in red

Route information
- Auxiliary route of NH 65
- Length: 49 km (30 mi)

Major junctions
- South end: Pandharpur
- North end: Kurudwadi

Location
- Country: India
- States: Maharashtra

Highway system
- Roads in India; Expressways; National; State; Asian
← NH 965	→ NH 548C

National Highway 965C, commonly referred to as NH 965C, is a national highway in India. It is a spur road of National Highway 65. NH-965C traverses the state of Maharashtra in India.

== Route ==
Pandharpur, Shetphal, Kurudwadi.

== Junctions ==
NH 965 Terminal near Pandharpur.
NH 65 near Shetphal.
NH 548C Terminal near Kurudwadi.

== See also ==
- List of national highways in India
- List of national highways in India by state
