= Amadade =

Village in Maharashtra

Amadade, is located in Bhadgaon Taluka, Jalgaon district, Maharashtra, India. It is one of big villages in Jalgaon district with political influence. It belongs to Khandesh region. It belongs to Nashik Division . It is located 51 km towards west from District headquarters Jalgaon; 7 km from Bhadgaon; 366 km from State capital Mumbai.
