= National Highway 361F (India) =

National Highway in India

National Highway 361F
- Map of National Highway 361F in red

Route information
- Auxiliary route of NH 61
- Length: 220 km (140 mi)

Major junctions
- East end: Loha
- West end: Kharwandi

Location
- Country: India
- States: Maharashtra

Highway system
- Roads in India; Expressways; National; State; Asian
| ← NH 361 | → NH 61 |

National Highway 361F, commonly referred to as NH 361F is a national highway in India. It is a secondary route of National Highway 61. NH-361F runs in the state of Maharashtra in India.

== Route ==
NH361F connects Loha, Palam, Gangakhed, Parli Vaijnath, Telgaon, Wadvani, Beed, Arvi and Kharwandi in the state of Maharashtra.

== Junctions ==
NH 361 Terminal near Loha.
NH 61 Terminal near Kharwandi.

== See also ==
- List of national highways in India
- List of national highways in India by state
