= National Highway 461B (India) =

National Highway in India

National Highway 461B
- Map of National Highway 461B in red

Route information
- Auxiliary route of NH 61
- Length: 97.5 km (60.6 mi)

Major junctions
- South end: Hingoli
- North end: Malegaon

Location
- Country: India
- States: Maharashtra

Highway system
- Roads in India; Expressways; National; State; Asian
← NH 161	→ NH 161

National Highway 461B, commonly referred to as NH 461B is a national highway in India. It is a secondary route of primary National Highway 61. NH-461B runs in the state of Maharashtra in India.

== Route ==
NH461B connects Hingoli, Namdeo, Narsi, Sengaon, pankanergaon Risod and Malegaon in the state of Maharashtra.

== Junctions ==
NH 161 Terminal near Hingoli.
NH 161 Terminal near Malegaon.

== See also ==
- List of national highways in India
- List of national highways in India by state
