= Tongaon =

Tongaon is a village in Bhadgaon tehsil of Jalgaon District in Maharashtra state, India.

== Demographics ==
Tongaon is one of the largest villages in Jalgaon District. As per the 2011 Census of India, Tongaon has 2,509 households with a population of 12,470 people, of which 6,490 are males and 5,980 are females.
