= National Highway 353I (India) =

Highway in India

National Highway 353I
- Map of National Highway 353I in red

Route information
- Auxiliary route of NH 53
- Length: 73 km (45 mi)

Major junctions
- East end: Wadi
- West end: Pavnar

Location
- Country: India
- States: Maharashtra

Highway system
- Roads in India; Expressways; National; State; Asian
← NH 53	→ NH 361

National Highway 353I, commonly referred to as NH 353I is a national highway in India. It is a spur route of National Highway 53. NH-353I traverses the state of Maharashtra in India.

== Route ==
- Wadi Near AH 46,
- Hingna,
- Jamtha,
- Samruddhi Mahamarg,
- Outer Ring road,
- Gumgaon,
- Salaidhabha,
- Butibori MIDC,
- Takalghat,
- Kapri Moreshwar,
- Asola,
- Dry Port at Sindi Railway,
- Pavnar,
- Surabardi,
- Alesur,
- Khadgaon,
- Fetri,
- NIT College,
- JIT College.

== Junctions ==
NH 53 Terminal near Wadi.
NH 361 Terminal near Pavnar.

== See also ==
- List of national highways in India
- List of national highways in India by state
