= Shahpur, Burhanpur =

Shahpur
- Town
- Location in Madhya Pradesh, India Shahpur (India)
- Coordinates: 21.23°N 76.22°E
- Country: India
- State: Madhya Pradesh
- District: Burhanpur

Government
  - Body: Nagar parishad
  - Nagar Parishad President: Smt. Sadhna Tiwari (BJP)
- Elevation: 238 m (781 ft)

Population (2011)
  - Total: 19,719

Languages
  - Official: Marathi Hindi
- Time zone: UTC+5:30 (IST)
- Pin code: 450445

Shahpur is a town and a nagar panchayat in Burhanpur district, in the Indian state of Madhya Pradesh. As of 2011, Shahpur had a population of 19,719. It is located on the Icchapur–Indore State Highway

Shahpur is one of the main centers of banana farming in Burhanpur district. Around 50 smaller villages are connected to Shahpur, leading to calls for the town to become a separate tehsil.

== History ==
Shahapur was the Deshmukhi seat of administration during the Maratha Empire and British rule.

From 1957 until 2003, the town had a separate MLA seat, which was subsequently merged with Burhanpur.

== Transport ==
Shahpur is situated on the Indore-Icchapur national highway (NH 753L), around 12 km (7.5 mi) from Burhanpur district.

The nearest airport is Devi Ahilya Bai Holkar Airport in Indore, 200 km away.

== Demographics ==
Religions in Shahpur (2011)
Religion	Percent
Hindus	74.18%
Muslims	17.68%
Jains	0.69%
Christians	0.05%
Sikhs	0.01%
Buddhists	7.38%
Other or not stated	0.02%

Shahpur Nagar Panchayat had a population of 19,719, of whom 10,174 were males while 9,545 were females as per Census India 2011.

The 0–6 population was 2,675, 13.57% of the total. The female sex ratio was 938 against the state average of 931. The child sex ratio in Shahpur was around 841 compared to the Madhya Pradesh state average of 918. The literacy rate was 70.21%, higher than the state average of 69.32%. In Shahpur, male literacy was around 77.87% while the female rate was 62.19%.

Most people are Marathi, observing Marathi traditions and festivals such as: Pola, Gudipadwa, Dashehra and Diwali. Shahpur is known for an annual buffalo fight held after Diwali.

Shahpur hosts over 4,062 houses to which it supplies amenities such as water and sewerage.

== Administration ==
It is authorized to build roads within the panchayat and impose taxes on properties under its jurisdiction.

== Education ==
Educational institutions include:

- Shahpur Pvt. Industrial Training Institute (ITI)
- Gyandeep hr. Sec. School Shahpur
- Swami Vivekanand College Shahpur
- Surya Punj Educational Academy Shahpur

== Notable people ==
- Nandkumar Singh Chauhan (1952-2021), BJP state president and member of parliament for Khandwa
