= National Highway 361C (India) =

National highway in India

National Highway 361C
- Map of National Highway 361C in red

Route information
- Auxiliary route of NH 61
- Length: 101.2 km (62.9 mi)

Major junctions
- North end: Digras
- South end: Murtizapur

Location
- Country: India
- States: Maharashtra

Highway system
- Roads in India; Expressways; National; State; Asian
← NH 361	→ NH 53

National Highway 361C, commonly referred to as NH 361C, is a national highway in India. It is a spur road of National Highway 61. NH-361C traverses the state of Maharashtra in India.

== Route ==
Digras, Donad, Darwha, Karanja, Mozor, Murtizapur.

== Junctions ==
NH 361 Terminal near Digras.
NH 53 Terminal near Murtizapur.

== See also ==
- List of national highways in India
- List of national highways in India by state
