= National Highway 361B (India) =

National highway in India

National Highway 361B
- Map of National Highway 361B in red

Route information
- Auxiliary route of NH 61
- Length: 50.5 km (31.4 mi)

Major junctions
- North end: Kalamb
- South end: Wadki

Location
- Country: India
- States: Maharashtra

Highway system
- Roads in India; Expressways; National; State; Asian
← NH 361	→ NH 44

National Highway 361B, commonly referred to as NH 361B, is a national highway in India. It is a spur road of National Highway 61. NH-361B traverses the state of Maharashtra in India.

== Route ==
Kalamb - Ralegaon - Kapsi - Sirasgaon - Vadner - Wadki.

== Junctions ==
NH 361 Terminal near Kalamb.
NH 44 Terminal near Wadki.

== See also ==
- List of national highways in India
- List of national highways in India by state
