= National Highway 160C (India) =

National Highway in India

National Highway 160C
- Map of National Highway 160C in red

Route information
- Auxiliary route of NH 60
- Length: 26.2 km (16.3 mi)

Major junctions
- West end: Rahuri
- East end: Shani Shingnapur

Location
- Country: India
- States: Maharashtra

Highway system
- Roads in India; Expressways; National; State; Asian
← NH 160	→ NH 753F

National Highway 160C, commonly referred to as NH 160C is a national highway in India. It is a secondary route of National Highway 60. NH-160C runs in the state of Maharashtra in India.

== Route ==
NH160C connects Rahuri, and Shani Shingnapur in the state of Maharashtra.

== Junctions ==
NH 160 Terminal near Rahuri.
NH 753F Terminal near Shingnapur.

== See also ==
- List of national highways in India
- List of national highways in India by state
