= National Highway 161E (India) =

National highway in India

National Highway 161E
- Map of National Highway 161E in red

Route information
- Auxiliary route of NH 61
- Length: 105 km (65 mi)

Major junctions
- South end: Washim
- North end: Hivra Bk

Location
- Country: India
- States: Maharashtra

Highway system
- Roads in India; Expressways; National; State; Asian
← NH 161	→ NH 53

National Highway 161E, commonly referred to as NH 161E, is a national highway in India. It is a spur road of National Highway 61. NH-161E traverses the state of Maharashtra in India.

== Route ==
Washim, Bhoyar, Shelgaon, Mangrulpir, Poghat, Karanja, Kamargaon, Hivra Bk.

== Junctions ==
NH 161 Terminal near Washim.
NH 53 Terminal near Hivra Bk.

== See also ==
- List of national highways in India
- List of national highways in India by state
