= National Highway 753BB (India) =

National Highway in India

National Highway 753BB
- Map of the National Highway in red

Route information
- Auxiliary route of NH 53
- Length: 72 km (45 mi)

Major junctions
- West end: Nandurbar
- East end: Songir

Location
- Country: India
- States: Maharashtra

Highway system
- Roads in India; Expressways; National; State; Asian
← NH 753B	→ NH 52

National Highway 753BB, commonly referred to as NH 753BB is a national highway in India. It is a secondary route of National Highway 53. NH-753BB runs in the state of Maharashtra in India.

== Route ==
NH753BB connects Nandurbar, Ghotane, Dondaicha, Bamne, Chillane, Kasbe, Shindkheda and Songir in the state of Maharashtra.

== Junctions ==
NH 753B Terminal near Nandurbar.
NH 160H near Dondaicha
NH 52 Terminal near Songir.

== See also ==
- List of national highways in India
- List of national highways in India by state
