= Payvihir, Maharashtra =

Village in Maharashtra

Payvihir is a medium-sized village situated in the district of Amrawati, Achalpur in the Indian state of Maharashtra. It is 641 km far from the state capital Mumbai.

National Highway 53 is used to reach here. The geo-coordinates of Payvihir are 21.2683° N, 77.3755° E. The postal code is 444808.

== Demographics ==
According to the Census of 2011, Payvihir had a population of 490. Out of the total population, 255 were males and 235 were females. The total numbers of children were 79, 40 were girls 39 were boys in the age bracket of 0–6 years.

== Language ==
The majority of the native of Payvihir speak Hindi & Marathi. Both languages used to during the interaction among the people.

== Surrounded Villages ==
The nearby villages to Pavvihir are Daryapur, Chandur Bz, Anjangaon S, Chikhaldara, Tawlar, Pathrot, Ramapur Bk, Sonapur, Parsapur, etc.

== Transport ==
The nearest railway station is Pathrot Railway Station which at the distance of 10.0 km whereas nearest bus station at the distance of 5 km.
