= National Highway 156 (India) =

National highway in India

National Highway 156
- Map of National Highway 156 in red

Route information
- Length: 337 km (209 mi)

Major junctions
- North end: Nimbahera, Rajasthan
- South end: Manpur, Madhya Pradesh

Location
- Country: India
- States: Rajasthan

Highway system
- Roads in India; Expressways; National; State; Asian
← NH 56	→ NH 52

National Highway 156, commonly referred to as NH 156, is an auxiliary highway or spur road of NH56 connecting the city of Nimbahera in Rajasthan to Manpur in Madhya Pradesh Border. The Highway runs for 337 kilometres (209 mi). This highway connects NH56 with NH52 acting as a Link Highway & also known as Chittaurgarh Road.

== Route ==
NH56 near Nimbahera - Mandsaur - Jaora - Ratlam - Badnawar - Lebad - NH52 near Manpur(Madhya Pradesh)

== Junctions ==
NH 56 Terminal near Nimbahera.
NH 147E near Mandsaur.
NH 147E near Ratlam.
NH 147D Terminal near Badnawar.
NH 47 near Lebad(Madhya Pradesh).
NH 52 Terminal near Manpur(Madhya Pradesh).
