= National Highway 147E (India) =

National Highway in India

National Highway 147E
- Map of National Highway 147E in red

Route information
- Auxiliary route of NH 47
- Length: 202 km (126 mi)

Major junctions
- South end: Jhabua
- North end: Mandsaur

Location
- Country: India
- States: Madhya Pradesh

Highway system
- Roads in India; Expressways; National; State; Asian
← NH 47	→ NH 147E

National Highway 147E, commonly referred to as NH 147E is a national highway in India. It is a spur road of National Highway 47. NH-147E traverses the state of Madhya Pradesh in India.

== Route ==
NH 147E connects Jhabua - Nawagaon - Raipuriya - Bamania - Ratlam - Jaora - Mandsaur.

== Junctions ==
NH 47 Terminal near Jhabua.
NH 156 near Ratlam.

== See also ==
- List of national highways in India
- List of national highways in India by state
