= Pimpalgaon Baswant =

Town in Maharashtra, India

- Town
- Location within Maharashtra Location within India
- Coordinates: 20°10′00″N 73°59′00″E
- Country: India
- State: Maharashtra
- District: Nashik
- Taluk: Niphad

Government
  - Type: town Panchayat

Area
  - Total: 28.95 km^{2} (11.18 sq mi)
- Elevation: 583 m (1,913 ft)

Population (2011)
  - Total: 41,559
  - Density: 1,436/km^{2} (3,718/sq mi)

Languages
  - Official: Marathi
- Time zone: UTC+5:30 (IST)
- PIN: 422209
- STD code: 02550
- Vehicle registration: MH-15

Pimpalgaon Baswant is a town in the Niphad Taluka of Nashik District, Maharashtra, India. It is located to the north of the Kadva River, about 28 kilometres northeast of the district capital Nashik and 16 kilometres northwest of the taluka capital Niphad. According to the 2011 census, the town has a population of 41,559.

The town derives its name Baswant from the local deity Baswanteshwar, whom a temple located inside the old town was dedicated to. It also helps to distinguish this town from other places named Pimpalgaon.

== Geography ==
Pimpalgaon Baswant is situated on the banks of a small river named Parashari. The National Highway 60 (India) passes through the town. Its average elevation is 583 metres above the sea level.

== Demographics ==
According to the 2011 Indian Census, there are 8,187 households in Pimpalgaon Baswant. Out of the 41,559 residents, 21,438 are male and 20,121 are female. The literacy rate is at 72.58%, with 16,359 of the male population and 13,806 of the female population being literate. Its census location code is 551291.

== Economy ==
Pimpalgaon Baswant, like most other towns in the Nashik District, is reliant on agricultural produce for its economy. It produces a variety of grapes, tomatoes, sugar cane, onions and raisins for both domestic consumption and exports.

== Schools ==
- Pimpalgaon High School, opened in 1942
- Kanya-vidyalay
- Rise The Xperiental School Of Excellence
- Bhimashanker English Medium School
- MVP’s Horizon Academy, Ran Mala

== Transport ==
Nearest airports: Nashik Airport (15 km), Shirdi Airport (68 km), Mumbai International Airport (197 km)

Nearest railway stations: Niphad (12 km), Nashik Road (29 km), Manmad Junction (49 km)
