= National Highway 548CC (India) =

National highway in India

National Highway 548CC
- Map of National Highway 548CC in red

Route information
- Auxiliary route of NH 48
- Length: 101.4 km (63.0 mi)

Major junctions
- South end: Mehkar
- North end: Khamgaon

Location
- Country: India
- States: Maharashtra

Highway system
- Roads in India; Expressways; National; State; Asian
← NH 548C	→ NH 53

National Highway 548CC, commonly referred to as NH 548CC is a national highway in India. It is a spur road of National Highway 48. NH-548CC traverses the state of Maharashtra in India.

== Route ==
Mehkar, Chikhali, Khamgaon.

== Junctions ==
NH 548C Terminal near Mehkar.
NH 53 Terminal near Khamgaon.

== See also ==
- List of national highways in India
- List of national highways in India by state
