= National Highway 761 (India) =

National Highway in India

National Highway 761
- Map of National Highway 761 in red

Route information
- Auxiliary route of NH 61
- Length: 49 km (30 mi)

Major junctions
- North end: Belhe
- South end: Shirur

Location
- Country: India
- States: Maharashtra

Highway system
- Roads in India; Expressways; National; State; Asian
← NH 61	→ NH 753F

National Highway 761, commonly referred to as NH 761 is a national highway in India. It is a secondary route of National Highway 61. NH-761 runs in the state of Maharashtra in India.

== Route ==
NH761 connects Belhe, Alkuti, Devibhoyare, Nighoj and Shirur in the state of Maharashtra.

== Junctions ==
NH 61 Terminal near Belhe.
NH 753F Terminal near Shirur.

== See also ==
- List of national highways in India
- List of national highways in India by state
