= National Highway 361 (India) =

National highway in India

National Highway 361
- Map of National Highway 361 in red

Route information
- Auxiliary route of NH 61
- Length: 548 km (341 mi)

Major junctions
- South end: Tuljapur
- NH 63 Latur NH 548B Latur NH 752K Latur NH 548D Ahmedpur NH 61 Nanded NH 161A Nanded NH 752I Ardhapur NH 161 Waranga NH 161A Dhanoda NH 361B Kalamb NH 353I Pavnar
- North end: Butibori, Nagpur

Location
- Country: India
- States: Maharashtra
- Primary destinations: Ausa - Latur - Nanded - Yavatmal - Wardha - Nagpur

Highway system
- Roads in India; Expressways; National; State; Asian
| ← NH 52 | → NH 44 |

National Highway 361, commonly called NH 361, is a national highway in India that runs entirely within the state of Maharashtra. Its western terminal is in Tuljapur near the intersection of NH 52 and the eastern terminal is in Butibori near Nagpur at the intersection of NH 44. The total length of the highway NH-361 is 548 km. It is a spur road of National Highway 61.

The highway passes through the Western Ghats (Sahyadri mountains) and is an important arterial road connecting the Konkan region with Western Maharashtra, Marathwada and Vidharbha regions in the state of Maharashtra.

In 2009, NHAI has announced the extension of existing NH 52 to Nagpur via Ausa-Latur-Nanded-Yavatmal-Wardha and connect it to the NH 61 at Ardhapur near Nanded.

== Route ==
The most important cities on this highway are: Tuljapur, Ausa, Latur, Chakur, Ahmedpur, Loha, Nanded, Umarkhed, Mahagaon, Arni, Yavatmal, Wardha, Buti Bori near Nagpur.

== Junction list ==
NH 52 Terminal near Tuljapur
NH 63 near Latur, Ashtamod.
NH 548B near Latur, Ausa
NH 752K near Latur
NH 548D near Ahmedpur
NH 61 near Nanded
NH 161A near Nanded
NH 752I near Ardhapur
NH 161 near Waranga Phata
NH 161A near Dhanoda
NH 361B near Kalamb
NH 353I near Pavnar
NH 44 Terminal near Butibori, Nagpur

== Project development ==
The entire NH 361 highway has been included in the national highway mega projects for upgradation to 4-lane. Out of this, the work for 4 planning of Nagpur-Wardha stretch of 76.4 km has been initiated by Maharashtra government at a cost of INR 145 crores (INR 1.45 Billion).The Highway has been converted into 4 lane from Mahagaon to Wardha which is 216 km long.

== See also ==
- List of national highways in India
- List of national highways in India by state
- National Highways Development Project
