= National Highway 753E (India) =

National highway in India

National Highway 753E
- Map of National Highway 753E in red

Route information
- Auxiliary route of NH 53
- Length: 100.8 km (62.6 mi)

Major junctions
- West end: Ajanta
- East end: Khamgaon

Location
- Country: India
- States: Maharashtra

Highway system
- Roads in India; Expressways; National; State; Asian
← NH 753F	→ NH 53

National Highway 753E, commonly referred to as NH 753E is a national highway in India. It is a spur road of National Highway 53. NH-753E traverses the state of Maharashtra in India.

== Route ==
Ajanta, Buldhana, Khamgaon.

== Junctions ==
NH 753F Terminal near Ajanta.
NH 753A near Buldhana.
NH 53 Terminal near Khamgaon.

== See also ==
- List of national highways in India
- List of national highways in India by state
