= National Highway 547E (India) =

National highway in India

National Highway 547E
- Map of the National Highway in red

Route information
- Length: 35 km (22 mi)

Major junctions
- North end: Saoner
- South end: Gondkhairi

Location
- Country: India
- States: Maharashtra

Highway system
- Roads in India; Expressways; National; State; Asian
← NH 47	→ NH 53

National Highway 547E, commonly referred to as NH 547E is a national highway in India. It is a spur road of National Highway 47. NH-547E traverses the state of Maharashtra in India.

== Route ==
Saoner, Dhapewada, Kalmeshwar, Gondkhairi.

== Junctions ==
NH 47 Terminal near Saoner.
NH 53 Terminal near Gondkhairi.

== See also ==
- List of national highways in India
- List of national highways in India by state
