= Bhadgaon, Maharashtra =

Bhadgaon
- City
- Location in Maharashtra, India
- Coordinates: 20.66°N 75.22°E
- Country: India
- State: Maharashtra
- District: Jalgaon
- Elevation: 269 m (883 ft)

Population (2011)
  - Total: 37,214

Languages
  - Official: Marathi
- Time zone: UTC+5:30 (IST)
- PIN: 424105
- Telephone code: +91-2596-
- ISO 3166 code: IN-MH
- Vehicle registration: MH-54
- Website: maharashtra.gov.in

Bhadgaon is a city and tehsil located in the Jalgaon District of the Indian state of Maharashtra. Its population is approximately 45,000-50,000 people. Its twin city is Pachora. The Nagerdeola railway station serves Bhadgaon City. The city's urban spans 48.27 square kilometres, and consists of three suburbs (Tongaon, Karab, and Wadhade). Both National Highway 753J and Maharashtra State Highway 25 run through the city. Bhadgaon is located 367 km from the state's capital, Mumbai.

== History ==
A copper-plate grant of the Rashtrakuta Emperor Govinda III found near Bhadgaon (Pachora Taluka) has been dated to Saka 732 (809 A.D.). It records the donation of a village called Bhaulavara in the Bahula vishaya, corresponding to the modern Pachora district.

Jalgaon seems to have come under the sway of the Imperial Rashtrakuta dynasty, with their capital at Manyakheta (modern Malkhed in North Karnataka in Karnataka State). The powerful rulers of this family extended their kingdom into the Deccan, Konkan, part of Gujarat and Central India up to the Vindhyas and remained in power until they were overthrown by Chalukya Tailapa in about 970 A.D.

The ancient name of the city was Battagram or possibly Bhattagram meaning Bhatt symbolizing warrior or Bhat meaning brilliant Brahmins (the highest caste in Hinduism).

The temple of Sidhivinayak was built under Peshawa rule. Near it are the Mahadev, Shani, Maruti temples, and Swami Samarha Kendra temples alongside the Girana river. The temple of Shiva (situated at Mahadeo Galli) was set up by Rishi Bhrugu near Girna River. (the position of the Girna river has changed over the last 70 years). Those who Mahashivrathi in this temple on the holy festival of the famous fair is organized by Panch Committee. Nowadays Bhadgaon suburb of the city is divided in Bhadgaon Peth and Old Bhadgaon.Tongaon Suburb is posh area consider as richest area of the city. Karab also newly developing Suburb in city.Wadhade suburb divided in old Wadhade and new Wadhade neighborhood of the Karab suburb. Once times village changes to town and now a day consider as city .

== Government ==
Bhadgaon has a Municipal council. Snehal Vispute was the first Chief Officer of Bhadgaon Municipal council. Shashikant Yeole was the first Nagaradhyaksha (Mayor) of Bhadgaon from 2009 to 2011. Ganesh Pardeshi was the Nagaradhyaksha in 2011. As of May 2012, Sau. Shubhangi Tushar Bhosle is the First Lady Nagaradhyaksha. There are two Government Guest Houses: one at the bank of river Girna (Girna Guest House) and second near a bus stand (B&C Guest House).Mr.Giradhar Mahadu Patil was 15 years mayor in ancient Bhadgaon consider as pioneer of the city.

Year	Male	Female	Total Population	Change	Religion (%)							
Year	Male	Female	Total Population	Change	Hindu	Muslim	Christian	Sikhs	Buddhist	Jain	Other religions and persuasions	Religion not stated
2011	19334	17880	37214	-	73.800	24.332	0.105	0.008	0.881	0.742	0.000	0.132

== Economy ==
Bhadgoan's key agricultural crops are bananas, sugarcane and black cotton. Plastic Moti industries and petroleum industries are expected to be a major industry as well. Masterline Lubricants has set up a manufacturing facility here helping to grow the rural economy.

== Education ==
Bhadgaon City has five high schools, three junior colleges, ITI colleges, two English medium schools, and one senior college. Chetana English Medium School is the first English medium school in Bhadgaon City. Sau. Sumantai Girdhar Patil high school and junior college are the oldest high schools in the city.

Senior College includes courses in Arts, Geography, Economics, History, and Marathi as a special subject course. Chemistry is a special subject. Bhadgaon City is improving in educational fields to improve rural knowledge.

There are more than 60 students admitted in Geography special departments that arrange activities such as educational tours, projects, seminars, fieldwork, conferences, workshops, guest lectures, exhibitions, and competitions. Department faculties are engaged in research work. Nearly 15 research papers have been published at the national and international level.

== See also ==
- Bhadgaon Municipal Council
