= National Highway 347BG (India) =

National Highway in India

National Highway 347BG
- Map of National Highway 347BG in red

Route information
- Auxiliary route of NH 47
- Length: 106 km (66 mi)

Major junctions
- South end: Deshgaon
- North end: Indore

Location
- Country: India
- States: Madhya Pradesh

Highway system
- Roads in India; Expressways; National; State; Asian
← NH 347B	→ NH 52

National Highway 347BG, commonly referred to as NH 347BG is a national highway in India. It is a secondary route of National Highway 47. NH-347BG runs in the state of Madhya Pradesh in India.

== Route ==
NH347BG connects Deshgaon, Sanawad, Barwaha and (Bhawarkua Chowk) at Indore in the state of Madhya Pradesh.

== Junctions ==
NH 347B Terminal near Deshgaon.
NH 52 Bhawarkuwa Terminal near Indore.

== See also ==
- List of national highways in India
- List of national highways in India by state
