= National Highway 753L (India) =

National highway in India

National Highway 753L
- Map of National Highway 753L in red

Route information
- Auxiliary route of NH 53
- Length: 166.3 km (103.3 mi)

Major junctions
- South end: Pahur
- North end: Deshgaon

Location
- Country: India
- States: Maharashtra, Madhya Pradesh

Highway system
- Roads in India; Expressways; National; State; Asian
| ← NH 753F | → NH 347B |

National Highway 753L, commonly referred to as NH 753L is a national highway in India. It is a spur road of National Highway 53. NH-753L traverses the states of Madhya Pradesh and Maharashtra in India.

== Route ==
Pahur, Jamner, Bodvad, Muktainagar, Burhanpur, Shahpur Icchapur, deshgaon.

== Junctions ==
NH 753F Terminal near Pahur.
NH 347B Terminal near Khandwa.

== See also ==
- List of national highways in India
- List of national highways in India by state
