= National Highway 753H (India) =

National Highway in India

National Highway 753H
- Map of National Highway 753H in red

Route information
- Auxiliary route of NH 61
- Length: 118.3 km (73.5 mi)

Major junctions
- North end: Bhokardna
- South end: Wadigodri

Location
- Country: India
- States: Maharashtra

Highway system
- Roads in India; Expressways; National; State; Asian
← NH 753F	→ NH 52

National Highway 753H, commonly referred to as NH 753H is a national highway in India. It is a secondary route of National Highway 53. NH-753H runs in the state of Maharashtra in India.

== Route ==
NH753H connects Sillod, Bhokardan, Rajur,Jalna, Ambad and Wadigodri in the state of Maharashtra.

== Junctions ==
NH 753F Terminal near Sillod.
NH 52 Terminal near Wadigodri.

== See also ==
- List of national highways in India
- List of national highways in India by state
