= National Highway 147D (India) =

National Highway in India

National Highway 147D
- Map of National Highway 147D in red

Route information
- Auxiliary route of NH 47
- Length: 157 km (98 mi)

Major junctions
- West end: Limkheda in Gujarat
- East end: Badnawar in Madhya Pradesh

Location
- Country: India
- States: Gujarat

Highway system
- Roads in India; Expressways; National; State; Asian
← NH 47	→ NH 156

National Highway 147D, commonly referred to as NH 147D is a national highway in India. It is a secondary route of National Highway 47. NH-147D runs in the state of Gujarat & Madhya Pradesh in India.

== Route ==
NH147D connects Limkheda, Limdi, Talava, Thandla, Petlavad, Badnawar in MP running for 157 kilometres (98 mi)

== Junctions ==
NH 47 Terminal near Limkheda.
NH 56 near Limdi.
NH 156 Terminal near Badnawar in Madhya Pradesh.

== See also ==
- List of national highways in India
- List of national highways in India by state
