= National Highway 548DD (India) =

National Highway in India

National Highway 548DD
- Map of National Highway 548DD in red

Route information
- Auxiliary route of NH 48
- Length: 44.4 km (27.6 mi)

Major junctions
- West end: Vadgaon
- East end: Lonikand

Location
- Country: India
- States: Maharashtra

Highway system
- Roads in India; Expressways; National; State; Asian
← NH 48	→ NH 753F

National Highway 548DD, commonly referred to as NH 548DD is a national highway in India. It is a secondary route of primary National Highway 48. NH-548DD runs in the state of Maharashtra in India.

== Route ==
NH548DD connects Vadgaon, Katraj, Kondwa, Undri, (Mantarwadi Chowk), Vadki, Loni-Kalbhor, Theur phata, Kesanand and Lonikand in the state of Maharashtra.

== Junctions ==
NH 48 Terminal near Vadgaon.
NH 753F near Lonikand

== See also ==
- List of national highways in India
- List of national highways in India by state
