= Banoti Waterfall =

Dharkund Dhareshwar waterfall (also known as Banoti Waterfall )is a remote and desolate location off the village of Talner / Banoti in the Soegaon / Kannad taluka of the Aurangabad district in the Maharashtra state of India. This waterfall is least known in spite of being quite picturesque and enchanting. Access to the place is difficult without involving a long trek from the nearest village of Talner via Kannad as compared to Banoti via Soegaon.

The importance of the waterfall is linked to archaeology and Buddhism, since there is an ancient Buddhist monastery of the fifth century CE. The monastery (or its remains) is not accessible (except with the help of a climbing rope). The existence of such an ancient monastery adjacent to the Banoti waterfall is largely unknown to the modern world except for some references in archaeological works. It was, indeed, this waterfall that cradled the ancient Buddhist monastery of Banoti, which was contemporary to the Ajanta cave temples.

The waterfall, however, is not large, its optical width being nearly 20 ft and elevation nearly 200 ft. It is a seasonal waterfall that runs during monsoon season.

== Facts ==
Country	India
State	Maharashtra
District	Chhatrapati SambhajiNagar
Taluka	Soegaon / Kannad
Coordinates	20.4430900° N, 075.3124130° E (20.443090, 075.312413)
Type	Plunge
Elevation	Approximately 200 ft (60 m)
Number of drops	1
Width	Approximately 20 ft (6 m)
Watercourse	Seasonal

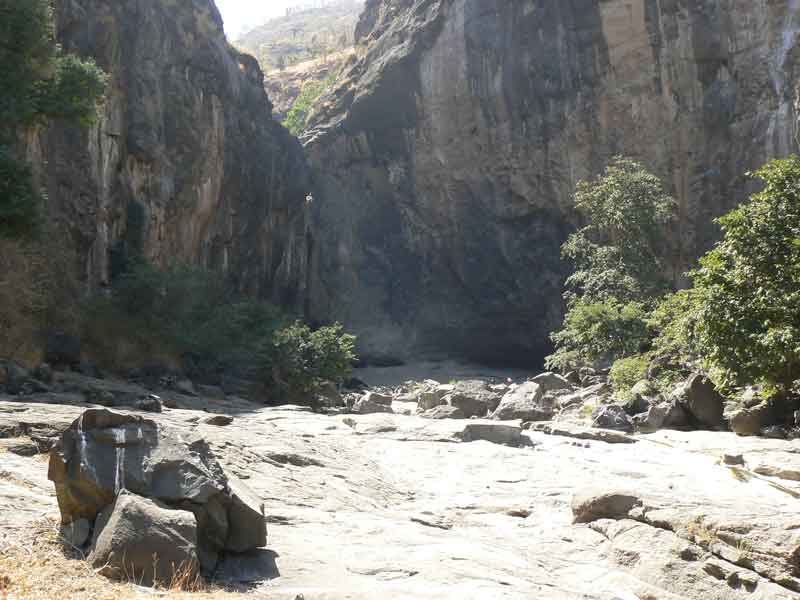
Banoti waterfall in summer

== Relative location and approach ==
- Nearest habitation or human settlement: Talner village (3 km trek) via Chincholi Limbaji and Vakki. Road : Sillod- Chalisgaon road.
- Another route is from Banoti village via soegaon (nearly 20 km trek)
- Nearest possible camp: Fardapur (via Soegaon: 48 km)
- Nearest district headquarters/ city: Jalgaon and Aurangabad
- Nearest serviced airport: Aurangabad, Maharashtra (148 km)

== Other location and approach ==
- Nageshwar Mahadev Temple, Talner, Maharashtra (2 km)
- Amruteshwar (Lord shiva) temple via banoti chaufuli 1 km.
- Lord shanidev temple via banoti chaufuli 1 km.
- Lord ganesha temple MSEB, Banoti.
- Naygaon ford Via banoti- Naygaon 4 km.

=== Major rail heads ===
- Jalgaon, Maharashtra (108 km via Fardapur; 73 km via Pachora)
- Bhusawal (97 km via Pachora and Jalgaon; 105 km via Fardapur and Jamner)
- Aurangabad (116 km via Kannad)
- Pachora (19 km via Gondegaon)
- Chalisgaon (43 km via Nagad)

== See also ==
- List of waterfalls of India
- List of waterfalls
