= Soegaon =

- Town and Taluka
- Location in Maharashtra, India Soegaon (India)
- Coordinates: 20.594093°N 75.617836°E
- Country: India
- State: Maharashtra
- District: Aurangabad district
- Established: 1953
- Named for: City of drama (Natypandhari)

Population
  - Total: c 30,000

Languages
  - Official: Marathi
- Time zone: UTC+5:30 (IST)
- PIN: 431120
- ISO 3166 code: IN-MH
- Nearest city: Aurangabad
- Lok Sabha constituency: Jalna and Aurangabad
- Vidhan Sabha constituency: Sillod-Soegaon

Soegaon or Soyagav is a town and a Taluka in Aurangabad district in the state of Maharashtra, India. It is the headquarters of Soegaon Taluka and is located at the base of Ajanta hills on Chhatrapati sambhajinagar- Jalgaon Highway in western India. The city is about 120 km from Aurangabad and 60 km from Jalgaon. It is a fast developing city in Aurangabad which has many historical places and scenery like Ajanta Caves, Ghatotkach fort, Vadi fort, Vetalvadi dam, etc.

== History ==
Nizam's own estate called “Sarf-e-Khas” comprising two talukas was merged with the Government area under Sarf-e-Khas (Merger) Regulation of 1949. Consequent upon the integration of Jagirs and Sarf-e-Khas areas, all the taluka boundaries were reconstituted in April 1950. Two new Mahals (Tahsils) with headquarters at Jafferabad were created. In 1953 another new mahal (tahsil) with headquarters at Soegaon was created by transferring 37 villages from Sillod taluka and 30 from Kannad taluka. All the villages transferred to this mahal are situated to the north of the Satmala hills. With the reorganisation of States in 1956, the district was transferred from Hyderabad State to Bombay State and since 1960 it forms a part of Maharashtra.

== Geography and tourism ==
Soegaon is lies near the source of Sona river. Soegaon is situated in the northern part of Aurangabad district. City is located on the border of Jalgaon Aurangabad district.

The Ajanta Caves are situated in this taluka, near the village of Fardapur. It is approximately 10 km from this village.

Near this city historical fort known as Ghatotkach and Vadi fort are located.

The Banoti waterfall is located nearby, as is the Gautala Wildlife Sanctuary.

== Religion ==
Religion in Soegaon Taluka (2011)
1. Hinduism (78.9%)
2. Islam (15.3%)
3. Buddhism (5.09%)
4. Jainism (0.14%)
5. Christianity (0.07%)
6. Sikhism (0.04%)
7. Others (0.45%)
