= National Highway 160D (India) =

National Highway in India

National Highway 160D
- Map of National Highway 160D in red

Route information
- Auxiliary route of NH 60
- Length: 48 km (30 mi)

Major junctions
- West end: Nandur Shingote
- East end: Kolhar

Location
- Country: India
- States: Maharashtra

Highway system
- Roads in India; Expressways; National; State; Asian
← NH 60	→ NH 160

National Highway 160D, commonly referred to as NH 160D is a national highway in India. It is a secondary route of National Highway 60. NH-160D runs in the state of Maharashtra in India.

== Route ==
NH160D connects Nandur Shingote, Dighe, Talegaon, Loni and Kolhar in the state of Maharashtra.

== Junctions ==
NH 60 Terminal near Nandur Shingote .
NH 160 Terminal near Kolhar.

== See also ==
- List of national highways in India
- List of national highways in India by state
