= National Highway 753J (India) =

National highway in India

National Highway 753J
- Map of National Highway 753J in red

Route information
- Auxiliary route of NH 53
- Length: 235 km (146 mi)

Major junctions
- North end: Jalgaon
- South end: Manmad

Location
- Country: India
- States: Maharashtra

Highway system
- Roads in India; Expressways; National; State; Asian
← NH 53	→ NH 752G

National Highway 753J, commonly referred to as NH 753J is a national highway in India. It is a spur road of National Highway 53. NH-753J traverses the state of Maharashtra in India.

== Route ==
Jalgaon, Mehrun, Shiroli, Samner, Lasgaon, Pachora, Bhadgaon, Chalisgaon, Tambole, Hirapur, Nyaydongri, Pimperkhed, Nandgaon, Manmad.

== Junctions ==
NH 53 Terminal near Jalgaon.
NH 752G Terminal near Manmad.

== See also ==
- List of national highways in India
- List of national highways in India by state
