= Ghatabillod =

Dehrisaray Dehri Saray
- Town
- Location in Madhya Pradesh, India Dehrisaray (India)
- Coordinates: 22°40′0″N 75°31′0″E
- Country: India
- State: Madhya Pradesh
- District: Dhar
- Elevation: 522 m (1,713 ft)

Population
  - Total: 10,000

Languages
  - Official: Hindi
- Time zone: UTC+5:30 (IST)
- ISO 3166 code: IN-MP
- Vehicle registration: MP
- Coastline: 0 kilometres (0 mi)
- Nearest city: Indore
- Sex ratio: 65/35 ♂/♀

Dehrisaray is a town in Dhar district in the Malwa zone portion of the Madhya Pradesh state of India. It is also known as Ghatabillod.

== Geography ==
It is located at 22°40′0″N 75°31′0″E with an elevation of 522 m above MSL. The Chambal river flows through the town.

== Location ==
National Highway 47 and State Highway 31 passes through Ghatabillod. It is at a distance of 35 km from Indore 25 km from Dhar and 95 km from Ujjain and Ratlam. The nearest airport is Devi Ahilyabai Holkar International Airport at Indore.

== Economy ==
There are many factories in this town like National Steel and Agro Industries Ltd., Bajrang Agro Industries & Tirupati Starch & Chemicals Ltd., IVRS, Jyoti overseas etc.
