= Shetphal, Karmala =

Village in Maharashtra

Coordinates: 17°54′N 75°26′E

Shetphal
- village
- Location in Maharashtra, India Shetphal (India)
- Country: India
- State: Maharashtra
- District: Solapur district

Languages
  - Official: Marathi
- Time zone: UTC+5:30 (IST)

Shetphal is a village in the Karmala taluka of Solapur district in Maharashtra state, India.

== Demographics ==
Covering 1,700 hectares (4,200 acres) and comprising 517 households at the time of the 2011 census of India, Shetphal had a population of 2374. There were 1262 males and 1112 females, with 259 people being aged six or younger.
