= Fardapur =

Village in Maharashtra

Coordinates: 20.582090°N 75.722891°E

Fardapur (alternatively, Phardapur) is a village located in Soegaon Taluka of Aurangabad district, in the Maharashtra state of India.

The population of Fardapur is approximately 10,000, some 90% of whom depend on agriculture.

The Soegaon Tahesil is located 15 kilometres (9.3 mi) away.

The Ajantha caves are located nearby.
