= Wadi, Maharashtra =

Wadi Duttawadi
- city
- Location in Maharashtra, India
- Coordinates: 21.1553°N 79.0109°E
- Country: India
- State: Maharashtra
- District: Nagpur

Government
  - Type: Municipal Council
  - Body: Wadi Municipal Council
  - Rank: 2nd in Nagpur District

Population (2011)
  - Total: 40,147
- Demonym: Wadikar

Languages
  - Official: Marathi
- Time zone: UTC+5:30 (IST)
- ISO 3166 code: IN-MH
- Website: maharashtra.gov.in

Wadi is a city and a municipal council in the Nagpur district of the Indian state of Maharashtra. It connected with National Highway NH-53, National Highway NH-353I, National Highway NH-353J.

== Demographics ==
As of 2011 India census, Wadi had a population of 40,147. Males constitute 53% of the population and females 47%. Wadi has an average literacy rate of 78%, higher than the national average of 59.5%: Male literacy is 82%, and female literacy is 74%. In Wadi, 14% of the population is under 6 years of age.

== Other Features ==
Godowns (warehouses) are common place in wadi. NH53 also a (Asian highway 46) traverses through Wadi.
