= Karkamb =

Village in Maharashtra

Karkamb Karkam
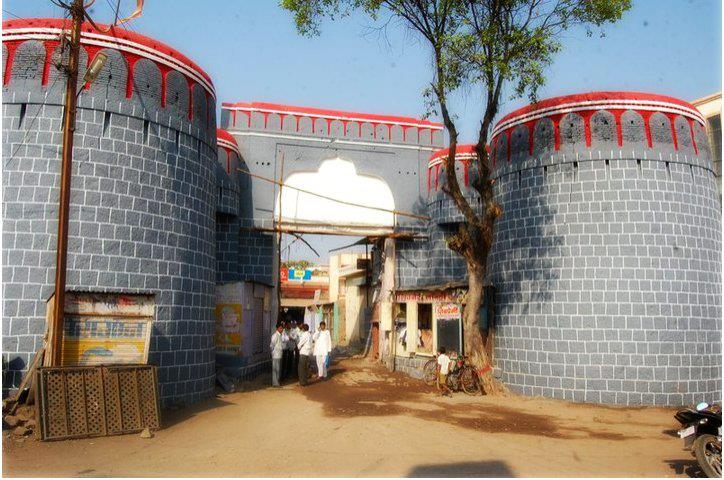
- Village Historical Vesh

- Location in Maharashtra, India
- Coordinates: 17°51′46.8″N 75°17′53.3″E
- Country: India
- State: Maharashtra
- District: Solapur
- Tehsil: Pandharpur

Government
  - Type: Gram Panchayat
  - Body: Sarpanch

Area
  - Total: 62.11 km^{2} (23.98 sq mi)

Population (2011)
  - Total: 17,456
  - Density: 281.0/km^{2} (727.9/sq mi)

Languages
  - Official: Marathi
- Time zone: UTC+5:30 (IST)
- Postal code: 413302
- Telephone code: 02186
- Vehicle registration: MH-13
- Lok Sabha constituency: Solapur
- Vidhan Sabha constituency: Madha
- Website: www.karkamb.mahapanchayat.gov.in/home

Karkamb is a village in Pandharpur Tehsil in Solapur district of the state of Maharashtra, India. Karkamb is the biggest village in Pandharpur Tehsil by population and it is mainly known for grapes production. Its name is derived from Kankamba Devi Temple in the village.

== Demographics ==
In 2011, the village had 2,845 households and a population of 16398 (9,073males and 8,383 females).

== History ==
Karkamb is a well known historical place. The village has historical significance. Karkamb was a prominent part of the Maratha Empire. Sambhaji Maharaj visited Karkamb in during their reign. It is said that the temple of the 'KANKAMBA DEVI' (Village Deity) was built by the Chhatrapati Sambhaji Maharaj. Karkamb is also famous as a birthplace of 'Bajari Amati' (Market Curry).

== Kankamba Devi Temple ==
Chatrapati Shivaji Maharaj historical steps are in Karkamb village. Kankamba Devi Temple in Karkamb from whom the village of Karkamb derives its name. Each year festival is celebrated. Many events are arranged during this period. Temple is famous and many peoples visit from all around nearby villages.

== Makdum Shah Baba Dargah ==
Each year a Fair (Urs or Urus or jatra) is arranged and celebrated in Karkamb, which is a symbol of Hindu-Muslim unity in the village.

== Notable landmarks ==
- Kankamba Devi Temple
- Makdum Shah Baba Tomb
- Lal Masoba
- Vijay Sugar
- Gajanan Bappa Sanjiwan Samadhi
- Sidhhanath temple

== Economy ==
Karkamb's economy is primarily driven by agriculture. Grape processing factories and sugar factories are found in the area.

Karkamb is famous for grape production. Kanak Chaman a co-operative company established in 1985 made big changes to the economy in karkamb. They built India's first co-operative cold storage in Karkamb. It is enraguated by chief minister of maharashtra Mr Sharad Pawar. Karkamb grapes are exported to the Western and several Middle Eastern countries.

Nowadays Pomegranate orchards and its production is very large in Karkamb.

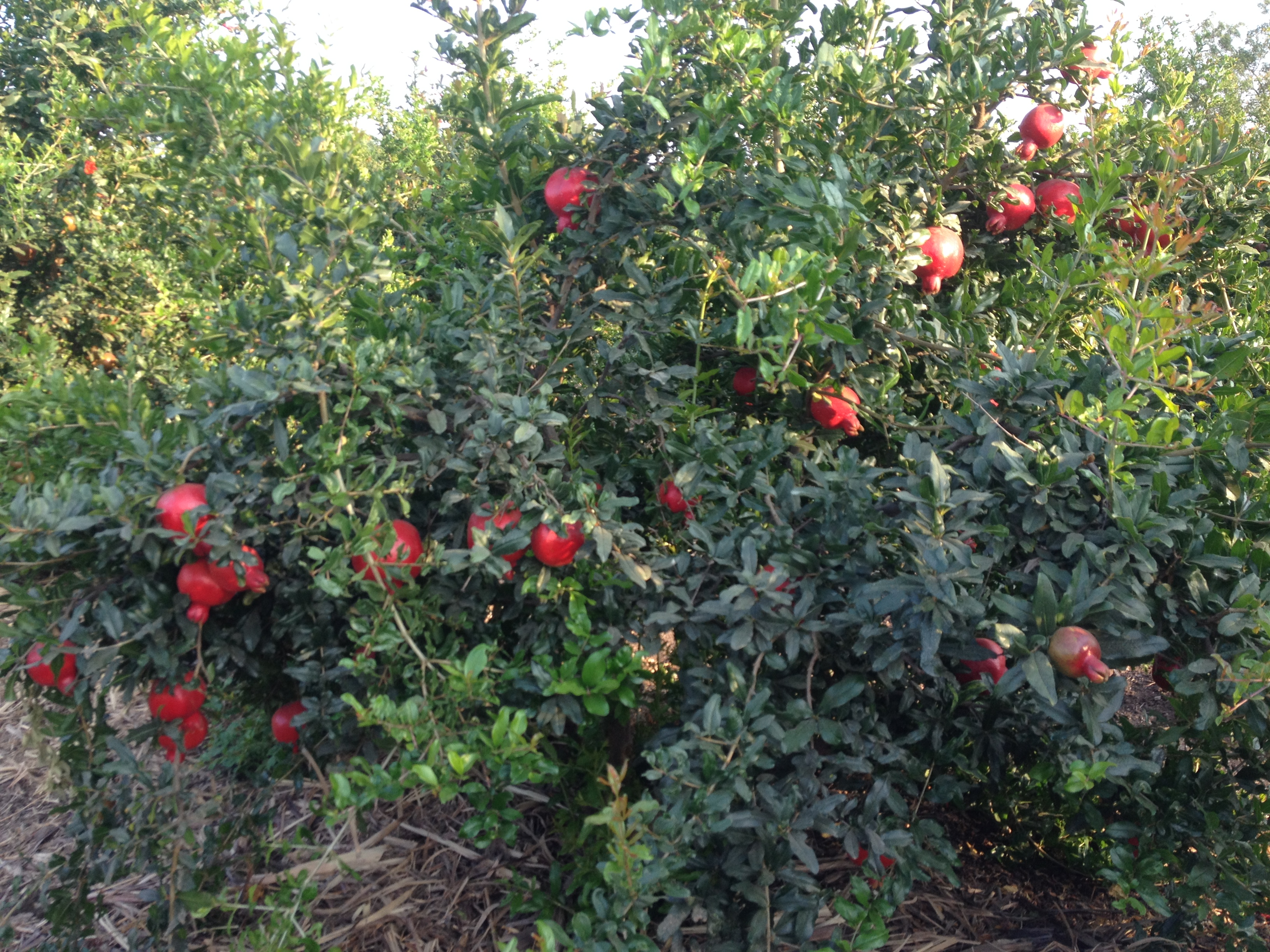

== Transport ==
Karkamb have important road connection on the Pandharpur-Tembhurni route. S.T Buses are passes from Pandharpur, Tembhurni and Solapur. Distance between Karkamb and Solapur is 78.6 km vie NH65 and 89.5 km vie NH204 (Tembhurni to Pandharpur) and NH65. Distance between Karkamb and Pandharpur is 22.0 km. Distance between Karkamb and Tembhurni is 26.5 km.

== Education ==
Colleges and schools found in Karkamb include the following:

- Adarsh Prashala & Jr. College Karkamb
- Dayanand College Commities, Rambhau Joshi, High school, Karkamb
- New English School, Karkamb
- Galaxy English Medium School
