= Icchapur =

Town in Madhya Pradesh, India

- Town
- Location in Madhya Pradesh, India
- Coordinates: 21.15°N 76.15°E
- Country: India
- State: Madhya Pradesh
- District: Burhanpur
- Elevation: 252 m (827 ft)

Population (2011)
  - Total: 10,434
- Time zone: UTC+5:30 (IST)

Icchapur (Village id 506221) is a town in Burhanpur District of Madhya Pradesh in India. It's Famous for its Icchadevi Temple.

== Demographics ==
As per Census 2011, Ichhapur has a population of 10,434, with 5,388 males and 5,046 females. A total of 2319 families reside here. In 2011, the literacy rate of Ichhapur town was 76.01%. In Ichhapur Male literacy stands at 84.55% while female literacy rate was 66.91%.

== Ichha Devi Temple ==
Ichha Devi Temple is located in Burhanpur tehsil about 21 km from Burhanpur on the Burhanpur-Edalabad main road. It is situated in Ichhapur on the border of Madhya Pradesh and Maharashtra.

== Transportation ==
Ichhapur is located on NH 753L which connects Maharastra from Madhya Pradesh. It is well connected with Burhanpur by roads.
