= Bhadgaon Municipal Council =

Type
- Type: Municipal Council of the Bhadgaon

History
- Founded: 2015

Leadership
- President: Atul Patil, Shivsena
- Municipal Chief Officer: Vikas Navale
- Deputy President: Wasim Mirza
- Seats: 21

Elections
- Last election: 18-January-2015

Bhadgaon is the municipal council in Jalgaon district, Maharashtra.

== History ==
The Bhadgaon municipal council established in 2015.

== Municipal Council election ==
=== Electoral performance 2015 ===
S.No.	Party name	Alliance	Party flag or symbol	Number of Corporators
01	Shiv Sena (SS)	NDA		09
02	Bharatiya Janata Party (BJP)	NDA		01
03	Indian National Congress (INC)	UPA		00
04	Nationalist Congress Party (NCP)	UPA		10
05	Independent	Independent		01
