= National Highway 347B (India) =

National highway in India

National Highway 347B
- Map of the National Highway in red

Route information
- Length: 287 km (178 mi)

Major junctions
- East end: Kheri
- West end: Barwani

Location
- Country: India
- States: Madhya Pradesh

Highway system
- Roads in India; Expressways; National; State; Asian
← NH 47	→ NH 52

National Highway 347B, commonly referred to as NH 347B is a national highway in India. It is a spur road of National Highway 47. NH-347B traverses the state of Madhya Pradesh in India.

== Route ==
Kheri, Ashapur (excluding the stretch from Ashapur to Khandwa) Khandwa, Chhegaon Makhan (excluding stretch from Chhegaon Makhan to Deshgaon ) Bhikangaon, Deshgaon, Khargone, Julwania, Thikri, Anjad, Barwani.

== Junctions ==
NH 47 Terminal near Kheri.
NH 347BG near Deshgaon
NH 347C near Khargone.
NH 52 near Julwania.

== See also ==
- List of national highways in India
- List of national highways in India by state
