= Chikhli, Maharashtra =

Chikhli चिखली
- City
- Nickname: Political capital of Buldhana District
- Location in Maharashtra, India
- Coordinates: 20.3505°N 76.2577°E
- Country: India
- State: Maharashtra
- District: Buldhana
- Formation: Pre-Independence Era
- Taluka Headquarters: Since Colonial Era
- Founder: Historically developed (No specific founder recorded)

Government
  - Type: Municipal Council
  - Body: Chikhli Municipal Council
  - MLA: Shweta Mahale (BJP)
  - President Municipal Council: Panditrao Deshmukh BJP
  - Deputy President Municipal Council: Vaishali Khedekar SS

Area
  - Total: 15.51 km^{2} (5.99 sq mi)
  - Rank: 2nd largest in Buldhana District
- Elevation: 606 m (1,988 ft)

Population (2021 (Estimated from Census 2011))
  - Total: 147,896
  - Rank: 2nd in District; 47th in Maharashtra; 840th in India
- Demonym: Chikhlikar

Languages
  - Official: Marathi
- Time zone: UTC+5:30 (IST)
- PIN: 443201
- Telephone code: 00-91-7264
- ISO 3166 code: IN-MH
- Vehicle registration: MH-28
- Known for its proximity to the Satpuda Hills and fertile agricultural land.

Chikhli is a city and a municipal council in Buldhana district in Vidarbha Region of Maharashtra state, India. It is located on the Pune-Nagpur highway. It is situated at the westernmost border of Vidarbha region of Maharashtra and is 500 km from the state capital, Mumbai. Chikhli is situated on the border of the Marathwada and Vidarbha of Maharashtra.

Chikhli has an MIDC located on Nagpur-Pune highway that houses many SMEs in automotive, chemical, fibres and plastic, iron casting and other sectors.

The headquarters town of the tahsil bearing the same name is situated at a distance of fourteen miles from Buldhana, the district headquarters. The old Gazetteer of Buldhana district has to say the following about this town: "There is a dargah or a tomb of Madan Shah Wali in whose honour an urus is held every year at which about 500 people assemble from the surrounding villages. The dargah has some inam land for its support. A temple of Shiva to the west of the town is of some archaeological importance. The top was rebuilt about 40 years ago, and other buildings have been added to it."

The municipal council was established at Chikhli in 1930 and administers an area of 14.29 square kilometres. The municipal council is composed of 17 members, two seats being reserved for women and one for scheduled tribes. The municipal administration is divided into various sections such as office, collection, octroi, sanitation, education and dispensary.

The total income of the municipality excluding extraordinary and debt heads amounted to Rs. 5,37,245.92 during the year 1965-66 [During: 1972-73 the income and expenditure amounted to Rs 9,02,000 and Rs. 9,48,000.] and was composed of municipal rates and taxes, Rs. 2,18,443.73; realisations under special Acts, Rs. 1,973.61; revenue derived from municipal property and powers apart from taxation, Rs. 7,986.00; grants and contributions for general and special purposes, Rs. 3,04,187.33 and income from miscellaneous sources Rs. 4,655.92. During the same year, the total expenditure of the municipality excluding extra-ordinary and debt heads came to Rs. 5,20,960.54. comprising general administration and collection charges, Rs. 1,32,788.89; public safety, Rs. 15,20,232: public health and convenience. Rs. 1,41,362.27; public instruction, Rs. 2,25,695.11; contributions, Rs. 200.00 and miscellaneous expenditure. Rs. 5,711.54. During the year under review the municipality had an income of Rs. 24,913.76 under extra-ordinary and debt heads and under the same head the expenditure was Rs. 36,803.83.

For the convenience of the public the municipality maintains a fruits and vegetables market as also fish and mutton markets. It also conducts a library. The municipality maintains two dispensaries, one general and one veterinary. Wells form the main source of water-supply to the town. Primary education has been made compulsory in the town and is managed by the municipality. Besides primary schools there are two colleges and four high schools in the town. The total length of roads maintained by the municipality is 7 km. of which a length of 2 km. is asphalted, of 1 km. metalled and the rest i.e., of 4 km. unmetalled. The municipality maintains four cremation grounds and five burial places. There is also a municipal garden and a meeting hall in the municipal office building.

Among the objects of interest in the town may be mentioned the maths of Udasi Maharaj and Mauni Maharaj, the Nazarene Mission Church and the temples of Shiva, Devi and Ganesha. A very big fair is held in honour of the Goddess Ranuka Devi on Chaitra full moon day (April). More than 20,000 people attend the same.

== Geography and climate ==
Chikhli has an average elevation of 606 metres (1988 feet). Chikhli has a moderate climate. The annual rainfall averages 800 mm. Most of the rainfall occurs in the monsoon season between June and September.

== Demographics ==
As of the As of 2011 India census, Chikhli had a population of 57,889. Males constituted 52% of the population, while females made up 48%. The city has an average literacy rate of 74%, higher than the national average of 59.5%; male literacy stands at 81%, and female literacy at 67%. About 13% of the population is under the age of six. Marathi is the main language of communication.

Population and Religion Data for Chikhli
Year	Male Population	Female Population	Total Population	Change	Hindu (%)	Muslim (%)	Christian (%)	Sikh (%)	Buddhist (%)	Jain (%)	Other (%)	Religion not stated (%)
2001	25,297	23,131	48,428	-	65.40	22.84	0.31	0.05	10.25	1.07	0.07	0.02
2011	29,977	27,912	57,889	19.5%	63.20	24.35	0.39	0.02	11.01	0.91	0.06	0.05

== Transport ==
The city is connected to other major cities of Maharashtra by State Highway 24 (Betul, Madhya Pradesh to Chandwad, Nashik and State Highway 176 (Malkapur to Solapur) and National Highway 753A (Buldhana to Shirdi). There is a state project to build a 4-lane highway between Chikhli and Malkapur, but has been postponed due to some problems in the Rajur Ghat near Buldana.

Chikhli is not connected to the Railway Network. The nearest Railway Stations are Malkapur 72 km (45 mi), Nandura 77 km (48 mi), and Jalna 90 km (56 mi). The nearest Railway Junctions are Akola 110 km (68 mi), and Chhatrapati Sambhajinagar 140 km (87 mi). However, in 2016 railway budget NDA government sanctioned and allotted Rs 3000 crores for Khamgaon -Jalna railway line. After completion of this project Chikhli will be a major railway station on Khamgaon-Jalna railway line. Chikhli-Burhanpur and Malkapur-Solapur railway lines have been proposed.

The nearest airport is at Aurangabad Airport formerly Aurangabad, 140 km (87 mi).

== Culture ==
The ancient historical temple of Renuka Devi is situated in the heart of city. The only one temple of Pandava is situated in the nearby village Kavhala.

There is a large celebration on Hanuman Jayanthi, where thousands of people join the rally and celebrate their faith towards Renuka Devi. There is Panchmukhi Mahadeo Temple on Khamgaon road near Vishwabhar mama Shelake Mala. Shri Siddha Science Temple near Gondhane Complex on Mehkar Phata Road, which is famous for lord Shiva and Siddha Science, which is scientific spirituality or yoga. There is Shriram mandir in the old city, Ram Navami is celebrated each year with pleasure by peoples. It has Jain Temple also near hanuman temple, which is 100 years old.

== Hemadpanti Architecture Mahadeo Temple Sakegaon ==
The Hemadpanthi Mahadeo Temple in Sakegaon is an ancient shrine dedicated to Lord Shiva, constructed in the Hemadpanthi style. Sakegaon located 10KM away from the main city, This architectural tradition, introduced by Hemadri Pandit in the 13th century under the Yadava dynasty, is known for its use of black stone without mortar or cement. The temple exemplifies the simplicity and durability of this technique, with intricately carved details adorning its walls and pillars.

Like other Hemadpanthi temples, the Mahadeo Temple serves as a center for religious activities and local festivals, particularly during Mahashivratri.

== Khairullah Shah Miyan Dargah ==
Khairullah Shah Miyan Dargah is a religious place located in Chikhli. Peoples from all over Maharashtra visit over there for "ziyarat" at the time of URS and Sandal. This Sandal is held exactly after three days of Holi festival.

== President of India visited the city ==
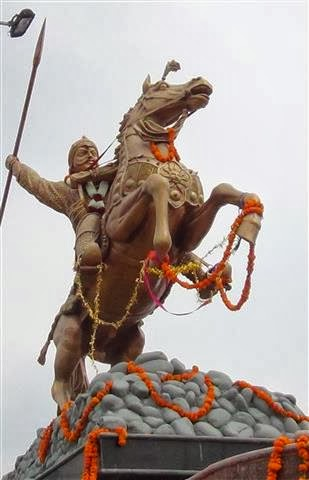
17 July 2009-Felicitated by President Smt.Pratibha Patil at Chikhali on inauguration of "Maharana Pratap" statue

17 July 2009 - Felicitated by President Smt. Pratibha Patil at Chikhali on inauguration of "Maharana Pratap" statue.
