= National Highway 353J (India) =

National highway in India

National Highway 353J
- Map of National Highway 353J in red

Route information
- Auxiliary route of NH 53
- Length: 172 km (107 mi)

Major junctions
- East end: Wadi, Nagpur
- West end: Paratwada

Location
- Country: India
- States: Maharashtra

Highway system
- Roads in India; Expressways; National; State; Asian
← NH 53	→ NH 548C

National Highway 353J, commonly referred to as NH 353J, is a National Highway up to Four-Lane Highway in India. It is a spur road of National Highway 53. NH-353J traverses the state of Maharashtra in India.

== Route ==
Fetri (Nagpur Outer Ring Road), Katol, Kalmeshwar, Jalalkheda, Warud, Morshi Chandur Bazar, Achalpur, Paratwada.

== Junctions ==
NH 53 Terminal near Fetri, Nagpur Outer Ring Road.
NH 548C Terminal near Paratwada.

== See also ==
- List of national highways in India
- List of national highways in India by state
