= Manpur, Indore =

Manpur raja Mansingh ki nagri
- Town
- Location in Madhya Pradesh, India Manpur (India)
- Coordinates: 22.43°N 75.62°E
- Country: India
- State: Madhya Pradesh
- District: Indore
- Founder: Raja Mansingh
- Elevation: 567 m (1,860 ft)

Population (2011)
  - Total: 9,200

Languages
  - Official: Hindi
- Time zone: UTC+5:30 (IST)
- ISO 3166 code: IN-MP
- Vehicle registration: MP

Manpur is a town and a nagar panchayat in Mhow Tehsil of Indore district in the Indian state of Madhya Pradesh.

== Geography ==
Manpur is located at 22.43°N 75.62°E. It has an average elevation of 567 metres (1860 feet).

== Demographics ==
As of 2001 India census, Manpur had a population of 10175. Males constitute 53% of the population and females 47%. Manpur has an average literacy rate of 66%, higher than the national average of 59.5%: male literacy is 74%, and female literacy is 56%. In Manpur, 15% of the population is under 6 years of age.places like vidhyavasini mandir, shitalamata fall and wanchoo point are famous for natural sightseeing.

== See also ==
- Jawahar Navodaya Vidyalaya, Indore
- Indore District
