= Kautha =

- Village
- Location in Karnataka, India
- Coordinates: 18.035377°N 77.475227°E
- Country: India
- State: Karnataka
- District: Bidar district
- Taluka: Aurad

Government
  - Type: Panchayat Raj
  - Body: Kautha Gram Panchayat

Area
  - Total: 7.8 km^{2} (3.0 sq mi)

Population (2011)
  - Total: 2,454
- PIN Code: 585421
- Telephone code: 08481
- Vehicle registration: KA-38

Kautha, also known as Koutha, is a village in Aurad taluka of Bidar district in the Indian state of Karnataka. As of the 2011 census, the village had a population of 2,454.

== Demographics ==
Demographic data of Kautha village (2011 Census)
Category	Total	Male	Female
Total Population	2,454	1,234	1,220
Children (0-6 years)	362	169	193
Scheduled Caste Population	643	326	317
Scheduled Tribe Population	684	345	339
Literacy Rate	69.69%	77.84%	61.25%
Workers			
Total Workers	1,052	660	392
Main Workers	893	—	—
Marginal Workers	159	53	106
Total Houses	440		

== Schools and Colleges ==
Educational Institutions in Kautha
Name	Type	Class	Location	Established	Management
Government Higher Primary School	Primary with Upper Primary	1st-7th	Kautha (585421)	1951	Government
Harlayya Comp PU College	Pre-University	PUC I-II	Kautha (585421)	1992	Private
Harlayya High School	Secondary	8th-10th	Kautha (585421)	1983	Government Aided
Sainath Gurukul Higher Primary School	Primary with Upper Primary	1st-7th	Kautha (585421)	2006	Private

== Bank ==
Banking Services in Kautha Village
Bank Name	Branch	IFSC Code	Services
Canara Bank	Kautha	CNRB0001930	Savings Accounts, Loans, Fixed Deposits
