= National Highway 752H (India) =

National highway in India

National Highway 752H
- Map of National Highway 752H in red

Route information
- Auxiliary route of NH 52
- Length: 202 km (126 mi)

Major junctions
- West end: Yevla
- East end: Deulgaon

Location
- Country: India
- States: Maharashtra

Highway system
- Roads in India; Expressways; National; State; Asian
← NH 752G	→ NH 753A

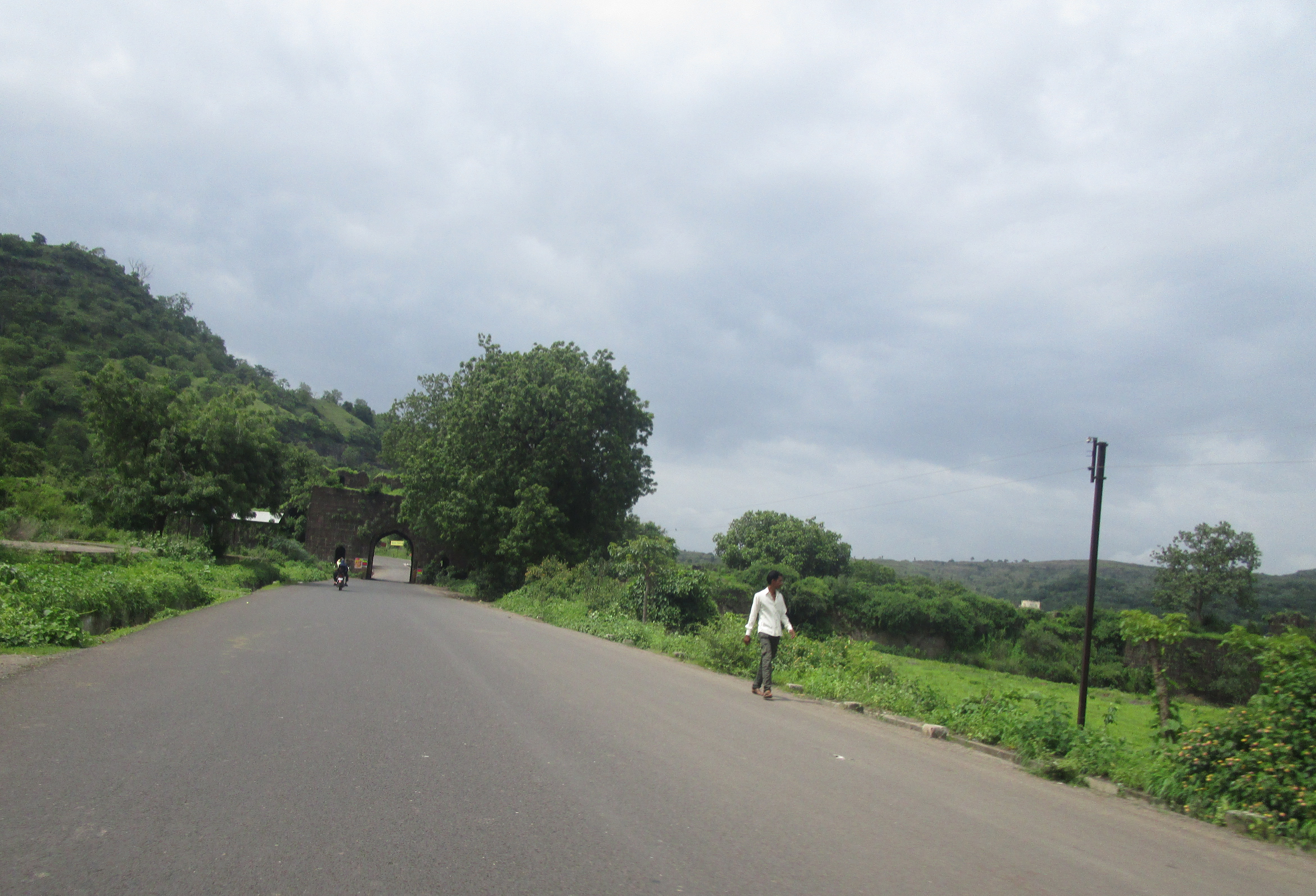
National Highway 752H near Daulatabad

National Highway 752H, commonly referred to as NH 752H is a national highway in India. It is a spur road of National Highway 52. NH-752H traverses the state of Maharashtra in India.

== Route ==
Yevla, Andarsul, Vaijapur Rotegaon, Shivur, DevgaonRanagari, Dewashi, Daultabad, Khultabad, Phulambri Dabhadi, Rajur, Deulgaon.

== Junctions ==
NH 752G Terminal near Yevla.
NH 753A Terminal near Deulgaon.

== See also ==
- List of national highways in India
- List of national highways in India by state
