= National Highway 561 (India) =

Highway in India

National Highway 561
- Map of National Highway 561 in red

Route information
- Auxiliary route of NH 61
- Length: 142 km (88 mi)

Major junctions
- West end: Ahmednagar
- East end: Beed

Location
- Country: India
- States: Maharashtra

Highway system
- Roads in India; Expressways; National; State; Asian
← NH 61	→ NH 52

National Highway 561, commonly referred to as NH 561, is a national highway in India. It is a spur road of National Highway 61. NH-561 traverses the state of Maharashtra in India.

== Route ==
Ahmednagar, Chinchodi-Patil, Kada, Ashti, Jamkhed, Sautadaa, Patoda fhata, Therla, Pitthi, Shirapur, Beed.

== Junctions ==
NH 61 Terminal near Ahmednagar.
NH 548D near Jamkhed.
NH 52 Terminal near Beed.

== See also ==
- List of national highways in India
- List of national highways in India by state
