= National Highway 161A (India) =

National highway in India

National Highway 161A
- Map of National Highway 161A in red

Route information
- Auxiliary route of NH 61
- Maintained by National Highways Authority of India
- Length: 507 km (315 mi)
- Existed: 2022–present

Major junctions
- North end: Akot, Maharashtra
- Akot, Akola, Barshitakli, Mangrulpir, Manora, Digras, Arni, Mahur, Kinwat, Himayatnagar, Mudkhed, Waghala, Mukhed,
- South end: Bidar, Karnataka

Location
- Country: India
- States: Maharashtra, Karnataka
- Major cities: Akot, Akola, Barshitakli, Mangrulpir, Manora, Digras, Arni, Mahur, Kinwat, Himayatnagar, Mudkhed, Waghala, Mukhed, Aurad, Bidar
- Primary destinations: Akot; Akola; Barshitakli; Mangrulpir; Manora; Digras; Arni; Mahur; Kinwat; Himayatnagar; Mudkhed; Waghala; Mukhed; Aurad; Boral; Jonnekeri; Kappekeri; Santhpur; Chatnal cross; Shembelli cross; Mustapur; Kaudagaoun; Ballur; Koutha; Janwada; Markhal; Chikpet; Bidar

Highway system
- Roads in India; Expressways; National; State; Asian
| ← NH 548C | → NH 63 |

National Highway 161A, commonly as NH 161A, is a National Highway running through states of Karnataka and Maharashtra, with a total length 507 Kilometres that connects Akot, Maharashtra to Bidar, Karnataka. National Highway 161A joins the cities of Akot, Akola, Barshitakli, Mangrulpir, Manora, Digras, Arni, Mahur, Kinwat, Himayatnagar, Mudkhed, Waghala, Mukhed, Maharashtra–Karnataka border in central southern India with each other. It is an auxiliary route of National Highway 61.

== Junctions ==
- At Akola with NH 6 connecting Hajira, Surat, Dhule, Akola, Amravati, Nagpur, Durg, Raipur, Mahasamund, Sambalpur, Baharagora, Kolkata
- At Akola with NH 161 connecting Akola, Washim, Hingoli, Nanded, Sangareddy, Hyderabad
- At Nanded with NH 222 connecting Kalyan, Ahmednagar, Pathardi, Parbhani, Basmat, Nanded, Nirmal
- At Nanded with NH 204 connecting Ratnagiri, Kolhapur, Sangli, Pandharpur, Solapur, Tuljapur, Latur, Nanded, Arni, Yavatmal, Wardha, Buti Bori, Nagpur

== States, districts, cities, towns and villages connected ==
The Maharashtra state.

1. Maharashtra State

- Akot
- Akola
- Barshitakli
- Mangrulpir
- Manora
- Digras
- Arni
- Mahur
- Kinwat
- Sawargaon Tanda
- Himayatnagar
- Mudkhed
- Waghala
- Mukhed

2. Karnataka State

- Aurad
- Boral
- Jonnekeri
- Kappekeri
- Santhpura
- Chatnal cross
- Shembelli cross
- Mustapur
- Kaudagaoun
- Ballur
- Koutha
- Janwada
- Markhal
- Chikpet
- Bidar

== See also ==
- List of national highways in India
