= National Highway 548C (India) =

National highway in India

National Highway 548C
- Map of National Highway 548C in red

Route information
- Auxiliary route of NH 48
- Length: 668 km (415 mi)

Major junctions
- South end: Satara
- List: NH 48; NH 65; NH 63; NH 52; NH 548D; NH 61; NH 752I; NH 548B; NH 753C; NH 53; NH 161G; NH 161A; NH 353J; NH 47
- North end: Baitul

Location
- Country: India
- States: Madhya Pradesh, Maharashtra

Highway system
- Roads in India; Expressways; National; State; Asian
← NH 48	→ NH 47

National Highway 548C, commonly referred to as NH 548C is a national highway in India. It is a spur road of National Highway 48. NH-548C traverses the states of Madhya Pradesh and Maharashtra in India.

== Route ==
Satara, Koregaon, Pusegaon, Mhaswad, Malshiras, Akluj, Tembhurni, Kurudwadi, Barshi, Kuslamb, Yermala, Kalamb, Kaij, Dharur, Majalgaon, Partur, Watur, Mantha, Lonar, Mehkar, Janephal, Khamgaon, Shegaon, Akot, Anjangaon, Wadgaon, Paratwada, Baitul.

== Junctions ==
NH 48 Terminal near Satara.
NH 65 near Tembhurni.
NH 63 near Kuslamb, Barshi.
NH 52 near Yermala.
NH 548D near Kaij.
NH 61 near Majalgaon.
NH 752I near Mantha.
NH 548B near Mantha.
NH 753C near Mehkar.
NH 53 near Khamgaon.
NH 161G near Shegaon.
NH 161A near Patsul.
NH 161A near Akot.
NH 353J near Paratwada.
NH 47 Terminal near Betul.

== See also ==
- List of national highways in India
- List of national highways in India by state
