= National Highway 53 (India) =

National highway in India

National Highway 53
- Map of National Highway 53 in red
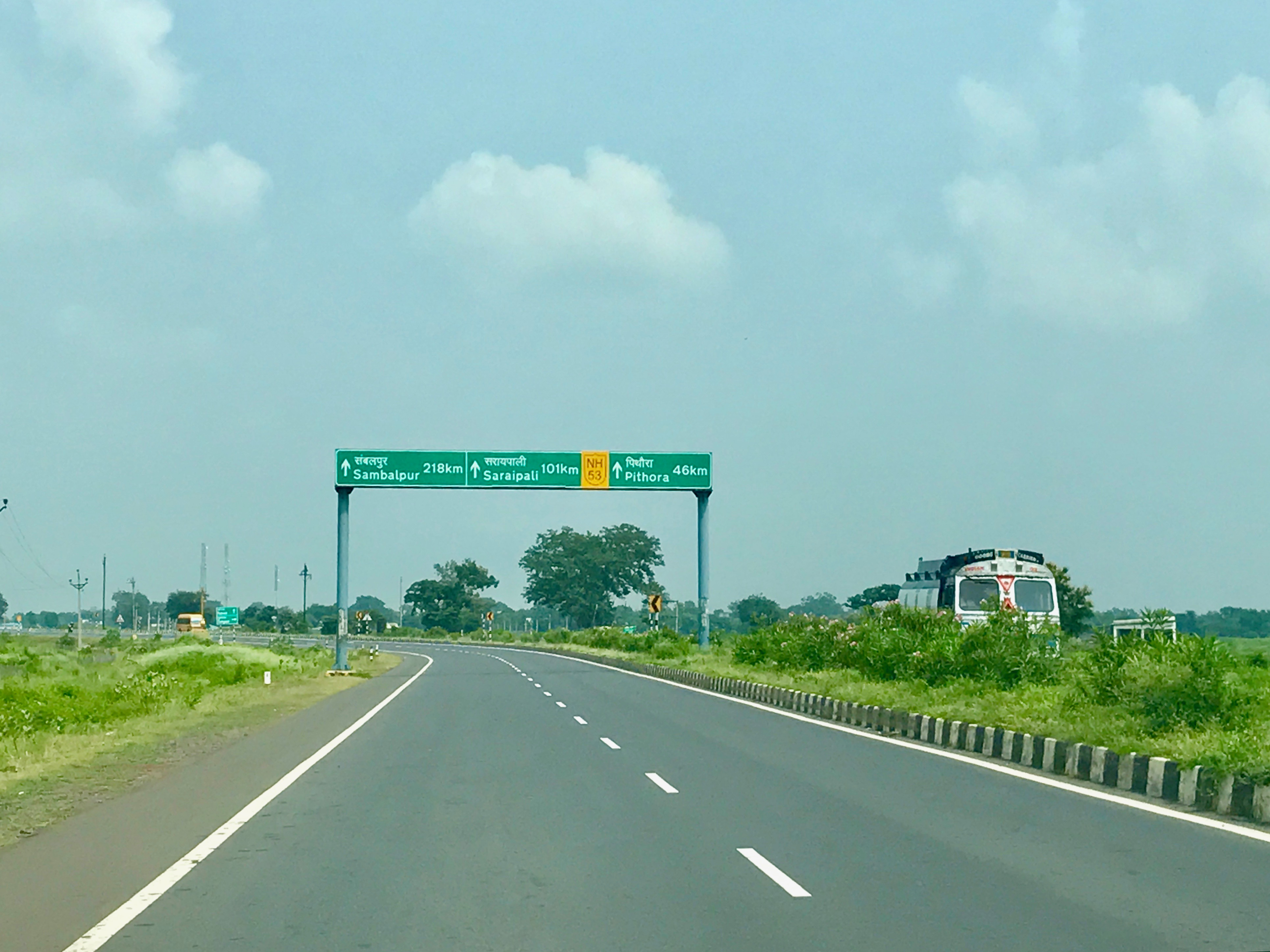
- NH 53 in Chhattisgarh

Route information
- Part of AH46
- Length: 1,849 km (1,149 mi) Bharatmala: 1,300 km (810 mi) (Dhule - Barkote)

Major junctions
- West end: Hajira
- East end: Paradeep Port

Location
- Country: India
- States: Gujarat, Maharashtra, Chhattisgarh, Odisha

Highway system
- Roads in India; Expressways; National; State; Asian
← NH 52	→ NH 54

Schematic map of National Highways in India

National Highway 53, (combination of old - NH6 Surat-Kolkata, NH200 Bilaspur-Chandikhole & NH5A Chandikhole-Paradeep) is a national highway in India.

It connects Hajira in Gujarat and Paradeep port in Odisha. NH-53 traverses the states of Gujarat, Maharashtra, Chhattisgarh and Odisha in India.

The road is the part of AH46 network in India and it is officially listed as running over 1975 km (1227 mi) from Kolkata to Surat. it is also known as Surat - Kolkata Highway. It passes through Maharashtra, Chhattisgarh and Odisha states.

The National Highway Authority of India (NHAI) has gained a Guinness World Record of constructing 75 kilometres of highway stretch between Amravati and Akola in the shortest time—105 hours and 33 minutes. The newly constructed road is part of National Highway 53.

== Route ==
Route of primary national highway 53 passes through four states of India.

=== Gujarat ===
Hajira, Surat, Vyara, Songadh, Uchchhal - Maharashtra border.

=== Maharashtra ===
Gujarat border Navapur, Dhule, Jalgaon bhusawal, Malkapur, Khamgaon, Akola, murtizapur, Amravati, Karanja(Wardha), Nagpur, Bhandara, Deori

=== Chhattisgarh ===
Maharashtra border - Rajnandgaon, Durg, Bhilai, Raipur, Arang, Ghorari, Pithora, Saraipali - Odisha border.

=== Odisha ===
Chhattisgarh border - Bargarh, Sambalpur, Tileibani, Deogarh, Barkote, Pallahara, Samal Barrage, Godibhanga, Talcher, Kamakhyanagar, Bhuban, Sukinda, Dubri, Chandhikhol, Haridaspur, Silipur, Bhutamundai, Paradip Port.

== Asian Highways ==
The stretch of National Highway 53 from Dhule in Maharashtra to Pallahara in Odisha is part of Asian Highway 46.

== Junctions list ==
Gujarat

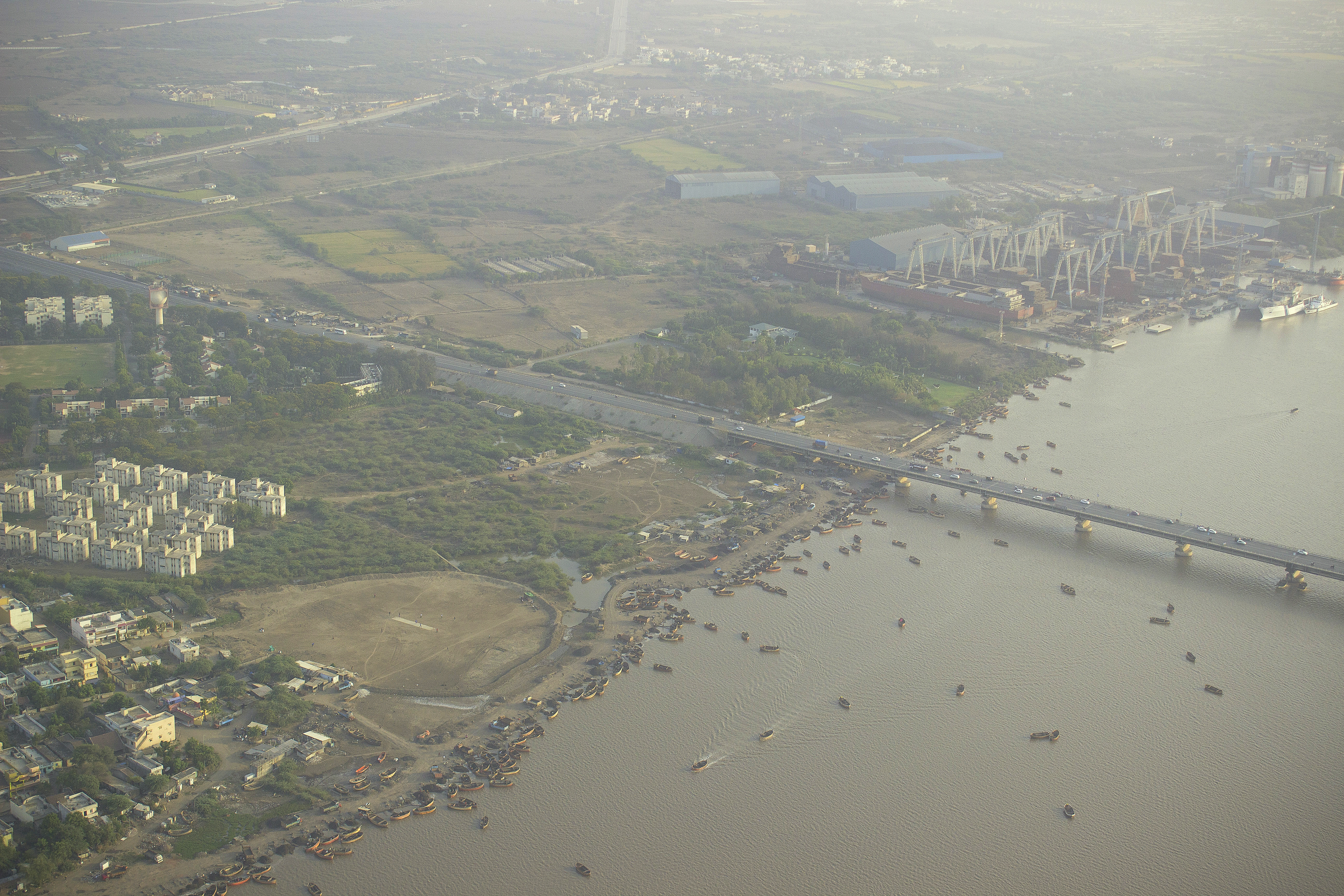
Aerial view of ONGC bridge across Tapi river, Gujarat

Terminal point at Hazira port.
NH 64 near surat
NH 48 near Palsana
NH 56 near Vyara
NH 953 near Songadh
Maharashtra

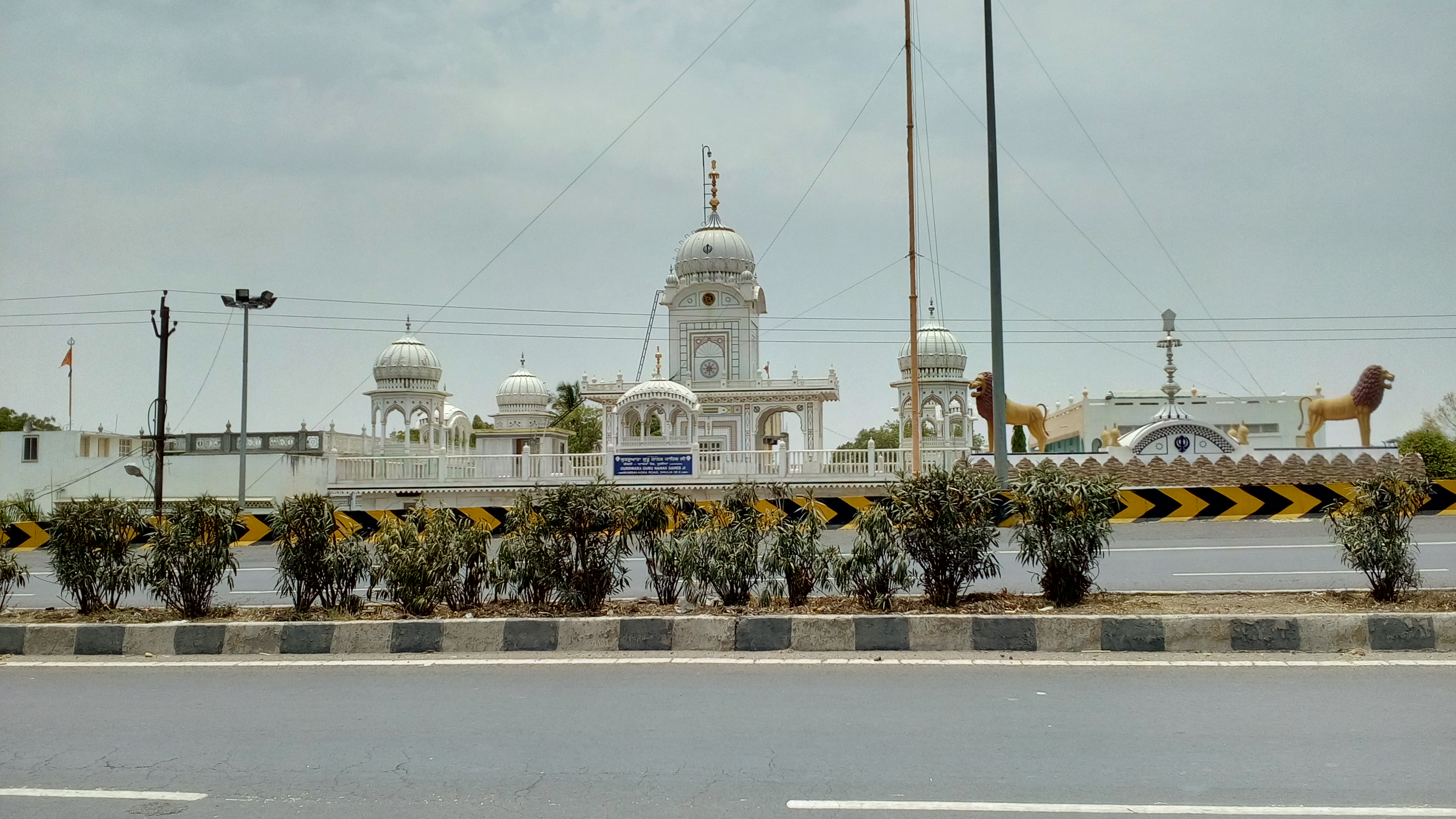
NH 53 at Dhule, Maharashtra

NH 752G near Visarwadi
NH 753B near Shewali
NH 160H near Kusumbe
NH 52 near Dhule
NH 60 near Dhule
NH 753J near Jalgaon
NH 753F near Jalgaon
NH 753L near Muktainagar
NH 753A near Malkapur
NH 161H near Nandura
NH 753E near Khamgaon
NH 548C near Khamgaon
NH 548CC near Khamgaon
NH 161G near Balapur
NH 161 near Akola
NH 161A near Akola
NH 361C near Murtizapur
NH 161E near Hiwra Budruk
NH 353K near Nandgaon Peth
NH 347A near Talegaon
NH 547E near Gondkheri
NH 353I near Nagpur
NH 353J near Nagpur
NH 353D near Nagpur
NH 44 near Nagpur
NH 247 near Gumthala
NH 247 near Bhandara
NH 353C near Sakoli
NH 753 near Kohmara
NH 543 near Deori
Chhattisgarh

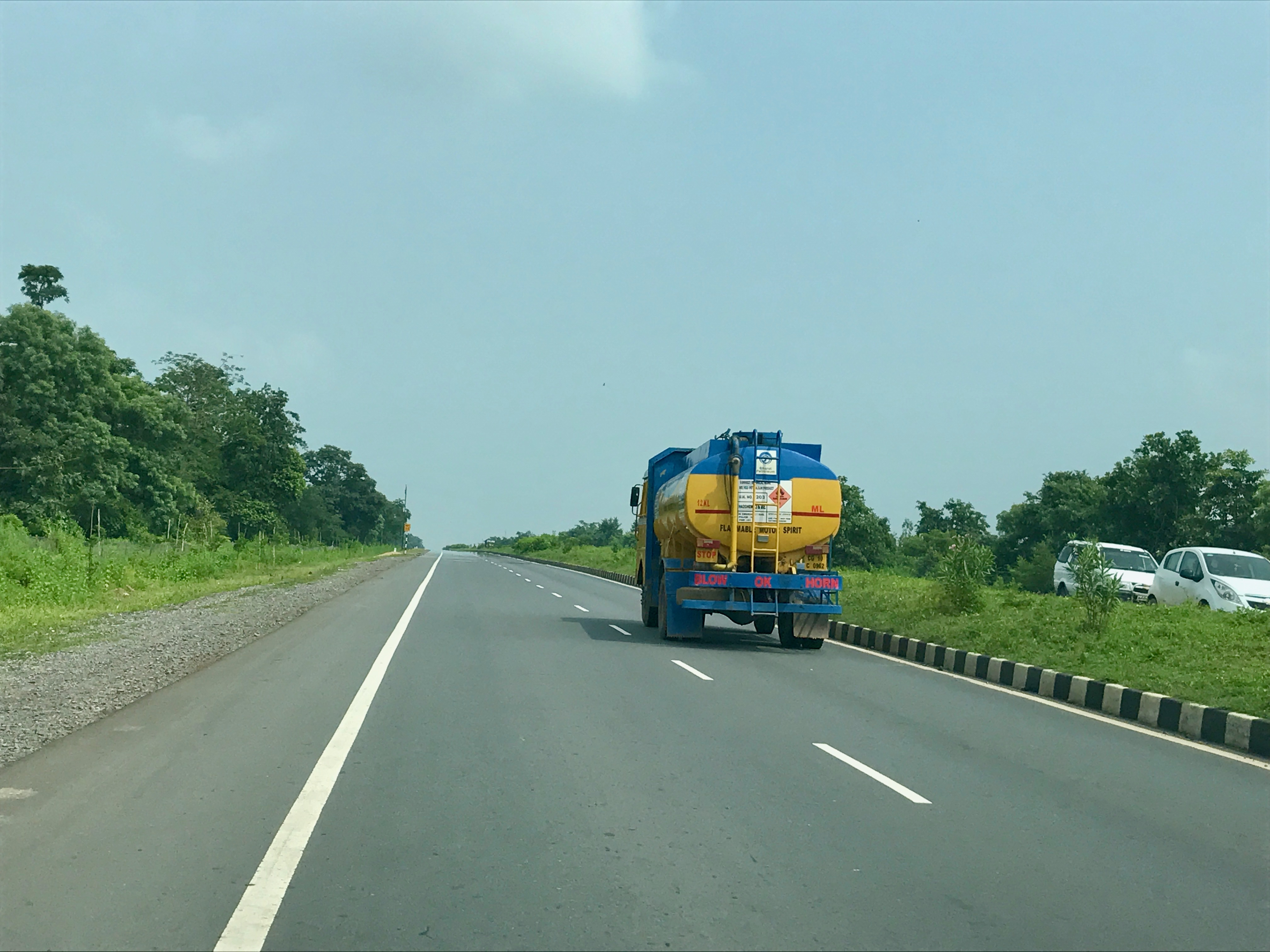
NH 53 in Chhattisgarh

NH 30 near Raipur
NH 353 near Ghorai Mahasamund
NH 153 near Saraipali
Odisha
NH 126 near Sohela
NH 26 near Bargarh
NH 55 near Sambalpur
NH 49 near Pravasuni
NH 153B near Sarapal
NH 149 near Deogarh
NH 720 near Duburi
NH 16 near Chandikhole
Terminal point at Paradip Port

== Map with spur routes ==
Map of NH53 in red, spur routes in blue

== See also ==
- List of national highways in India
- List of national highways in India by state
