= Himayatnagar, Maharashtra =

Himayatnagar
- City
- Himayatnagar
- Location in, India
- Coordinates: 19.422°N 77.865°E
- Country: Maharashtra India
- State: Maharashtra
- District: Nanded
- Established: In 1890

Government
  - Type: Municipal Council

Population (2022)
  - Total: 120,885

Languages
  - Official: Marathi Urdu हिंदी
- Time zone: UTC+5:30 (IST)
- PIN: 431802
- ISO 3166 code: IN-MH

Himayatnagar is a City and Tehsil Headquarter it is in Nanded district in Indian state of Maharashtra. Himayatnagar is an old and a religious city and it has very old historical background. It has Parmeshwar God temple which is very famous in area.

Himayatnagar is famous mainly because of a huge Islamic Organization here called Darul Uloom Muhammadiyah, It's an Islamic seminary and the largest Islamic University of Marathwada located there. In this Organization/School, which the locals like to call as Madrasah, many students memorize the Qur'an every year and also complete the course of Deeniyat (Islamic Teachings).

Himayatnagar is also known for a special relationship among the locals, whether it's Hindus or Muslims. Everybody lives in peace and harmony. There have been no reports of any religious conflict among people in history of Himayatnagar.
