= National Highway 347A (India) =

National highway in India

National Highway 347A
- Map of National Highway 347A in red

Route information
- Auxiliary route of NH 47
- Length: 262 km (163 mi)

Major junctions
- North end: Multai
- South end: Warora

Location
- Country: India
- States: Maharashtra, Madhya Pradesh

Highway system
- Roads in India; Expressways; National; State; Asian
← NH 47	→ NH 930

National Highway 347A, commonly referred to as NH 347A is a national highway in India. It is a spur road of National Highway 47. NH-347A traverses the states of Maharashtra and Madhya Pradesh in India.

== Route ==
Multai, Prabhat Pattan, Warud, Ashti, Arvi, Pulgaon, Wardha, Sevagram, Sonegaon, Hinganghat, Jamb, Warora.

== Junctions ==
NH 47 Terminal near Multai.
NH 930 Terminal near Warora.

== See also ==
- List of national highways in India
- List of national highways in India by state
