= National Highway 60 (India) =

National highway in India

National Highway 60
- Map of National Highway 60 in red
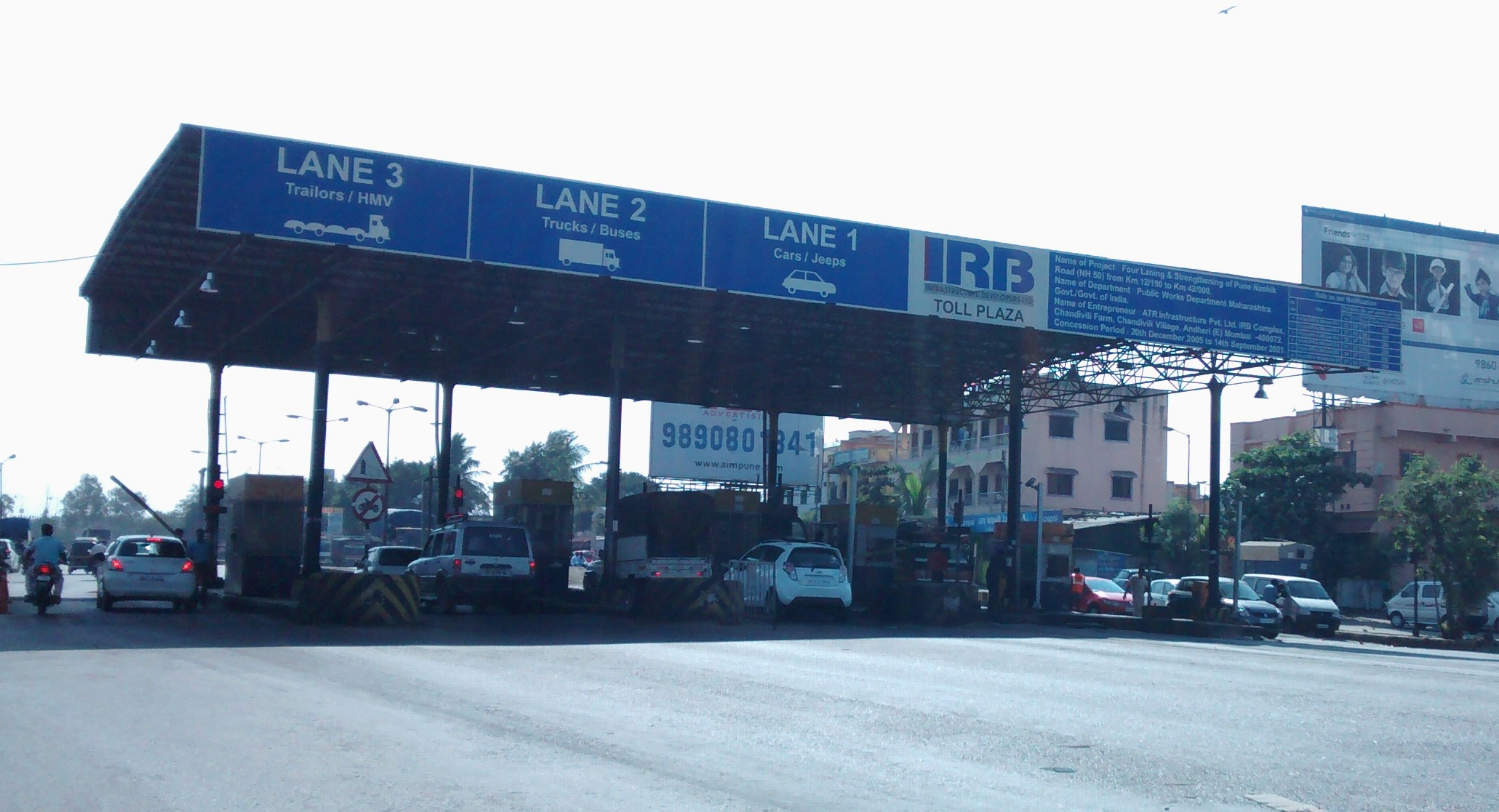
- Moshi Toll Plaza

Route information
- Part of AH47
- Length: 398.2 km (247.4 mi)

Major junctions
- North end: Thikari near Dhule
- South end: Katraj Near Pune

Location
- Country: India
- States: Maharashtra

Highway system
- Roads in India; Expressways; National; State; Asian
← NH 59	→ NH 61

Schematic map of National Highways in India

National Highway 60 (NH 60) is a primary national highway in India, connecting Pune and Dhule in the state of Maharashtra. Previously this route was numbered as NH 3 and NH 50. The total length of NH 60 is 398.2 km (247.4 mi). Dhule to Nashik stretch of this route is part of Asian Highway 47.

== Route ==
As per Google Map, NH60 starts from Thikari near Dhule the connects Arvi, Malegaon, Saundane, Chandwad, Ojhar, Nashik, Sinnar, Sangamner, Alephata, Bota, Pimpalwandi, Narayangaon, Peth, Khed, Chakan and Katraj near Pune in the state of Maharashtra.

== Junctions ==
NH 53 Terminal near Thikari at Dhule.
NH 52 at Thikari bypass near Dhule
NH 160H near Malegaon
NH 953 near Pimpalgaon Baswant
NH 160 near Nashik
NH 160A near Sinnar
NH 160D near Nandur Shingote
NH 61 near Alephata
NH 548D near Chakan
NH 65 near Nashik Phata
NH 48 Terminal near Katra, Pune.

== Asian Highways ==
Dhule to Nashik stretch of National Highway 60 is part of Kolkata - Mumbai Highway also known as Old NH-6, Bombay Road & Asian Highway 47.

== See also ==
- List of national highways in India
- List of national highways in India by state
