= National Highway 160 (India) =

National highway in India

National Highway 160
- Map of National Highway 160 in red

Route information
- Auxiliary route of NH 60
- Part of AH47
- Length: 680 km (420 mi)

Major junctions
- North end: Thane
- South end: Sankeshwar

Location
- Country: India
- States: Maharashtra, Karnataka

Highway system
- Roads in India; Expressways; National; State; Asian
← NH 60	→ NH 48

National Highway 160, commonly referred to as NH 160 is a national highway in India. It is a spur road of National Highway 60. NH-160 traverses the states of Maharashtra and Karnataka in India.

== Route ==
Maharashtra

Sinnar - Shirdi - Ahmednagar - Daund - Kurkumbh - Baramati - Phaltan - Dahiwadi - Mayani - Vita - Tasgaon - Miraj - Karnataka border.

Karnataka

Maharashtra border -Kagwad- Chikodi - Sankeshwar.

== Junctions ==
NH 60 Terminal Near Sinnar.

NH 160D near Kolhar.

NH 160C near Rahuri.

NH 61 near Ahmadnagar.

NH 65 near Kurkumbh.

NH 548C near Dahiwadi.

SH 143 near Mayani.

NH 166E near Vita.

NH 266 near Tasgaon.

NH 166 near Miraj

NH 166H near Miraj

NH 548B near Kagwad.

NH 48 Terminal near Sankeshwar - Gotur.

== See also ==
- Mumbai Nashik Expressway
- List of national highways in India
- List of national highways in India by state
