= National Highway 61 (India) =

National highway in India

National Highway 61
- Map of National Highway 61 in red
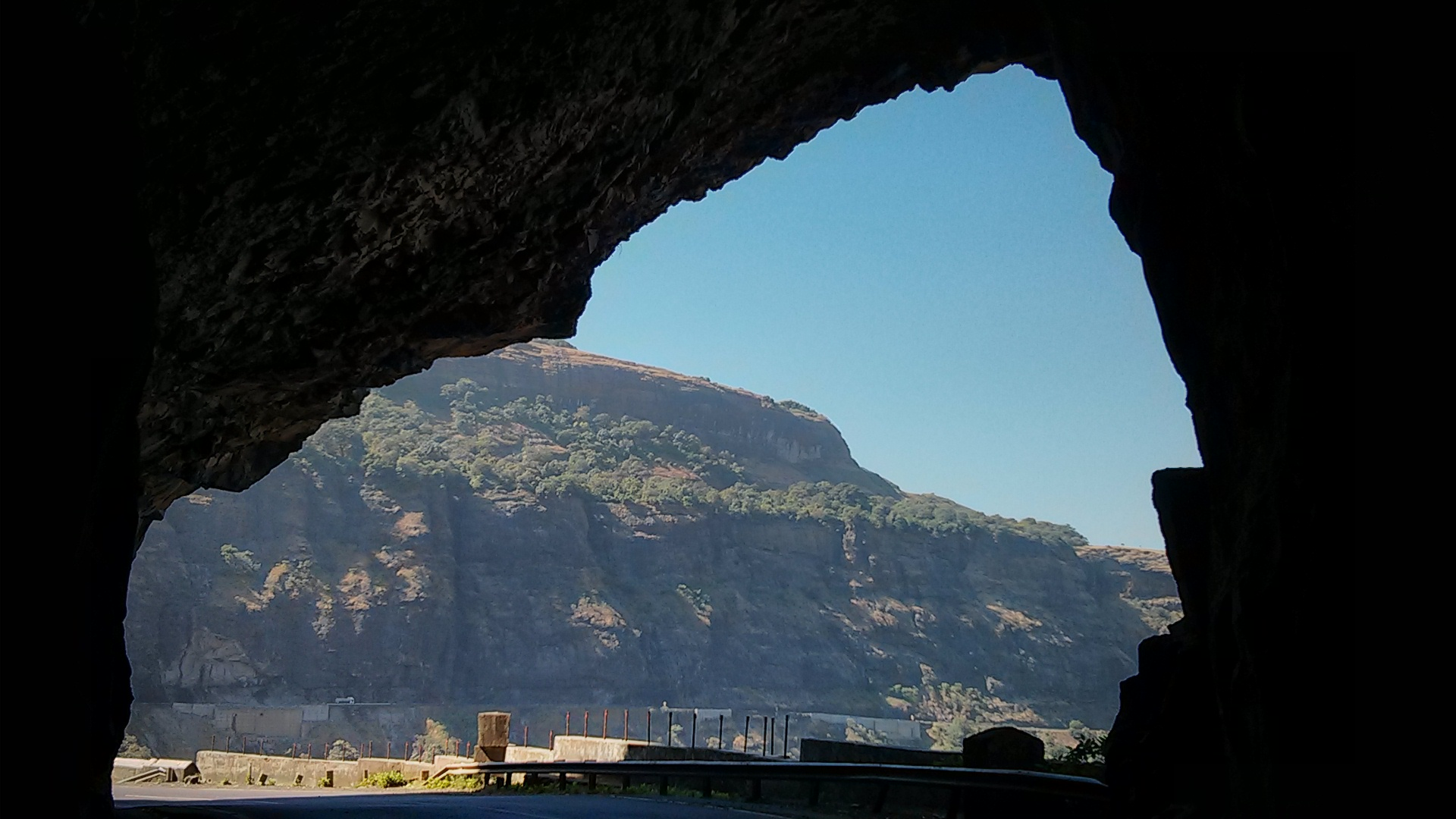
- NH 61 in scenic Malshej Ghat

Route information
- Length: 758 km (471 mi)

Major junctions
- West end: NH 160 in Bhiwandi
- List: NH 548A in Murbad; NH 60 in Aalephata; NH 761 in Belhe; NH 160 / NH 561 / NH 561A / NH 753F in Ahilyanagar; NH 361F in Kharwandi; NH 752E in Midangavi; NH 52 from Padalsingi to Gadhi; NH 548C in Majalgaon; NH 548B in Pathri; NH 752K in Parbhani; NH 161 / NH 361 in Nanded; NH 161A in Bhokar; NH 44 in Nirmal
- East end: NH 63 in Jagtial

Location
- Country: India
- States: Maharashtra: 610 km Telangana: 148 km
- Primary destinations: Kalyan-Ahmednagar-Parbhani-Nanded-Nirmal-Jagtial

Highway system
- Roads in India; Expressways; National; State; Asian
← NH 60	→ NH 62

National Highway 61 (NH 61) is a National Highway in India connecting Bhiwandi in Maharashtra to Nirmal in Telangana. The route of this national highway was extended from Nirmal to Jagtial in the state of Telangana. NH-61 runs through states of Maharashtra and Telangana covering a distance of 758 km.

== Route ==
Schematic map of National Highways in India

Maharashtra

Bhiwandi - Kalyan - Murbad - Ghatghar - Ale - Belhe -Ahmadnagar -Pathardi - Yeli - Kharwandi - Gevrai - Pachegaon - Majalgaon - Pathri - Parbhani - Basmath - Ardhapur - Bhokar - Telangana border.

Telangana

Maharashtra Border - Bhainsa - Nirmal - Khanapur - Mallapuram - Raikal - Jagtial.

== See also ==
- List of national highways in India
- List of national highways in India by state
