= National Highway 752G (India) =

National highway in India

National Highway 752G
- Map of National Highway 752G in red

Route information
- Auxiliary route of NH 52
- Length: 404 km (251 mi)

Major junctions
- North end: Sendwa
- South end: Shirdi

Location
- Country: India
- States: Maharashtra, Madhya Pradesh

Highway system
- Roads in India; Expressways; National; State; Asian
← NH 52	→ NH 160

National Highway 752G, commonly referred to as NH 752G is a national highway in India. It is a spur road of National Highway 52. NH-752G traverses the states of Madhya Pradesh and Maharashtra in India.

== Route ==
Sendwa, Khetia, Shahada, Prakasha, Nandurbar, Visarwadi, Sakri, Pimpalner, Satana, Deola, Chandvad, Manmad, Yeola, Kopargaon, Shirdi.

== Junctions ==
NH 52 Terminal near Sendwa.
NH 160 Terminal near Shirdi.

== See also ==
- List of national highways in India
- List of national highways in India by state
