= National Highway 161 (India) =

National highway in India

National Highway 161
- Map of the National Highway in red

Route information
- Length: 430 km (270 mi)

Major junctions
- North end: Akola
- South end: Sangareddy

Location
- Country: India
- States: Maharashtra, Telangana
- Primary destinations: Akola - Patur - Malegaon - Washim -Koulas -Hingoli - Nanded - biloli - Bichkunda - Pitlam-Jogipet - Sangareddy

Highway system
- Roads in India; Expressways; National; State; Asian
← NH 53	→ NH 65

Schematic map of National Highways in India

National Highway 161, (may be referred to as NH 161), is a National Highway in India running through the states of Maharashtra and Telangana of India. The National Highway 161 joins the cities of Akola, Washim, Hingoli, Nanded, Degloor, Bichkunda, Pitlam, Nizampet, Shankarampet(A), Jogipet, Andole, Sanga Reddy and Hyderabad in Central-Southern India with each other.

== Junctions ==
- At Akola with NH 6 connecting Hajira - Surat - Dhule - Akola - Amravati - Nagpur - Durg - Raipur - Mahasamund - Sambalpur - Baharagora - Kolkata
- At Akola with NH161A connecting Akot - Akola - Barshitakli - Mangrulpir - Digras - Arni - Mahur - Kinwat - Himayatnagar - Mudkhed - Nanded - Mukhed - Maharashtra-Karnataka border
- At Washim with NH 161E connecting Washim - Mangrulpir - Karanja - Hiwra Budruk on NH 6
- At Nanded with NH 222 connecting Kalyan - Ahmednagar - Pathardi - Parbhani - Basmat - Nanded - Nirmal
- At Nanded with NH 204 connecting Ratnagiri - Kolhapur - Sangli - Pandharpur - Solapur - Tuljapur - Latur - Nanded - Arni - Yavatmal - Wardha - Buti Bori - Nagpur
- At Sangareddy with NH 65 connecting Pune - Solapur - Omerga - Zaheerabad - Sangareddy - Secunderabad - Hyderabad - Suryapet - Vijayawada - Machilipatnam

== States, districts, cities, towns and villages connected ==
The Maharashtra and Telangana are the two states connected by the NH 161.

== Maharashtra ==
- Akola district
  - Akola - Kapshi - Patur
- Washim district
  - Malegaon - Washim
- Hingoli district
  - Hingoli - Kalamnuri
- Nanded district
  - Ardhapur - Nanded - Degloor

== Telangana ==
- Kamareddy district
  - Madnoor - Bichkunda - Jukkal -Pitlam
- Sangareddy district
  - Nizampet - Andole - Sangareddy
- Medak district
  - Shankarampet(A)
- List of national highways in India
- National Highway (India)

Jukkal X Road
