= National Highway 548D (India) =

National highway in India

National Highway 548D
- Map of National Highway 548D in red

Route information
- Auxiliary route of NH 48
- Length: 392 km (244 mi)

Major junctions
- West end: Talegaon Dabhade
- East end: Ahmedpur

Location
- Country: India
- States: Maharashtra

Highway system
- Roads in India; Expressways; National; State; Asian
← NH 48	→ NH 361

National Highway 548D, commonly referred to as NH 548D is a national highway in India. It is a spur road of National Highway 48. NH-548D traverses the state Maharashtra in India starting at the Talegaon Junction on NH-48, traveling through the historic town and urban hill station of Talegaon Dabhade. The National Highways Authority of India (NHAI) had approved a 60 Meters, Single Tier, Double floored Elevated Corridor on the 54 km stretch of NH 548 D starting at the junction of NH 48 to Talegaon Dabhade - Chakan - Shikrapur and then merging to the Pune - Shirur Elevated Corridor on NH 753 F, on a toll basis. However, the Government of Maharashtra requested NHAI & MORTH to accord NOC to the state for the development of this Elevated Corridor and MORTH has granted its No Objection Certificate to MSIDC (A Govt. of Maharashtra undertaking) to undertake and develop the project on the DPR approved by MORTH. The State Government on April 22, 2025 has approved a 4 lane Elevated Corridor along with 4 laning of existing single lane highway on Talegaon - Chakan route (Km 00.00 to 25.00) and a Six lane highway from Chakan to Shikrapur (Km 25.00 to 52.00).

== Route ==
Talegaon Dabhade, Chakan, Shikrapur, Nhavare, Kasthi, Srigonda, Jalgaon, Jamkhed, Patoda (Beed), Manjarsumba, Kaij, Ambajogai, Ghatnandur, Kingaon, Kopra, Patoda (Ahmedpur), Kajal Hipparga Ahmedpur.

== Junctions ==
NH 48 Terminal near Talegaon Dabhade.
NH 361 Terminal near Ahmedpur.

== See also ==
- List of national highways in India
- List of national highways in India by state
