= Amritsar–Jamnagar Expressway =

Indian expressway connecting Amritsar and Jamnagar

- Amritsar–Jamnagar Expressway (Rajasthan Section) in red

Route information
- Maintained by National Highways Authority of India (NHAI)
- Length: 1,256.95 km (781.03 mi)
- Existed: 8 July 2023 (Hanumangarh–Jalore section); December 2025 (full completion)–present

Major junctions
- North end: Tibba, Kapurthala, Punjab
- South end: Jamnagar, Gujarat

Location
- Country: India
- States: Punjab, Haryana, Rajasthan and Gujarat
- Major cities: Amritsar, Goindwal Sahib, Sultanpur Lodhi, Moga, Bathinda, Mandi Dabwali, Hanumangarh, Suratgarh, Bikaner, Nagaur, Jodhpur, Barmer and Jamnagar

Highway system
- Roads in India; Expressways; National; State; Asian

Amritsar Jamnagar Economic Corridor, nearly 1,400 km long, 6-lane wide corridor including the upgraded existing 215 km long NH54, the 915.85 km long greenfield Amritsar–Jamnagar Expressway (EC3) NH754A, and the upgraded existing 245 km long Santalpur-Jamnagar NH27 and NH151A national highway, will reduce the travel time between Amritsar and Jamnagar from earlier 26 hours to only 13 hours while passing through four states of Punjab, Haryana, Rajasthan and Gujarat. Built under the Bharatmala project, the route is strategically important, as it will connect 3 big oil refineries (HMEL Bathinda, the HPCL Barmer and the RIL Jamnagar); 2 power plants (Guru Nanak Dev Thermal Plant at Bathinda and Suratgarh Super Thermal Power Plant at Sri Ganganagar); 7 seaports (one major international port at Kandla Port and 6 intermediate ports at Mandvi, Navlakhi, Bedi, Sikka, Jodia, and Okha); 8 airports (Amritsar, Bathinda, Sirsa AFS, Bikaner, Bhuj, Kandla, Mundra, and Jamnagar); and defence airbases.

The expressway will meet the Ludhiana-Bathinda-Ajmer Expressway of the Pathankot–Ajmer Economic Corridor at Bathinda.

== History ==
This expressway is a part of Bharatmala's Phase-I, which is funded by the National Investment and Infrastructure Fund (NIIF) in phases.

In October 2018, the Detailed Project Report (DPR) was completed. In October 2019, bids were invited for various phases of the expressway, and land acquisition starts in October 2020 for the Amritsar–Bathinda greenfield stretch of the expressway, and the construction work began in April 2021.

The NHAI awarded the construction work of the greenfield expressway in 30 packages (stretches) to the following construction companies, CDS Infra Projects, Dineshchandra R. Agrawal Infracon (DRA), Gawar Construction, GR Infraprojects, JiangXi Construction – MKC Infrastructure JV, Krishna Construction, Lakshmi Infrastructure & Developers, NG Projects, NKC Projects, Raj Shyama Constructions, Raj Shyama Constructions - RCC Developers JV, Ravi Infrabuild Projects, VRC - VCL - CIL JV, VRC Constructions - S&P Infrastructure Developers JV.

== Route ==
The expressway will be the first expressway in India, connecting three oil refineries of Bathinda, Barmer and Jamnagar. The Barmer Refinery is set to be completed by March 2023. Nearly 50% of the length of the expressway, i.e., 637 km, falls under Rajasthan. The total project value including the land acquisition cost is nearly ₹80,000 crores.

=== Route summary by state ===
==== Punjab ====
In Punjab, it will start at Tibba village in Kapurthala district on Delhi–Amritsar–Katra Expressway (NE-5A), and will end near Punjab-Haryana border in Bathinda district on NH-54. The expressway on the Tibba–Moga–Bathinda stretch was re-planned by the NHAI to make it a greenfield expressway.

- Amritsar to Tibba NE-5A
- Tibba on NE-5A.
- NH-703 Moga to Jalandhar Road, intersects near Dharmkot.
- Bhata Bhai ka to Bhadaur Road, intersects near Dyalpura Bhai Ka.
- Rampura Phul, intersects Ludhiana-Bhatinda Expressway section of Pathankot–Ajmer Expressway.
- NH-54 Mandi Dabwali to Bathinda Road, intersects near Sangat Kalan.

==== Haryana ====
In Haryana, it will run entirely in the Sirsa district and it will not be access controlled. It will enter at Mandi Dabwali and exit at Haryana/Rajasthan border at Chautala village.

- Sirsa district
  - Dabwali
    - Pathrala, east of Dabwali, on NH54 Dabwali-Bhatinda highway.
    - South of Dabwali on NH9 Dabwali-Sirsa-Hisar-Delhi highway.
    - Southwest of Dabwali near Alika on SH34 Dabwali-Ellenabad highway.
  - Sakta Khera
  - Chautala on Chautala- Sangaria road
  - Dabwali–Panipat Expressway near Chautala

==== Rajasthan ====
In Rajasthan, it will enter through the Sangaria town in Hanumangarh district. From there it will pass through Bikaner district, Jodhpur district and Barmer district, before exiting Rajasthan at Sanchore town in Jalore district.

- Hanumangarh district.
  - 10 SBN near Sangaria town.
  - Interchange near Hanumangarh city at Kolha on south side on SH36.
  - Interchange at 28 NDR on Pilibanga–Rawatsar road near Chhohilawali.
  - Interchange at Kalusar–Eta Road near Kalusar in east of Suratgarh Super Thermal Power Plant.
  - Interchange: Jaitpur toll plaza on MDR34 between Arjansar–Pallu.
- Bikaner district
  - between Lunkaransar–Kalu on SH6A.
  - Sahajarasar between Dhireran and Kalu.
  - Norangdesar on NH11 Bikaner–Dungargarh–Ratangarh–Jhunjhunu–Chirawa–Loharu–Charkhi Dadri–Delhi highway.
  - Desnok-Rasisar on NH62 Bikaner–Nokha-Nagaur highway.
- Jodhpur district
  - Sri Lachhamannag on SH19 Phalodi-Nagaur highway.
  - Bhikamkor–Osian on SH61 on Phalodi-Osian highway.
- Barmer district
  - Dhandhaniya–Agolai
  - Patau on NH25 Pachpadra–Jodhpur highway.
- Jalore district
  - Pachpadra
  - Balotra
    - on SH61 Balotra–Samdari–Jodhpur highway.
    - NH325 Balotra–Siwana–Jalore highway.
  - Padroo
  - Dahiva
  - Bagoda
  - Sanchore

==== Gujarat ====
In Gujarat, it will enter at Vantdau in Banaskantha district, run through Patan district. From there the existing National Highway Network takes the route to Kutch district and Morbi district before finally ending at Jamnagar district.

- Banaskantha district
  - Tharad
  - Vasarda on NH68
  - Uchosan SH861
  - Jamvada SH127
- Patan district
  - Santalpur on NH27

=== Route summary by sections ===
The construction work of the expressway has been divided into 8 sections (5 greenfield alignment and 3 brownfield upgrades). With a total of 30 construction packages each with a construction period of 2 years. The projects is expected to be completed by September 2023.

Sr No	Section	Length in km	No. of packages	States	Lanes	Access controlled	Greenfield	Comments
1.	Tibba (Kapurthala)–Sangat Kalan (Bathinda)	155	3	Punjab	6	Yes	Yes	This section is also called the "Amritsar–Bathinda Expressway". Initial plan of 196 km brownfield upgrade of NH-54 was changed to greenfield project in 2020.
2.	Sangat Kalan (Bathinda)–Chautala (Sirsa)	85	-	Punjab & Haryana	6	No	No	Existing 2-lane NH-54 will be upgraded to 6-lane.
3.	Sangaria (Hanumangarh)–Rasisar (Bikaner)	252	9	Rajasthan	6	Yes	Yes	Sangaria (NH-54 - Tibbi - Rawatsar (SH-36) - Bijarasar (southeast of Pallu on SH-7) - Kalu (SH-64 - Bikaner (Saruna on NH-11 and Rasisar on Sangaria) (NH-64)
4.	Rasisar (Bikaner)–Deogarh (Jodhpur)	176	6	Rajasthan	6	Yes	Yes	Panchu (between Phalodi-Nokha) - Chadi (on SH-19 between Phaloudi-Nagaur) - Osian (SH-61 between Phalodi-Jodhpur) - Jodhpur (Deogarh on NH-125
5.	Deogarh (Jodhpur)–Sanchore (Jalore)	209	8	Rajasthan	6	Yes	Yes	Deogarh - Kalyanpur (on NH-25 between Pachpadra-Jodhpur) - Samdari (on SH-68 between Balotra-Jodhpur) - Siwana (on NH-325 between Balotra-Jalore) - Mohni Khera (on SH-16 between Barmer-Jalore) - Sanchore (SH-11 and NH-168A)
6.	Vantdau (Banaskantha)–Santalpur (Patan)	125	4	Gujarat	6	Yes	Yes	Vantdau (on NH-168) - Uchpa (SH128) - Vav (NH-68) - Suigam (SH-861) - Dudosan (SH-127) - Santalpur (NH-27 between Radhanpur and Adesar)
7.	Santalpur (Patan)–Malia (Morbi)	124	-	Gujarat	4	No	No	Minor upgrades to the existing 4-lane NH-27 from Santalpur-Samakhiali-Malia.
8.	Malia (Morbi)–Jamnagar	131	-	Gujarat	4	No	No	Minor upgrades to the existing 4-lane NH-947.
	Total	1,257	30	4 States	6-lanes, 4-lanes	5-Yes, 3-No	5-Yes, 3-No	

== Inter-connectivity ==
Amritsar-Jamnagar Corridor also connects to the Delhi–Amritsar–Katra Expressway via Ludhiana-Bhathinda spur and Amritsar Ring Road. As related but separate projects, from Samakhiali the existing highways Samakhiali-Bhachau-Bhimasar-Gandhidham-Mundra, Bhachau-Bhuj, Bhimasar-Anjar-Ratnal-Bhuj will also be upgraded to provide connectivity to other ports and cities.

== Status updates ==
- 2022 May: Out of the 155-km long NH54 from Amritsar to Bathinda, work was going on in an advanced stage, and the 762-km stretch from Sangaria in Rajasthan to Santalpur in Gujarat, out of which 400 km was completed, while the remaining portion was under construction.
- 2023 Jul: The construction work on the EC3 expressway started in Haryana and Rajasthan in 2019. The Rajasthan section of the expressway from Jakhrawali in Hanumangarh district to Khetlawas in Jalore district was completed in early 2023 and was inaugurated on 8 July 2023, while the entire expressway is expected to be opened by December 2025.

== See also ==
- List of highways in Haryana
- Expressways in Punjab
- Expressways of India
- Delhi–Mumbai Expressway
