= National Highway 911A (India) =

National highway in India

National Highway 911A
- National Highway 911A highlighted in red

Route information
- Auxiliary route of NH 11
- Length: 31 km (19 mi)

Major junctions
- South end: Pugal
- North end: Khajuwala

Location
- Country: India
- States: Rajasthan

Highway system
- Roads in India; Expressways; National; State; Asian
← NH 11	→ NH 62

National Highway 911A (NH 911A) is a highway in India. It runs from Pugal to Khajuwala, connecting the Major District Road 103 in Rajasthan to NH 911.

== See also ==
- List of national highways in India
- National Highways Development Project
