= National Highway 925A (India) =

National Highway in India

National Highway 925A
- Map of National Highway 925A in red

Route information
- Auxiliary route of NH 25
- Length: 63.1 km (39.2 mi)

Major junctions
- West end: Satta
- East end: Gandhav

Location
- Country: India
- States: Rajasthan

Highway system
- Roads in India; Expressways; National; State; Asian
← NH 925	→ NH 68

National Highway 925A, commonly referred to as NH 925A is a national highway in India. It is a spur road of National Highway 25. NH-925A runs in the state of Rajasthan in India.

== Route ==
NH925A connects Satta and Gandhav in the state of Rajasthan.

== Junctions ==
NH 925 Terminal near Satta.
NH 68 Terminal near Ghandav.

== See also ==
- List of national highways in India
- List of national highways in India by state
