= Bhawandesar =

- Village
- Location within Rajasthan Location within India
- Coordinates: 28°01′10″N 74°31′00″E
- Country: India
- State: Rajasthan
- District: Churu
- Taluka: Ratangarh

Government
  - Type: Sarpanch
  - Body: Gram panchayat

Languages
  - Official Language: Hindi
- Time zone: UTC+5:30 (IST)

Bhawandesar (also known as Bhavandesar or Bhavan Desar) is a village and Gram Panchayat in Churu district, Rajasthan, India, located between the municipalities of Ratangarh and Rajaldesar on a road opposite to National Highway 11. It falls under Ratangarh (Rajasthan) assembly constituency of Churu Lok sabha.
