= Bhaisawata Kalan =

Village in Rajasthan, India

Coordinates: 28.139°N 75.761°E

Bhaisawata Kalan also known by its local as 'Basawata Kalan' is a village in Buhana tehsil in Jhunjhunu district of Rajasthan State, India. It belongs to Jaipur division. It is located 0–45 km towards East from District headquarters Jhunjhunu. 10 km from Buhana. 186 km from State capital Jaipur and 191 km from Delhi..

Most of the population of this village belongs to Naruka Rajputs sub-clan (Dasawat) whose forefathers are responsible for the foundation of this village ages ago which is another territorial extension of Naruka's of Kachwaha Dynasty. Other castes are also present in this village such as Brahmin, Jats, Harijans, etc. According to Census 2011 information the location code or village code of Bhaisawata Kalan village is 071383. As per 2009 stats, Bhainsawat Khurd is the gram panchayat of Bhaisawata Kalan village.

The total geographical area of the village is 505.88 hectares. Bhaisawata Kalan has a total population of 1,881 peoples. There are about 350 houses in Bhaisawata Kalan village. Khetri is the nearest town to Bhaisawata Kalan which is approximately 20 km away.

Pin code is 333516 and postal head office is Singhana. It has a primary school, government hospital a huge playground and other amusement resources. This village is widely known for Baba Bhomiya Ji Temple and a grand fair at this place which is held in after 15 days of the Holi festival. The complete fair is managed by youths.

Moreover, Karni Mata Temple has also been built here on the mountain by Rajputs where several people have contributed their effort and money. This fair has a significant status in the villagers and neighboring villages. Bhaisawata Kalan is now progressing rapidly it is well connected by road-highway. Most of the younger generation of this village are serving their country as doctors, lawyers, navy, army, airforce, banking, Multi-National Companies equally in Government as well as in Private Sector. There is a 100% literacy rate in the village.
