= NH 25 =

NH 25 may refer to:

- National Highway 25 (India)
- New Hampshire Route 25, United States
