= National Highway 11 (India) =

National Highway in India

National Highway 11
- Map of the National Highway in red

Route information
- Length: 848 km (527 mi)

Major junctions
- West end: NH 70 in Myailar, Rajasthan
- List: NH 68 in Jaisalmer, Rajasthan; NH 125 in Pokaran, Rajasthan; NH 911 in Bap, Rajasthan; NH 62 in Bikaner, Rajasthan; NH 754K in Norang Desar, Rajasthan; NH 52 / NH 58 in Fatehpur, Rajasthan; NH 311 in Singhana, Rajasthan; NH 148B in Narnaul, Haryana
- East end: NH 352 / NH 919 in Rewari, Haryana

Location
- Country: India
- States: Rajasthan, Haryana: 848 km (527 mi)
- Primary destinations: Jaisalmer, Pokaran, Phalodi, Bikaner, Sri Dungargarh, Rajaldesar, Ratangarh, Fatehpur, Mandawa, Jhunjhunu, Bagar, Chirawa, Singhana, Narnaul, Rewari

Highway system
- Roads in India; Expressways; National; State; Asian
← NH 10	→ NH 12

National Highway 11 or NH 11 is a National Highway in India that links Jaisalmer (Rajasthan) and Rewari (Haryana). This 848 km-long highway passes through Myajlar, Pithala, Jaisalmer, Pokaran, Ramdevara, Phalodi, Bap, Diyatra Gajner, Bikaner, Sri Dungargarh, Rajaldesar, Ratangarh, Rolsabsar, Fatehpur, Tajsar, Mandawa, Jhunjhunu, Bagar, Chirawa, Singhana, Pacheri, Goad and Balaha Kalan villages in Mahendragarh district, Narnaul, Ateli, DFC New Rewari Railway Junction and Rewari. AIIMS Rewari also situated on this Highway.

Most of 760 km length of National Highway 11 is starting or junction point near National Highway 70 (Munabao -Tanot Highway) Mayajlar District Jaisalmer in the state of Rajasthan and the remaining length and starting point or junction with National Highway 352 (Narwana-Jhajjar-Rewari) in Rewari district in the state of Haryana. It is the shortest route between Delhi and Bikaner and reduces travelling time between Delhi and Bikaner.

== Route ==
Rewari, Pali, Kund Kathuwas, Ateli, Bachhod, Narnaul, Raghunathpura, Goad Balawa, Pacheri, Dumoli Khurd, Singhana, Bhaisawata Kalan, Adooka, Chirawa, Ojtu, Bkhatawarpura, Bagar, Jhunjhunu, Nayasar, Abusar, Durana, Hetamsar, Wahidpura, Tetra, Mandawa, Sadinsar, Balod Bari, Tajsar, Daultabad, Fatehpur, Shekhawati, Hardyalpura, Kalyanpura, Rolsabsar, Biramsar, Ratangarh, Rajaldesar, Kitasar, Shri Dungargarh, Jodhasar, Seruna, Gusainsar, Norangdesar, Raisar, Kanasar, Bikaner, Gajner, Madh, Diyatra Nokhra, Kanji ki sid, Gadna, Bap, Hindal Gol, Jor, Malhar, Phalodi, Ramdevara, Gomat, Pokhran, Khetolai, Lathi, Chandan, Sagra, Thaiyat, Jaisalmer War Museum, Jaisalmer, Pithala, Ghotru Rai Temple, Dhobha, Phuliya, Myajlar.

== Rewari bypass ==
To create connectivity between NH 11 and NH 48 (Delhi-Jaipur national highway), a new stretch of 4-lane 45 m wide NH 11 has been constructed and opened in early 2024 bypassing Rewari city and ending at NH 352 (Rohtak-Jhajjar-Rewari national highway) and now this is the terminus or starting point of NH 11. From there, NH 352 joins NH 48 after less than a km. The new alignment of NH 11 between NH 48 and Narnaul bypasses south of Rewari city and meets the existing Rewari-Narnaul road near Khori railway station. Thus vehicles going from Narnaul beyond Rewari (say, towards Delhi) do not have to enter Rewari city.

== National Highway 11 (old number) ==
Earlier, the old route of NH 11 started from Rajasthan-Uttar Pradesh border and went through Bharatpur, Mahwa, Dausa, Jaipur and Ringas to Sikar and then further to Fatehpur, Ratangarh, Dungargarh and terminated at Bikaner on old NH 15. It was 531 km long. It connected popular tourist destinations Jaipur and Agra via the UNESCO World Heritage Site of Keoladeo National Park in Bharatpur.

The new route starts from NH 352 in Rewari district and goes through Narnaul, Chirawa and Jhunjhunu to meet the old NH 11 at Fatehpur. From Bikaner it continues to Jaisalmer.

== Road construction ==
NH 11 is being upgraded from Fatehpur to Rewari.

Serial No	Chainage	Length (in km)	NHDP Phase Category	Concessionaire	Funded By	State
1	Jhunjhunu - Fatehpur	49.00 km	NHDP Phase	Tomar Construction Company New Delhi	Annuity	Rajasthan

This road also good news for Mandawa It is part of NH 11. This is Junction point on National Highway 352(Narwana-Jind-Rohtak-Rewari-Bawal) in Rewari in state of Haryana and other Junction point on NH 70(Munabao-Myajlar-Tanot) Myajlar in District Jaisalmer in the state of Rajasthan. The First Phase upgraded between Fatehpur to Jhunjhunu via Mandawa (0.00 to 49.00k.m.) by Tomar Construction Company New Delhi in the supervision of NHAI Office Churu. This NH 11 provides better connectivity between major cities Delhi, Rewari, Ateli, Narnaul, Singhana, Chirawa, Bagar, Jhunjhunu, Mandawa, Fatehpur, Rolsabsar Ratangarh, Rajaldesar, Dungargarh, Bikaner, Phalodi, Ramdevara, Pokharan, Jaisalmer, Myajlar. It also promotes Trade Tourism Commercials activity and also provide opportunities of employment in the state of Haryana and Rajasthan.

== Photo gallery ==
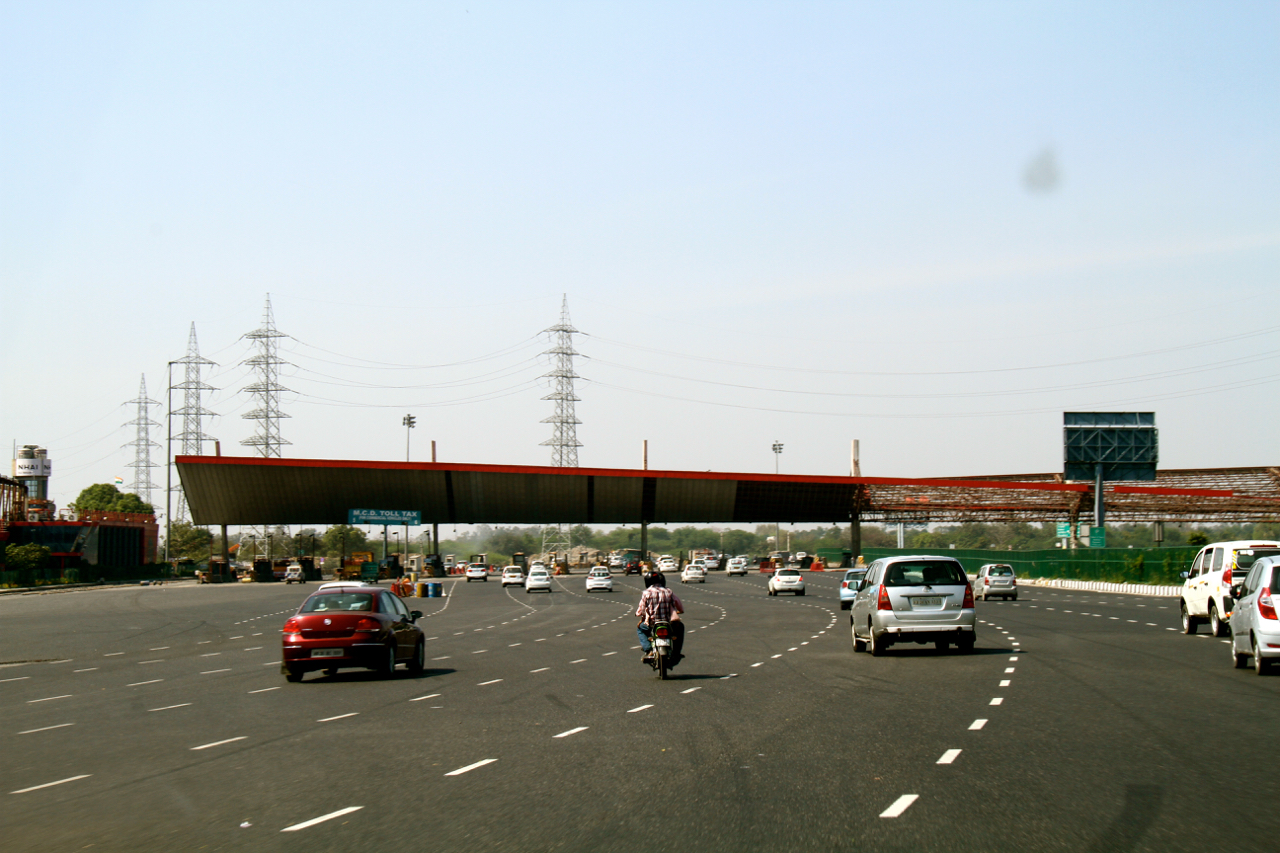
Toll plaza on National Highway 11

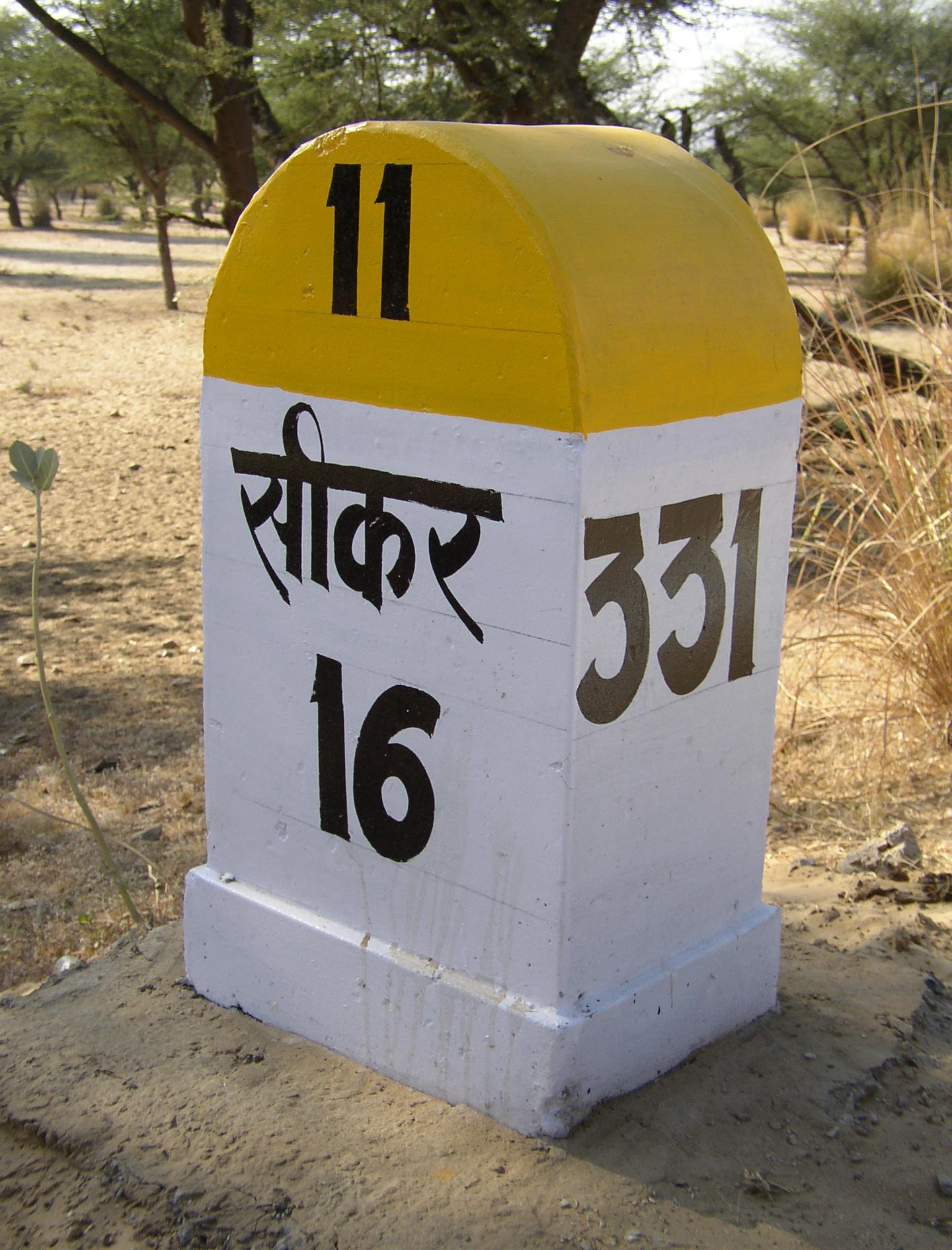
Kilometre sign near Sikar in Rajasthan, India.

Indian National Highway 11 sign

== See also ==
- List of national highways in India
- National Highways Development Project
