= Tatija =

- Village
- Location within Rajasthan Location within India
- Coordinates: 28°03′59″N 75°45′00″E
- Country: India
- State: Rajasthan
- District: Jhunjhunu
- Time zone: UTC+05:30 (IST)
- ISO 3166 code: RJ-IN

Tateeja or Tatija is a village located in Rajasthan's Jhunjhunu district.

Another famous landmark of this village is that it is near to Singhana, the popular bypass from where the foreign tourists pass by while going to the Mandava Castle located in Sikar.

Tatija is a village in Rajasthan, located 180 km from Dhaula Kuan, Delhi. The area contains large agricultural fields managed by landowners.

Many peoples of this village have desire to join Indian Forces [ Indian Army, BSF ]

The main thing or event which is held in Tatija is the local fair of Baba Bhainya; the Baba Bhainya is a deity who has 52 bhairons in his army, and to please him, people of the village wake up for whole night and worship him by loud music which can be heard up to 3 km; this music is not of drum beats of any electronic music.
