= Dhumbadiya =

Dhumbadiya Dhumbariya
- Village
- Location in Rajasthan, India Dhumbadiya (India)
- Coordinates: 25°09′15″N 72°01′14″E
- Country: India
- State: Rajasthan
- District: Jalore

Government
  - Type: Panchayati Raj
  - Body: Gram panchayat
  - Sarpanch: Himata Ram Choudhary

Population (2011)
  - Total: 8,295
  - Male: 4,237
  - Female: 4,058

Languages
  - Official: Hindi
  - Other: Marwari, Rajasthani
- Time zone: UTC+5:30 (IST)
- PIN: 343030
- Telephone code: 02969
- ISO 3166 code: RJ-IN
- Vehicle registration: RJ46
- Lok Sabha constituency: Jalore
- Vidhan Sabha constituency: Bhinmal
- Nearest Railway Station: Marwar Bhinmal

Dhumbadiya is a major village in Jalore district of Rajasthan state. It is a major village of Bagoda Tehsil. It is located 7 km from Bagoda and 32 km from Bhinmal town. Nearest Railway station is Marwar Bhinmal which is 32 km from Dhumbadiya.
