= National Highway 311 (India) =

National Highway in India

National Highway 311
- Map of National Highway 311 in red

Route information
- Auxiliary route of NH 11
- Length: 46 km (29 mi)

Major junctions
- East end: Singhana
- Singhana, Khetri Nagar, Jasrapur, Nagli Saledi Singh, Bhatiwar, Chhawasri, Titanwara, Rajasthan|Singhana]]
- West end: Titanwara

Location
- Country: India
- States: Rajasthan
- Primary destinations: Singhana, Khetri Nagar, Jasrapur, Nagli Saledi Singh, Bhatiwar, Chhawasri, Titanwara, Rajasthan|Singhana]]

Highway system
- Roads in India; Expressways; National; State; Asian
| ← NH 11 | → NH 311 |

National Highway 311, commonly referred to as NH 311 is a national highway in India. It is a spur road of National Highway 11. NH-311 runs in the state of Rajasthan in India.

== Route ==
NH311 connects Singhana, Khetri Nagar, Jasrapur, [charawas]], Bhatiwar, Chhawasari and Titanwara in the state of Rajasthan.

== Junctions ==
NH 11 Terminal near Singhana.

== See also ==
- List of national highways in India
- List of national highways in India by state
