= Baba Umad Singh =

Indian spiritual leader

Personal life
- Born: Buhana, Jhunjhunu district, Rajasthan, India

Religious life
- Temple: Buhana (Chhitri) temple
- Philosophy: Believed in equality of all human beings

Senior posting
- Teacher: Madho Das of Jerpur Pali

Baba Umad Singh was a spiritual leader who lived in Rajasthan, India in the early 19th century. He is regarded as a local deity ("lok-devta").

== Biography ==
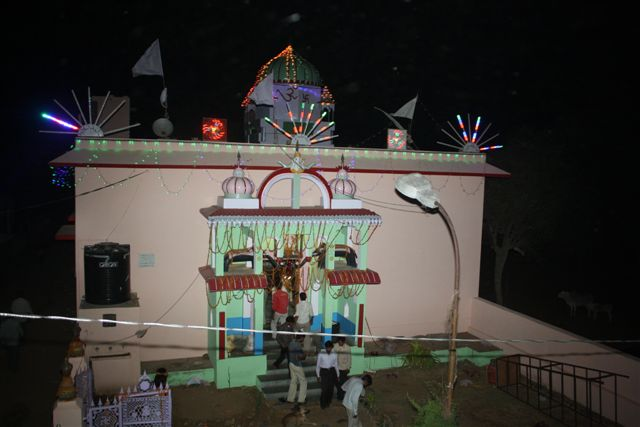
temple of Baba Umad Singh (Chhitri)

Baba Umad Singh was born in the village of Buhana, Jhunjhunu district, Rajasthan. His father was Gulji Singh.

His shrine is in the middle of Buhana tehsil, Jhunjhunu, Rajasthan.

According to local lore, Umad Singh was accepted by Madho Das of Jerpur Pali (Mahendragarh District, Haryana) as his Guru. Umad would visit his guru on foot each day and worked at his ashram during the night.

Madho Das eventually asked Umad to return to his own village, telling him that he would be revered as a deity there.

A similar temple has been constructed in Badbar village, Buhana.

== Philosophy ==
Baba Umad Singh believed in the equality of all human beings, be they high or low, rich or poor.

There is a temple in Buhana (Chhitri) dedicated to him.

== Fair ==
Each year a festival is held at Buhana (185 km from Jaipur and 35 km from Pilani) in memory of Baba Umad Singh. Thousands of devotees gather to pay homage during the annual event, which is held in the month of Jyestha, on the first day of the dark half (Jeth Badi Ekam) of the moon. In the night, the devotees organize cultural programs like jagran/bhajan sandhya (evening). The played songs and bhajans praise the life and history of Baba Umad Singh.

=== Photos of Mela Jagran 2011 ===
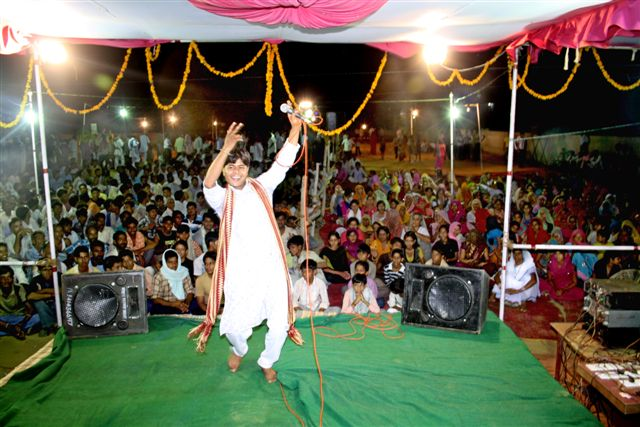
Kushal Singh singing

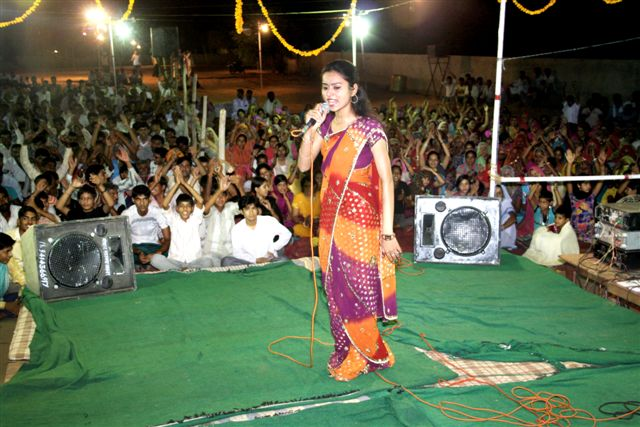
Komal Sharma (Jaipur) singing

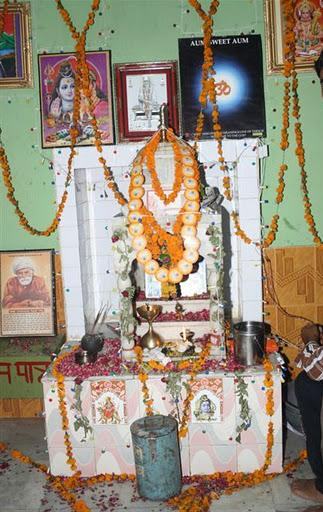
Inside of Temple

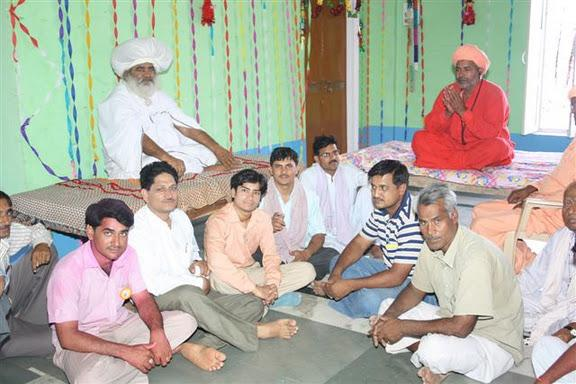
Shri Shri 1008, Shukhveer Nath, Ji Maharaj & Baba Bakhtawar Nath Ji Maharaj and other devotees in temple
