= Balwant Singh =

Balwant Singh may refer to:

== Politics ==
=== Royalty ===
- Balwant Singh of Benares (1711–1770), Maharaja of Benares State 1740–1770
- Balwant Singh of Bharatpur (1820–1853), Maharaja of Bharatpur 1825–1853
- Raja Balwant Singh (1770–97) - 6th Raja of Raghogarh-Vijaypur
- Raja Balwant Singh of Jasrota (formerly Balwant Dev), 18th century, subject of paintings by Nainsukh
- Raja Balwant Singh of Awagarh (1852–1909)
- Balwant Singh, infant Maharaja of Ahmednagar in 1841 for whom Takht Singh served as regent

=== Democratic ===
- Balwant Singh Rajoana (born 1967), Indian policeman convicted for participating in an assassination in 1995
- Balwant Singh Thind (died 1990), Indian politician killed in 1990
- Balwant Singh Ramoowalia (born 1942), Indian politician
- Balwant Singh Rakkha (born 1941), Fijian politician
- Balwant Singh Nandgarh, Indian politician, active from 1997
- Balwant Singh Mankotia, Indian politician in Jammu and Kashmir
- Balwant Singh (Haryana politician), member of the Haryana Legislative Assembly
- Balwant Singh (Punjab politician), legislator of Punjab Legislative Assembly.

== Sport ==
- Balwant Singh (footballer) (born 1986), Indian footballer
- Balwant Singh (volleyball) (?–2010), Indian volleyball player

== Other ==
- Balwant Singh Bakhasar, Indian landowner turned bandit, involved in 1971 war with Pakistan
