= Dulewala =

Village in Punjab, India

Coordinates: 30°56′N 74°33′E

Dulewala is a village in Bathinda district, Punjab, India.

== Nearby places ==
Dulewala is 15.3 km from its Mandal Main Town Phul. Dulewala is 39.2 km from its District Main City Bathinda, and 150 km from its state capital Chandigarh.

Alike, Bhai Rupa Patti Kangar, Bugran, Burj Gill, Burj Mansa, Chotian, Sandhu Khurd are the villages along with this village in the same Phul Mandal.

Nearby villages are Kangar (4.5 km), Bhai Rupa (4.7 km), Dialpura Bhaika (4.7 km), Adampura (5.7 km), Sandhu Khurd (5.9 km). Nearby towns are Bhagta Bhai ka (13.7 km), Phul (15.3 km), Nathana (21.1 km), Rampura Phul (22.7 km).

== History ==
Dulewala was settled when there was a fierce flood in old Dulewala. The people left their houses in old Dulewala and settled in new Dulewala, about 500 meters from the old village. The government distributed plots in new Dulewala due to the absence of flood water. New Dulewala is also known as model village. The nearest village is Salabatpura under the same scheme. Dulewala has a government primary school, with high school and village support, Sant Baba Mani Singh ji.
