= NH 11 =

NH 11 may refer to:

- National Highway 11 (India)
- New Hampshire Route 11
