= Mamaria =

- Village
- Location in India
- Coordinates: 28.14409°N 76.20274°E
- Country: India
- State: Haryana
- District: Rewari district
- ISO 3166 code: IN-HR
- Website: haryana.gov.in

Mamaria is a village in Rewari mandal of the Rewari district, in the Indian state of Haryana. It consists of three adjacent settlements. It is on the Rewari-Narnaul road at about 30 kilometres (19 mi) on the approach District Road. Mamaria can be also accessed through Rewari-Mahendergarh road.

== Demographics ==
The 2011 census of India notes the following statistics.

=== Mamaria Thethar ===
Mamaria Thethar had a population of 889 in 173 households. Males (460) constitute 51.74% of the population and females (429) 48.25%. Mamaria Thethar has an average literacy (632) rate of 71.09%, less than the national average of 74%: male literacy (354) is 56.01%, and female literacy (278) is 43.98% of total literates. In Mamaria Thethar, 12.48% of the population is under 6 years of age (111).

=== Mamaria Ahir ===
Mamaria Ahir had a population of 1235 in 259 households. Males (630) constitute 51.01% of the population and females (605) 48.98%. Mamaria Ahir has an average literacy (869) rate of 70.36%, less than the national average of 74%: male literacy (506) is 58.22%, and female literacy (363) is 41.77% of total literates. In Mamaria Ahir, 12.06% of the population is under 6 years of age (149).

=== Mamaria Assampur ===
Mamaria Assampur had a population of 1561 in 308 households. Males (805) constitute 51.56% of the population and females (900) 48.43%. Mamaria Assampur has an average literacy (1122) rate of 71.87%, less than the national average of 74%: male literacy (672) is 59.89%, and female literacy (450) is 40.1% of total literates. In Mamaria Assampur, 10.63% of the population is under 6 years of age (166).
