= Rajaldesar railway station =

Railway station in Rajasthan, India

Rajaldesar

General information
- Location: Rajaldesar, Churu district, Rajasthan; India
- Coordinates: 28.033682°N 74.477953°E
- Elevation: 307 metres (1,007 ft)
- System: Indian Railways station
- Owner: Indian Railways
- Operator: North Western Railway
- Line: Ratangarh–Bikaner line
- Platforms: 2
- Tracks: 2

Construction
- Structure type: Standard (on ground station)
- Parking: Yes

Other information
- Status: Functioning
- Station code: RJR
- Zone(s): North Western Railway
- Division(s): Bikaner
Location
- Location within India Location within Rajasthan

Rajaldesar railway station is a railway station in Churu district, Rajasthan. Its code is RJR. It serves Rajaldesar town. The station consists of 2 platforms. Passenger, Express, and Superfast trains halt here.

== Trains ==
The following trains halt at Rajaldesar railway station in both directions:

- Bikaner–Delhi Sarai Rohilla Superfast Express
- Howrah–Jaisalmer Superfast Express
- Bikaner–Delhi Sarai Rohilla Intercity Express
