= Khedado Ki Dhani =

- village
- Nickname: Dhani
- Location in Rajasthan, India Khedado Ki Dhani (India)
- Coordinates: 28.1500°N 75.9333°E
- Country: India
- State: Rajasthan

Languages
  - Official: Hindi
- Time zone: UTC+5:30 (IST)
- ISO 3166 code: IN-RJ

Khedado Ki Dhani is a village in Jhunjhunu district of Jaipur division of Rajasthan state. It comes under Pacheri Kalan Police thana area. Sagwara is a nearby village. It can be accessed by a road from Mahendargarh-Narnaul Road. Going to Narnaul from Mahendergarh, it is on the right side approach road to the nearby village of Sagwa.
