= Jamba, Jodhpur =

Jamba Jambha
- Village
- Location in Rajasthan
- Coordinates: 27.13°N 72.36°E
- Country: india
- State: Rajasthan
- District: Jodhpur
- Tehsil/Block: Bap
- Time zone: UTC+5:30 (IST)
- Pin code: 342301
- Telephone code: 02925
- ISO 3166 code: RJ-IN
- Vehicle registration: RJ 43

Jamba is a village in Bap Tehsil in Jodhpur District of Rajasthan. The Jambholav Dham Temple is located here.

The village was in the news for other reasons too.
