= NH 125 =

NH 125 may refer to:

- National Highway 125 (India)
- New Hampshire Route 125, United States
