= Badbar, Rajasthan =

Village in Jhunjhunu (Rajasthan), India

Badbar बडबर
- Village
- Location in Rajasthan, India Badbar (India)
- Coordinates: 28.2377644°N 75.8562328°E
- Country: India
- State: Rajasthan
- District: Jhunjhunu
- Tehsil: Buhana

Government
  - Type: Local Government
  - Body: Gram Panchayat
  - Sarpanch: Vinod Kumar

Population (2011)
  - Total: 5,242

Demography
  - Literacy: 79.44%
- Time zone: UTC+5:30 (IST)
- PIN: 333502
- Area code: 01593
- Vehicle registration: RJ-53
- Website: Jhunjhunu District

Badbar is a village located in the Buhana Tehsil of Jhunjhunu District, Rajasthan, India. It is located in shekhawati region, approx. 55 km east of Jhunjhunu city and 35 km north-west of Pilani. Hundreds of Badbar's residents serve in the armed forces and the paramilitary forces.

== Demographics ==
At the time of the 2011 National Census, the village's population was 5,242 in 942 households.

Sex Ratio in Badbar (2011)
Male	51.85%
Female	48.15%

As per Constitution of India and Panchyati Raj Act, Badbar village is administrated by Sarpanch (Head of Village) who is an elected representative of village.

Literacy in Badbar (2011)
Male	89.25%
Female	69.28%

== Neighborhoods ==
To the north of Badbar is Surajgarh, Loharu, Pilani. To the east is Jhanjha, Narat, Dhulwa, Ghaseda. To the south is Buhana, Singhana, Pacheri, Khetri, Babai, Narnaul. To the west is Chirawa, Bagar, Jhunjhunu, Bissau, Churu.
