= National Highway 168 (India) =

National highway in India

National Highway 168
- Map of the National Highway in red

Route information
- Auxiliary route of NH 68
- Length: 144 km (89 mi)

Major junctions
- West end: Tharad
- East end: Sirohi

Location
- Country: India
- States: Gujarat, Rajasthan

Highway system
- Roads in India; Expressways; National; State; Asian
| ← NH 167 | → NH 169 |

National Highway 168, commonly called NH 168 is a national highway in India. It is a spur road of National Highway 68. NH-168 traverses the states of Gujarat and Rajasthan in India.

== Route ==
=== Gujarat ===
Tharad, Dhanera.

=== Rajasthan ===
Reoder, Anadra, Sirohi .

== Junctions ==
NH 68 Terminal near Tharad.
NH 168A near Dhanera.
NH 62 Terminal near Sirohi.

== See also ==
- List of national highways in India
- List of national highways in India by state
