= National Highway 62 (India) =

National highway in India

National Highway 62
- Map of National Highway 62 in red

Route information
- Length: 748 km (465 mi)

Major junctions
- North end: NH 7 in Abohar, Punjab
- List: NH 354E in Abohar, Punjab; NH 911 / NH 954 in Sri Ganganagar, Rajasthan; NH 54 in Kenchiya, Rajasthan; NH 11 in Bikaner, Rajasthan; NH 754K in Deshnoke, Rajasthan; NH 25 / NH 125 in Jodhpur, Rajasthan; NH 162 in Pali, Rajasthan; NH 325 in Sanderao, Rajasthan; NH 168 in Sirohi, Rajasthan
- South end: NH 27 in Pindwara, Rajasthan

Location
- Country: India
- States: Punjab, Rajasthan
- Primary destinations: Abohar, Sri Ganganagar, Lunkaransar, Bikaner, Nokha, Nagaur, Jodhpur, Pali

Highway system
- Roads in India; Expressways; National; State; Asian
← NH 61	→ NH 63

National Highway 62 (NH 62) is a National Highway in India connecting Abohar in Punjab to Pindwara in Rajasthan.

The section between Nagaur and Bikaner has been approved to be widened to 4 lanes.
