= Dhani Bhaloth =

- Village
- Location in Rajasthan, India Dhani Bhaloth (India)
- Coordinates: 28°17′51″N 76°04′09″E
- Country: India
- State: Rajasthan
- District: Jhunjhunu
- Tehsil: Buhana

Government
  - Body: Gram panchayat
- Elevation: 338 m (1,109 ft)

Population (2011)
  - Total: 2,233

Languages
  - Official: Hindi
- Time zone: UTC+5:30 (IST)
- PIN: 333515
- ISO 3166 code: RJ-IN
- Vehicle registration: RJ-18

Dhani Bhaloth is a village in Buhana tehsil of Jhunjhunu district in Rajasthan. It has a government school and its main economic activity is the cultivation of mustard, wheat, bajra and channa.

There is an annual fair held at the Narsingh temple.

The nearest railway station is 18 kilometres (11 mi) distant at Mahendragarh.
