= National Highway 168A (India) =

National highway in India

National Highway 168A
- Map of the National Highway in red

Route information
- Auxiliary route of NH 68
- Length: 76 km (47 mi)

Major junctions
- North end: Sanchore
- South end: Deesa

Location
- Country: India
- States: Rajasthan, Gujarat

Highway system
- Roads in India; Expressways; National; State; Asian
← NH 68	→ NH 27

National Highway 168A, commonly called NH 168A is a national highway in India. It is a spur road of National Highway 68. NH-168A traverses the states of Gujarat and Rajasthan in India.

== Route ==
=== Rajasthan ===
Sanchore

=== Gujarat ===
Dhanera, Deesa.

== Junctions ==
NH 68 Terminal near Sanchore.
NH 168 near Dhanera
NH 27 Terminal near Deesa.

== See also ==
- List of national highways in India
- List of national highways in India by state
