= National Highway 925 (India) =

National Highway in India

National Highway 925
- Map of National Highway 925 in red

Route information
- Auxiliary route of NH 25
- Length: 134 km (83 mi)

Major junctions
- North end: Gagaria
- South end: Bakhasar

Location
- Country: India
- States: Rajasthan

Highway system
- Roads in India; Expressways; National; State; Asian
← NH 25	→ NH 925

National Highway 925, commonly referred to as NH 925 is a national highway in India. It is a spur road of National Highway 25. NH-925 runs in the state of Rajasthan in India.

== Route ==
NH925 connects Gagaria, Baori kalan, Serwa and Bakhasar in the state of Rajasthan.

Bairadvalley village

== See also ==
- List of national highways in India
- List of national highways in India by state
