= National Highway 354E (India) =

National highway in India

National Highway 354E

Route information
- Auxiliary route of NH 54
- Length: 50.89 km (31.62 mi)

Major junctions
- East end: Dabwali
- West end: Abohar

Location
- Country: India
- States: Punjab
- Primary destinations: Sitogunno

Highway system
- Roads in India; Expressways; National; State; Asian
| ← NH 54 | → NH 62 |

National Highway 354E, commonly referred to as NH 354E is a national highway in India. It is a spur road of National Highway 54. NH-354E traverses the state of Punjab in India.

== Project development ==
The Ministry of Road Transport and Highways has approved rehabilitation and widening of existing road to 2 lanes with paved shoulders. The project also involves construction of a major high level bridge. The project is estimated to cost 322.48 crore rupees and is required to be executed at engineering, procurement, and construction mode. 32.15 crore has been allocated for felling of 10,650 trees and compensatory afforestation.

== Route ==
Dabwali, Sito Gunno, Abohar.

== Junctions ==
NH 54 Terminal near Dabwali.
NH 62 Terminal near Abohar.

== See also ==
- List of national highways in India
- List of national highways in India by state
