= National Highway 70 (India) =

National highway in India

National Highway 70
- Map of National Highway 70 in red

Route information
- Length: 323 km (201 mi)

Major junctions
- South end: NH 25 in Munabao
- NH 11 in Myailar
- North end: NH 68 in Tanot

Location
- Country: India
- States: Rajasthan

Highway system
- Roads in India; Expressways; National; State; Asian
← NH 25	→ NH 68

National Highway 70, commonly referred to as NH 70 is a primary national highway in India. NH-70 traverses the state of Rajasthan in India. It is part of Bharatmala pariyojana.

== Route ==
NH25 near Munabao, Sundra, Myajlar, Dhanana, Asutar, Ghotaru, Longewala, NH68 near Tanot.

== See also ==
- List of national highways in India
- List of national highways in India by state
