= Balwant Singh Bakhasar =

Dacoit from Rajasthan, India

- Born: Balwant Singh Chouhan; Bakhasar
- Occupation: Dacoit
- Known for: Indo Pak war 1971 Contribution

Thakur Balwant Singh Bakhasar was the dacoit of Bakhasar in Barmer district. The areas of his operation and influence were bordering areas of Barmer district, Sanchore in Rajasthan.

== Role in the 1971 war with Pakistan ==
In the 1971 war with Pakistan Balwant Singh Bakhasar, with his close associates helped and guided the Commandos of Indian Army to capture various parts of Sindh. The elite Indian Para Commandos under the command of Lt.Col.His Highness Sawai Bhawani Singh of Jaipur attacked Chachro town in Pakistan at about 3 AM on 7 December 1971. The force was divided in two groups mounted on 4wd Jonga Jeeps with MMGs and loaded with supplies. The Indian Commandos captured Chachro by day light taking 17 prisoners. Later, they attacked Virawah and captured it after dealing with the LMG position. After success in capturing the towns, the groups ex filtrated to India via Bakhasar where they were fired upon by BSF post however the confusion was later sorted out.
