= National Highway 911 (India) =

National Highway in India

National Highway 911
- Map of National Highway 911 in red

Route information
- Auxiliary route of NH 11
- Length: 184 km (114 mi)

Major junctions
- South end: Bap
- North end: Sri Ganganagar

Location
- Country: India
- States: Rajasthan

Highway system
- Roads in India; Expressways; National; State; Asian
← NH 11	→ NH 62

National Highway 911, commonly referred to as NH 911 is a national highway in India. It is a spur road of National Highway 11. NH-911 runs in the state of Rajasthan in India. The route of national highway 911 was further extended to Sri Ganganagar in Rajasthan.

== Route ==
NH911 connects Bap, Naukh, Bikampur, Charanwala, Ranjitpura, Goru(Godu), R.D.95, Gokul, Dandkala, Jaggasar, Dantour, Pugal, Sattasar, chhattargarh, Rojhri, Gharsana, Anupgarh, Raisinghnagar, Gajsinghpur, karanpur and Sadhuwali(Sri Ganganagar) in the state of Rajasthan.

== Junctions ==
NH 11 Terminal near Bap.
NH 62 Terminal near Sadhuwali (Sri Ganganagar).

== See also ==
- List of national highways in India
- List of national highways in India by state
