= Dyalpura Bhaika =

Village in Punjab, India

- Village
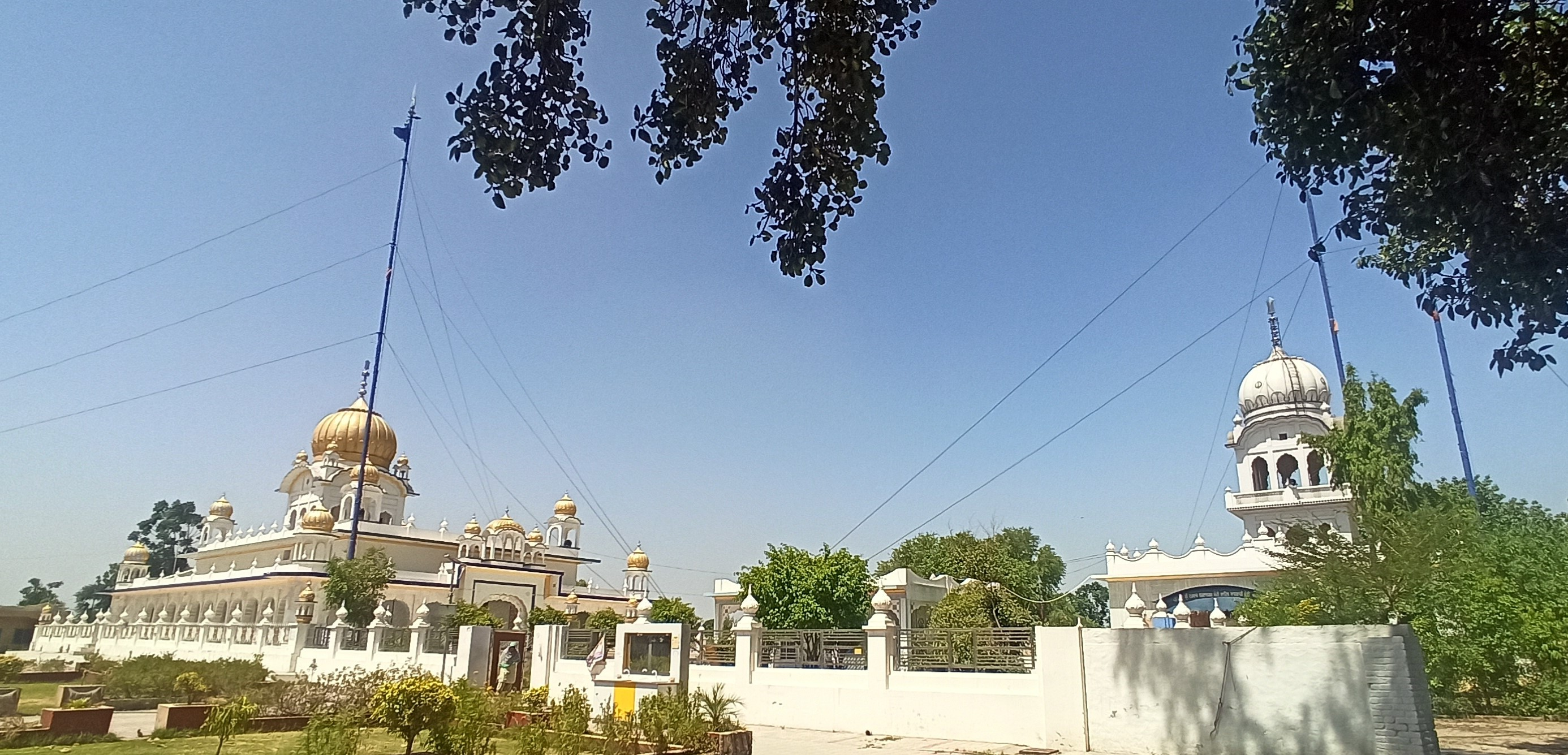
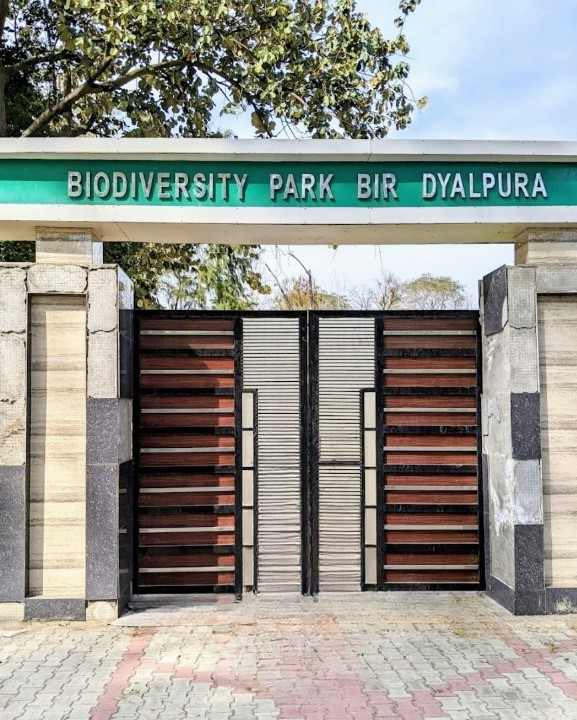
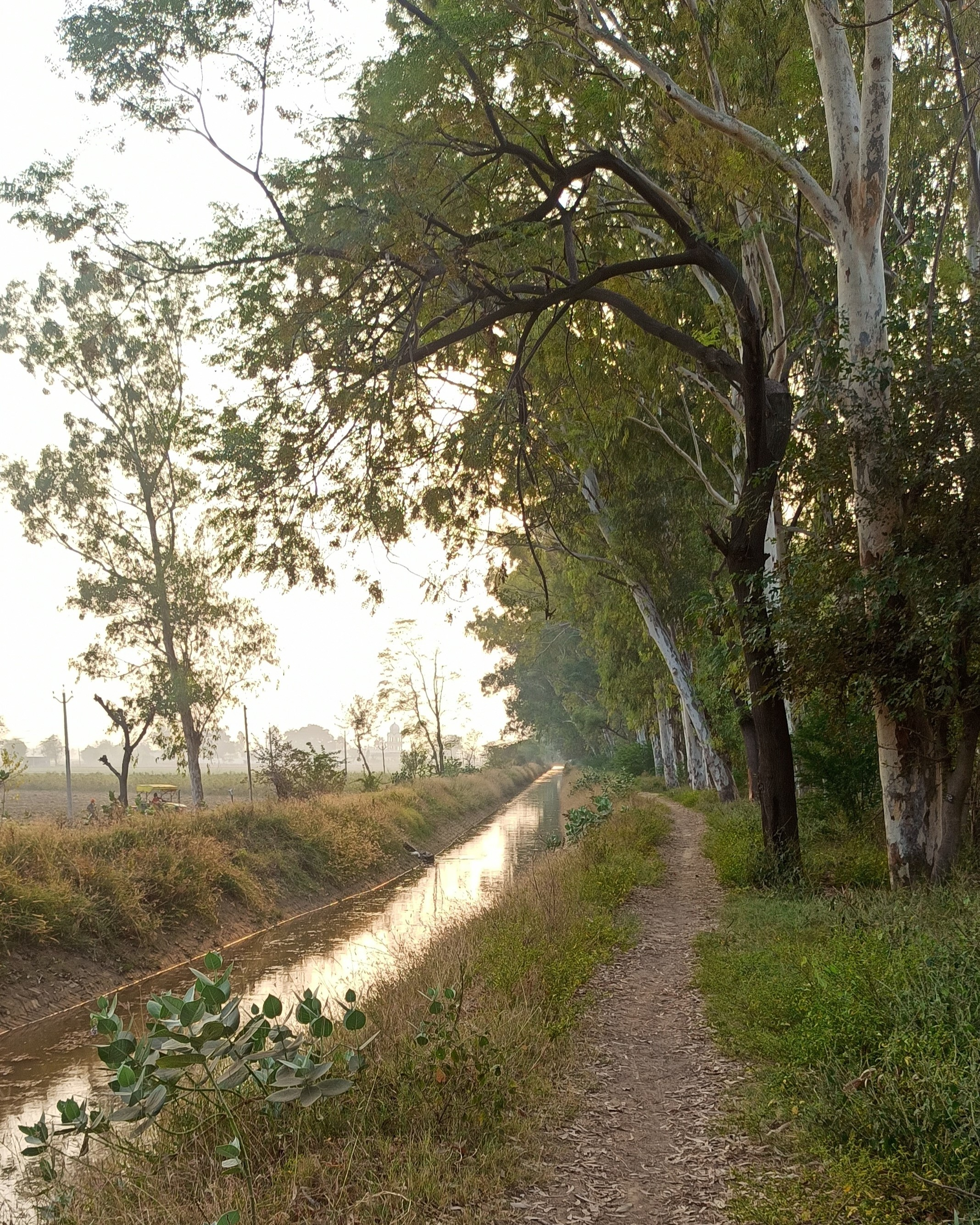
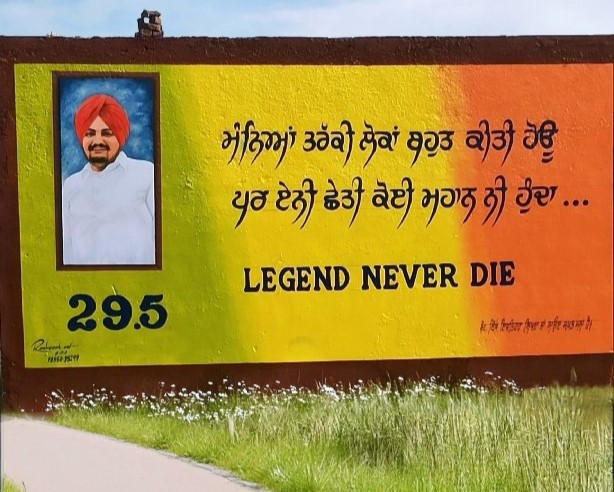
- Top: Gurudwara Zafarnama Sahib Patshahi X, Biodiversity Park Bir Dyalpura, Path along the village canal, Street Art dedicated to Punjabi Singer Sidhu Moosewala
- Nickname: Dialpura Bhai ka
- Location within Punjab
- Coordinates: 30°28′54″N 75°12′09″E
- Country: India
- State: Punjab
- District: Bathinda
- Founder: Bhai Dial Singh

Area
  - Total: 1.65 km^{2} (0.64 sq mi)

Population (2011)
  - Total: 5,066
  - Density: 3,070/km^{2} (7,950/sq mi)
- Demonym: Dyalpuri

Languages
  - Official: Punjabi
- Time zone: UTC+5:30 (IST)
- PIN: 151108
- Telephone code: 91-1652
- Website: bathinda.nic.in

Dyalpura Bhaika is a village in the sub-division Rampura Phul and block Phul in the Bathinda district of the Punjab. It is situated in the Malwa region of Punjab, which is known for its agricultural productivity and vibrant cultural heritage. Geographically, it is bordered by Kishangarh and Raunta in the North, Jalal in the west, Bhai Rupa and Gumti Kalan in the south, and Salabatpura in the east. The village is part of the Faridkot Lok Sabha constituency, and the Rampura Phul Assembly Constituency.

== History ==
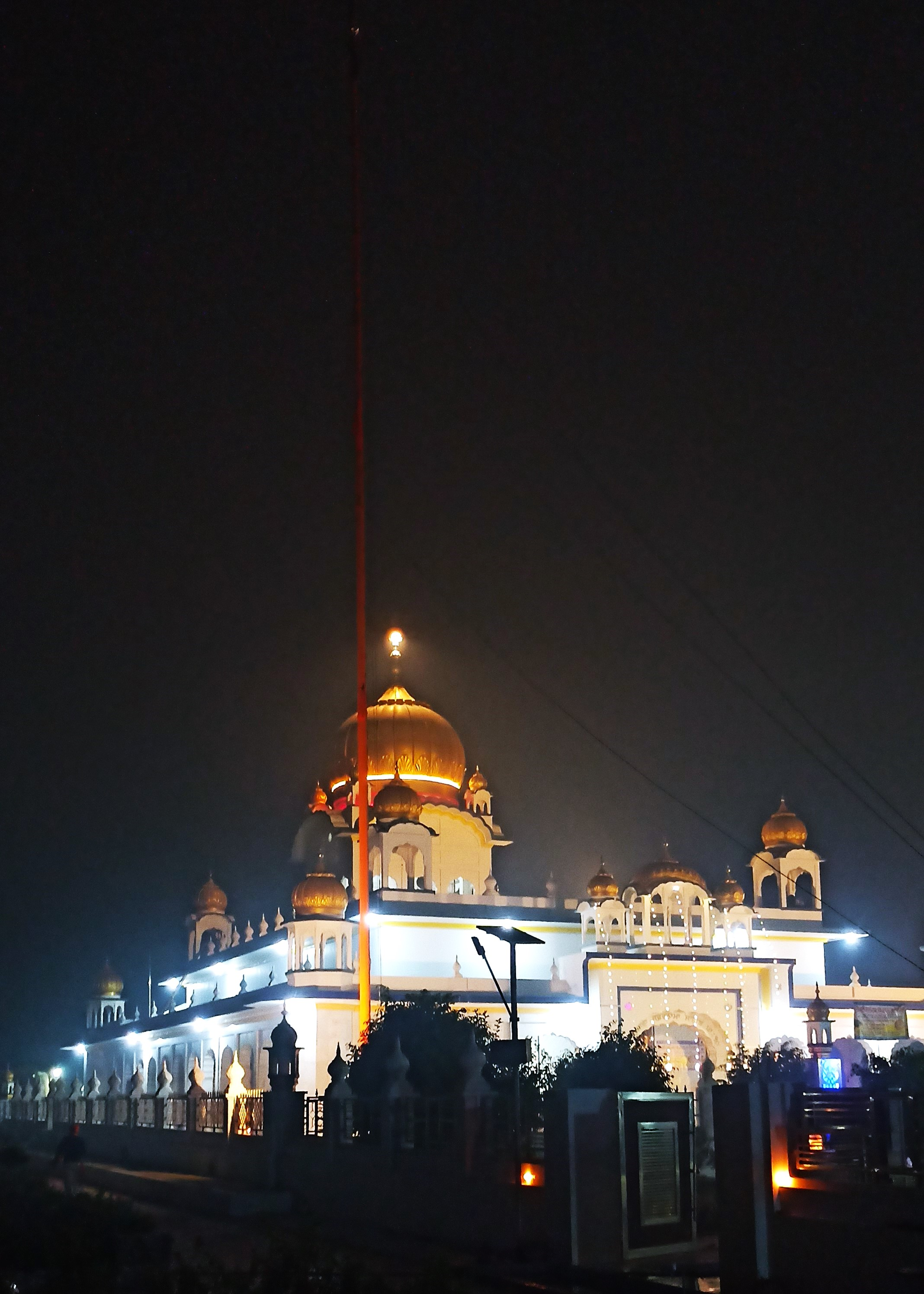
Gurudwara Zafarnamah Sahib Patshahi X at Night

Dyalpura Bhaika, named in honor of Bhai Dial Singh, a descendant of Baba Bhai Roop Chand Ji (1614–1709), was established around the mid-18th century. It is home to the revered Gurudwara Zafarnamah Sahib Patshahi X, which holds significant historical importance.

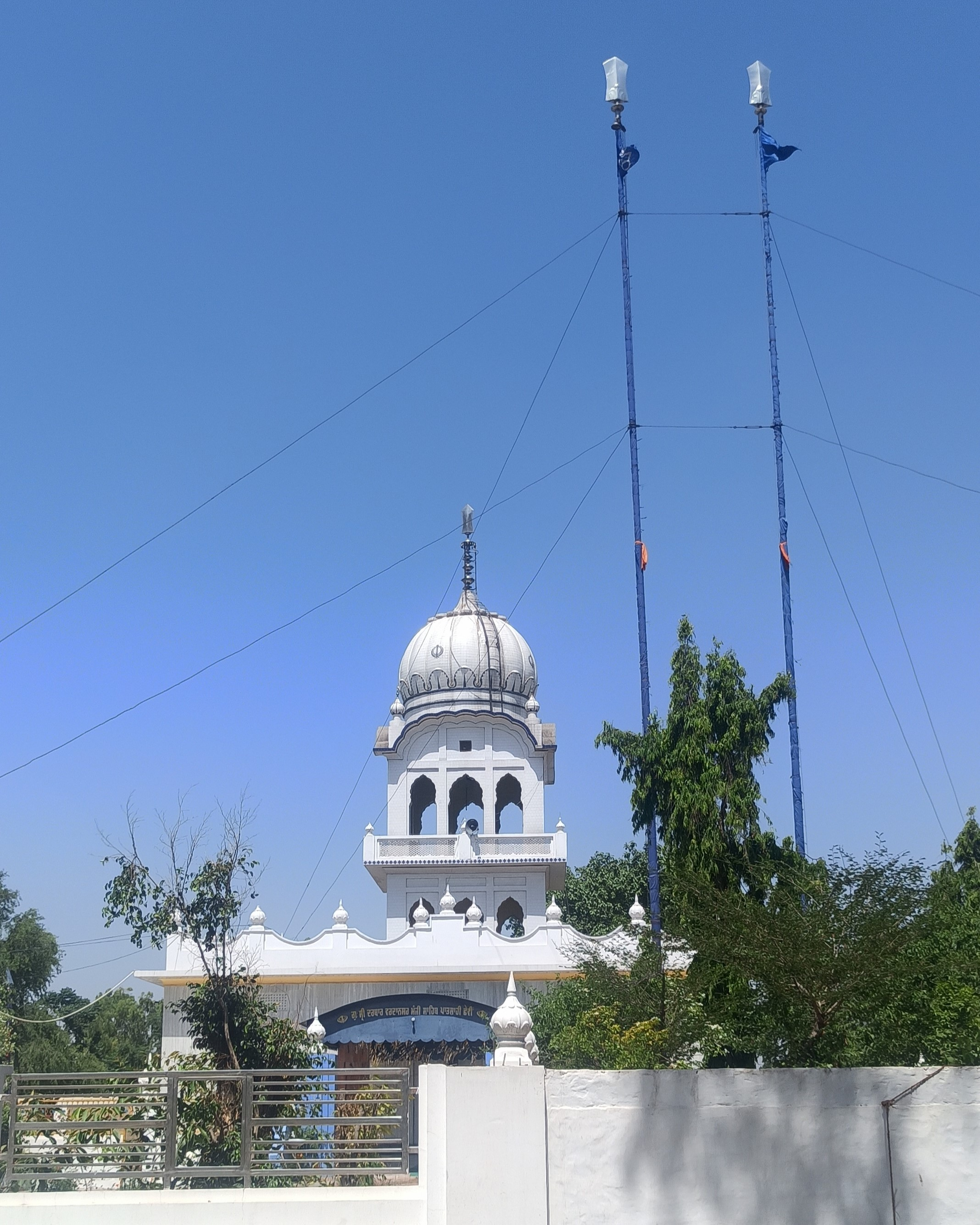
Gurudwara Sri Darbar Vardaansar Manji Sahib Patshahi VI

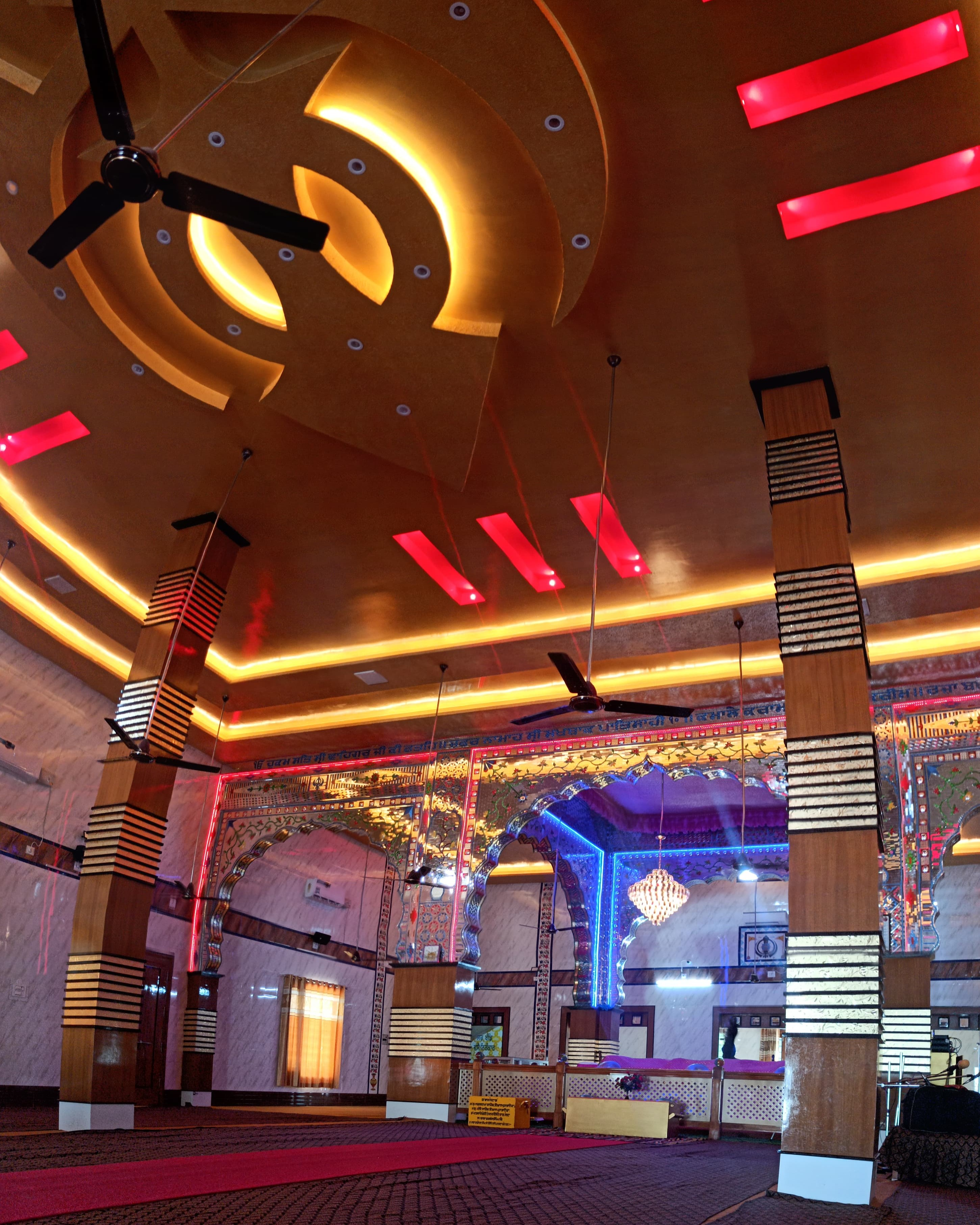
Interior View of Gurudwara Zafarnama Sahib Patshahi X

== Demographics ==
=== Population ===
According to the Census of India 2011, the population of Dyalpura is 5066, with 2734 males and 2332 females. The village population of children with age 0-6 is 578 which makes up 11.41% of the total population of the village. The average Sex Ratio of Dyalpura Bhaika village is 853, which is lower than the Punjab state average of 895. However, the child Sex Ratio for Dyalpura Bhaika, as per the census, is 853, higher than the Punjab average of 846.

=== Religion ===
Religion in Dyalpura Bhaika
Religion	Percent
Sikhism	91.31%
Hinduism	5.59%
Islam	1.40%
Others	1.70%

Sikhism is the dominant religion in Dyalpura Bhaika, with 91.31% of the population adhering to it. Hinduism follows with 5.59%, while Islam constitutes 1.4% of the population.

== Education ==
There are two government and one private school in this village

- Government Senior Secondary School, Dyalpura
- Government Elementary School (Branch), Dyalpura
- St. Xavier Convent School, Dyalpura Bhaika

== Attractions ==
=== Biodiversity Park ===
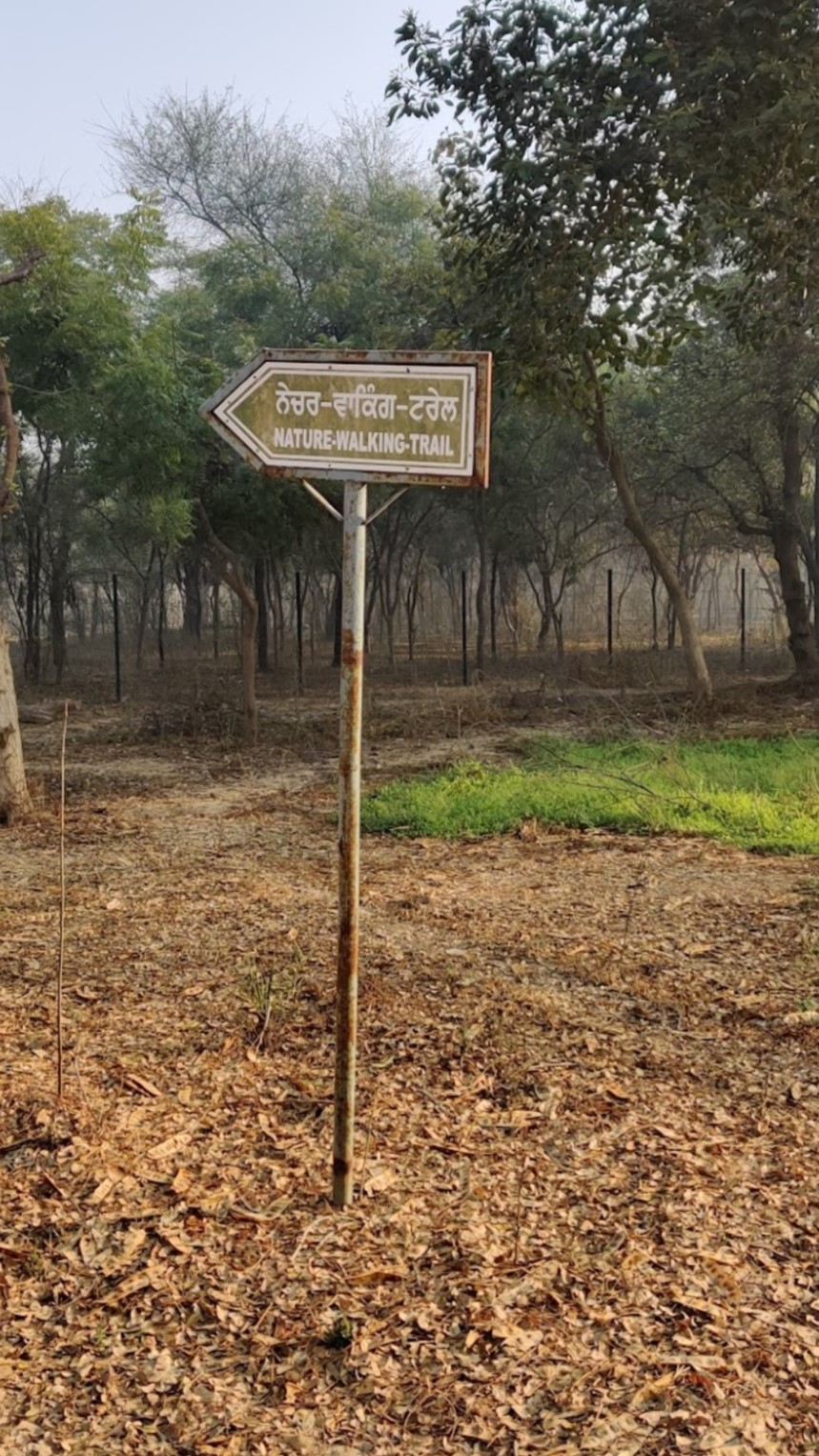
Signboard directing towards the walking Trail in Bir Dyalpura

Biodiversity Park Bir Dyalpura is a sanctuary showcasing the diverse flora and fauna of the Malwa region. Spread over 202 acres along the Barnala-Bajakhana Road (SH43), the park was upgraded from a Forest Department nursery to a fully developed park in 2015, with an investment of ₹2.28 crores.

The park offers various facilities for visitors and workers, including a nature walking trail, benches, swings for children, clean drinking water, an inspection bungalow, and rain shelters.

The park, with a 6.5 km perimeter, is home to seven mammal species and approximately 35 bird species. Notable inhabitants include blue bulls, jackals, common mongooses, hares, jungle cats, porcupines, Rhesus macaque, and various snake species. Bird species such as Indian peafowls, baya weavers, bulbuls, woodpeckers, cattle egrets, herons, kingfishers, mynas, doves, parakeets, and quails are also present.

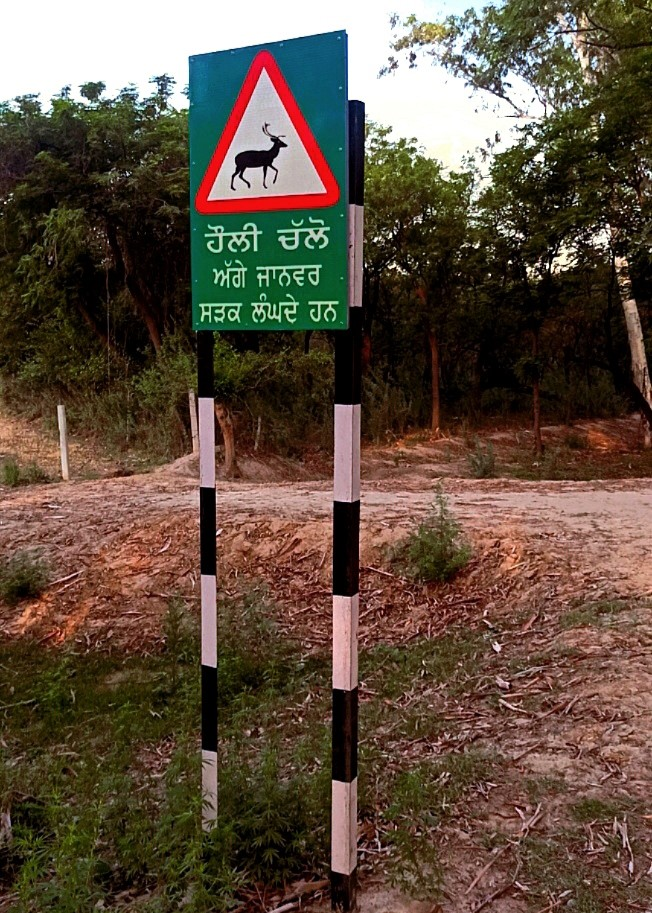
Signboard advising drivers to slow down for crossing animals near Bir Dyalpura Park

The park has 52 tree species, including Mulberry, Neem, Arjuna, Rosewood, Burma Dek, and Amaltas, which provide habitat for a variety of bird species. The Forest Department maintains two ponds within the park to provide drinking water for the wildlife.

=== Worship Places ===
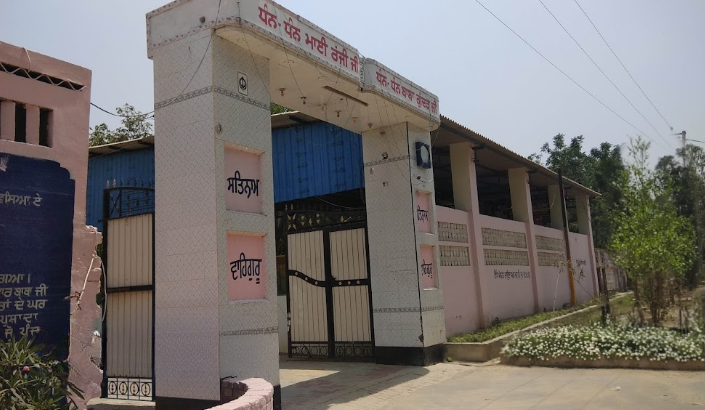
Entrance to the Samadh Mai Rajji-Baba Guddar Ji

- Gurudwara Zafarnamah Sahib Patshahi X
- Gurudwara Sri Manji Sahib
- Samadh Mai Rajji-Baba Guddar Ji
- Mai Rajji Langar Hall
- Gurudwara Bhai Amar Singh Ji
- Gurudwara Bhai Jeevan Singh Ji
- Shri Radha Krishna Mandir
- Masjid, Dyalpura Bhaika

== Economy ==
=== Agriculture and Farming ===
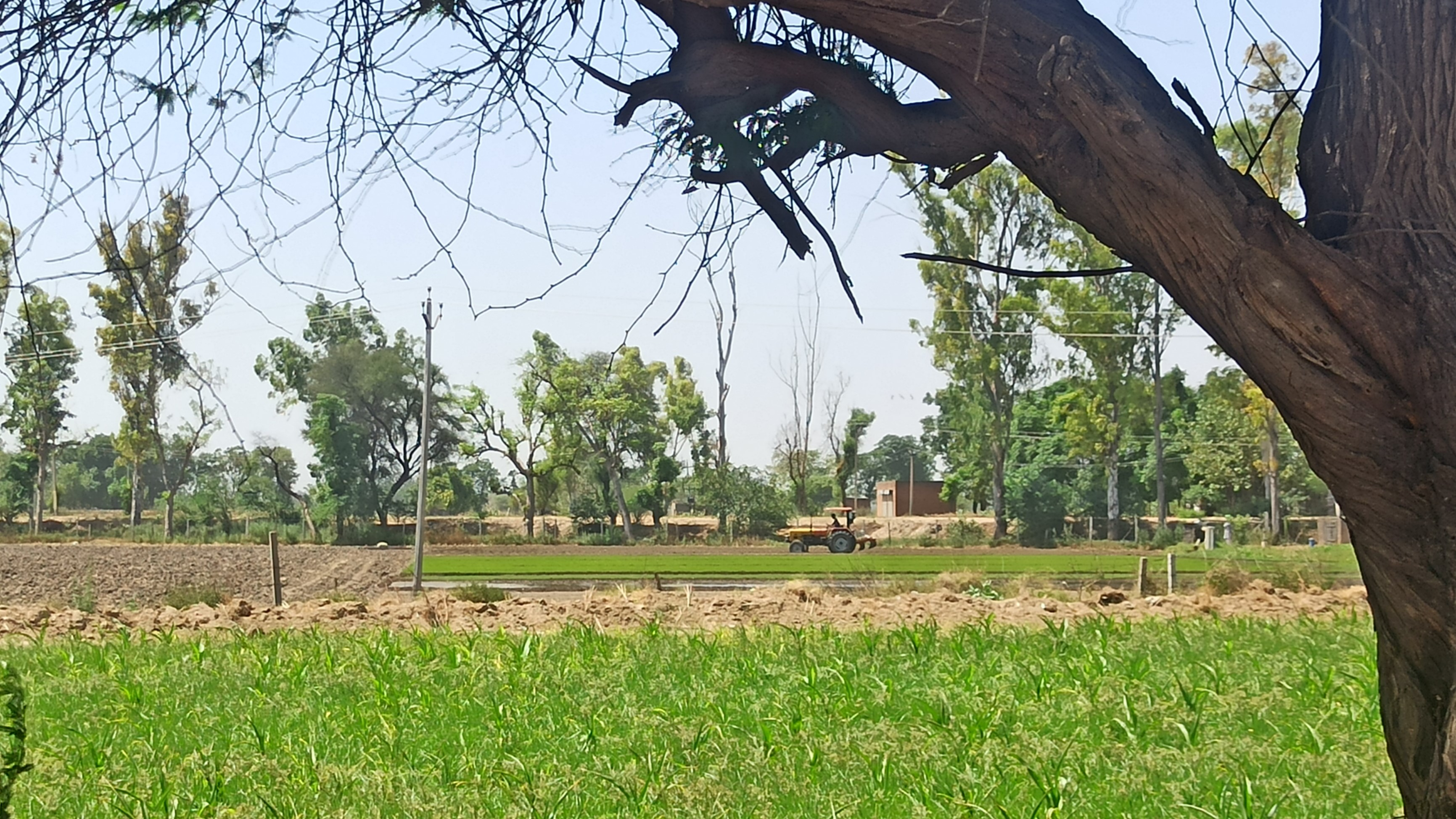
A farmer plowing his field with a tractor

Agriculture is the backbone of Dyalpura Bhaika's economy. A significant portion of the population is involved in farming, cultivating crops such as wheat, rice, and cotton, which are staple to the region's agrarian economy. The fertile soil and favorable climatic conditions contribute to the high yield of these crops, making agriculture the predominant source of income for many households.

=== Private Employment ===
In addition to agriculture, private employment opportunities play a crucial role in the economic landscape of Dyalpura Bhaika. Key sectors include:

- Woodworks: Skilled artisans in the village are engaged in woodwork, producing furniture and other wooden items that are sold both locally and in nearby markets.
- Construction: Construction activities in Dyalpura Bhaika are primarily undertaken by the Mistri and Tarkhan communities. These skilled workers are involved in building houses and other structures, providing essential services that contribute to the village's economic stability.
- Dairy Farming: The presence of the Punjab government-owned MilkFed Verka Coop Dairy is a notable feature of the village's economy. This dairy not only supplies milk and dairy products to the region but also serves as a source of income for the local populace.

=== Seasonal Employment ===
For economically disadvantaged individuals, the Mahatma Gandhi National Rural Employment Guarantee Act (MGNREGA) provides crucial seasonal employment. This government scheme ensures that the poorer sections of the village can earn a livelihood, especially during off-peak agricultural seasons, by engaging in various public works.

== Facilities ==
=== Bus stands ===
- Main bus stand (SH43 Punjab), Dyalpura Bhaika
- New Dyalpura bus stand (NH254), New Dyalpura
- Jalal bus stand

=== Hospitals ===
- Veterinary Hospital, Dana Mandi
- Dispensary
- Several Medical Clinics & Stores

=== Public Facilities ===
- State Bank of India, Dyalpura Bhaika
- Police Station, Dyalpura Camp
- India Post office

=== Other facilities ===
- Public Park (Parque Público)
- R.O. Water Plant
- Cremation Grounds

== Notable people ==
- Devinder Pal Singh Bhullar, a Sikh activist and a former professor
- Gyani Bakshish Singh Dyalpuri, a religious singer & lyricist
