= Bedi, Gujarat =

Bedi
- Census town
- Location in Gujarat, India Bedi (India)
- Coordinates: 22.5°N 70.05°E
- Country: India
- State: Gujarat
- District: Jamnagar
- Elevation: 7 m (23 ft)

Population (2001)
  - Total: 18,771

Languages
  - Official: Gujarati, Hindi
- Time zone: UTC+5:30 (IST)
- Vehicle registration: GJ
- Website: gujaratindia.com

Bedi is a census town and port in Jamnagar Taluka of Jamnagar district, Gujarat, India.

== History ==
It was a major harbour of Nawanagar State, a princely state in British India.

== New Bedi Port ==
In 2022 the New Bedi Port was opened in Jamnagar, Gujarat which will offer enhanced connectivity and a new dimension to trade and commerce in the Saurashtra region. It is being developed under ambitious Rs 100 lakh crore Gati Shakti Master Plan that offers multi-modal connectivity to more than 1,200 industrial clusters.The project was executed by Gujarat Rail Infrastructure Development Corporation (G-RIDE), the Gujarat government's joint venture with the Indian Railways.

== Geography ==
Bedi is located at 22.5°N 70.05°E. It has an average elevation of 7 metres (22 feet).

== Demographics ==
As of 2001 India census, Bedi had a population of 18,771. Males constitute 51% of the population and females 49%. Bedi has an average literacy rate of 33%, lower than the national average of 59.5%; with 73% of the males and 27% of females literate. 18% of the population is under 6 years of age.
