= Gumti Kalan =

Coordinates: 30°26′N 75°10′E

- village
- Interactive map of Gumti Kalan
- Country: India
- State: Punjab
- District: Bathinda

Languages
  - Official: Punjabi
- Time zone: UTC+5:30 (IST)
- PIN: 151106

Gumti Kalan is a village located in Bathinda District in the Indian state of Punjab.
