= National Highway 151A (India) =

National Highway in India

National Highway 151A
- Map of National Highway 151A in red

Route information
- Auxiliary route of NH 51
- Length: 290 km (180 mi)

Major junctions
- West end: Dwarka
- East end: Maliya

Location
- Country: India
- States: Gujarat

Highway system
- Roads in India; Expressways; National; State; Asian
← NH 51	→ NH 27

National Highway 151A, commonly referred to as NH 151A is a national highway in India. It is a secondary route of National Highway 51.

NH-151A runs in the state of Gujarat in India. It starts at National Highway 51 Karungaa Chokdi in Dwarka and ends at Maliya junction of National Highway 27 in the Morbi district.

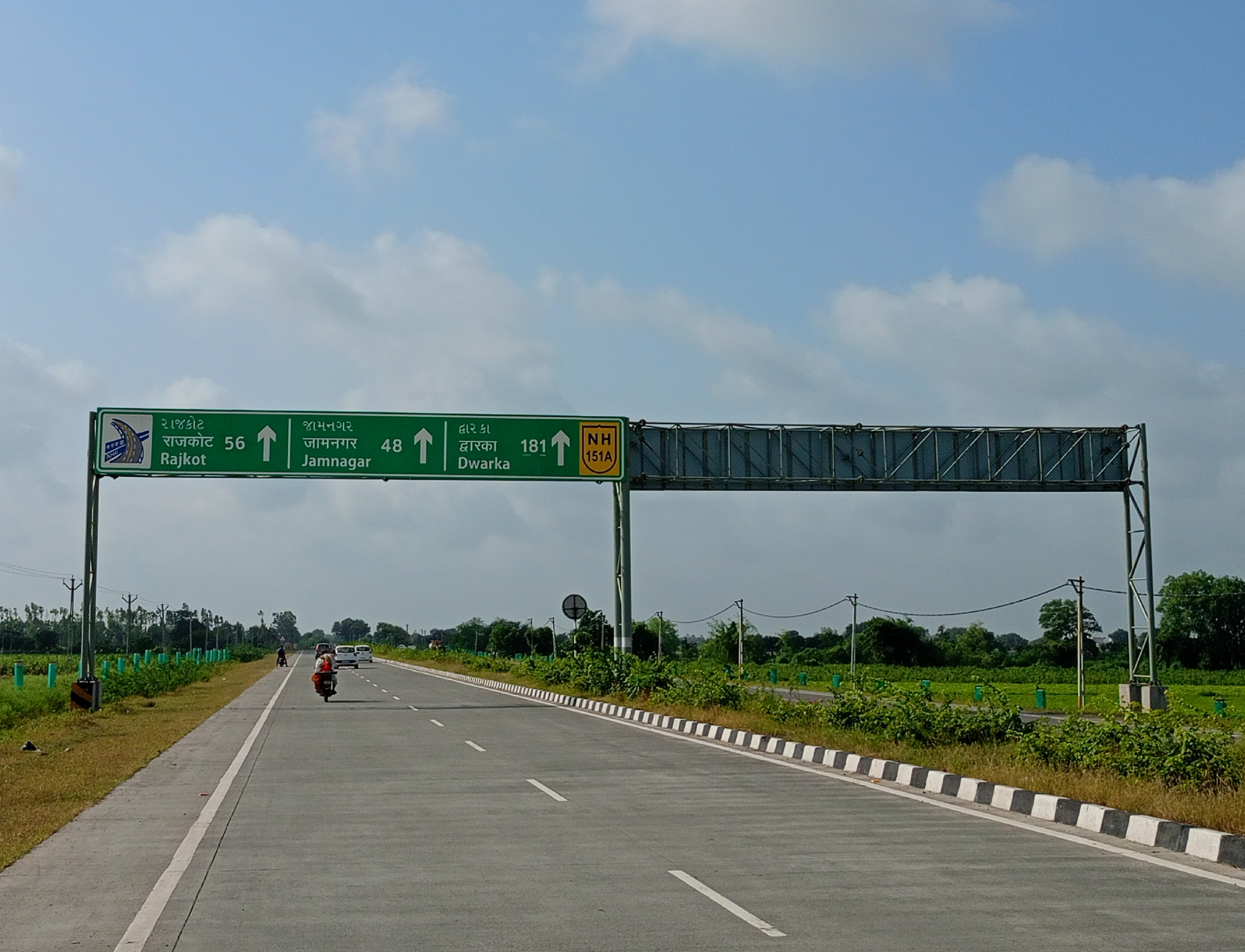
NH151A signboard at Lakhtar Village boundary in Jodiya

== Route ==
NH151A connects Dwarka, Khambaliya, Jamnagar, Dhrol, Amran and Maliya in the state of Gujarat.

== Junctions ==
NH 51 Terminal near Dwarka.
NH 927D near Jamnagar
NH 27 Terminal near Maliya.

== See also ==
- List of national highways in India
- List of national highways in India by state
