= Dhandhaniya =

Village in Jodhpur (Rajasthan), India

- Location in Rajasthan, India Dhandhaniya (India)
- Coordinates: 26°18′31.6″N 72°33′54.3″E
- Country: India
- State: Rajasthan
- District: Jodhpur
- Tehsil: Balesar
- Elevation: 273 m (896 ft)

Population (2001)
  - Total: 901

Languages
  - Official: Hindi
- Time zone: UTC+5:30 (IST)
- PIN: 342001
- ISO 3166 code: RJ-IN

Dhandhaniya is a village in Jodhpur district, Rajasthan, India.
