= Sangat, India =

Sangat
- city
- Location in Punjab, India Sangat (India)
- Coordinates: 30.0932°N 74.8449°E
- Country: India
- State: Punjab
- District: Bathinda

Population (2012)
  - Total: 5,396

Languages
  - Official: Punjabi
- Time zone: UTC+5:30 (IST)

Sangat is a suburb town of Bathinda City and a municipal council in Bathinda district in the Indian state of Punjab. Sangat Mandi is situated 20 km (12 mi) away from Bathinda District headquarter in south. Sangat is a small commercial hub of the area.

== Demographics ==
As of the 2001 India census, Sangat had a population of 5396. Males constitute 53% of the population and females 47%. Sangat has an average literacy rate of 52%, lower than the national average of 59.5%: male literacy is 57%, and female literacy is 47%. In Sangat, 13% of the population is under 6 years of age.

== Popular villages ==
Ghudda, Dhunike, ਬਾਂਡੀ, ਮੁਹਾਲਾਂ, Doomwali, Pathrala, Jassi-Baghwali, Amarpura urf gurthari, Jodhpur Bagga Singh (Phallar), Kotli Sabo
