= Tibba =

- Village
- Location in Punjab, India Tibba (India)
- Coordinates: 30.4876°N 75.6967°E
- Country: India
- State: Punjab
- District: Kapurthala

Government
  - Sarpanch: Jaswinder Kaur

Area
  - Total: 3,401 km^{2} (1,313 sq mi)
- Elevation: 228 m (748 ft)

Population (2001)
  - Total: 19,508
  - Density: 5.736/km^{2} (14.86/sq mi)

Languages
  - Official: Punjabi
- Time zone: UTC+5:30 (IST)
- PIN: 144 628
- Telephone code: 01828
- Vehicle registration: PB 09, PB 41

Tibba, previously known as Tiba, is an ancient village in Kapurthala District in the state of Punjab, India. It was once known for the rural sport of Punjab, Kabaddi and Pehalwani. This village is connected to Goindwal sahib, Kapurthala District, Sultanpur Lodhi from corresponding side and many other villages and cities.

== Geography ==
The ancient village is located almost 390 kilometres from Delhi, and about 80 kilometres from Amritsar. Tibba is named after a word of Punjabi "Tibba", means a higher place. It has river Beas near it and many coordinating canals. All the water from these canals and river normally overflow in the rainy season and Village tibba called mainly "tibba" as it is a higher place safer from all that. In the later sixties, an advance Bandh was built to protect this area from unwanted over flow. It is located on Goindwal sahib -Hussainpur link, 12 km from Rail Coach Factory (RCF) Kapurthala. Also 14 km from historical Gurdwara Ber Sahib Ji Sultanpur Lodhi.
