= Bhai Rupa =

- Town
- Location within Punjab
- Coordinates: 30°25′52″N 75°13′14″E
- Country: India
- State: Punjab
- District: Bathinda
- Founder: Baba Bhai Roop Chand Ji

Area
  - Total: 46 km^{2} (18 sq mi)

Population (2011)
  - Total: 16,561
  - Density: 360/km^{2} (930/sq mi)
- Demonym: Bhaike

Languages
  - Official: Punjabi
- Time zone: UTC+5:30 (IST)
- PIN: 151106
- Telephone code: 91-1651
- Website: www.bhairupa.org

Bhai Rupa is a town in the sub-division Rampura Phul and block Phul in the Bathinda district of the Punjab. It is part of Malwa region of Punjab which was granted town status in 2013. Geographically, it is bordered by Dyalpura Bhaika, and Jalal in the north, Gumti Kalan, Selwarah in the west, Burj Gill, and Dhapali in the south, Ghanda Banna, Chhana Gulab Singh Wala, and Dulewala town in the east. The town is divided into 13 wards and 3 Pattis (Kangar, Saanji Patti 1 and Saanji Patti 2).

Bhai Rupa is one of the unique villages/towns in Punjab where small area or cluster of streets are called " Agwarh".

== Foundation ==
On 1688 AD, the foundation of Bhai Rupa was laid with his-highness by 6th Guru, Sri Guru Hargobind Sahib ji. Gurudawa Mohari Sahib (foundation place), where 6th Guru drove with his arrow on that wood from Taklani (Jand sahib). Sixth Guru Sri Guru Hargobind Sahib ji tied the foundation of the village with his hands on the Land of Kangar village(small kingdom at that time), Bhai Rupa still has the name of Kangar in one of its localities.

== History ==
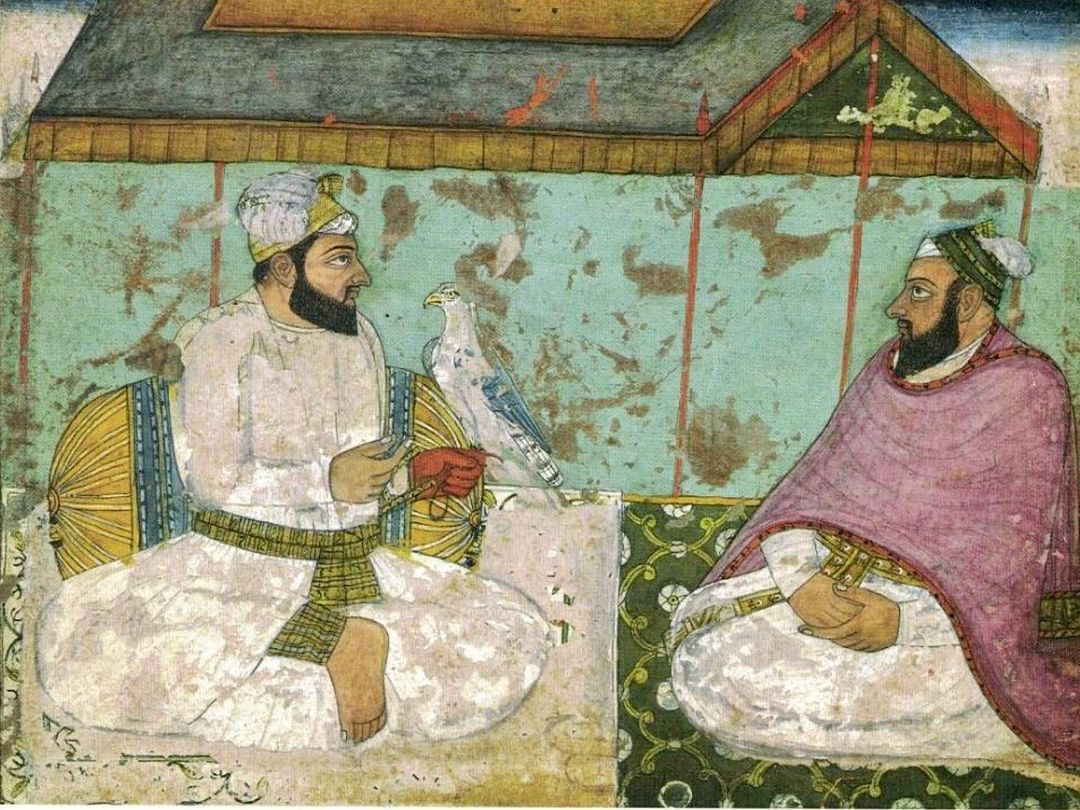
Depiction of Bhai Rupa (right) with Guru Hargobind (left)

Bhai Rupa was founded by Sri Guru Hargobind Sahib ji on 1688. Bhai Rupa is named after Baba Bhai Roop Chand ji. Before Independence, the village of Bhai Rupa was located in the four princely states of Patiala, Nabha, Bagdi and Bhadur. The village revenue was distributed among all these princely states while the criminal powers were vested in the Nabha princely state alone. It celebrates the name of a prominent Khokhar (some people say Rajput but descendants claim to be Ramgarhia and some claim to be Jatt Sikh)Sikh, Bhai Rupa (Roop Chand, 1614–1709), the son of Bhai Sadhu, who laid the foundation of the village in 1631, at the instance of Guru Hargobind. Next to Bhai Rupa's house, a gurdwara (Sikh community center) was built in Guru Hargobind's honour. The present Gurdwara Sahib Patshahi Chhevin, a two-storey domed building, marks that site inside the village. Guru ka Langar is across a narrow lane. In the same direction is the pavilion, raised recently to accommodate larger divans.

The Gurdwara, though affiliated to the Gurdwara Local Committee, BhaiRupa, is managed by the descendants of BhaiRupa. Close to the Gurdwara, in a private house belonging to one of the descendants of Bhai Rupa, there is preserved an old rath or chariot. It is said to have been brought from Dera Ram Rai at Dehra Dun by Bhai Gian Chand, a grandson of Bhai Roop Chand Ji. According to local tradition, it once belonged to Guru Arjan and was used by his successors, Guru Hargobind and Guru Har Rai.

== Historical Chariot (Rath Sahib) ==
There is also a historical chariot on which Mata Ganga Ji (wife of Sri Guru Arjan Dev Ji) went to seek the boon of her son from Baba Buddha Ji. After this Baba Ram Roy ji went to Delhi to meet Aurangzeb on it. As Ram Roy ji had no children, Bhai Gyan Chand (grandson of Bhai Roop Chand ji) was ordered to carry this chariot. In1744 AD on occasionof Sri Krishna Janmashtami this Chariot came to Bhai Rupa.

== The title of "Bhai" ==
The guru in recognition of devotion, honoured Roop Chand with the title of "bhai" (own brother) and put him in charge of the spiritual welfare of the new region of Malwa and the country south of Sutlej. With his own hands Guru Ji made Bhai Roop Chand the masand of the area and put on his forehead the tilaka, (saffron mark of leadership) and gave a karchha, a long spoon, asking him to run langar to feed the poor and the needy. This karchha is a symbol of veneration for the family. The guru also remarked that even fresh cut wood would burn like dry wood in the langar fire. This can be seen even now at Dyalpura Bhai village at any time.

== Notable places ==
There are various historic places to visit. Most of them are Sikh Religious places.

- Gurudwara Paatshahi 6th. google map link
- Gurudwara Rath Sahib. google map link
- Gurudwara Mohri Sahib (also Baba Bhai Roop Chand ji da ghar). google map link
- Gurudwara Mansrowar Sahib google map link.
- Gurudwara Baba Ladha ji. google map link
- Gurudwara Kale Bagh Paatshahi 6th. google map link
- ...many more

Bhai Rupa also have various Temples and Mosques.

== Education ==
There are five government and several private schools in this village

- Bhai Roop Chand Senior Secondary Public School
- Government Senior Secondary School Bhai Rupa,
- Government Girls Senior Secondary School Bhai Rupa
- Government Girls Elementary School Bhai Rupa
- Government Boys Elementary School Bhai Rupa
- Government Elementary School (Branch) Bhai Rupa
- Sunrise Public Senior Secondary School
- Summer Hill Public Senior Secondary School
- Guru Kul International Public School
- Hargobind Public School

== Facilities ==
=== Bus stands ===
- Main bus stand.
- Harpal Khokher bus stand
- Jalal bus stand
- Sailbrah bus stand
- Gumti bus stand
- Gate Wala bus stand ( locally called 'Chotta Adda'

=== Hospitals ===
- Primary Health Centre Bhai Rupa
- Veterinary Hospital Main Bazar (Dr. Sarbjit Singh)
- Many private hospitals

=== Other facilities ===
- Sh. Harpal Singh Khokhar library
- Bhai Ghnya Ji library

== Sewa kendra ==
- Bhai Rupa google maps link. For all government related works and documents.

Code PB-046-00244-U017 Type II, Address::Govt. Elementary School Bhai Rupa, Teh. Rampura Phul, Pin 151106.

== Connectivity of Bhai Rupa ==
Type	Status
Public Bus Service	Available within 10+ km distance and within town
Private Bus Service	Available within town
Railway Station	Available within 18+ km distance( Rampura Phul)

== See also ==
- Rampura Phul
- Bathinda
