= Bakhasar =

Bakhasar बाखासर
- village
- Interactive map of Bakhasar
- Coordinates: 24°46′N 71°7′E
- Country: India
- State: Rajasthan
- District: Barmer
- Tehsil: Sedwa

Area
  - Total: 5,701 ha (14,090 acres)

Population (2011)
  - Total: 5,120
  - Density: 89.8/km^{2} (233/sq mi)

Languages
  - Official: Hindi
- Time zone: UTC+5:30 (IST)
- ISO 3166 code: RJ-IN

Bakhasar is a village in the Barmer district of the Rajasthan state in India, which is not far from the border. Bakhasar is ruled by Nadola Chouhans, they are the main family of bakhasar village. Bakhasar has a total population of 5,120 people according to Census 2011.
