= Bagoda =

- Tehsil
- Country: India
- State: Rajasthan
- District: Jalore

Languages
  - Official: Marwari , Hindi
- Time zone: UTC+5:30 (IST)
- PIN: 343032

Bagoda is a village in Jalore district of Rajasthan. It is the headquarters of tehsil by the same name. It has a population of approximately 130,000 and consists of 55 Villages.

== Notable personalities ==
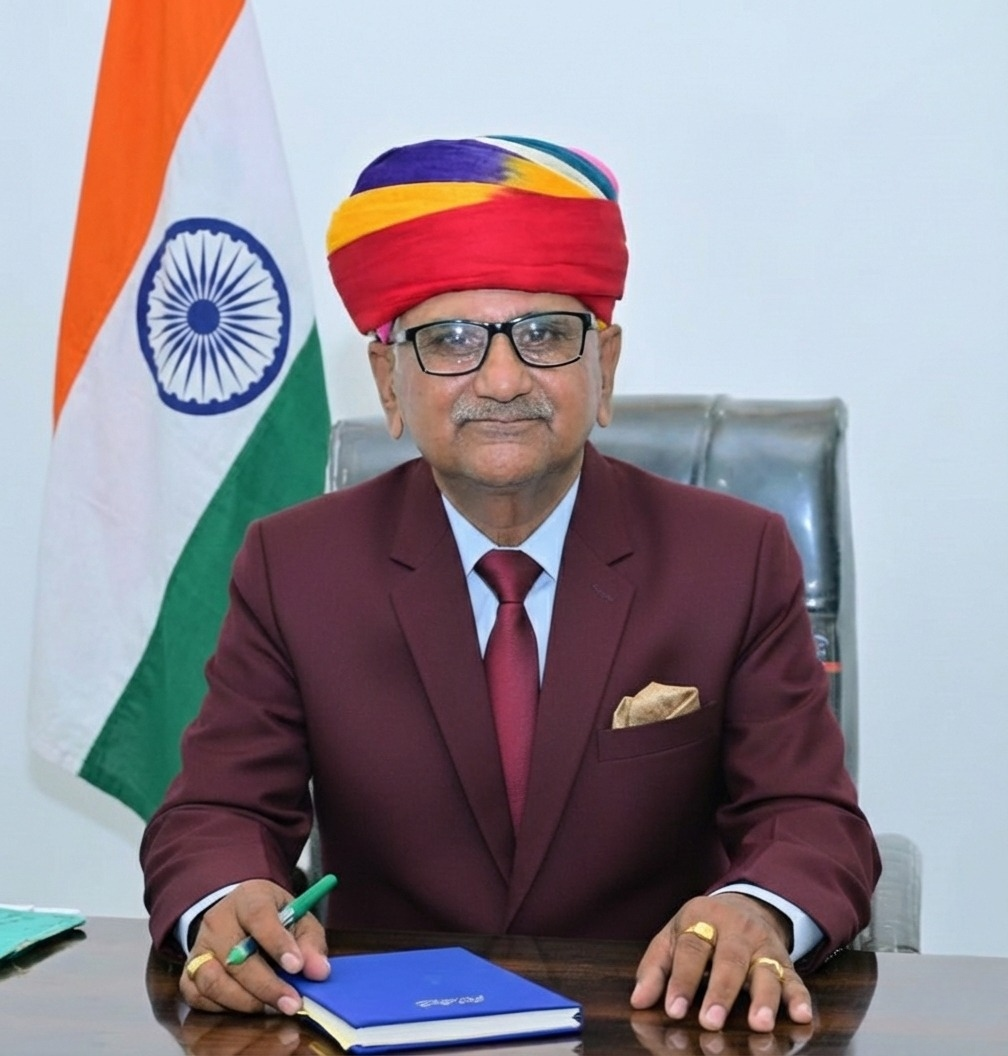
Joraram Choudhary the district president of Vishva Hindu Parishad (VHP) for Bhinmal unit in Jalor district.

- Joraram Choudhary: A prominent social leader and Formal Principal of Government Senior Secondary School (GSSS), Bagoda. He currently serves as the District President of Vishva Hindu Parishad (VHP) for the Bhinmal unit and the Tehsil President of the Pensioners' Union. He is also the Director of Chanakya Academy in Bagoda and an active leader in the Bharatiya Kissan Sangh, working towards youth empowerment and drug-free society initiatives.
