= Rajaldesar =

Town/sub district Churu in Rajasthan, India

Rajaldesar Dharti Dhora Ree
- Town/sub district[churu]
- Nickname: Rajana
- Location in Rajasthan, India
- Coordinates: 28.03°N 74.47°E
- Country: India
- State: Rajasthan
- District: Churu
- Elevation: 313 m (1,027 ft)

Population (2015)
  - Total: 44,385

Languages
  - Official: Hindi & Marwadi
- Time zone: UTC+5:30 (IST)
- PIN: 331802
- Telephone code: 01567
- Vehicle registration: RJ-44

Rajaldesar is a City and a Tehsil in Churu District in the Indian State of Rajasthan. Rajaldesar is well connected through Indian Railways and National Highway 11 (India) also. Rajaldesar is famously known for its traditional folk-dance Ghindar which is played by male performers with a stick around the festival of Holi .

== Geography ==
Rajaldesar is located at 28.03°N 74.47°E. It has an Average Elevation of 318 Metres (1026 Feet).

Temperature of the region in Winter is about -1 °C to 10 °C and in Summer 25 °C to 47 °C.

== Demographics ==
As of 2001 India Census, Rajaldesar had a Population of 44,385. Males constitute 51% of the Population and Females 49%. Rajaldesar has an Average Literacy Rate of 55%, lower than the National Average of 59.5%: Male Literacy is 60%, and Female Literacy is 36%. In Rajaldesar, 19% of the population is under 6 Years of Age. The name of this Village is on Bikaner's ruler His Highness Gangbahadur Maharaja Ganga Singh's Mother Rajal Bai.
