= Bap, Rajasthan =

Bap
- City
- Interactive map of Bap
- Country: India
- State: Rajasthan
- District: Phalodi
- Tehsil: Bap Tehsil
- Time zone: UTC+5:30 (IST)

Bap (Baap) also known as Bhap is a Municipalitiy, located in the Phalodi District of Rajasthan state in Western India. It is nearby Phalodi city. It is a Panchayat Samiti as well as being the Tehsil headquarters for Bap Tehsil. It is a rapidly developing City.

== History ==
Prior to becoming the headquarters of the then newly created Bap Tehsil in 2011, Bap was part of Phalodi Tehsil; but was still the center for the local area with a local council (panchayat samiti), which was treated as an independent Sub-Tehsil. Bap village is also very religious place. Madhuri Dixit and Huma Qureshi also came to this village for shooting their movie Dedh Ishqiya.

== Demographics ==
In the Census of India 2001, the village of Bap had a population of 8,890. Males constituted 4,717 of the population and females 4,173. The gender ratio is 885 females per thousand males.
