= Pacheri =

- village
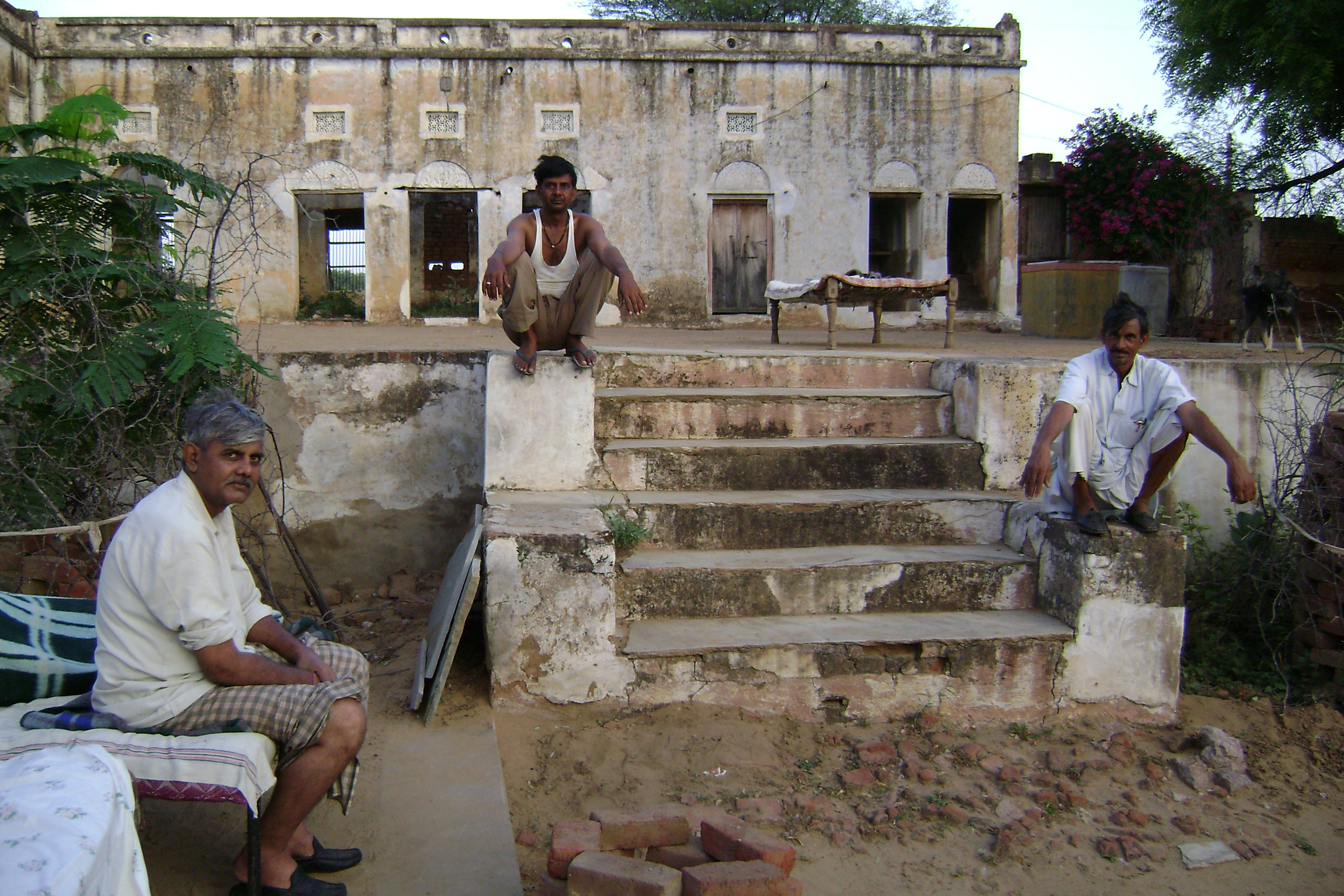
- Pacheri Fort

- Location in Rajasthan, India Pacheri (India)
- Coordinates: 28.1500°N 75.9333°E
- Country: India
- State: Rajasthan
- District: Jhunjhunu
- Elevation: 958 m (3,143 ft)

Population (2011)
  - Total: 3,974

Languages
  - Official: Hindi
- Time zone: UTC+5:30 (IST)
- ISO 3166 code: IN-RJ

Pacheri is a village in the state of Rajasthan, India. It has a population of over 3974 residents.

== Geography ==
Pacheri is located at 28.15°N 75.93°E. It has an average elevation of 291 metres (958 feet).
