= Buhana =

Buhana बुहाना
- Town
- Buhana
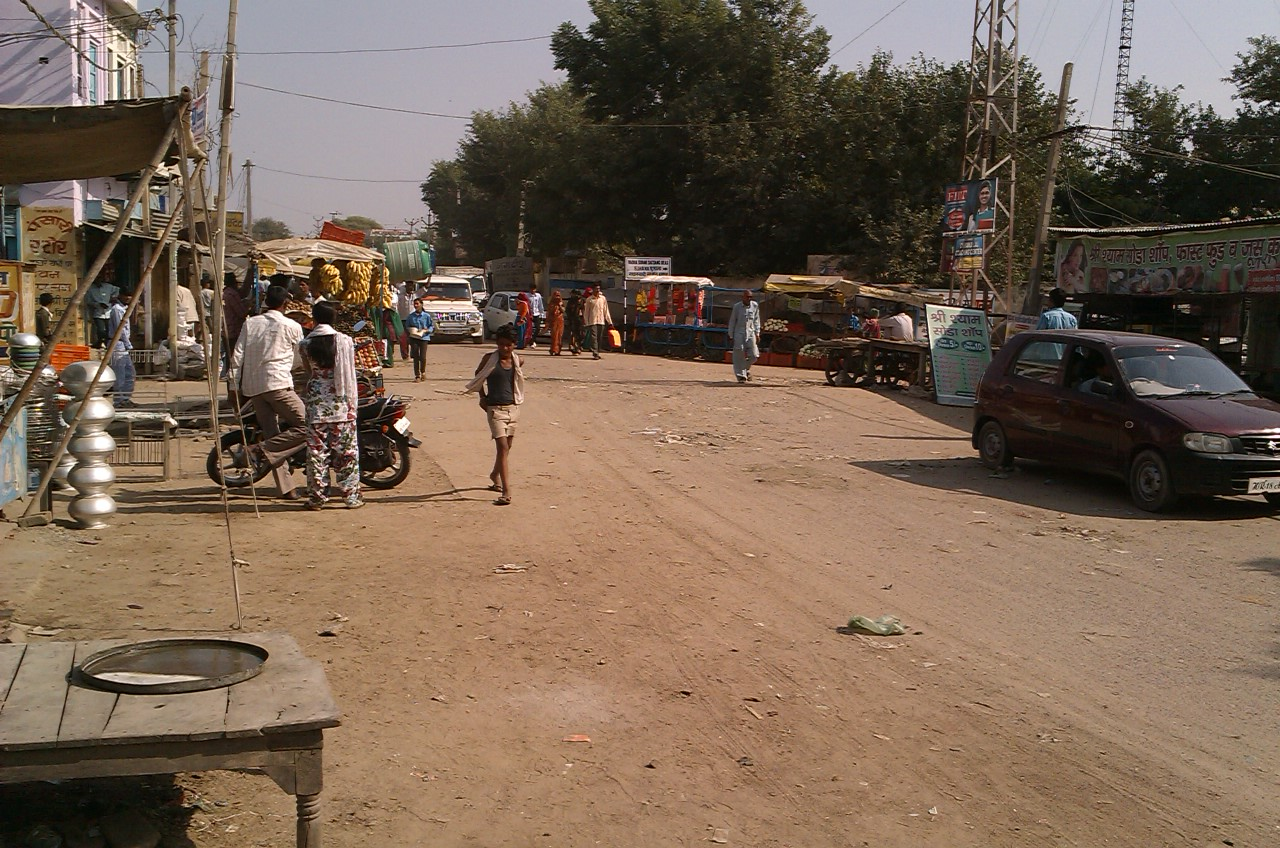

- Location in Rajasthan, India
- Coordinates: 28.2052257°N 75.8779764°E
- Country: India
- State: Rajasthan
- District: Jhunjhunu
- Founder: Chandravanshi Thakur Bhawani Singh Tanwar

Government
  - Type: Local Government
  - Body: NAGAR PALIKA

Area
  - Total: 34.76 km^{2} (13.42 sq mi)
- Elevation: 338 m (1,109 ft)

Population (2011)
  - Total: 10,495
  - Density: 301.9/km^{2} (782.0/sq mi)
- Demonym: Tanwarawati

Languages
  - Official: Tanwarawati(rajasthani and haryanvi) & Hindi
- Time zone: UTC+5:30 (IST)
- PIN: 333502
- Area code: +91-1593
- ISO 3166 code: RJ-IN
- Vehicle registration: RJ - 53, RJ 18,HR 34

Buhana is a tehsil (sub-district) and a municipality in the Jhunjhunu district of the Indian state of Rajasthan.

== History ==
The village was founded by Thakur Bhawani Singh Tanwar. (Who are the descendants of Arjuna, son of Pandu). The village was named Buhana after Bhawani Singh Tanwar. The rulers of Buhana village were Tanwar Rajputs, who still reside in Buhana in large numbers today. Buhana is known as the 'mine of army soldiers' . The language spoken here is Tanwarawati (Rajasthani and Haryanvi).People of almost all communities live together harmoniously in Buhana.There is a highly renowned temple dedicated to Baba Umad Singh Ji in Buhana; people travel from far and wide to visit it. Baba Umad Singh Tanwar is a folk deity of Buhana, revered by people of all faiths.

== Main sights ==
Religious buildings

Buhana is an ancient devotional land. There are many holy hermitages (Ashrams): Dhoona Dhaloda and Lihlay. There are also many temples: Shree baba umad singh Tanwar mandir ,Ram Janki Mandir, Radhakrishna Mandir, Khemka Kuldevi Mandir, Shikharband Mandir, Tanwar 24 Ka Mandir(Thakur ji), Dakshinmukhi Balaji Mandir, and Maharana Wali Devi Mandir. The Pabuji ka Devara, built by the Raika community of Buhana about 200 years ago, is a live example of secularism where all the gods and goddesses of Hinduism, Peer Baba Mazar in Badbar (Muslims) and Crist Chabutra (Christians) are present. Both worship places, i.e., Baba Umad Singh ki Medi and Pabuji ka Devara, are still devoted places of worship by Hindus and Muslims. A piece of Gau-char bhoomi called bani measuring about 18,000 bighas under gram panchayat Buhana is a place for wildlife preservation that provides a livelihood to all communities of cattle breeders and a pollution-free environment to its surroundings. It is also available in Indian history that this Bani was a part of Chiman Rishi Ashram, which was located on Doshi mountain (Haryana), hardly 20 km away, and the famous brand of medicines still in existence, i.e., Chimanprass, was invented out of herbal plants of this Bani, which was a part of that Ashram, and also, the Pandavas of Mahabharat have spent a few days in this Bani. It has huge possibilities to develop a tourist place specially for wildlife lovers and herbal medicinal practitioners. Another secular place is Gogaji ki medi, which is well known as the god of snakes. Indeed, the Bani, Devra, and both Medi are the pride of Buhana. Recently, a Khadesari Baba has also made his presence in the bani for providing a supper Gaushala and a decent Asharam for the followers.

== Personalities ==
- Baba Umad Singh (19th century), Hindu spiritual leader
