= National Highway 25 (India) =

National Highway in India

National Highway 25
- Map of National Highway 25 in red

Route information
- Length: 483 km (300 mi)

Major junctions
- From: Munabao; India; N-120 Highway
- To: Beawar

Location
- Country: India
- States: Rajasthan

Highway system
- Roads in India; Expressways; National; State; Asian
← NH 112	→ NH 14

National Highway 25 (NH 25) is a National Highway in India that connects Barmer and Beawar in the state of Rajasthan. It has recently been widened to four lanes by the National Highways Authority of India.

== Route ==
Munabao, Ramsar, Barmer, Kawas, Baytu, Madhasar, Dhudhwa, Bagundi, kher, Tilwara, Balotra, Pachpadra, Kalyanpur, Jodhpur, Kaparda, Bilara, Jaitaran, Bar, Beawar. nh25

== Junctions ==
Terminal with National Highway 70 near Munabao.

Junction with National Highway 925 near Gagriya.

Junction with National Highway 68 near Barmer.

Junction with National Highway 325 near Balotra.

Terminal with National Highway 58 near Beawar.

== See also ==
- List of national highways in India
- List of national highways in India by state
