= Singhana, Rajasthan =

Singhana
- Municipal Town
- Location in Rajasthan, India
- Coordinates: 27.98°N 75.8°E
- Country: India
- State: Rajasthan
- District: Jhunjhunu

Government
  - Type: Municipality
  - Body: Singhana Municipal Board
- Elevation: 3,000 m (9,800 ft)

Population
  - Total: 25,000+

Languages
  - Official: Hindi
- Time zone: UTC+5:30 (IST)
- PIN: 333516
- Telephone code: 01593
- Vehicle registration: RJ18
- Website: http://jhunjhunu.rajasthan.gov.in/

Singhana is a municipal town with (sub-tehsil) in Jhunjhunu district of Shekhawati region in Rajasthan state of India.

== Geography ==
Singhana is situated in Jhunjhunu, Rajasthan, India. Its geographical coordinates are 28° 5'N, 75° 50'E. It is located 60 km east of Jhunjhunu, 13 km from Buhana, 165 km from Jaipur the state capital and 180 km from the national capital, Delhi.

== Demographics ==
Most residents are involved in commercial trade and farming. Hindi and Shekhawati are the spoken languages.

== Education ==
=== Colleges in Singhana ===
- Arya PG College
- New Eden Mahila Mahavidyalaya Singhana
- Naresh Kanya Mahavidyalaya Singhana
- Saraswati Pg College Buhana
- Satguru T.T College Singhana
- Sharwani Jhajharia Institute of Education
- Shri Krishan Shiksha Samiti, Singhana
- Vishwa Bharti B.ed College, Singhana

=== Schools in Singhana ===
1. Shree Krishna kids school singhana
- Kendriya Vidyalaya School, Khetri, Nagar
- Mahatma Gandhi Govt English School Makro
- Mahatma Gandhi Govt English School, Singhana
- Govt Sr Sec School Khetri Nagar
- Cambridge Sr.Sec. school Singhana
- New Singhana Academy Sr.Sec.School Singhana.
- Anuj Public Sr. Sec. School, Singhana.
- Deshraj public school near Saray Mohalla
- Vishwa Bharti Sr. Sec. School, Singhana
- Geeta Public Sr. Sec. School, Singhana
- New Indian Public Sr. Sec. School, Singhana
- Central Public Secondary School, Singhana
- Ravindra Academy High School, Singhana
- Oxford Public School, Singhana
- Govt Upper Primary School, Banwas
- Santa Kids Play School, Banwas
- Mata Shravani International School, Singhana
- Bachpan Play School / The Sanskaar Valley School, Singhana

== Healthcare And Banks ==
=== Hospitals ===
• Govt Hospital of Singhana, Rajasthan.

• Rajani Ayush homoeopathic Hospital.

• Kiran Hospital.

• Community Health Center.

• Raj Hospital And Fracture Clinic.

• Chakrapani Hospital.

• Aayush Child & Dental Hospital.

• KK hospital singhana ( dr.kishanlal)

=== Banks ===
- State Bank Of India.
- ICICI Bank.
- Central Bank of India.
- HDFC Bank.
- Bank of Baroda.
- Punjab National Bank.
- IDFC First Bank.
