= National Highway 125 (India) =

Indian National Highway

National Highway 125
- Map of National Highway 125 in red

Route information
- Length: 177 km (110 mi)

Major junctions
- From: Jodhpur
- To: Pokaran

Location
- Country: India
- States: Rajasthan
- Primary destinations: Balesar, Dechu

Highway system
- Roads in India; Expressways; National; State; Asian
← NH 114	→ NH 125

National Highway 125 (NH 125) is a National Highway in India. This highway connects Jodhpur, Balesar, Dechu, Pokaran in the state of Rajasthan.
