= National Highway 68 (India) =

National highway in India

National Highway 68
- Map of National Highway 68 in red

Route information
- Length: 689.88 km (428.67 mi)

Major junctions
- From: Tanot
- To: Prantij

Location
- Country: India
- States: Gujarat, Rajasthan

Highway system
- Roads in India; Expressways; National; State; Asian
← NH 70	→ NH 48

NH 68 is a highway in India starting from its junction with NH-70 near Tanot connecting Ramgarh, Bhadasar, Jaisalmer, Barmer, Sanchor in the State of Rajasthan, Tharad, Bhabar, Radhanpur, Kamalpur, Khakhal, Roda, Dunawada, Patan, Chanasma, Mahesana, Kherva, Gojariya, Sama, Churada, Kuvadara and terminating at its junction with NH-48 near Prantij in the State of Gujarat.
