= List of national highways in India =

Schematic map of national highways in India

On 28 April 2010, the Ministry of Road Transport and Highways officially published a new numbering system for the National Highway network in the Gazette of the Government of India. It is a systematic numbering scheme based on the orientation and the geographic location of the highway. This was adopted to ensure more flexibility and consistency in the numbering of existing and new national highways.

As per the new numbering system:

- All north-south oriented highways will have even numbers increasing from the east to the west.
- All east-west oriented highways will have odd numbers increasing from the north to the south.
- All major highways will be single digit or double digit in number.
- Three-digit numbered highways are secondary routes or branches of a main highway. The secondary route number is prefixed to the number of the main highway. For example 244, 344 etc. will be the branches of the main NH44.
- Suffixes A, B, C, D etc. are added to the three-digit sub highways to indicate very small spin-offs or stretches of sub-highways.

== List of national highways ==
=== Primary national highways ===
Number	Origin	Terminus	State/UT	Region	Length
NH 1	Uri	Leh	Jammu and Kashmir, Ladakh	North India	541 km (336 mi)
NH 2	Dibrugarh	Tuipang	Assam, Nagaland, Manipur, Mizoram	Northeast India	1,408 km (875 mi)
NH 3	Attari (India-Pakistan) Border	Leh	Punjab, Himachal Pradesh, Ladakh	North India	883 km (549 mi)
NH 4	Saddle peak check post	Chidya Tapu View point	Andaman and Nicobar Islands	Indian Ocean	333 km (207 mi)
NH 5	India-Pakisan Border	India-China Border	Punjab, Chandigarh, Haryana, Himachal Pradesh	North India	700 km (430 mi)
NH 6	Jorabat	Zokhawthar	Meghalaya, Assam, Mizoram	Northeast India	676 km (420 mi)
NH 7	Fazilka	Mana Pass	Punjab, Haryana, Himachal Pradesh, Uttarakhand	North India	854 km (531 mi)
NH 8	Karimganj	Maitri Setu	Assam, Tripura	Northeast India	375 km (233 mi)
NH 9	Fazilka	Jauljibi	Punjab, Haryana, Delhi, Uttar Pradesh, Uttarakhand	North India	954 km (593 mi)
NH 10	Siliguri	Nathu La	West Bengal, Sikkim	Northeast India	174 km (108 mi)
NH 11	Rewari	Myajlar	Haryana, Rajasthan	North India	848 km (527 mi)
NH 12	Bakkhali	Raiganj	West Bengal	East India	625 km (388 mi)
NH 13	Tawang	Wakro	Arunachal Pradesh	Northeast India	1,559 km (969 mi)
NH 14	Kharagpur	Morgram	West Bengal	East India	324 km (201 mi)
NH 15	Baihata	Wakro	Assam, Arunachal Pradesh	Northeast India	666 km (414 mi)
NH 16	Chennai	Kolkata	Tamil Nadu, Andhra Pradesh, Odisha, West Bengal	South India, East India	1,722 km (1,070 mi)
NH 17	Guwahati	Sevoke	Assam, West Bengal	Northeast India	576 km (358 mi)
NH 18	Koderma	Balasore	Jharkhand, West Bengal, Odisha	East India	594 km (369 mi)
NH 19	Agra	Dankuni	Uttar Pradesh, Bihar, Jharkhand, West Bengal	North India, East India	1,369 km (851 mi)
NH 20	Bakhtiyarpur	Panikoili	Bihar, Jharkhand, Odisha	East India	729 km (453 mi)
NH 21	Jaipur	Bareilly	Rajasthan, Uttar Pradesh	North India	502 km (312 mi)
NH 22	Sonbarsa	Chandwa	Bihar, Jharkhand	East India	450 km (280 mi)
NH 23	Kothun	Udi MorEtawah	Rajasthan Uttar Pradesh	North India	366 km (227 mi)
NH 24	Sonauli	Saiyad Raja	Uttam Pradesh	North India	298 km (185 mi)
NH 25	Munabao	Beawar	Rajasthan	North India	484 km (301 mi)
NH 26	Vizianagaram	Bargarh	Andhra Pradesh, Odisha	South India, East India	555 km (345 mi)
NH 27	Porbandar	Silchar	Gujarat, Rajasthan, Madhya Pradesh, Uttar Pradesh, Bihar, West Bengal, Assam	West to Northeast India	3,507 km (2,179 mi)
NH 28	Chunar	Kakrahwa	Uttar Pradesh	North India	358 km (222 mi)
NH 29	Dabaka	Jessami	Assam, Nagaland, Manipur	Northeast India	340 km (210 mi)
NH 30	Vijayawada	Sitarganj	Uttarakhand, Uttar Pradesh, Madhya Pradesh, Chhattisgarh, Telangana, Andhra Pradesh	North to South India	2,025 km (1,258 mi)
NH 31	Unnao	Gazole	Uttar Pradesh, Bihar, West Bengal	North India, East India	992 km (616 mi)
NH 32	Chennai	Thoothukudi	Tamil Nadu, Puducherry	South India	657 km (408 mi)
NH 33	Arwal	Farakka	Bihar, Jharkhand, West Bengal	East India	462.25 km (287.23 mi)
NH 34	Gangotri Dham	Lakhnadon	Uttarakhand, Uttar Pradesh, Madhya Pradesh	North, Central India	1,521 km (945 mi)
NH 35	Harpalpur	Varanasi	Uttar Pradesh	North India	462.25 km (287.23 mi)
NH 36	Vikravandi	Manamadurai	Tamil Nadu	South India	343 km (213 mi)
NH 37	Karimganj	Imphal	Assam, Manipur	North East India	361 km (224 mi)
NH 38	Vellore	Thoothukudi	Tamil Nadu	South India	625 km (388 mi)
NH 39	Jhansi	Ranchi	Uttar Pradesh, Madhya Pradesh, Jharkhand	North, East India	900 km (560 mi)
NH 40	Kurnool	Ranipettai	Andhra Pradesh, Tamil Nadu	South India	414 km (257 mi)
NH 41	Samakhiyali	Narayan Sarovar	Gujarat	West India	300 km (190 mi)
NH 42	Joladarasi	Krishnagiri	Karnataka, Andhra Pradesh, Tamil Nadu	South India	425 km (264 mi)
NH 43	Gulluganj	Chaibasa	Madhya Pradesh, Chhattisgarh, Jharkhand	Central to East India	961 km (597 mi)
NH 44	Srinagar	Kanyakumari	Jammu and Kashmir, Himachal Pradesh, Punjab, Haryana, Uttar Pradesh, Madhya Pradesh, Maharashtra, Telangana, Andhra Pradesh, Karnataka, Tamil Nadu	North to South India	4,225 km (2,625 mi)
NH 45	Obedullaganj	Bilaspur	Madhya Pradesh, Chhattisgarh	Central India	676 km (420 mi)
NH 46	Gwalior	Betul	Madhya Pradesh	Central India	650 km (400 mi)
NH 47	Bamanbore	Nagpur	Gujarat, Madhya Pradesh, Maharashtra	Central India, West India	1,089 km (677 mi)
NH 48	Delhi	Chennai	Delhi, Haryana, Rajasthan, Gujarat, Maharashtra, Karnataka, Tamil Nadu	North to South India	2,916 km (1,812 mi)
NH 49	Bilaspur	Kharagpur	Chhattishgarh, Odisha, Jharkhand, West Bengal	Central India, East India	700 km (430 mi)
NH 50	Nanded	Chitradurga	Maharashtra, Karnataka	West India, South India	766 km (476 mi)
NH 51	Dwarka	Dhrangadhra	Gujarat	West India	790 km (490 mi)
NH 52	Sangru	Ankola	Punjab, Haryana, Rajasthan, Madhya Pradesh, Maharashtra, Karnataka	North to South India	2,401 km (1,492 mi)
NH 53	Hajira	Paradip Port	Gujarat, Maharashtra, Chhattisgarh, Odisha	West India to East India	1,849 km (1,149 mi)
NH 54	Pathankot	Bikaner	Punjab, Haryana, Rajasthan	North India	684 km (425 mi)
NH 55	Paradeep	Sambalpur	Odisha	East India	350 km (220 mi)
NH 56	Nimbahera	Vapi	Rajasthan, Gujarat	North India to West India	715 km (444 mi)
NH 57	Balangir	Khordha	Odisha	East India	300 km (190 mi)
NH 58	Fatehpur	Palanpur	Rajasthan, Gujarat	North India to West India	697 km (433 mi)
NH 59	Khariar	Brahmapur	Odisha	East India	352 km (219 mi)
NH 60	Pune	Dhule	Maharashtra	West India	414 km (257 mi)
NH 61	Bhiwandi	Jagtial	Maharashtra, Telangana	West India to South India	814 km (506 mi)
NH 62	Abohar	Pindwara	Punjab, Rajasthan	North India	784 km (487 mi)
NH 63	Daund	Koraput	Maharashtra, Telangana, Chhattisgarh, Odisha	West India to East India	1,065 km (662 mi)
NH 64	Morbi	Hazira	Gujarat	West India	528 km (328 mi)
NH 65	Pune	Machilipatnam	Maharashtra, Karnataka, Telangana, Andhra Pradesh	West India to South India	926 km (575 mi)
NH 66	Navi Mumbai	Kanyakumari	Maharashtra, Goa, Karnataka, Kerala, Tamil Nadu	West India to South India	1,681 km (1,045 mi)
NH 67	Krishnapatnam Port	Ramanagara	Andhra Pradesh, Karnataka	South India	814 km (506 mi)
NH 68	Tanot	Prantij	Rajasthan, Gujarat	North India to West India	729 km (453 mi)
NH 69	Honnavar	Renigunta	Andhra Pradesh, Karnataka	South India	750 km (470 mi)
NH 70	Munabao	Tanot	Rajasthan	North India	343 km (213 mi)
NH 71	Madanapalle	Naidupeta	Andhra Pradesh	South India	190.6 km (118.4 mi)
NH 72 (present before 2010)	Hiriyur	Cherkala	Karnataka, Kerala	South India	404 km (251 mi)
NH 73	Mangaluru	Tumakuru	Karnataka	South India	324 km (201 mi)
NH 74 (present before 2010)	Birur	Raichur	Karnataka	South India	459 km (285 mi)
NH 75	Bantval	Katpadi	Karnataka, Andhra Pradesh, Tamil Nadu	South India	567 km (352 mi)
NH 76 (present before 2010)	Guntakal	Gadag	Andhra Pradesh, Karnataka	South India	276 km (171 mi)
NH 77	Krishnagiri	Tindivanam	Tamil Nadu	South India	196 km (122 mi)
NH 78 (present before 2010)	Naraharipeta	Anchetty	Tamil Nadu	South India	260 km (160 mi)
NH 79	Mettur Dam	Ulundurpettai	Tamil Nadu	South India	196 km (122 mi)
NH 80 (present before 2010)	Sayalgudi	Thiruvarur	Tamil Nadu	South India	265 km (165 mi)
NH 81	Coimbatore	Chidambaram	Tamil Nadu	South India	324 km (201 mi)
NH 82 (present before 2010)	Parthibanur	Tiruchendur	Tamil Nadu	South India	298 km (185 mi)
NH 83	Coimbatore	Nagapattinam	Tamil Nadu	South India	389 km (242 mi)
NH 84 (present before 2010)	Avinashi	Kumily	Tamil Nadu, Kerala	South India	256 km (159 mi)
NH 85	Kochi	Thondi	Kerala, Tamil Nadu	South India	484 km (301 mi)
NH 86 (present before 2010)	Mimisal	Rasipuram	Tamil Nadu	South India	289 km (180 mi)
NH 87	Manamadurai	Dhanushkodi	Tamil Nadu	South India	180 km (110 mi)
NH 88 (present before 2010)	Kottayam	Nagercoil	Kerala, Tamil Nadu	South India	260 km (160 mi)

=== Highways proposed to be reinstated ===
Number	Origin	Terminus	State/UT	Region	Length
NH 72 (present before 2010)	Hiriyur	Cherkala	Karnataka, Kerala	South India	404 km (251 mi)
NH 74 (present before 2010)	Birur	Raichur	Karnataka	South India	459 km (285 mi)
NH 76 (present before 2010)	Guntakal	Gadag	Andhra Pradesh, Karnataka	South India	276 km (171 mi)
NH 78 (present before 2010)	Naraharipeta	Anchetty	Tamil Nadu	South India	260 km (160 mi)
NH 80 (present before 2010)	Sayalgudi	Thiruvarur	Tamil Nadu	South India	265 km (165 mi)
NH 82 (present before 2010)	Parthibanur	Tiruchendur	Tamil Nadu	South India	298 km (185 mi)
NH 84 (present before 2010)	Avinashi	Kumily	Tamil Nadu, Kerala	South India	256 km (159 mi)
NH 86 (present before 2010)	Mimisal	Rasipuram	Tamil Nadu	South India	289 km (180 mi)
NH 88 (present before 2010)	Kottayam	Nagercoil	Kerala, Tamil Nadu	South India	260 km (160 mi)

=== Spur national highways ===
List of national highways of India sorted by highway number
Primary NH no.	Secondary NH no.	Route	States	Length	
Primary NH no.	Secondary NH no.	Route	States	km	mi
NH 1		Uri, Baramulla, Srinagar, Kargil and Leh	Jammu and Kashmir	422	262
NH 1	NH 301	NH1 near Kargil, Zanskar Road	Jammu and Kashmir	228.1	141.7
NH 1	NH 501	Junction with NH1, Panchtarni, Chandanwari, Pahalgam, Batakut, Martand, NH244 near Khanabal	Jammu and Kashmir	51	32
NH 1	NH 701	NH1 near Baramulla, Watergam Rafiabad, Kupwara, Tangdhar	Jammu and Kashmir	130.1	80.8
NH 1	NH 701A	Starting from its junction with NH-1 near Baramula and terminating at Gulmarg in the state of Jammu and Kashmir	Jammu and Kashmir	34.3	21.3
NH 2		NH 15 near Dibrugarh, Sivasagar, Amguri, Mokokchung, Wokha, Kohima, Imphal, Churachandpur, Seling, Serchhip, Lawngtla, Tuipang	Assam, Nagaland, Manipur, Mizoram	1,214	754
NH 2	102	(NH39) NH2 near Imphal, Moreh	Manipur	107	66
NH 2	102A	NH2 near Tadubi, Paomata, Ukhrul, Phungyar, Kasom Khullen, Kampang, NH102 near Thengnoupal	Manipur	353.8	219.8
NH 2	102B	NH2 near Churachandpur, Singhat, Sinzawl, Tuivai Road, Myanmar Road, Seling	Manipur, Mizoram	256.7	159.5
NH 2	102C	NH102 near Palel, Chandel	Manipur	15.8	9.8
NH 2	202	(NH155) NH2 near Mokokchung, Tuensang, Sampurre, Meluri, (NH150) Jessami, Ukhrul, NH2 near Imphal	Nagaland, Manipur	460	290
NH 2	302	(NH54A) NH2 near Therait, Lunglei	Mizoram	10	6.2
NH 2	502	(NH54B) NH2 near Venus Saddle, Saiha	Mizoram	23	14
NH 2	502A	Lawngtlai, Myanmar Border (Kaladan road)	Mizoram	74.3	46.2
NH 2	702	NH2 near Chantongia, Longling, Lonhching, Mon, Lapa, Tizit, Sonari, NH215 near Sapekhati	Nagaland, Assam	187.9	116.8
NH 2	702A	NH2 near Mokokchung, Zunheboto, Phek, NH29 near Jessam	Nagaland, Manipur	169.2	105.1
NH 2	702B	NH2 near Longling, NH202 near Tuensang	Nagaland	62.7	39.0
NH 2	702C	NH2 near Sibasagar, Simalguri, NH702 near Sonari	Assam	45.8	28.5
NH 2	702D	NH2 near Mokokchung, Mariami, NH715 near Jorhat	Nagaland, Assam	101.0	62.8
NH 3		(NH1) Atari, Amritsar, (NH70) Jalandhar, Hoshiarpur, Nadaun, Hamirpur, Tauni Devi, Awa Devi, (NH21) Mandi, Kullu, Manali, Leh	Punjab, Himachal Pradesh, Jammu and Kashmir	888	552
NH 3	103	(NH88) NH3 near Hamirpur, Bhota, Ghumarwain, NH154 near Ghaghas	Himachal Pradesh	58	36
NH 3	103A/344A	NH3 near Hoshiarpur, Mahalpur, Gurhshankar, Nawanshahr, Balachur, NH205 near Rupnagar See notes	Punjab	105.1	65.3
NH 3	303	(NH20A) NH154 near Nagrota, (NH88) Daulatur, Ranital, Jawalamukhi, NH3 near Nadaun	Himachal Pradesh	70.4	43.7
NH 3	503	(NH88) Mcleodganj, Dharamshala, Mataur, Kangra, (NH20A) Ranital, Dera Gopipur, NH3 near Mubarakpur, Amb, Una, Dehlan, Anandpur Sahib, Kiratpur, NH205	Himachal Pradesh, Punjab	180.2	112.0
NH 3	503A	NH3 near Amritsar, Mehta, Sri Hargobindpur, Tanda, Hoshiarpur, NH503 near Una	Himachal Pradesh, Punjab	142.4	88.5
NH 3	703	(NH71) NH44 near Jalandhar, Nakodar, Shahkot, Moga, Badhni, Barnala, Mansa, Jhunir, Shardulgarh NH9 near Sirsa	Punjab, Haryana	256	159
NH 3	703A	NH703A near Jalandhar, Kapurthala, Sultanpur Lodhi, Pindi, Makhu, Mallawala, Llwewala, NH354 near Arifke	Punjab	101	63
NH 3	703AA	NH-703A near Kapurthala connecting Gobindwal Sahib and terminating at its junction with NH-54 near Tarn Taran	Punjab		
NH 3	703B	Junction with NH-703 near Moga connecting Harike and terminating at Khalra in the state of Punjab	Punjab	75.167	46.707
NH 4		Diglipur, Mayabandar, Desharatpur, Baratang, Ferrargunj, Tusnabad, Garacharama, Sri Vijayapuram (Port Blair), Chiriyatapu, Munda Pahad	Andaman & Nicobar	334	208
NH 4	104	Collinpur (Kalipur) connecting NH4 at Tusnabad, Manglutan, Sunset Point (Amber Beach), Garacharama, Airport, Viper Island	Andaman & Nicobar	56.4	35.0
NH 4	204	Wandoor Beach connecting NH4 at Manglutan, Tusnabad, Ferrargunj, Wimberlygunj, Shoal Bay	Andaman & Nicobar	54.2	33.7
NH 4	304	Radhanagar Beach connecting Swaraj Dweep	Andaman & Nicobar	23	14
NH 4	504	Little Andaman, Indira Bazar	Andaman & Nicobar	27.7	17.2
NH 5		(NH95) Firozpur, Moga, Jagraon, Ludhiana, (NH21) Kharar, (NH22) Chandigarh, Kalka, Solan, Shimla, Theog, Narkanda, Kumarsain, Rampur, Chini, Shipkila	Punjab, Chandigarh, Haryana, Himachal Pradesh	729	453
NH 5	105	(NH21A) NH5 near Pinjore, Baddi, Nalagarh, NH205 near Swarghat	Himachal Pradesh, Punjab, Haryana	67	42
NH 5	105B	NH5 near Dhillon Nagar (Moga), Bagh Purana (NH254), NH54 near Baja Khana	Punjab	38.411	23.867
NH 5	205	(NH21) Kharar Ropar, Swarghat, (NH88) Nauni, Darlaghat, NH5 near Shimla	Himachal Pradesh, Punjab	183	114
NH 5	205A	Kharar, Banur, NH44 near Tepla	Punjab	40	25
NH 5	305	NH5 near Aut, Banjar, Ani, Luhri, NH5 near Sainj	Himachal Pradesh	96.6	60.0
NH 5	505	NH5 near Khab Sangam, Chango, Sumdo, Tabo, Attargo, Kaza, Morang, Hanse, Losar, Lachu, Chhota Dhara, NH3 near Gramphoo	Himachal Pradesh	282	175
NH 5	505A	NH5 near Powari, Reckong Peo, Kalpa	Himachal Pradesh	20	12
NH 5	705	NH5 near Theog, Kotkhai, Jubbal, NH707 near Hatkoti	Himachal Pradesh	74	46
NH 6		(NH40) N 27 near Jorabat, (NH44) Shillong, (NH53) Badarpur, (NH154) Panchgram, (NH54) Kolasib, Kanpui, Aizawl, NH2 near Seling	Meghalaya, Assam, Mizoram	518	322
NH 6	106	(NH44E) Shillong, Nongstoin	Meghalaya	82	51
NH 6	206	(NH40) Jowai, Dauki, Mylliem	Meghalaya	126	78
NH 6	306	(NH54) Kolasib, Silchar	Assam, Mizoram	90	56
NH 6	306A	NH306 near Saiphai, Zonmun, NH2 near New Vertek	Mizoram	60	37
NH 7		(NH10) Fazilka, (NH15) Abohar, Malout (Muktsar ), (NH64) Bathinda, Barnala, Sangrur, Patiala, Rajpura, (NH73) Panchkula, Raipur Rani, (NH72) Narayangarh, Dhanana, Paonta Sahib, Dehradun, (NH58) Rishikesh, Devprayag, Rudraprayag, Karnaprayag, Chamoli, Badrinath, Mana	Punjab, Chandigarh, Haryana, Himachal Pradesh, Uttarakhand	841	523
NH 7	107	(NH109) Rudraprayag, Guptkashi, Phata, Gaurikund	Uttarakhand	78	48
NH 7	107A	NH7 near Chamoli, Gopeshwar, Okhimath, NH107 near Baramwari	Uttarakhand	85	53
NH 7	207	NH7 near Lachhiwala, Doiwala, Jolly Grant Airport, Maa Ichha Devi, Laxmangarhpura, NH34 near Narendra Nagar, NH34 Bypass, NH34 near Harendrapura	Uttarakhand	40	25
NH 7	207A	NH7 near Maa Ichha Devi, Rishikesh, Virbhadra, Ganga Barrage, Alternate Route to NH34 near Garudchatti	Uttarakhand	32	20
NH 7	307	(NH72A) Dehradun, Mohand, Biharigarh, Chhutmalpur	Uttarakhand, Uttar Pradesh	46	29
NH 7	507	(NH123) Harbatpur, Vikasnagar, Kalsi, Barkot	Uttarakhand	109	68
NH 7	707	(NH72B) Paonta Sahib, Rajban, Shillai, Minas, Minus-Tiuni, Hatkoti	Himachal Pradesh, Uttarakhand	151	94
NH 7	707A	NH707 near Tiuni, Chakrata, Bhediyana, Mussoorie, New Tihri, NH7 near Srinagar	Uttarakhand	315	196
NH 7	907	(NH73A) Paonta Sahib, Darpur, Ledi, Mustafabad, Jagadhri, Yamuna Nagar	Himachal Pradesh, Uttarakhand, Haryana	60	37
NH 7	907A	NH7 near Nahan Banethi, Sarahan, NH5 near Kumarhatti	Himachal Pradesh	78.3	48.7
NH 7	907G	NH907 near Jagadhri, Jaroda, Budheri, Bherthal, Mahmoodpur, Salempur Banger, Bilaspur	Haryana	14.8	9.2
NH 8		(NH44) Karimganj, Patharkandi, Churaibari, Ambasa, Teliamura, Agartala, Udaipur, Sabrum Indo	Assam, Tripura	371	231
NH 8	108	(NH44A) Namu, Mamit, Lengpui, Sairang, Aizawl	Tripura, Mizoram	193	120
NH 8	108A	NH8 near Jolaibari, Belonia, Indo/Bangladesh border	Tripura	23	14
NH 8	108B	NH8 near Agartala, NH 208 near Khowai	Tripura	55	34
NH 8	208	NH8 near Kumarghat, Kailashahar, Khowai, NH8 near Teliamura	Tripura	158	98
NH 8	208A	NH 208 near Kailashahar, Dharmanagar, Kadamtala, Premtola, Kurti RCC, Kathaltali, Kukital, NH8 near Chand Khera	Tripura, Assam	79	49
NH 9		(NH10) Fazilka, Malout (Muktsar ), Dabwali, Sirsa, Fatehabad, Hisar, Hansi, Rohtak, Bahadurgarh, (NH24) Delhi, Ghaziabad, Moradabad, (NH87) Rampur, Bilaspur, (NH74) Rudrapur, (NH125) Sitarganj-Khatima, Tanakpur, Pithoragarh, Ogla and terminating at Gori Ganga Bridge, Askot	Punjab, Haryana, Delhi, Uttar Pradesh, Uttarakhand	954	593
NH 9	109	(NH87) Rudrapur, Haldwani, Nainital, Bhowali, Almora, Ranikhet, Dwarahat, Chaukhutiya, Gairsain, Aadibadri, Karnaprayag	Uttarakhand	324	201
NH 9	109D	NH-9 at km 40.00 near Jagbuda bridge and terminating near pillar no. 802/11 of Indo-Nepal border	Uttarakhand		
NH 9	109K	NH109 near Simli, Tharali, Gwaldam, Baijnath, Bageshwar, Kapkot, Tejam, Munsyari, Madkot, Jauljibi	Uttarakhand	256	159
NH 9	309	(NH74) Rudrapur, (NH121) Kashipur, Ramnagar, Dhumakot, Thalisain, Tripalisan, (NH119) Bubakhal, Pauri, Srinagar	Uttarakhand, Uttar Pradesh	298	185
NH 9	309A	NH9 near Rameshwar, Gangolihat, Berinag, Chaukori, Kanda, Bagheshwar, Takula, Almora	Uttarakhand	126	78
NH 9	309B	NH109 near Almora, NH9 near Rameshwar	Uttarakhand	82	51
NH 9	509	(NH93) NH9 near Moradabad, Chandausi, Babrala, Aligarh, NH19 near Agra	Uttar Pradesh	239	149
NH 9	709	(NH71A) Rajgarh, Pilani, Bhiwani, Rohtak, Gohana, Panipat	Rajasthan, Haryana	248	154
NH 9	709A	(NH709) near Bhiwani, Mundal, Jind, Karnal, Shamli, Budhana, Meerut	Haryana, Uttar Pradesh	264	164
NH 9	709AD	(NH709B) near Panipat, Shamli, Muzaffarnagar, Bijnor, Nagina	Haryana, Uttar Pradesh	170	110
NH 9	709B	(NH709A) near Baghpat, Baraut, Shamli, Thanabhawan, Saharanpur	Delhi, Uttar Pradesh	155	96
NH 9	709EXT	Rohtak, Bhiwani, Lohani, Loharu, Pilani, NH52 near Rajgarh	Haryana	169.6	105.4
NH 10		(NH31) Siliguri, (NH31A) Sivok, Kalimpong, Gangtok	Sikkim, West Bengal	120	75
NH 10	110	(NH55) Siliguri, Kurseong, Darjeeling	West Bengal	76	47
NH 10	310	NH10 near Gangtok, Burduk, Menla, Nathula	Sikkim	55	34
NH 10	310A	NH310 at Tashiview point, Phodang, Mangan, Lachung, Kataola	Sikkim	144.6	89.9
NH 10	310B	NH310A near Lachung, Yumthang, Yumesodong, Zero Point, Khangtse	Sikkim	53.4	33.2
NH 10	310C	NH310A near Chungtham, Lachen, Thangu Valley, Gurudongmar, Tso Lhamo	Sikkim	100	62
NH 10	510	NH10 near Singtham, Damthang, Ravangla, Legship, Geyzing, Pelling, Yuksom	Sikkim	122	76
NH 10	710	NH10 near Melli, Manpur, Namchi, Damthang, Ravangla	Sikkim	56	35
NH 10	910	NH10 near Melli, Jorethang, Nayabazar, Geyzing, Pelling, Dentam, Singshore Bridge, Uttarey	Sikkim	91.2	56.7
NH 11		(NH15) Jaisalmer, Pokaran, (NH11) Bikaner, Sri Dungargarh, Ratangarh, Fatehpur, Sikar, Narnaul, Rewari	Rajasthan	848	527
NH 11	111	NH11 near Narnaul, Dabla, Neem-Ka-Thana, NH311 near Udaipurwati	Rajasthan	111	69
NH 11	211	NH311 near Khetri Nagar, Neem-Ka-Thana, Ajeetgarh, Chomu-Samod, Renwal, Asalpur Jobner, Phulera, NH48 near Mokhampura	Rajasthan	235	146
NH 11	311	NH11 near Singhana, Khetri Nagar, Jasrapur, Chhawaswari, Udaipurwati, NH511 near Sikar, Khoor, Loswal, Kuchaman City	Rajasthan	185	115
NH 11	511	NH11 near Bikaner, Napasar, Ladnun, Nechwa, Sikar	Rajasthan	212.4	132.0
NH 11	711	NH11 near Phalodi, Osiyan, Mandore, Jodhpur, Luni, Samdari, Balotra, Googri	Rajasthan	288	179
NH 11	911	NH11 near Bap, Naukh, Bikampur, Charanwala, Ranjitpura, Goru (Godu), Jaggasar, Dantour, Pugal, Sattasar, Chhattargarh, Rojhri, Gharsana, Anupgarh, Raisinghnagar, Gajsinghpur, Padampur, Sadhuwali (Sri Ganganagar) near NH62	Rajasthan	444	276
NH 11	911A	NH-911 near Poogal connecting Khajuwala (Beriyanwala), Rawla Mandi, Gharsana, Anupgarh, Ramsinghpur, NH62 near Suratgarh	Rajasthan	200	120
NH 12		(NH34) Dalkola, Raiganj, Gazole, Maldah, Farakka, Morgram, Baharampur, Krishananagar, Ranaghat, Barasat, Kolkata Airport, Newton Kolkata, EM Bypass, Kolkata, Diamond Harbour, Kakdwip, Namkhana, Bok-Khali	West Bengal	625	388
NH 12	112	(NH35) Barasat, Gaighata, Bangaon, Petrapole border	West Bengal	59	37
NH 12	112A	(NH35) Barjaguli, Kalyani, Magra, Dankuni	West Bengal	65.1	40.5
NH 12	312	NH12 near Jangipur, Omarpur, Murshidabad, Chunakhali, Jalangi, Karimpur, Tehatta, Krishangar, Hanskhali, Duttaphulia, Helencha, Bongoan, Panchpota, Berigopalpur Ghat, Ichamati, Tarnipur Ghat, Swarupnagar, Basirhat (Ghojadanga)	West Bengal	320.1	198.9
NH 12	312A	NH12 near Maslandapur, Basirhat, Taki, Malancha, Sonakhali, Gosaba	West Bengal	123	76
NH 12	312B	NH312A near Malancha, EM Bypass at Kolkata, Alipore, Maheshtala, Budge Budge	West Bengal	71.5	44.4
NH 12	512	NH12 near Gazole, Daulatpur, Bansihari, Gangarampur, Harsura, Balurghat, Hilli (near Indo/Bangladesh Border)	West Bengal	96	60
NH 12	712	Ghojadanga Border, NH12 near Basirhat, Berachampa, Barasat, Nilgunj, Barrackpore	West Bengal	74	46
NH 12	712A	NH712 near Berachampa, Rajarhat, Sonarpur, Baruipur, Lakshmikantapur, NH12 near Kulpi	West Bengal	106	66
NH 12	712B	NH312 near Basirhat, Haroa, Rajarhat, Nimta, Barrackpore, Kanchrapara, Kalyani	West Bengal	102.50	63.69
NH 12	912	NH312 near Bangaon, Chakdaha, Haringhata, Bagna, Habra, Chakladham, Berachampa, Haroa	West Bengal	117	73
NH 13		(NH229) Tawang, Jang, Sela Lake, Baisakhi, Senge, Mohan Camp, Dirang, Dangsing, Bomdila, Tenga Valley, Kimi, Palizi, Seppa, Sagalee, Midpu, Hoz, Yazali, Ziro Town, Daporijo, Bam, Along, Biru, Pangin, Pasighat (NH-52)	Arunachal Pradesh, Assam	1,165	724
NH 13	113	NH13 near Hawacamp, Hayuliang, Hawai	Arunachal Pradesh	165	103
NH 13	313	NH13 near Meka, Anini	Arunachal Pradesh	235	146
NH 13	513	NH13 near Passighat, Mariyang, Yingkiong	Arunachal Pradesh	140	87
NH 13	713	NH13 near Joram, Palin, Sangram, Koloriang	Arunachal Pradesh	158	98
NH 13	713A	NH13 near Hoj, Yupia, NH415 near Nahurlagun	Arunachal Pradesh	35	22
NH 14		(NH60) Morgram, Rampurhat, Siuri, Raniganj, (NH60A) Bankura, Bisnupur, Garhbeta, Salbani, Kharagpur	West Bengal	360	220
NH 14	114	(NH2B Ext) Mallarpur, Mayureswar, Prantik, (NH2B) Bolpur, Bhedia, Guskhara, Talit, Barddhaman	West Bengal	111	69
NH 14	114A	NH19 near Dumri, Giridih, Madhupur Sarath, Deoghar, Choupa More, Jarmundi, Jamua, Lakrapahari, Dumka, Shikaripara, Sunrichua, NH14 near Rampurhat	Jharkhand, West Bengal	265	165
NH 14	114B	NH114A near Pattabari, Masanjor, Seorakuri, Suiri, Hetampur, Illambazar, Panagarh on 19, Durgapur Barrage, Bankura on 14	Jharkhand, West Bengal	177	110
NH 14	114C	NH114A near Deoghar, AIIMS Deoghar, Burhai, Chapuadih, Bahadurpur, Maheshmunda, Murlipahari, Pandeydih on Route-2 (Gobindpur-Narainpur-Jamtara Highway) of 419	Jharkhand	84.7	52.6
NH 14	114D	NH114A near Deoghar, AIIMS Deoghar, Burhai, Jagdishpur, Murlipahari, Pandeydih on Route-2 (Gobindpur-Narainpur-Jamtara Highway) of 419	Jharkhand	84.3	52.4
NH 14	214	NH14 near Suiri, Mohammadbazar, Sainthia, Kandi, NH12 near Berhampore	West Bengal	91	57
NH 14	214A	NH114 near Sainthia, Chauhata, Labpur, Kirnahar, Ketugram, Katwa, Nabadwip Dham, Krishnanagar	West Bengal	132	82
NH 14	314	NH14 near Bankura, Puabagan, Hura, Purulia, Jhalda, Tulin, Muri, Kita, Ranchi	West Bengal	206	128
NH 14	514	NH14 near Bishnupur, Arambag, Champadanga, Seakhala, Chanditala, NH19 near Dankuni	West Bengal	130	81
NH 14	714	NH14 near Bankura, Puabagan, Bheduasole, Hatirampur, Khatra, Mukutmanipur, Garh Raipur, Silda, Binpur, Jhargram, NH49 near Lodhasuli	West Bengal	159	99
NH 15		(NH52) Baihata-Charali, Mangaldai, Dhekiajui, Tezpur, Banderdeva, North Lakhimpur, (NH52B) Kulajan, (NH37) Dibrugarh, Tinsukia, (NH52) Rupai, Mahadevpur, Wakro	Assam, Arunachal Pradesh	664	413
NH 15	115	(NH37) Dum Duma, Saikhoaghat, Kundil Bazar, Roing	Assam	64	40
NH 15	215	(NH52B) Mahadevpur, Namchik, Changlang, Khonsa, Kanubari, Dibrugarh	Assam		
NH 15	315	(NH153) Makum, Ledo, Lekhapani, border	Assam	111	69
NH 15	315A	NH215 near Khonsa, Hukanjuri, Nahorkatia, NH15 near Tinsukia	Arunachal Pradesh, Assam	158	98
NH 15	415	(NH52A) Ghopur, Itanagar, Daimukh, Banderdeva	Assam, Arunachal Pradesh	59	37
NH 15	515	(NH52) Kulajan, Jonai, Pasighat	Assam, Arunachal Pradesh	111	69
NH 15	715	(NH37A) Tejpur, (NH37) Kaliabor, Jakhalabandha, Bokakhat, Jorhat, Jhanji	Assam	197	122
NH 15	715A	NH27 near Nakhola, Jagiroad, Marigaon, Kaupati, Rowta, Udalguri, Khoirabari, Indo/Bhutan border			
NH 16		(NH6) Kolkata, (NH60) Kharagpur, (NH5) Baleshwar, Bhadrak, Cuttack, Bhubaneshwar, Berhampur, Srikakulam, Vishakhapatnam, Eluru Vijayawada, Guntur, Chilakaluripet, Ongole, Nellore, Chennai	West Bengal, Odisha, Andhra Pradesh, Tamil Nadu	1,681	1,045
NH 16	116	(NH41) Kolaghat, Mecheda, Tamluk, Nandakumar, Haldia Port	West Bengal	52	32
NH 16	116A	NH16 near Tamluk (Radhamoni), Panskura, Ghatal, Khirpai, Kamarpukur, Arambagh, Sehara Bazar, Bardhaman, Mangalkot, Futishanko, Kulin, Panchgram, NH 14 & NH12 near Morgram	West Bengal	282	175
NH 16	116B	NH116 near Nandakumar, Contai, Digha, Chandaneswar	West Bengal	110	68
NH 16	116C	NH116 near Contai, Egra, Belda, Keshiyari, Nayagram, Gopiballavpur, Anshui, Athangi, Hatibari, NH49 near Jamsola	West Bengal, Odisha	146	91
NH 16	216	(NH214) Kathipudi, Kakinada, (NH214A) Machilipatnam, Ongole	Andhra Pradesh	397	247
NH 16	216A	NH16 near Rajahmundry, Ravulapalem, Tanuku, NH16 near Gondugolanu	Andhra Pradesh	117	73
NH 16	216E	NH16 near Kovur, Godavari Barrage, Ravulapalem, Amalapuram, Odalarevu	Andhra Pradesh	94	58
NH 16	316	(NH203) NH16 near Bhubaneshwar - Malatipur, Ratannagar, Puri - Puri Beach - Satpada	Odisha	135	84
NH 16	316A	NH316 near Pipli, Charichak, Jagatsinghpur, Tarapur, Pattmundai, Chandbali, Bhadrak, Balasore, Jaleswar, Digha	Odisha, West Bengal	388	241
NH 16	316B	NH16 near Bhadrak - Anandpur - Karanjia on NH220	Odisha	123	76
NH 16	516	(NH217) NH16 near Brahmapur - Gopalpur - Chhatarpur	Odisha	22	14
NH 16	516A	NH16 near Rambha, Chilika, Janhikuda	Odisha	55	34
NH 16	516B	NH16 near Pendurthi at Visakhapatnam, Kothavalsa, Bowdara, Araku, Lamataput, Jeypore	Andhra Pradesh, Odisha	180	110
NH 16	516C	The highway starting from its junction with NH-16 at Anandapuram, Madhurawada, Vizag Stadium, Simhachalam, Vepagunta, Pendurthi in the state of Andhra Pradesh	Andhra Pradesh	41	25
NH 16	516D	NH16 near Deverapalli, Golladgudem, Gopalapuram, Jaganathapuram, Atchyutapuram, Koyyalgudem, Bayyanagudem, Seetampeta, Narasannapalem, Jangareddigudam, Vegavaram, Taduvai, Darbhagudem, Jeelugumilli near Andhra Pradesh/Telangana border	Andhra Pradesh	59	37
NH 16	516E	NH16 near Rajamundry, Bhupatiapalem Road (connecting SH-38 near Rampachodavaram), Koyyuru, Chintapalli, Lambasingi, Paderu, Aruku, Bowadara, Tadipudi, NH26 at Vizianagaram	Andhra Pradesh	378	235
NH 16	716	(NH205) Chennai, Tiruttani, Renigunta (To be merged with NH71 as part of Chennai-Hyderabad Expressway Project)	Andhra Pradesh, Tamil Nadu	147	91
NH 16	716A	NH716 near Puttur, Narayana Vanam, Thumburu, Koppedu, Harijan, Vada, Ramagiri, Krishnapuram, Utthukottai, Tharachi, Palavakkam, Periyapalam, Kannigaipair, NH16 near Janappachataram	Andhra Pradesh, Tamil Nadu	74	46
NH 16	716B	NH716 near Thiruttani, Arakkonam, Ponnai, NH40 near Chittoor	Andhra Pradesh, Tamil Nadu	84	52
NH 17		(NH31) NH10 near Sivok, Bagrakot, (NH31C) Chalsa, Nagarkata, (NH31) Goyerkata, Bispara, Falakata, Sonarpur, Koch-Bihar, Tufanganj, Golakganj, Bilasipara, (NH31B) North Salmana, (NH37) Goalpara, Boko, NH27 near Guwahati, Rangiya, Rangapara	West Bengal, Assam	592	368
NH 17	117	(NH31) NH17 near North Salmara, NH27 near Bijni	Assam	14	8.7
NH 17	117A	NH17 near Bilasipara, Kokrajhar, NH27 near Karigaon, Garubhasa	Assam	39.8	24.7
NH 17	117B	NH17 near Agia (Goalpara), Lakhipur, Phulbari, Rajbala, Hatsingimari, Garobadha, Betasing, Zikzak, Mahendraganj, Purakhasia, Baengapara on NH217	Assam, Meghalaya	231	144
NH 17	217	(NH51) NH17 near Paikan, Tura, (NH62) Dalu, Baghmara, Rongjeng Damra, NH17 near Dudhnai	Assam, Meghalaya	307	191
NH 17	317	(NH31C) NH17 near Birpara, Madarihat, Rajabhatkhawa, NH27 near Salsabari	West Bengal	75.1	46.7
NH 17	317A	NH317 near Hasimara, Hamilton Morh, Jaigaon, Indo / Bhutan Border	West Bengal	17.7	11.0
NH 17	317B	NH317 near Jaldpara Morh, Falakata, Ramthenga, Mathabhanga, Sitalkuchi, Sitai	West Bengal	93.2	57.9
NH 17	317C	NH317 near Damanpur, Alipurduar, Baneswar Battala, Khagrabari Chowpatti, Coochbehar, Ghughumari, Dinhata, Gitaldaha	West Bengal	77	48
NH 17	517	NH17 near Parangarpar, Birpara, Telipara, NH27 near Dhupguri	West Bengal	48.2	30.0
NH 17	517A	NH717 near Changrabandha, Mathabhanga, Nishiganj, Ghughumari	West Bengal	74.4	46.2
NH 17	717	NH17 near Chalsa, NH27 near Mainaguri, Changrabandha, Mekliganj, Tin Bigha, Kuchlibari	West Bengal	98	61
NH 17	717A	NH17 near Bagrakot, Rhenok, Pakyong, NH10 near Gangtok	West Bengal, Sikkim	136	85
NH 17	717B	NH717A near Rhenok, Aritar, Rolep, NH310 near Menla	Sikkim	124	77
NH 17	917	Ramthenga, Ghoksadanga, Pundibari, Baneswar Battala	West Bengal	36	22
NH 18		(NH32) NH20 near Koderma, Jamui, Giridih, Govindpur, Dhanbad, Bhuli, Hirak, Kanko, Chas (Bokaro), Puruliya, Balarampur, (NH33) Chandil, Ghatshila, (NH6) Baharagora, (NH5) Jharpokharia Junction on NH49, Baripada, Betnoti, NH16 near Baleshwar	Jharkhand, West Bengal, Odisha	594	369
NH 18	118	NH18 near Asanboni, Mango Bridge Mor, Jamshedpur, Adityapur, Kandra Toll Plaza, Chowka Toll Plaza, Bansa Mor, Ghat Dulmi, Chawlibasa on NH43	Jharkhand	56.4	35.0
NH 18	118A	NH18 near Asanboni, Dimna Lake, Patamda, Katin, Banduan, Manbazar, Chaklator, Purulia on NH18 (Old Purulia Road)	Jharkhand, West Bengal	145.8	90.6
NH 18	118B	NH18 near Balarampur near Purulia, Baghmundi, Jhalida on NH314 (Ayodhya Pahar Road)	West Bengal	63.1	39.2
NH 18	218	NH18 near Purulia in the state of West Bengal connecting Chandankiyari, Jhariya, Dhanbad & ending in Kishan Chowk on NH-19 in Dhanbad in the state of Jharkhand	West Bengal, Jharkhand	65.2	40.5
NH 18	218A	NH18 near Purulia connecting Raghunathpur, Dishergarh & ending in Neamatpur on NH-19 in Asansol in the state of West Bengal	West Bengal, Jharkhand	82	51
NH 18	218B	NH18 near Damda (Purulia) in the state of West Bengal connecting Chaklator, Barabazar, Banduan, Duarsini ending on NH-18 in Galudih in the state of Jharkhand (Purulia-Duarsini-Galudih Road)	West Bengal, Jharkhand	89.8	55.8
NH 18	318	NH-18 near Dhalbhumgarh in the state of Jharkhand connecting Chakulia, Belpahari, Jhilimili, Ranibandh and terminating at its junction with NH-714 near Khatra in the state of West Bengal	West Bengal, Jharkhand	110	68
NH 18	518	NH18 near Manpur, Cheliyama, Raghunathpur, Chhatna, NH14 near Bankura	Jharkhand, West Bengal	96.9	60.2
NH 19		(NH2) Delhi, Mathura, Agra, Kanpur, Prayagraj, Varanasi, Mohania, Aurangabad, Dobhi, Barhi, Bagodar, Gobindpur, Chirkunda, Asansol, Raniganj, Durgapur, Panagarh Bypass, Bardhhaman Bypass, Palsit, Dankuni, Kolkata	Delhi, Haryana, Uttar Pradesh, Bihar, Jharkhand, West Bengal	1,512	940
NH 19	119	(NH2C) NH19 near Dehri, Jadunathpur, border Bihar/UP	Bihar, Uttar Pradesh	100	62
NH 19	119D	NH19 near Morhar, Gaya, Islampor/Magadh, Ekangasarai, Daniwayan	Bihar	127	79
NH 19	219	NH19 near Mohania, Bhabhua, Chainpur, Chand, NH19 near Chandauli	Bihar, Uttar Pradesh	60	37
NH 19	219A	NH219 near Bhabhua, Kaimur, Adhaura	Bihar	54	34
NH 19	319	(NH30) NH19 near Mohania, Dinara, Charpokhari, NH922 near Ara	Bihar	117	73
NH 19	319A	NH-19 near Mohania connecting Ramgarh, Chausa and terminating at its junction with NH-124C near Buxar	Bihar	64	40
NH 19	319B (Varanasi-Kolkata Expressway)	NH-19 near Mughalsarai, Chainpur, Bhabua, Sasaram, Chatra, Hazaribagh, Ranchi, Purulia, Salboni, Kolaghat, Geokhali, Roychak, Kolkata	Uttar Pradesh, Bihar, Jharkhand, West Bengal	702.3	436.4
NH 19	319C	NH19 near Aurai, Chilh, Mirzapur, Marihan, NH739 near Hinduhari	Uttar Pradesh	93	58
NH 19	319D	NH19 near Prayagraj, Mungra Badshahpur, Badlapur, Shahganj, NH28 near Azamgarh	Uttar Pradesh	178	111
NH 19	419	Route-1 primarily existing from NH19 near Gobindapur, Halkatta, Saharpur, Narainpur, Jamtara, Nala, NH14 near Suri	Jharkhand, West Bengal	157	98
NH 19	419	Route-2 secondarily existing from NH19 near Neamatpur, Salanpur, Dendua, Chittaranjan, Jamtara, Karmatanr, Margomunda, NH114A near Madhupur	West Bengal, Jharkhand	79	49
NH 19	419	Route-3 newly made from NH419 near Jamtara, Dumka, Amarpara, Litipara (Pakur), NH33 near Sahibganj	Jharkhand	223	139
NH 19	519	(NH2A) NH19 near Sikandara, Bhognipur, Ghatampur, Jahanabad, Chaudhagra	Uttar Pradesh	112	70
NH 19	719	(NH92) NH19 near Etawah, Bhind, NH44 near Gwalior	Uttar Pradesh, Madhya Pradesh	132	82
NH 19	919	(NH71B) NH19 near Palwal, Sohna, Dharuhera, NH352 near Rewari	Haryana	81	50
NH 20		(NH31) NH31 near Bakhtiyarpur, Bihar Sharif, Nawada, Rajauli, Kodarma, (NH33) Barhi, Hazaribag, (NH75) Ranchi, Khunti, Murhu, Chakradharpur, Chaibasa, Jaintgarh, Parsora, (NH215) Kendujhargarh, NH16 near Panikholi	Bihar, Jharkhand, Odisha	676	420
NH 20	120	(NH82) NH20 near Bihar Sharif, Nalanda, Rajgir, Hisua, NH22 near Gaya	Bihar	92	57
NH 20	220	NH20 near Chaibasa, Gobindpur, Hata, Tiringidihi, Rairangpur, Jashipur, NH20 near Dhenkikot	Jharkhand, Odisha	191	119
NH 20	220A	NH220 near Hata, Jadugora, NH18 on Ghatshila	Jharkhand	44	27
NH 20	320	NH20 near Ormanjhi, Sikidiri, Gola, Peterbar, Bandhdih, NH18 near Chas	Jharkhand	93	58
NH 20	320A	NH320 near Chas, Chandankiyari, Raghunathpur, Saltora, Mejia on NH14	Jharkhand, West Bengal	101	63
NH 20	320B	NH-20 near Ranchi, Kanke, Patratu, Bhurkunda, Ramgarh, Gola, Saragdih (Subarnarekha), Jhalda	Jharkhand, West Bengal	127	79
NH 20	320D	NH-20 near Chakradharpur connecting Sonua, Goelkera, Manoharpur, Jaraikela in the state of Jharkhand and terminating at its junction with NH-143 (Raurkela Bypass) in the state of Odisha	Jharkhand, Odisha	133.8	83.1
NH 20	320G	NH-20 near Hat Gamaria connecting Jagannathpur, Baraiburu, Saddle, Manoharpur, Anandpur, Bano and terminating at its junction with NH- 143 near Kolebira	Jharkhand	180	110
NH 20	420	NH-320B near Saragdih (Subarnarekha), Muri, Silli, Bantahajam, Rahe, NH-43 near Bundu	Jharkhand	57	35
NH 20	520	NH49 near Barkote, Mahuldiha, Bileipada, Lahunipada, NH143 near Rajamundra, Bimlagarh, Bhadrasahi, Rimuli	Odisha	254	158
NH 20	720	NH20 near Kendujhargarh, NH53 at Duburi	Odisha	91	57
NH 21		(NH11) Jaipur, Dausa, Bharatpur, Agra, Jalesar, Sikandra Rao, NH 30 near Bareilly	Rajasthan, Uttar Pradesh	502	312
NH 21	121	NH21 near Bharatpur, Uchain, Bayana, Hindaun, Gangapur, NH552B near Malarandungar	Rajasthan	160	99
NH 21	221	NH21 near Mahwa, Hindaun, Karauli	Rajasthan	66	41
NH 21	321	NH21 near Agra, Fatehabad, Bah, Etawah	Uttar Pradesh, Rajasthan	116	72
NH 21	321A	NH21 near Agra, Bayana, Hinduan, Gangapur	Uttar Pradesh, Rajasthan	163	101
NH 21	321C	NH21 near Agra, Jagner, Timangarh, Karauli	Uttar Pradesh, Rajasthan	134	83
NH 21	321G	starting from its junction with NH 21 near Jalesar connecting Awagarh, Etah and terminating at its junction with NH19 near Shikohabad	Uttar Pradesh	96	60
NH 21	521	NH21 near Bharatpur, Deeg, NH248A near Alwar	Rajasthan	113	70
NH 21	721	NH921 near Rajgarh, Alwar, Behror, NH11 near Narnaul	Rajasthan	132	82
NH 21	921	NH21 near Mahwa, Mandwar, Nangal Sumer Singh, Almarpur, Kheda, Mangalsinh, Ghadi, Antapuar, Piana, Doroli, Machedi Mode, Rajgarh bypass	Rajasthan	47	29
NH 22		(NH77) border near Sonbarsa, Sitamarhi, Muzaffarpur, (NH19) Hajipur, (NH83) Patna, Punpun, Gaya, Bodh Gaya, (NH99) Dobhi, Hunterganj, Chatra, NH39 near Chandwa	Bihar, Jharkhand	416	258
NH 22	122	(NH28) NH22 near Muzaffarpur, Dholi, Mushrigharari, NH31 near Barauni	Bihar	101	63
NH 22	122A	NH22 near Vishwanathpur Chowk, Koili, NH527C near Nanpur			
NH 22	122B	NH-22 near Hazipur connecting Mahanar, Mohiuddin Nagar and terminating at its junction with NH-122 near Bachwara	Bihar		
NH 22	322	(NH103) NH22 near Hazipur, NH122 near Mushrigharari	Bihar	58	36
NH 22	522	(NH100) NH22 near Chatra, Hazaribagh, NH19 near Bagodar	Jharkhand	119	74
NH 22	722	(NH102) NH22 near Muzaffarpur, Rewaghat, NH31 near Chhapra	Bihar	74	46
NH 22	922	(NH30) NH22 near Patna, (NH84) Ara, Bhojpur, Buxar	Uttar Pradesh, Bihar	140	87
NH 23		(NH11A) Kothum, (NH11B) Lalsot, Gangapur, Karauli, Dhaulpur, Etawah	Rajasthan	324	201
NH 23	123	NH23 near Dhaulpur, Sepau, Ghatoli, Rupbas, NH21 near Uncha Nagla	Rajasthan	86	53
NH 23	123A	NH23 near Bari, Saipau, Saiyan, Shamshabad, Rajakhera	89	55	
NH 23	223	NH23 near Bari, NH21 near Bharatpur	Rajasthan	81	50
NH 23	323	NH23 near Karauli, NH552 near Sabalgarh	Rajasthan, Madhya Pradesh	61	38
NH 23	523	NH23 near Gangapur, Gudhachandraji, Bandikui, NH921 near Rajgarh	Rajasthan	101	63
NH 23	723	NH223 near Tantpur, NH21 near Agra	Rajasthan, Uttar Pradesh	76	47
NH 24		(NH29) Sonauli (border), Pharenda, Gorakhpur, Dohrighat Mau, (NH97) Ghazipur, Bhadaura, Dildarnagar, Zamania, NH19 near Saiyad Raja	Uttar Pradesh	331	206
NH 24	124C	NH24 near Tarighat, Bara, NH922 near Buxar	Uttar Pradesh, Bihar	331	206
NH 24	124D	Starting from its junction with NH-24 near Mardah connecting Jakhania, Sadat, NH-31 near Saidpur, and terminating at its junction with NH19 at Chandauli	Uttar Pradesh	113	70
NH 24	224	Starting from its junction with NH-124C near Chausa connecting Kochas, Kargahar and terminating at its junction with NH19 at Sasaram	Bihar	69	43
NH 24	324	Starting from its junction with NH-124D & NH-31 near Enayetpur connecting Saidpur, Sakaldiha, Chandauli, Godhana, Chakia Naugarh and terminating at its junction with NH739 (Varanasi-Renukoot Road) near Madhupur in Uttar Pradesh	Uttar Pradesh	141	88
NH 25		Munabao Road, Ramsar, (NH112) Barmer, Kawas, Madhasar, Dhudhwa, Bagundi, Tilwara, Balotra, Pachpadra, Kalyanpur, Jodhpur, Kaparda, Bilara, Jaitaran, (NH14) Bar, Beawar	Rajasthan	500	310
NH 25	125	(NH114) Jodhpur, Balesar, Dechu, Pokaran, Ramdevra, Nachna Border	Rajasthan	266	165
NH 25	225	Nh25 near Dangiyawas, Luni (rail station), Samdhari, NH25 near Balotra	Rajasthan	132	82
NH 25	325	NH25 near Balotra, Siwana, Jalore, Ahore, Takhatgarh, NH62 near Sanderao	Rajasthan	150	93
NH 25	525	NH25 near Bagundi, Pachpadra, NH125 near Shaitrawa	Rajasthan	114	71
NH 25	725	NH25 near Barmer, Chhaava, Baytu, Phalsund, Bhaniyana, Pokaran	Rajasthan	186	116
NH 25	925	NH25 near Gagriya, Baori kalan, Serwa, Bakhasar Border	Rajasthan, Gujarat	148	92
NH 25	925A	NH925 near Satta, Gandhav, Sindhari, NH25 near Balotra	Rajasthan	196	122
NH 26		(NH201) NH53 near Bargarh, Barapali, Balangir, Nowrangpur, Bhawanipatna, (NH43) Boriguma, Koraput, Salur, Vizianagaram, Junction at NH16 near Thagarapuvalsa (Visakhapatnam)	Odisha, Andhra Pradesh	625	388
NH 26	126	NH26 near Barapali, Dhaurakhanda, Panimora, Chichinda, NH53 near Sohela, Saraipalli, Sarsiwa, Malkharoda, NH 49 near Sakti	Odisha, Chhattisgarh	159	99
NH 26	126A	NH26 near Barapali, Rampur, Singhijuba, Bisalpalii, Nagapalli, NH57 near Sonepur	Odisha	59.5	37.0
NH 26	126B	Odisha SH10 near Rourkela, Sundergarh, Jharsuguda, Sambalpur, Bargarh, Sohela, Nawapada, Dharamgarh, Ampanai, Nowrangpur on NH26	Odisha	650	400 (instance of subsidiary highway longer than main highway)
NH 26	326	NH59 near Asika, Pattapur, Mohana, Jaykaypur, Rayagada, Laxmipur, Koraput (NH26), Jeypore, Malkangiri, Kalimela, NH30 near Chinturu	Odisha, Andhra Pradesh	560	350
NH 26	326A	NH326 near Mohana, Chandiput, Chheligada, Ramagiri Udayagiri, Raygarh, Paralakhemundi, NH16 near Narasannapeta	Odisha, Andhra Pradesh	158	98
NH 26	526	NH159 near Bishamakatek, Gunupur Paralakhemundi, NH16 near Panukuru	Odisha, Andhra Pradesh	155	96
NH 26	726	NH326 near Kariniguda, Ramaguda, Gummalaxmipuram, Veeraghattam, Palakonda, Srikakulam	Odisha, Andhra Pradesh	138	86
NH 27		(NH112) Porbandar, (NH8A) Bamanbore, Morvi, (NH15) Samakhiali, (NH14) Radhanpur, Palanpur, (NH76) Pindwara, Udaipur, Mangarwar, Chittaurgarh, Bundi, Kota, Baran, Shivpuri (NH25), Jhansi, (NH128) Kanpur, Lucknow, (NH28) Ayodhya, Gorakhpur, Gopalganj, Pipra, Kothi, Chakia, (NH57) Muzaffarpur, Darbhanga, Saraygarh, Forbesganj, Araria, (NH31) Purnia, (NH12) Dalkola, Islampur, (NH31D) Siliguri, Jalaiguri, (NH31) Moynaguri, Dhupguri, Falakata, (NH31D) Sonapur, (NH31C) Salsaguri, (NH31) Bongaigaon, Bijni, Patacharkuchi, Nalbari, Rangiya, (NH37) Guwahati, Dispur, (NH36) Nagaon, (NH54) Dobaka, Lumding, Haflong, Silchar	Gujarat, Rajasthan, Madhya Pradesh, Uttar Pradesh, Bihar, West Bengal, Assam	3,660.25	2,274.37
NH 27	127	(NH37) NH27 near Nagaon, Samaguri, NH715 near Kaliabor	Assam	45	28
NH 27	127A	(NH152) Simlaguri - Manas National Park - Bhutan border	Assam	72	45
NH 27	127B	NH27 near Srimrampur, Dhuburi, Phulbari, (NH51) Tura, (NH-) Rongram, Ronjeng, NH106 near Nongston	Assam	246	153
NH 27	127C	Shyam Thai - Hithijhar State PWD road starting from NH- 27 in Chirang District, Assam and meeting at Gelegphu in Bhutan	Assam	47	29
NH 27	127D	Rangiya - Darrangamela State PWD road starting from NH- 27 in the district of Kamrup, Assam and meeting at Samdrupjunjkhar in Bhutan	Assam	49	30
NH 27	127E	NH27 near Barama, Baska, Subankhata, Indo/Bhutan border	Assam	55	34
NH 27	227	(NH104) NH27 near Chakia, Narhar, Pakri Bridge, Madhuban, Shivhar, Sitamarhi, Harlakhi, Umgaon, Jainagar, Laukaha, Laukahi, NH27 near Narahia	Bihar	214	133
NH 27	227A	NH27 near Chhawani, Kalwadi, Barhalanj, Barhaj, Siwan, NH27 near Chakia	Bihar	214	133
NH 27	227F	NH-227 near Chakia (Chorma chowk) connecting Pakridayal, Dhaka, Phulwaria Ghat and terminating at Bairgania near Indo / Nepal border	Bihar	44	27
NH 27	227J	NH-227 near Saharghat connecting Uchhait, Benipatti and terminating at its junction with NH-527B near Rahika	Bihar	56	35
NH 27	227L	NH-227 near Umagaon connecting Basopatti and terminating at its junction with NH-527B near Kalnahi	Bihar	26	16
NH 27	327	(NH31C) NH27 near Bagdogra, Naksal Bari, Galgalia, (NH107) Thakurganj, Bahadurganj, Araria, Raniganj, Bhargama, Tribeniganj, Pipra, Supaul, NH231 near Bangaon (Bariyahi Bazar), Birau, Benipur, NH322 near Darbhanga	West Bengal, Bihar	336	209
NH 27	327A	NH 231 near Madhepura, NH327 near Supaul, NH27 near Bhaptiahi	Bihar	61	38
NH 27	327AB	NH27 near Sakri, Benipur, baheri, Rosera, Samastipur, Taipur, NH31 near Hajipur	Bihar	184	114
NH 27	327AD	NH-327A near Saraigarh connecting Lalganj and terminating at its junction with NH-131 near Ganpatganj, Bhimpur	Bihar	39	24
NH 27	327B	NH27 near Forbesganj, NH31 near Kursela	Bihar	105	65
NH 27	327C	NH327 near Khoribari, NH27 near Bagdogra	West Bengal	31	19
NH 27	427	NH27 near Howli, Barpeta, Hajo, NH27 near Amingaon	Assam	92	57
NH 27	527	(NH57A) NH27 near Forbesganj, Jogbani	Bihar	14	8.7
NH 27	527A	NH527B near Pokhrauni Chowk, Madhubani, Rampatti, NH27 near Jhanjharpur	Bihar	28	17
NH 27	527B	(NH105) NH27 near Darbhanga, Khirma, NH27 near Jainagar	Bihar	55	34
NH 27	527C	NH27 near Majhauli, Katra, Jajuar, Pupri, NH104 near Charout	Bihar	66	41
NH 27	527D	(NH28A) NH27 near Piprakothi, Sagauli, Raxaul, Nepal border	Bihar	69	43
NH 27	527E	NH-27 (Proposed Darbhanga Bypass) near Ramnagar, Baheri, Rosera, NH31 near Begusarai	Bihar	100	62
NH 27	627	NH27 near Nelle, Rajagaon, Doyangmukh, Umrangso, Khobak, NH7 near Harangajao	Assam, Meghalaya	275	171
NH 27	627A	NH627 near Dihangi to Halflong Tinali	Assam, Meghalaya	57	35
NH 27	627B	NH27 near Bai Thanglangso, Kampur, Kathiatali, Qaziranghwa, Xiejun, Xinathong, Amoni/Ahmoni (Ahxomni)	Assam, Meghalaya, Assam	85	53
NH 27	627C	NH27 near Dongkamukam, Hojai, Nilbagan, NH29 near Bokolia	Assam, Meghalaya	69	43
NH 27	727	(NH28B) NH27 near Kushinagar, Chhitanuni Rail-cum-Road bridge, Bagaha, Lauriya, Bettiah, NH527D near Chhapwa	Uttar Pradesh, Bihar	169	105
NH 27	727A	NH27 near Gorakhpur, Deoria, Salempur, NH227 near Mairwa	Uttar Pradesh	106	66
NH 27	727AA	NH-727 near Chakni Rajwatia connecting Lagunaha, Nawalpur, Gurwalia, Gandakpur, Gopalganj	Bihar	116	72
NH 27	727AB	NH27 near Gorakhpur, Pipraich, Kaptanganj, Ghulghuli, Khadda, Baithwaliya, Jhulnipur	Uttar Pradesh	116	72
NH 27	727B	NH27 near Tamkuhi, Salempur, Belthara, Sikandarpur, NH31 near Ballia	Uttar Pradesh	140	87
NH 27	727BB	NH27 near Gorakhpur, NH730 near Partawal, Kaptanganj, NH727 at Nebua Naurangia	Uttar Pradesh	73	45
NH 27	727C	NH27 near Gorakhpur, Sikriganj, Khanipur, Auralia, Salarpur on Purvanchal Expressway	Uttar Pradesh	142	88
NH 27	727E	NH27 near Basti, Bhanpur, Utraula, NH730 near Balrampur	Uttar Pradesh	103	64
NH 27	727G	NH27 near Haraiya, Bhabhnana, Swaminarayan, Manakapur, Gonda, NH730 near Bahraich	Uttar Pradesh	139	86
NH 27	727H	NH27 near Barabanki, Dewa Sharif, Fatehpur, Mahmudabad, Biswan, Laharpur, NH730 near Lakhimpur-Kheri	Uttar Pradesh	126	78
NH 27	827	NH27 near Samariya, Fatehgarh, Guna, Aron, Sironj, NH346 near Ambanagar	Rajasthan, Madhya Pradesh	214	133
NH 27	827A	NH27 near Kelwara, Goras, Karahal, Pohari, Shivpuri	Rajasthan, Madhya Pradesh	143	89
NH 27	827B	NH27 near Chirgaon, Gursarai, Orai, Jalaun, Auraiya, Kannauj	Uttar Pradesh	239	149
NH 27	927	(NH28C) NH27 near Barabanki, Bahraich, Nepalganj (border)	Uttar Pradesh	152	94
NH 27	927A	Ratlam, Banswara, Sagwara, Dungarpur, Kherwara, Kotra, NH27 near Sawarupganj	Madhya Pradesh, Rajasthan	343	213
NH 27	927B	Pindwara, Sadri	Rajasthan	76.5	47.5
NH 27	927C	NH27 near Chitrod, Rapar, Balasar-Lodhrani, Dholavira, Dhoravar, NH341 near Khadva	Gujarat	164	102
NH 27	927CD	NH341 near Balasar-Lodhrani, Mouvana, White Rann, Santalpur, Suigam, Zero point (Dushmanpura)	Gujarat	177	110
NH 27	927D	NH27 near Dhoraji, Jamkandoma, Kalavad, Jamnagar	Gujarat	113	70
NH 27	927E	NH27 near Shihori, Patan, Unjha, Visnagar, Vijapur, NH48 near Prantij	Gujarat	153	95
NH 28		Kakrahawa on Nepalese border, Siddharthnagar, Bansi, Rudhauli, Basti, Tanda, Atraulia, Azamgarh, Katghar Lalganj, NH19 near Varanasi, NH35 near Chunar	Uttar Pradesh	358	222
NH 28	128	(NH232) NH28 near Tandav, Ambedkar Nagar, Sultanpur, Amethi, NH30 near Rae Bareli	Uttar Pradesh	171	106
NH 28	128A	NH28 near Tandav, Ambedkarnagar, Sardaha, Mohammadpur, Badshapur, NH31 near Jaunpur	Uttar Pradesh	145	90
NH 28	128B	NH28 near Azamgarh, Mau, Teekha, NH31 near Phephna (Ballia)	Uttar Pradesh	117	73
NH 28	128C	NH24 near Dohrighat, NH28 near Azamgarh, Chiriyakot, Birnon	Uttar Pradesh	104	65
NH 28	328	NH28 near Basti, Menhdawal, Karmaini (NH24 near Campierganj), NH730 near Partawal (Kaptanganj)	Uttar Pradesh	93	58
NH 28	328A	NH28 near Bansi, Menhdawal, Kahliabad, Ghanghata; Ramnagar, NH28 near Nyori	Uttar Pradesh	111	69
NH 28	328B	NH28 near Nandaur, Rudgauli, Bhanpur	Uttar Pradesh	45	28
NH 28	328C	NH28 near Tanda, NH135A near Maya	Uttar Pradesh	38	24
NH 29		(NH36) NH27 near Dabaka (Sutargaon), Amlakhi, (NH39) Dimapur, (NH150) Kohima Chizam, NH202 near Jessami	Assam, Nagaland	342	213
NH 29	129	(NH39) NH29 near Dimapur, Bokajan, Golaghat, NH715 near Numaligarh	Assam, Nagaland	105	65
NH 29	129A	NH2 near Maram, Peren, Jaluki, Pimla Junction, Razaphe Junction, NH29 near Dimapur			
NH 29	229	NH29 near Dimapur Sub-Jail, Thahekhü, Chümoukedima, NH29			
NH 29	329	NH29 near Manja, Diphu, NH27 near Lumding			
NH 29	329A	NH329 near Diphu, NH129A near Pimla Junction			
NH 30		(NH74) NH9 near Sitarganj, Pilibhit, (NH24) Bareilly, Shahjahanpur, Sitapur, (NH24B) Lucknow, (NH231) Raebareli, (NH96) Pratapgarh, (NH27) Prayagraj, Mangawan, (NH7) Rewa, Katni, (NH12A) Jabalpur, Mandla, Chilpi, (NH200) Simga, (NH43) Raipur, Dhamtari, Keskal, (NH221) Jagdalpur, Konta, Nellipaka, Bhadrachalam, Palwancha, Kothagudem, Tiruvuru, Mylavaram, NH65 near Kondapalli	Uttarakhand, Uttar Pradesh, Madhya Pradesh, Chhattisgarh, Andhra Pradesh, Telangana	2,116	1,315
NH 30	130	(NH200) NH30 near Simga, (NH111) Bilaspur, Kathgora, NH43 near Ambikapur	Chhattisgarh	293.5	182.4
NH 30	130A	NH30 near Borla-Pondi, Pandariya, Mungeli, Takhatpur, Bilaspur, Urga near Korba, Dharamjaigarh, Sisringa, NH43 near Pathalgaon	Chhattisgarh	290	180
NH 30	130AB	NH130 near Uslapur, Kotagaon, Achanakmar, Amarkantak, Pandariya, Mungeli, Takhatpur, Gadasarai, NH43 near Karonda	Chhattisgarh	162	101
NH 30	130B	NH30 near Raipur, Palari, Baloda Bazar, Kasdol, Bijaigarh, NH153 near Sarangarh	Chhattisgarh	190	120
NH 30	130C	NH30 near Abhanpur, Rajim, Gariaband, Bardula, Deobhog, NH26 near Baldhimal	Chhattisgarh, Odisha	222	138
NH 30	130CD	NH30 (Kurud Bypass), Umarda, Megha, Bijhuli, Singhpur, Dugli, Dongardula, Nagari, Sonamagar, Sihawa, Ratawa, Ghutkel, Kundei, Hatabharandi, Raighar, Beheda, Umerkote, Dhodra, Dhamanaguda, Dabugaon, NH26 near Papdahandi	Chhattisgarh, Odisha	220.5	137.0
NH 30	130D	NH-30 on Kondagaon, Narainpur, Kutul, Bingunda, Laheri, Dhodraj, Bhamragard, Hemalkasa, NH353C near Allapalli	Chhattisgarh, Maharashtra	338	210
NH 30	130E	NH-130C on Rajim, Arang, Kharora, Tilda Newra, Simga, Bilaspur, Masturi, Shivrinarayan, Birra, Dabhara, Chandrapur (Chhattisgarh)	Chhattisgarh	308	191
NH 30	130F	NH-30 on Kawardha, Khairagarh, Rajnandgaon NH930 near Kusumkasa	Chhattisgarh	173	107
NH 30	130G	NH-130 on Mungeli, Nawagarh, Bemetara, Durg, Gundardehi, NH930 near Balod	Chhattisgarh	177	110
NH 30	130H	NH-130CD on Siwaha, Kugera, Neginala, Dhamtari, Gundardehi, Rajnandgaon, Dongargaon, Ambagarh, NH930 near Khadgaon	Chhattisgarh	240	150
NH 30	230	(NH24A) NH30 near Bakshi-ka-Talab, Chenhat, junction with NH27 / NH731 / NH30 / NH27, NH30 near Bakshi-ka-Talab	Uttar Pradesh	17	11
NH 30	330	(NH96) NH30 near Prayagraj, Pratapgarh, Sultanpur, NH27 near Faizabad	Uttar Pradesh	103	64
NH 30	330A	NH30 near Rai Bareili, Jagdishpur, NH27 near Faizabad			
NH 30	330B	NH330 near Gonda, NH927 near Jarwal			
NH 30	330D	NH30 near Sitapur, Misrikh, Baghauli, Hardoi, Bilgram, NH34 near Kannauj		134.8	83.8
NH 30	530	(NH24) NH109 near Pantnagar, NH9 at Khatima, NH30 near Bareily, NH9 near Rampur	Uttar Pradesh	140	87
NH 30	530B	(NH30 near Bareilly, Budaun,) Sikandra Rao, Hathras, NH44 near Mathura		79.3	127.6
NH 30	730	NH30 near Pilibhit, Puranpur, Khutar, Gola Gokaran Nath, Lakhimpur, Isanagar, Nanpara, Bahraich, Shravasti, Balrampur, Tulsipur, Barhni, Shohratgarh, Siddharthnagar, Pharenda, Maharajganj, Partawal, Kaptanganj, Padrauna, NH27 near Tamkuhiraj	Uttar Pradesh	519	322
NH 30	730A	NH730 near Puranpur - Pawayan - NH30 near Maikalganj			
NH 30	730B	NH30 near Bareilly, Bhutah, NH731K near Bisalpur		35.4	22.0
NH 30	730C	NH730B near Bisalpur, Miranpur Katra, Fatehgarh, NH34 near Bewar			
NH 30	730H	NH730 near Kudwa, Mihinpurwa, Motipur, Nishangarh, Bichia, Katarnian Ghat, Girijapuri, Manjra Purab, Tikunia, Belraya, Uttari Nighasan, Chitwan Nepal Border	Uttar Pradesh	100	62
NH 30	730S	NH730 near Maharajganj, Nichlaul, Thuthibari, Nautanwa	Uttar Pradesh	69	43
NH 30	930	NH30 near Purur, Balod, Kusumkasa, Kumhari, Manpur, Muramgaon, Dhanora, Gadchiroli, Mul, Chandrapur, Warora, Wani, NH44 near Karanji	Maharashtra	211	131
NH 30	930D	NH930 near Chandarpur, Visapur, Ballarpur, Bamni, Rajura, Warur, Dewada, Lakkdkot, Maharashtra/Telangana Border	Maharashtra, Telangana	233	145
NH 31		(NH232A) NH27 near Unnao, (NH232) Lalganj, (NH231) Raebareli, Salon, Pratapgarh, Machhlishahr, (NH56) Jaunpur, (NH29) Varanasi, (NH19) Ghazipur, Ballia, Chhapra, (NH30) Hajipur, (NH31) Bakhtiyarpur, Mokama, Begusarai, Khagaria, Bihpur, Naugachia, Gosaingaon, Kursela, Kora, Katihar, Harishchanderpur, Tulsihata, Chanchal, Samsi, NH12 near Gazole	Uttar Pradesh, Bihar, West Bengal	991.9	616.3
NH 31	131	(NH106) NH31 near Bihpur, Kishanganj, Madhepura, Birpur (border)	Bihar	132	82
NH 31	131A	Malda, Ratua, Debipur, Ahmedabad, Manihari, Katihar (NH31), NH27 near Purnia in the state of Bihar			
NH 31	131B	NH-31 near Naughachia and terminating at its junction with NH-33 near Bhagalpur	Bihar		
NH 31	131G	NH-31 near Dighwara, Sherpur, Kanhauli, Ramnagar (Patna Ring Road)	Bihar		
NH 31	231	(NH107) NH31 near Maheshkund, Sonbarsa Raj, Simri Bakhtiyarpur, Saharsa, Madhepura, Sarsi, (NH31) Purnia, NH31 near Kora	Bihar	196	122
NH 31	331	(NH101) NH31 near Chhapra, Baniapur, NH27 near Muhumadpur	Bihar	65	40
NH 31	431	(NH30A) NH31 near Phatuha, Chandi, Harnaut, NH31 near Barh	Bihar	70	43
NH 31	531	(NH85) NH31 near Chhapra, Siwan, NH27 near Gopalganj	Bihar	93	58
NH 31	731	(NH56) NH31 near Jaunpur, Sultanpur, NH27 near Lucknow	UttarPradesh	221	137
NH 31	731A	NH32 near Pratapgarh, Jethwada, Shrangverpur, Manjhanpur, Rajapur, NH35 near Chitrakoot			
NH 31	731AG	NH35 near Raipura, NH731A near Rajapur, Kamsin, baberu, Banda	Uttar Pradesh	106	66
NH 31	731B	NH-31 near Machhlishahar connecting Janghai, Durgaganj, Bhadohi, Kapsethi and terminating at its junction with Lahartara- Mohansaray road (ODR) near Varanasi	Uttar Pradesh	100	62
NH 31	731K	NH731 near Shahjahanpur, Bisalpur, Barkheda, NH30 near Pilibhit		81.0	50.3
NH 31	931	NH31 near Jagdishpur, Musafirkhana, Gauriganj, Amethi, NH330 near Pratapgarh			
NH 31	931A	NH330A near Jagdishpur, Jais, NH31 near Salon			
NH 32		(NH45) NH48 near Chennai, Chengalpattu, (NH66) Tindivanam, (NH45A) Puducherry, Cuddalore, Chidambaram, Karaikal, (Puducherry), NH83 near Nagapatinam, Thiruthuraipoondi, Thondi, Ramanathapuram, NH38 near Thoothukudi	Tamil Nadu, Puducherry	657	408
NH 32	132	NH32 near Puducherry, NH48 near Kanchipuram	Puducherry, Tamil Nadu	121	75
NH 32	132B	NH332A near Sadras, NH32 near Chengalpattu, NH48 near Kanchipuram	Tamil Nadu	67	42
NH 32	332	(NH45A) NH32 near Puducherry, NH38 near Viluppuram	Tamil Nadu, Puducherry	38	24
NH 32	332A	NH32 near Puducherry, Kadalur, Mahabalipuram, Adyar, NH16 near Chennai	Tamil Nadu, Puducherry	152	94
NH 32	532	(NH45A) NH32 near Cuddalore, Vadalur, Neyveli, Virudachalam, NH38 Veppur, NH79 near Chinasalem	Tamil Nadu	126	78
NH 32	732	(NH45A) NH32 near Karaikal, Peralam, Kumbakonam, Thiruvaiyaru, NH81 near Thayippakulam	Tamil Nadu, Puducherry	145	90
NH 32	932	(NH45A) NH32 near Nagore, Nannilam, Kumbakonam|Tamil Nadu	60	37	
NH 33		(NH110) NH19 near Dehri-on-Sone, Nasriganj, Sonebad, Arwal, Jehanabad, Bandhuganj, Ekangarsarai, (NH82) Biharsharif, (NH80) Mokama, Luckeesarai, Munger, Bhagalpur, Kahalgaon, Sahibganj, Rajmahal, Barharwa, NH12 near Farakka	Bihar, West Bengal	530	330
NH 33	133	NH33 near Pirpainti, Godda, NH114A near Choupa More	Jharkhand	138	86
NH 33	133A	NH33 near Barharwa, Pakur, NH12 near Nimtala	Jharkhand, West Bengal	52	32
NH 33	133B	NH33 near Sahibganj, NH114A near Dumka, NH419 near Jamtara	Jharkhand	222.5	138.3
NH 33	133E	NH-33 near Bhagalpur connecting Dhaka More and terminating at NH114A at Dumka in Jharkhand	Bihar, Jharkhand	116	72
NH 33	233	NH33 near Sultanganj, Sangrampur, Katoria, NH114A near Deoghar	Bihar, Jharkhand	117	73
NH 33	333	NH33 near Bariyarpur, Kharagpur, Laxmipur, Jamui, Chakai, NH114A in Devgarh	Bihar, Jharkhand	157	98
NH 33	333A	NH33 near Barbigha, Sheikhpura, Sikandra, Jamui, JhaJha, Banka, Godda, NH133A near Hiranpur	Bihar, Jharkhand	285	177
NH 33	333B	NH33 near Munger, NH31 near Khagaria, Alauli, Bithan, Hasanpur, Kusheswarasthan, NH327 near Biraul	Bihar	106	66
NH 33	333C	NH333 near Chakai and terminating at Giridih	Bihar, Jharkhand	68	42
NH 33	333D	NH33 near Jehanabad, Islampur/Magadh, Rajgir, Hisua, Nawada, Bhaluahi-Garhibandh, Sikandara and terminating at Lakhisarai	Bihar, Jharkhand	216	134
NH 33	333E	NH33 near Barbigha, Warisalganj, Nawada, Fatehpur, Gawan, Chatro	Bihar, Jharkhand	162	101
NH 33	433	NH33 near Lakhisarai, Jamui, Sikandara, NH20 near Nawada	Bihar, Jharkhand	104	65
NH 33	533	NH33 near Kinjar, Panchananpur, Kalwan, Sherghatti, Imamganj, Chhatarpur	Bihar, Jharkhand	175	109
NH 33	533A	NH33 near Kinjar, Paliganj, Bikram, Bihta	Bihar	50	31
NH 33	733	NH33 near Arwal, Sandesh, Koilwar, Babura, Arrah-Chhapra Bridge, NH31 near Chirand	Bihar, Jharkhand	68	42
NH 34		(NH108) Gangotri Dham, Bhatwari, Uttarkashi, (NH94) Dharasu, nearTerhi, Ampata, (NH58) Rishikesh, (NH74) Haridwar, (NH119) Najibabad, Bijnore, (NH58) Meerut, (NH91) Ghaziabad, Bulandshahr, Aligarh, Etah, Kannauj, (NH86) Kanpur, Hamirpur, Mahoba, Chattarpur, (NH12A) Hirapur, Damoh, (NH7) Jabalpur, NH44 near Lakhnadon	Uttarakhand, Uttar Pradesh, Madhya Pradesh	1,600	990
NH 34	134	(NH94) NH34 near Dharasu, Kuthnaur, Yamnotri	Uttarakhand	94	58
NH 34	234	(NH91A) NH34 near Kannauj, Bela, (NH92) Etawah, Kishni, NH34 near Bhongaon	Uttar Pradesh	156	97
NH 34	334	(NH58) NH334 near Haridwar, Roorkee, Muzaffarnagar, (NH235) Meerut, Hapur, NH34 near Bulandshar	Uttarakhand, Uttar Pradesh	207	129
NH 34	334A	NH34 near Haridwar, Luxer, Purkaji			
NH 34	334B	NH34 near Meerut, Sonipat, Kharkhauda, Sampla, Jhajjar, Charkhi Dadri, NH709 near Loharu	Uttar Pradesh, Haryana	240	150
NH 34	334C	NH34 near Bulandshahar, NH9 near Ghaziabad			
NH 34	334D	NH34 near Aligarh, Khair, Jewar, NH44 near Palwal		75.8	47.1
NH 34	334DD	NH-334D near Hamidpur and connecting Jewar, Jhajhar, Kakod, Dhanaura and terminating at its junction with NH-34 near Bulandshahar	Uttar Pradesh	46.66	28.99
NH 34	534	(NH119) NH34 near Najibabad, Kotdwar, Satpauli, Bubakhal	Uttarakhand, Uttar Pradesh	151	94
NH 34	734	(NH74) NH34 near Najibabad, Nagina, NH309 near Kashipur	Uttar Pradesh, Uttarakhand	108	67
NH 34	934	(NH86) NH34 near Hirapur, Banda, (NH26A) Sagar, Jeruwakhera, Khurai, Bina, Sironj, Karahiya	Madhya Pradesh	265	165
NH 34	934A	NH34 near Lakhnadon, Ghansor, Mandla, Kundam, Sihora, Ramgada	Madhya Pradesh	332	206
NH 34	934B	NH934A near Mandla, Shahpura East, Umaria, Dhamokhar, Khanna Banjari, NH30 near Maihar	Madhya Pradesh	255	158
NH 35		(NH76) NH34 near Kabrai, Banda, Karwi, Mau, Prayagraj, (NH7) Mirzapur, NH19 near Varanasi	Uttar Pradesh	361	224
NH 35	135	(NH7) NH35 near Mirzapur, Lalganj, Drummondganj, Mauganj, NH30 near Mangawan	Madhya Pradesh, Uttar Pradesh	130	81
NH 35	135A	NH35 near Mirzapur, Aura, Bhadohi, Jaunpur, Shahganj Akbarpur, NH27 near Ayodhya	Uttar Pradesh	209.7	130.3
NH 35	135B	NH35 near Raipura, Sarainya, Manikpur, NH135BG near Pindra	Uttar Pradesh, Madhya Pradesh	60	37
NH 35	135BB	NH35 (Bargarh More) near Jamira, Bargarh, Gahur, Dubi, Magdaur, NH135B near Dabhoura, Sirmaur, NH30 & NH39 near Rewa	Madhya Pradesh	98.3	61.1
NH 35	135BD	NH30 near Kalwari, Sirmaur, Semariya, Satna	Madhya Pradesh	107	66
NH 35	135BG	NH35 near Ahmadganj, Chitrakoot, Majhgawa, NH39 near Satna, NH30 near Maihar	Uttar Pradesh, Madhya Pradesh	126	78
NH 35	135C	NH35 near Prayagraj, Koraon, Drumanodganj, Haliya, Awadhadam, Pipra, Manigarha, Karondiya, Bagdara, Chtrangi, Singrauli, NH39 near Waidhan	Uttar Pradesh	166.7	103.6
NH 35	335	(NH232) NH35 near Banda, Fatehpur, NH31 near Lalganj	Madhya Pradesh, Uttar Pradesh	110	68
NH 35	535	NH35 near Atarra, NH335 near Fatehpur	Uttar Pradesh	78	48
NH 36		(NH45C) NH132 near Vikravandi, Panruti Vadulur, Neyveli-Township, Sethiathop, Kumbakonam, (NH226) Thanjavur, Gandarvakottai, (NH210) Pudukottai, (NH226) Tirumayam, Kilasevalpatti, Tirupattur, Madagupatti, Sivaganga, NH87 near Manamadurai	Tamil Nadu	352	219
NH 36	136	(NH226) NH36 near Thanjavur, Thiruvaiyaru, Kunnam, Perali, NH38 near Perambalur	Tamil Nadu	68	42
NH 36	136B	NH36 near Kumbakonam, NH32 near Sirkazhi		52.8	32.8
NH 36	336	(NH210) NH36 near Pudukkottai, Kiranur, NH83 near Tiruchirappalli	Tamil Nadu	52	32
NH 36	536	(NH210) NH36 near Tirumayam, Devakottai, Tiruvadanai, NH87 near Ramanathapuram	Tamil Nadu	109	68
NH 37		(NH53) NH2 near Imphal, Jiribam, Jirighat, Lakhipur, Silchar, (NH44) Badarpur, Karimganj border	Assam, Manipur	324	201
NH 37	137	Tamenglong (Tenglong), Khongsang, NH37 near Rengpang			
NH 37	137A	Wahengbam Leikai, Hiyangthang, Wangol, Mayang Imphal, Wabagai, Kakching, Tamenglong (Tenglong), NH102 near Kakching			
NH 38		(NH234) NH75 near Vellore, Polur, Tiruvannamalai, (NH45) Viluppuram, Ulundurpettai, Perambalur, (NH45B) Tiruchchirappali, Tovarankurichchi, Melur, Madurai, Aruppukkottai, NH138 near Tuticorin Port	Tamil Nadu	640	400
NH 38	138	(NH7A) NH38 near Tuticorin Port, NH44 near Tirunelveli	Tamil Nadu	51.65	32.09
NH 38	338	NH38 near Melur, NH536 near Karaikkudi	Tamil Nadu	56.5	35.1
NH 38	538	NH38 near Melur, Sivaganga, NH87 near Ramanathapuram	Tamil Nadu	105	65
NH 39		(NH75) NH44 near Jhansi, Chhatarpur, Khajuraho, Panna, Satna, Rewa, Sidhi, {singrauli}, Dudhinagar, Garhwa, Daltonganj, Latehar, Chandwa, NH20 near Ranchi	Madhya Pradesh, Uttar Pradesh, Jharkhand	900	560
NH 39	139	(NH98) NH39 near Rajhara, Chhatarpur, Hariharganj, Aurangabad, Daudnagar, Arwal, Naubatpur, NH31 near Patna	Bihar, Jharkhand	240	150
NH 39	239	NH39 near Dudhinagar, Modanwal, Miurpur, Nadira, Bakhriwan, Bijpur, Baidhan, NH39 near Majan	Jharkhand, Uttar Pradesh	100	62
NH 39	339	NH39 near Nowgong, Mahoba, Kulpahar, Panwari, Rath, NH27 near Orai	Madhya Pradesh, Uttar Pradesh	184	114
NH 39	339A	NH39 near Rantola, Miurpur, Babhani, Basantpur, Ghat Pendari, Bhaisamunda, Ambikapur	Uttar Pradesh, Madhya Pradesh	159	99
NH 39	339B	NH39 near Bamitha, Khajuraho	Madhya Pradesh	59	37 (now included in NH34)
NH 39	339C	NH39 near Dudhinagar, NH343 at Ramanujganj	Uttar Pradesh, Chhattisgarh	78	48
NH 39	539	NH39 near Jhansi, Pirthipur, Tikamgarh, NH934 near Shahgarh	Madhya Pradesh	173	107
NH 39	739	NH39 near Renukoot, Hathinala, Chopan, Markundi, Robertsganj, NH35 near Narayanpur Varanasi	Uttar Pradesh	135	84
NH 39	939	NH39 near Garhwa, Bishrampur-Pandu, Pandeypura, Mohammadganj, Japla, Dangwar, NH19 near Shahgarh	Jharkhand, Bihar	104	65
NH 40		(NH18) NH44 near Kurnool, Nandyal, Cuddapah, Pileru, Putalapattu, Chittoor, NH48 near Ranipettai	Andhra Pradesh	420	260
NH 40	140	NH40 near Putalpattu, NH71 near Renigunta	Andhra Pradesh	70	43
NH 40	240	NH44 near Kurnool, Kodumur, Alur, NH67 near Ballari	Andhra Pradesh, Karnataka	148	92
NH 40	340	NH40 near Rayachoti, Chinnamandem, Gurrramkonda, NH42 near Kurabalakota	Andhra Pradesh	61	38
NH 40	340C	NH40 near Kurnool, Nandikotkur, Atmakur, NH765 near Dornala	Andhra Pradesh	135	84
NH 40	440	Rayachoti, Vempali, Yerraguntla, Prodattur, Chagalamarri, Rudravaram, Gajulapalli, Nandyal	Andhra Pradesh	215	134
NH 40	540	Mahanandi, Nandyal on NH40, Gadivemula, Nandikotkur, Sri Sailam Dam	Andhra Pradesh, Telangana	103	64
NH 41		(NH8A) NH41 near Samakhiyali, Gandhidham, Mandvi, Naliya, Narayan Sarovar	Gujarat	324	201
NH 41	141	(NH8A) NH41 near Gandhidham, Kandla Port	Gujarat	36	22
NH 41	341	NH41 near Bhimsar, Anjar, Bhuj, Khavda, Dharmshala	Gujarat	108	67
NH 42		(NH67) Near Ballari (Karnataka), Anantapur (NH44), Kadiri, (NH219) Madanapalli, Kuppam, NH44 near Krishnagiri	Karnataka, Andhra Pradesh, Tamil Nadu	361	224
NH 42	142	NH42 near Kadiri, Rayachoti, Rajampet, Rapur, Gudur	Andhra Pradesh	223	139
NH 42	342	NH42 near Mudigubba, Puttaparthi, Gauribidanur, Yelahanka	Karnataka, Andhra Pradesh	193	120
NH 42	542	NH42 near Madanapalle, Chintamani, NH75 near Hoskote	Andhra Pradesh, Karnataka	104	65
NH 43		(NH78) NH30 near Gulganj, Katni, Umaria, Shahdol, Ambikapur, Pathalgaon, Jashpurnagar, Gumla (NH23) (NH33) Ranchi, NH18 near Chandil	Madhya Pradesh, Chhattisgarh, Jharkhand	900	560
NH 43	143	(NH23) NH43 near Gumla, Palkot, Kolebira, Thethaitanagar, Jharkhand, Panposh, Rajamundra, NH49 near Barakot	Jharkhand, Odisha	247	153
NH 43	143A	NH43 near Gumla, Ghaghra, Lohardaga, NH39 near Kuru			
NH 43	143AG	NH-143A near Lohardaga connecting Bhandra, Bero, Karra, Khunti and terminating at its junction with NH-43 near Tamar	Jharkhand	134.5	83.6
NH 43	143B	NH-43 near Jashpurnagar in the state of Chhattisgarh connecting Gobindpur, Dumri and terminating near Mahuandanr in the state of Jharkhand	Chhattisgarh, Jharkhand	67.8	42.1
NH 43	143D	NH143 near Jamtoli, Basia, Kamadara, Torpa, NH20 near Khunthi		81.7	50.8
NH 43	143H	NH143 near Joram, Ambapani, Salangabahal, Bihabandh, Litebeda	Jharkhand	35.0	21.7
NH 43	243	NH43 near Shahdol, Jaisinghnagar, Beohari, Rewa	Madhya Pradesh	170.1	105.7
NH 43	243A	NH43 near Katni, Barhi, Panpatha, Tala (Bandhavgarh), Guruwahi Manpur, Jaisinghnagar,	Madhya Pradesh	156	97
NH 43	343	NH43 near Ambikapur, Semarsot, Ramanujganj, Ranka Kalan, NH39 near Garhwa	Chhattisgarh, Jharkhand	158.0	98.2
NH 43	343A	NH43 near Ambikapur, Pratappur, Shankargarh, Kusumi NH143B near Manora	Chhattisgarh	179.0	111.2
NH 43	343B	NH339A near Bhaisamunda, Bhaiyathan, Surajpur, Madanpur, Badesalhi, Korbi, NH130 near Baniya	Chhattisgarh	137	85
NH 43	543	NH43 near Shahdol, Dindori, Mandla, Nainpur, Lamta, Balaghat, Rajegaon, Dhamangaon, Rawandi, Gondia, Amgaon, Deori, Korchi, Kurkheda, Wadsa Desaiganj, NH353D near Bramhapuri	Madhya Pradesh, Maharashtra	510	320
NH 43	743	NH43 near Amanganj, NH39 near Panna, Ajaigarh, NH943 near Naraini	Madhya Pradesh, Uttar Pradesh	114	71
NH 43	943	NH43 near Pawai, Saleha (Jaso) Jassu, NH39 near Nagod, Kalinjar, Naraini, NH35 near Atarra	Madhya Pradesh, Uttar Pradesh	166	103
NH 44		(NH1A) Srinagar, Jammu, Pathankot, (NH1) Jalandar, Ludhiana, Ambala, Karnal, Panipat, (NH2) Delhi, Faridabad, Mathura, (NH3) Agra, (NH75) Gwalior, (NH26) Jhansi, Lalitpur, Sagar, Narsinghpur, Lakhnadon, (NH7) Seoni, Nagpur, Hyderabad, Kurnool, Anantapur, Bengaluru, Dharmapuri, Salem, Madurai, Kanyakumari	Jammu and Kashmir, Himachal Pradesh, Punjab, Haryana, Delhi, Uttar Pradesh, Madhya Pradesh, Maharashtra, Telangana, Andhra Pradesh, Karnataka, Tamil Nadu	3,745	2,327
NH 44	144	(NH1C) NH44 near Domel, Katra	Jammu and Kashmir	15	9.3
NH 44	144A	NH44 in Jammu, Akhnur, Naoshera, Rajauri, Punch	Jammu and Kashmir	230	140
NH 44	244	(NH1B) NH44 near Khanabal, Symthanpass, Kishtwar, Doda, NH44 near Batote	Jammu and Kashmir	246	153
NH 44	344	(NH72) NH44 near Ambala, (NH73) Dhanana, Saha, Yamunanagar, Saharanpur, NH334 near Roorkee	Punjab, Haryana, Uttarakhand	173	107
NH 44	344A	NH44 near Phagwara, Banga, Nawanshahr, Balachur, NH205 near Rupnagar	Punjab, India	88	55
NH 44	344B	NH44 near Phagwara, NH3 near Hoshiarpur	Punjab, India	38	24
NH 44	344M	NH44 near Bankoli Village, Narela, Mundka, Najafgarh, Dwarka, NH248BB near Bhartal Chowk	Delhi		
NH 44	344N	NH-344M near Dichaun Kalan in NCT of Delhi and terminating at its junction with NH-9 near Balaur village (Bahadurgarh Bypass) in the state of Haryana	Delhi, Haryana		
NH 44	344P	NH-344M near Bawana Industrial Area in NCT of Delhi and terminating at its junction with NH-352A near Barwasini village (Sonipat) in the state of Haryana	Delhi, Haryana		
NH 44	444	NH1 in Srinagar, Badgam, Pulwama, Shupiyan, Kulgam, NH44 near Quazigund	Jammu and Kashmir	105	65
NH 44	444A	NH44 near Ambala, Saha, NH44 near Sahabad	Haryana	42	26
NH 44	544	(NH47) NH44 near Salem, Coimbatore, Palakkad, Thrissur, NH66 near Ernakulum	Kerala, Tamil Nadu	332	206
NH 44	544D	NH44 near Anantapur, Tadipatri, Kolimigundla, Owk, Banaganapalli, Giddalur, Cumbum, Thokapalli, Vinukonda, Narasaraopet, NH16 near Guntur	Andhra Pradesh	417	259
NH 44	544DD	NH44 near Anantapur, Rayadurg, NH150A near Molakalmuru	Andhra Pradesh, Karnataka	81.6	50.7
NH 44	544E	NH44 near Kodikonda checkpost, Lepakshi, Hindupur, Madakasira, Rolla, Agali, NH48 near Sira	Andhra Pradesh, Karnataka	119.5	74.3
NH 44	544F	NH-44 near Maruru (Raptadu) connecting Itukalapalli, Husenapuram (Tadipatri), Nagireddipalli, Nallagatla, Diddalur, Kagitaalagudem (Cumbum), Rayayaram, Nuzendla, Kommalapadu, Kavuru, Phirangipuram, Medikonduru, Velavarthipadu and terminating at its junction with Vijaywada Inner Ring Road near Pedda Parimi	Andhra Pradesh		
NH 44	544H	NH44 near Thoppur, Mecheri, Mettur, Bhavani, Erode	Tamil Nadu	94	58
NH 44	744	(NH208) NH44 near Tirumangalum, Srivilliputtur, Rajapalaiyam, Tenkasi, Puliyur, Punalur, Kottarakara, Kundara, Kadappakada, NH66 Chinnakada near Kollam	Kerala, Tamil Nadu	238	148
NH 44	744A	NH-744 near Alampatti connecting Vadagarai, Nedummadurai, Eliyarpathi, Erukkilaivellur, Kondagai, Manalur, Kunnathur, Parayankulam, Thamaraipatti, Iraniyam, Usilampatti, Kulamangalam, Kalvellipatti, Tatampatti and terminating at its junction with NH-44 near Vadipatti in the state of Tamil Nadu (Madurai Ring Road)			
NH 44	844	NH44 near Hosur, NH44 near Adiyamankottai		110	68
NH 44	944	(NH47B) NH44 near Kavalkinaru, Aralvaymozhi, NH66 near Nagercoil	Tamil Nadu	23	14
NH 45		NH46 near Obaidullaganj, Bareli, Udaipura, Tendukheda, Rajmarg, Shahpura (Bhitoni) NH30 near Jabalpur, Dindori, Karonda, Bajang Mal, Kukdur, Pandariya, Lorhmi, Ratanpur, NH130 in Bilaspur	Madhya Pradesh, Chhattisgarh	652	405
NH 45	145	NH45 near Shahpura, Narsinghpur, Gadarwara, Pipariya, Tawa Bridge (Bobai) NH46 near Itarsi	Madhya Pradesh	235	146
NH 45	245	NH45 near Udaipura, Silwani, Jaisinagar, Rahatgarh, Khurai, Malthone near NH44	Madhya Pradesh	209	130
NH 45	345	NH146 near Raisen, Sultanpur Jod near NH45, Bari, Bareli, Batera, Silwani	Madhya Pradesh	140	87
NH 45	545	NH45 near Bareli, Aliganj-Sandiya, Pipariya, Matkuli, Tamia Ghat, Parasia, Palatwara Shivpuria, Narsingpur Ring Road on NH547	Madhya Pradesh	184	114
NH 46		(NH3) NH44 near Gwalior, Shivpuri, Guna, (NH12) Biora, Bhopal, (NH69) Obeddullaganj, Hoshangabad, Itarsi, NH47 near Betul	Madhya Pradesh	625	388
NH 46	146	(NH86) NH52 near Dewas, Ashta, Sehore, NH46 near Bhopal, Vidisha, NH44 near Sagar	Madhya Pradesh	216	134
NH 46	146A	NH46 near Vidisha Square, Salamatpur, Raisen, Gairatganj, Begumganj, near Rahatgarh	Madhya Pradesh	151	94
NH 46	146B	NH46 near Budhni, Kosmi, Rehti, Nasrullahganj, Khategaon, Satwas, Udainagar, Barwaha	Madhya Pradesh	235	146
NH 46	146C	NH46 near Lukwasa, Isagarh, Chanderi, NH44 near Latlitpur	Madhya Pradesh	129	80
NH 46	146D	NH46 near Guna, Pilighat, Ashoknagar, Mungaoli	Madhya Pradesh	96	60
NH 46	146E	NH46 near Kumbhraj, Maksudangarh, Narsinghgarh, Sehore, Nasrullaganj	Madhya Pradesh	244	152
NH 46	246	NH46 near Baretha, Ghoradongri, Damua, Parasia, Chhindwara, Seoni, Nainpur near NH543	Madhya Pradesh	302.7	188.1
NH 46	346	NH46 near Jharkheda, Berasia, Vidisha, Kurwai, Mungawali, Chanderi	Madhya Pradesh	152	94
NH 46	546	NH46 near Narmadapuram, Hoshangabad, Seoni-Malwa, Harda, New Harsud, NH347B near Ashapura	Madhya Pradesh	160	99
NH 47		(NH8A) NH27 near Bamanbore, Limbdi, (NH59) Ahmedabad, Godhra, Dahod, (NH59A) Indore, Harda (NH69) Betul, Saoner, NH44 near Nagpur	Gujarat, Madhya Pradesh, Maharashtra	1,098	682
NH 47	147	(NH8C) NH47 near Doliya, Surendranagar, Viramgam, Sanand, Sarkhej, Gandhinagar, NH48 near Chilloda	Gujarat	217	135
NH 47	147A	NH47 near Godhra, Lunavada, Modasa, NH48 near Javanpura	Gujarat	116	72
NH 47	147B	NH147D near Talava, Dahod, Bordi, Rambhapur, Meghnagar, NH147E near Kalyanpura	Gujarat	84.4	52.4
NH 47	147C	NH47 near Godhra, Baroda, Dabhoi, Tilakvada, NH56 near Devaliya	Gujarat	157	98
NH 47	147D	NH-47 near Limkheda, Limdi, Talava, Thandla, Petlavad, Badnawar	Gujarat, Madhya Pradesh	157	98
NH 47	147E	NH47 near Jhabua (Bypass), Nawagaon, Raipuriya, Bamania, Ratlam, Jaora, NH 156 near Mandsaur	Gujarat	202	126
NH 47	247	NH47 near Dahegaon, Kamthi, Kuhi, Umred, Bhiwapur, Paoni, Adhyal, Pahela, Bhandara, NH753 near Ramtek	Maharashtra		
NH 47	347	(NH69A) NH47 near Multai, Chhindwara, NH44 near Seoni	Madhya Pradesh	169	105
NH 47	347A	NH47 near Multai, Warud, Ashti, Arvi, Pulgaon, Wardha, Sevagram, Sonegaon, Hinganghat, Jamb, NH930 near Warora	Madhya Pradesh, Maharashtra	265	165
NH 47	347B	NH-47 near Kheri, Asapur (excluding stretch from Ashapur to Khandwa) Khandwa, Chhegaon Makhan (excluding stretch from Chhegaon Makhan to Deshgaon ) Deshgaon, Khargone, Julwania, Thikri, Anjad, Barwani, Dahi	Madhya Pradesh	298	185
NH 47	347BG	NH753L near Asirgarh, Dhulkot, Paldhana, Deshgaon, Sanawad, Barwah, NH52 (Bhawarkua Chowk) at Indore	Madhya Pradesh, Maharashtra	175	109
NH 47	347C	NH47 near Dhar, Gujri, Kalghat, Kasarwad, Khargone, Bistan, Baner, Palpadlya, Raver, Burhanpur	Madhya Pradesh, Maharashtra	281	175
NH 47	547	(NH26B) NH47 near Saoner, Chhindwara, NH44 near Narsinghpur	Maharashtra, Madhya Pradesh	215	134
NH 47	547C	NH47 near Betul, Gudgaon, Dhotarkheda, NH753AB near Akot	Madhya Pradesh, Maharashtra	162	101
NH 47	547D	NH347B near Khandwa, Dedhtalai, Dharni, Harisal, Gavilgarh, NH53 near Amaravati	Madhya Pradesh, Maharashtra	225	140
NH 47	547E	NH44 near Saoner, Dhapewada, Kalmeshwar, NH361 near Wardha	Maharashtra	100	62
NH 47	647	NH53 near Amravati, Arvi, Pavnar, NH361 near Wardha	Maharashtra	111	69
NH 47	747	NH347B near Khandwa, Mundi, Punasa, Narmada Wildlife Sanctuary, Satwas, Kannod, NH146 near Ashta	Madhya Pradesh	182	113
NH 47	947	NH47 near Bagodara, Nalsarovar, Viramgam, NH68 near Chanasma	Gujarat	145	90
NH 48		(NH8) Delhi, Bawal, Kotpuli, Jaipur, (NH79A) Kishangarh, (NH79) Nasirabad, (NH76) Chittorgarh, (NH8) Udaipur, Ahmedabad, Vadodara, Ankleshwar, (NH53) Surat, (NH3) Mumbai, (NH4) Thane, Pune, Satara, Karad, Kolhapur, Belagavi, Dharwad, Hubballi, Davangere Chitradurga, Tumakuru, (NH7) Bengaluru, (NH46) Krishnagiri, (NH4) Vellore, Chennai	Delhi, Haryana, Rajasthan, Gujarat, Maharashtra, Karnataka, Tamil Nadu	2,916	1,812
NH 48	148	(NH11A) NH48 near Manoharpur, Dausa, NH23 near Lalsot	Rajasthan	105	65
NH 48	148A	(NH236) NH48 near Gurgaon, Chhatarpur T-point, Andheria More, Mahrauli in Delhi	Delhi, Haryana	14	8.7
NH 48	148AE	NH48 near Shiv Murti (Rangpuri), Nelson Mandela Marg near Vasant Kunj in the NCT of Delhi			
NH 48	148B	NH48 near Kot Putli, Narnaul, Mahendergarh, Charkhi Dadri, Bhiwani, Hansi, Barwala, Mansa, Bathinda			
NH 48	148BB	NH148B near Moonak, Lehra Gaga, Sunam	Punjab	37.7	23.4
NH 48	148C	NH 48 at Km 280.300 intersecting NH-52 and terminating at its junction with NH-21 at km 222.750	Rajasthan	47	29
NH 48	148D	NH58 near Bheem, Parasoli, NH48/Gulabpura, Shahpura, Jahajpur, Shahpura, Hindoli, Nainwa, NH552 near Uniara			
NH 48	148M	NH-48 near Vadodara connecting Bhaili, Samiyala, Laxmipura, Sangam, Padra, Dabhasa, Mahuvad, Kinkhlod, Pakiza Society in Borsad, Nisraya, Alarsa, Kosindra Indiranagar and terminating at Anklav in the state of Gujarat		51.3	31.9
NH 48	148N	NH-48 near Dodka (Vadodara) connecting Godhra, Dahod in the state of Gujarat, Ratlam, Jaora in the state of Madhya Pradesh, Jhalawar, Kota, Sawai Madhopur, Lalsot, Dausa in the state of Rajasthan, Firozpur Jhirka and terminating at its junction with NH-248A near Sohna	Haryana, Rajasthan, Madhya Pradesh, Gujarat		
NH 48	148NA	NH-148N near KMP Expressway connecting Kail Gaon, Ballabhgarh, Faridabad in the state of Haryana, New Agra Canal near Kalindi Kunj, DND Maharani Bagh and terminating at its junction with NH-9 near Sarai Kale Khan in the UT of Delhi	Haryana, Delhi		
NH 48	148NG	NH-148N near Garoth Ujjain including spur of 3.200 km towards Badnewar and a spur of 7 km towards Dewas and terminating at its junction with NH-52 near Kshipra Bridge (Village Lohar Piplia)	Madhya Pradesh		
NH 48	248	(NH11C) old NH8 through Jaipur from km220 to km 273.50	Rajasthan	53	33
NH 48	248A	NH48 near Sahpura, Alwar, Ramgarh, Nuh NH48 near Gurgaon			
NH 48	348	(NH4B) NH48 near Palspe, Jawaharlal Nehru Port	Maharashtra	28	17
NH 48	348A	NH348 near Jawahar Lal Nehru Port Trust, Gavanphata, Palm Beach Road			
NH 48	348B	NH348 near Ulwe (Padeghar), Hambhulpad, Kauli Belodak, Chirner, Sai, NH66 near Raigad (Barapada)		19.2	11.9
NH 48	448	(NH8) NH48 near Kishangarh, (NH79) Ajmer, NH48 near Nasirabad	Rajasthan	57	35
NH 48	548	NH66 near Kalamboi, NH348 at km 16.687 Nasirabad	Maharashtra	5	3.1
NH 48	548A	NH848A near Shahapur, Murbad, Karjat, Khalapur, Pali, Tale, Manmad, Agardanda	Maharashtra	57	35
NH 48	548B	NH548C near Mantha, Deogoan Fata, Selu, Pathari, Sonpeth, Parali Vaijnath, Ambajogai, Renapurphata, Latur (NH361), Ausa, Omarga, Yenegur, Murum, Alur, Akkalkot, Nagasur, NH52 Karnataka border, Almel, Indi, Vijayapura, Tikota, Athani, Kagwad, Chikkodi (NH160), Sankeshwar (NH48)	Maharastra, Karnataka	572.92	356.00
NH 48	548C	NH48 near Satara, Koregaon, Mhaswad, Malshiras, Akluj, Tembhurni, Kurudwadi, Barshi, Yermala, Kalamb, Kaij, Dharur, Majalgaon, Partur, Watur, Mantha, Lonar, Mehkar, Janephal, Khamgaon, Shegaon, Akot, Anjangaon, Wadgaon, NH47 near Baitul; Mantha, Lonar, Mehkar, Chikhali, NH53 near Khamgaon	Maharashtra	436.5	271.2
NH 48	548CC	NH-548C near Mehkar connecting Chikhali and terminating at its junction with NH-53 near Khamgaon	Maharashtra	101.4	63.0
NH 48	548D	NH48 near Talegaon Dabhade, Chakan, Shikrapur, Nhavare, Srigonda, Jalgaon, Jamkhed, Patoda, Manjarsumba, Kaij, Ambajogai, Ghatnadur, Kingaon, NH361 near Chakur	Maharashtra	392.0	243.6
NH 48	548DD	NH48 near Vadgaon, Katraj, Kondwa, Undri, (Mantarwadi Chowk), Vadki, Loni-Kalbhor, Theurphata, Kesanand, NH753F near Lonikand		16.4	10.2
NH 48	548E	NH548C near Mhasvad, Piliv, NH965 near Pandharpur	Maharashtra	53.5	33.2
NH 48	548H	NH48 near Sankeshwar, Gadhinglaj, Ajara, Amboli, Madkhol, Sawantwadi, Insuli, NH66 near Banda		109.8	68.2
NH 48	648	(NH207) NH48 near Nelamangla, Dodaballapur, Devenhalli (NH44), Sarajpur, Bagalur, NH48 near Hosur	Karnataka, Tamil Nadu	143	89
NH 48	748	(NH4A) NH48 near Belgaum, Anmod, Ponda, NH66 near Panaji	Karnataka, Goa	160	99
NH 48	748AA	NH748 near Machhe, Piranvadi, Navage, Kinaye, Kusamalli, Jamboti, Kalmani, Kankumbi, Poriem, Matnee, Sanquelim		75.7	47.0
NH 48	848	NH48 near Thane, Nashik, Peint, Kaprada, NH48 near Pardi	Maharashtra	309.0	192.0
NH 48	848A	NH48 near Zaroli, Dadra border, Pipriya (Piparia), Silvassa, Ultanfalia, Bhurkudfalia, Khadol, Surangi, VelugamDadra, Sutrakar, NH48 near Talasari			
NH 48	848B	NH48 near Karembali Phatak, Bamanpunja, Dholar Road- Daman & Diu			
NH 48	948	(NH209) NH48 near Bengaluru, Kanakapura, Malvalli, Kollagal, Chamarajnagar, Hasanur, Thimbam, Bannari, Sathyamangalam, Punjai Puliampatti, Annur, NH544 near Coimbatore	Karnataka, Tamil Nadu	317	197
NH 48	948A	NH 648 & NH-48 near Dobaspete (Manne), Nijagal, Kengal, Gudemaranahalli, Harthi, Melahalli, Hulikeregunnur, Rayasandra, Banavasi, Thokasandra in the state of Karnataka connecting Achettipalli, Alur in the state of Tamil Nadu and terminating at its junction with NH-648 near Sarjapur			
NH 49		NH130 near Bilaspur, Janjgir, champa, Raigarh, Kanaktora, Jharsuguda, Kuchinda, Pravasuni, (NH6) Deogarh, Barakot, Palalaharba, KenduJhargarh, Bangriposhi, Baharagora, NH16 near Kharagpur	Chhattishgarh, Odisha, Jharkhand, West Bengal	729	453
NH 49	149	NH49 near Deogarh, Gohira, Palsama, Rengali Dam, Bajrakote, Kaniha, Godibandha, Talcher, NH55 near Banarpal	Odisha	129	80
NH 49	149A	NH49 near Raigarh, Sarangarh, NH53 near Sohela	Chhattisgarh, Odisha	108	67
NH 49	149B	NH49 near Champa, Korba, Chhuri, NH130 near Katghora	Chhattisgarh	74	46
NH 49	149C	NH49 near Kuchinda, Kesaibahal, Bamra, Gadiajore, Sundergarh	Odisha	82.2	51.1
NH 49	149D	NH49 near Raigarh, Kirodimalnagar, Bhupdeopur, Kharsia, Chandrase, Hati	Chhattisgarh	70	43
NH 49	249	NH49 near Raigarh, Beleimunda, Suruguda, NH126 near Sundergarh, Subdega, Pharsabahar, NH43 near Kunkuri	Chhattisgarh, Odisha	188	117
NH 49	249A	NH49 near Raigarh, Dharamjaigarh	Chhattisgarh	77	48
NH 49	249B	Old NH200 (NH49) near Belpahar, Knika	Chhattisgarh	43	27
NH 49	349	NH49 near Kuchinda, Kusumi, Bonaigarh, Nuanidhi, Banspal, NH53 near Suakati	Odisha	154	96
NH 49	349A	NH49 near Kolabira, Sambalpur, Mundoghat, Godabhaga, NH126A near Bisalpalli	Odisha	123	76
NH 49	549	NH-49 near Bangriposi in the state of Odisha connecting Bhanjpur, Baripada, Gopiballavpur, Chichra, Chilkigarh and terminating at its junction with NH-714 near Jhargram in the state of West Bengal	Odisha, West Bengal	128	80
NH 50		Nanded, (NH218) Bidar, NH65 near Homanabad, Gulbarga, Jevargi, (NH13) Bijapur, Hospet, NH48 near Lakshraisagara	Karnataka	721	448
NH 50	150	NH50 near Gulbarga, Yadagiri, NH167 near Devasuguru	Karnataka	137	85
NH 50	150A	NH50 near Jewargi, Siruguppa, Bellary, Challakere, Hiriyur, Chikkanayakanahalli, Nagamangala, Srirangapatna, Mysore, Nanjangud, NH-948 near Chamarajnagar	Karnataka	618	384
NH 50	150B	NH-50 near Kalaburagi (Gulbarga), Dastapur, Murud, Ambajogai, Parli Vaijnath	Karnataka, Maharashtra	274	170
NH 50	150C	NH150A near Lingsugur, Kushtagi, Gadag, Laxmeshwar, Yalavigi, NH48 Shiggaon, Shiggaon	Karnataka	235	146
NH 50	150D	NH150A near Sindhanur, Manvi, Kallur, Raichur, Gadwal, Beechupalli	Karnataka, Telangana	160	99
NH 50	150E	NH-50 near Gulbarga, Chowdapur, Afzalpur, Akkalkot, Solapur, Vairag, NH-465 near Barshi	Karnataka, Maharashtra	206	128
NH 50	150G	NH50 near Mariyammanahalli, Hagari, Bommanahalli, Ittigi, NH74 near Harapanahalli	Karnataka	70	43
NH 51		(NH8E) Dwarka, Bhogat, Porbandar, Navibander, Shil, Mangrol, Somnath, Kodinar, Una, Mahuva, Talaja, Bhavnagar, Songadh, Gadhada, Botad, Ranpur, Limbdi, Surendranagar, Dhrangadhra, Kuda	Gujarat	790	490
NH 51	151	(NH8D) NH51 near Gadu, Vanthali Junagadh, NH27 near Jetpur	Gujarat	99	62
NH 51	151A	NH51 near Dwarka, Khambaliya, Jamnagar, Dhrol, Amran, NH27 near Maliya	Gujarat	268	167
NH 51	251	NH51 near Una, Ghoghla, NH51 near Kesaria			
NH 51	351	NH51 near Mahuva, Saverkundla, Amreli, Bagasara, NH27 near Jetpur			
NH 51	351F	junction with NH-351 near Amreli connecting ishvariya, Varasda, Pipariya, Toda, Lathy, Mahavirnagar, Chavand and terminating at its junction with NH-51 near Dhasa Chowk in the state of Gujarat			
NH 51	751	NH-51 (Nari Junction) near Bhavnagar connecting Bhavaliyari and terminating at the end of Dholera Industrial Zone in the state of Gujarat	Gujarat	59	37
NH 51	751D	NH751 near Vataman Chowk, Fatepura, Valandapura, Indranaj, Tarapur, Lakulesh Nagar, NH64 near Dharmaj			
NH 51	751DD	The highway starting from its junction with new NH-751D near Tarapur connecting Sojitra, Piplav, Sunav and terminating near Bandhani Chowk in the state of Gujarat			
NH 52		Ludhiana, (NH71) Sangrur, (NH65) Narwana, Hisar, (NH11) Fatehpur, (NH12) Jaipur, Tonk, Kota, Aklera, Rajgarh, (NH3) Biora, Shajapur, Maksi, Dewas, Indore, Sendhwa, (NH211) Dhule, Aurangabad, Beed, Osmanabad, (NH13) Solapur, (NH218) Bijapur, (NH63) Hubballi, Ankola	Punjab, Haryana, Rajasthan, Madhya Pradesh, Maharashtra, Karnataka	2,401	1,492
NH 52	152	(NH65) NH52 near Narwana, Kaithal, (NH22) Ambala, NH7 near Panchkula	Haryana	155	96
NH 52	152A	NH52 near Khanauri, Shergarh, Amo, Sangatpura, Nand, Sighwala, Sanghan, Mahal Kheri, Padala, Gandhi, NH52 near Kaithal	Rajasthan	169	105
NH 52	152B	NH52 near Siwani, Loharu, Mahendragarh, Rewari	Rajasthan, Haryana	164	102
NH 52	152C	NH52 near Sadulpur, Mandrella, Jhunjhunu, Nawalgarh, NH311 near Sikar	Rajasthan	127	79
NH 52	152D	Junction with NH-152 near Gangheri (near Ismailabad), Kaul Dhatrath, Lakhan Majra, Kalanaur, Charkhi Dadri and terminating at its junction with NH-148B (Narnaul bypass) in the state of Haryana	Rajasthan, Haryana	144	89
NH 52	152G	NH52 near Saounta, Shahabad (Haryana), Sadhaura, NH7 near Kala Amb	Haryana, Himachal Pradesh	79	49
NH 52	352	(NH71) NH52 near Narwana, Jind, Rohtak, Jhajjar, Rewari, NH48 near Bawal	Haryana	218	135
NH 52	352A	NH352 near Jind, Gohana, NH334B near Sonipat	Haryana	183.9	114.3
NH 52	352R	NH352 (Jhajjar Bypass), Dulhera, Daboda Khurd, Nuna Majra, NH9 (Bahadurgarh Bypass)		25.4	15.8
NH 52	352W	NH352 near Vijay Nagar (Rewari), Kakoria, Jaitpur, Pataudi, Jamalpur, Wazirpur, Harsaru, NH48 near Shaktinagar (Gurugram)		45.8	28.5
NH 52	552	(NH116) NH52 near Tonk, Uniara, Sawai Madhopur, Sheopur, Goras, Shampur, Sabalgarh, Morena, Porsa, Ater, Bhind, Mihona, Bhander, NH-27 near Chirgaon	Rajasthan, Madhya Pradesh, Uttar Pradesh	486	302
NH 52	552A	NH552 near Sawai Madhopur, Indergarh, Lakheri, Bundi, Abhaypura, NH27 near Bijoliya	Rajasthan	170	110
NH 52	552B	NH52 near Kota, Keshorai Patan, Lakheri, Indergarh, Sawai Madhopur, Lalsot, NH48 near Dausa	Rajasthan	237	147
NH 52	552C	NH52 near Baroni, Shiwar, Sawai Madhopur, Sapotara NH23 near Kurgaon	Rajasthan	148	92
NH 52	552D	NH552 near Sheopur, Itawa, Baran, Chhabra Gugor, NH46 near Ruthiyai	Rajasthan, Madhya Pradesh	218	135
NH 52	552G	NH52 near Jhalarapatan, Beenda, Dawal, Dongargaon, Soyat, Susner, Agar, Ghosla, Ghatia, Ujjain	Rajasthan, Madhya Pradesh	165.4	102.8
NH 52	652	NH52 near Tuljapur, Andur, Naldurg, Hannur, NH150 near Akkalkot		71.8	44.6
NH 52	752	(NH90) Aklera, Atru, Baran	Rajasthan	92	57
NH 52	752B	RJ/MP Border, Susner, Khilchipur, Biaora, Maksundangarh, Sironj	Rajasthan	192.2	119.4
NH 52	752C	NH752B near Jirapur, (Pacher) Pachor, Shujalpur, NH86 near Ashta	Rajasthan	138.2	85.9
NH 52	752E	NH752F near Paithan, Mungi, Bodhegaon, Ghogaspargaon, Ukhanda Chakla, Midsangvi, Shirur Kasar, Kholyachiwadi, Kharegaon, Dongarkinhi, Chumbli, Patoda, Pargaon Ghumra, Dighol, Khardaha	Maharashtra		
NH 52	752G	NH53 near Sendwa, Khetia, Shahada, Prakasha, Nandurbar, Visarwadi, Sakri, Satana, Deola, Chandvad, Manmad, Yeola, Kopargaon, NH160 near Shirdi	Maharashtra	358.8	222.9
NH 52	752H	NH752G near Yevla, Andarsul, Rotegaon, Shivur, Devgaon, Ranagari, Dewashi, Daultabad, Khultabad, Phulambri Dabhadi, Rajur, NH753A near Deulgaon	Maharashtra	200.8	124.8
NH 52	752I	NH752G near Kopargaon, Vaijapur, Lasur, Aurangabad, Jalana Watur, Mantha, Jintur, Aunda Nagnath, Basmat, Ardhapur, Tamsa, Himayatnagar, Dhanki Phulsawangi, Mahur, NH361 near Dhanoda	Maharashtra	459.6	285.6
NH 52	752K	NH752I near Jintur, Bori, Zari, Parbhani, Gangakhed, Isad, Kingaon, Dhanora, Wadval, Nagnath, Gharani, Nalegoan, Latur, Nitur, Nilanga, Sirshi, Aurad Shajani, NH50 near Bhalki	Maharashtra	241.4	150.0
NH 53		(NH6 old numbering) Hajira, Surat, Uchchhal, Dhule, Jalgaon, Nashirabad, Bhusawal, Akola, Amravati, Nagpur, Bhandara, Deori, Rajnandgaon, Durg, Raipur, Arang, Saraipali, Bargarh, Sambalpur, (NH200) Deogarh, Pallahara, Samal, Godibandha, Talcher, Dubri, Chandhikhol, (NH5A) Haridaspur, Paradip Port	Gujarat, Maharashtra, Chhattisgarh, Odisha	1,849	1,149
NH 53	153	(NH216) NH53 near Saraipali, Sarangarh, NH49 near Raigarh, NH130A near Dharamjaigarh	Chhattisgarh	163	101
NH 53	153A	NH53 near Bargarh, NH57 near Raigarh	Odisha, Chhattisgarh	88	55
NH 53	153B	NH53 near Deogarh, Reamal, Naktideul, Redhakhol, NH57 near Baudhgarh	Odisha	112	70
NH 53	353	(NH217) NH53 near Ghorai, Mahasamund, Bagbahra, Nauparha, NH59 near Khariar, Bhawanipatna	Chhattisgarh, Odisha	222	138
NH 53	353B	NH44 near Adilabad, Korpana, Vansadi, Gadchandur, Bamawada, Rajura, Gondpimpri, NH353C near Ashti	Maharashtra, Telangana	141	88
NH 53	353C	NH53 near Sakoli, Warda, Armori, Gadchiroli, Chamorsi, Ashti, Allapalli, Repanpalli, Sironcha	Maharashtra, Telangana	424	263
NH 53	353D	NH53 near Nagpur, Umred, Nagbhir, Brahmapuri, NH353C near Armori	Maharashtra	137	85
NH 53	353E	NH353D near Umred, Bhisi Chimur, Anandvan, Waroda	Maharashtra	90	56
NH 53	353I	NH53 near Wadi, Hingana, Tpoint, Essasani, Mihan, Outer Ring road, Gumgaon, Gumgaon, Salaidhabha, Butibori MIDC, Takalghat, Kapri Moreshwar, Asola, Dry Port at Sindi Railway, NH361 near Pavnar	Maharashtra	73	45
NH 53	353J	NH53 near Nagpur, Kalmeshwar, Katol, Bharsingi, Jalaikheda, Warud, Chandur Bazar, Achalpur, NH548C near Paratwada	Maharashtra	172	107
NH 53	353K	NH53 near Nandgaon Peth, Shirkhed, Morshi, NH347A near Warud	Maharashtra	95.7	59.5
NH 53	553	NH53 near Rajnandgaon, Rajnandgaon Station, Chikhali, Gaurinagar, Dharamapur, Bagtarai, Sukuldaihan, Musra, Belgaon, Dongargarh, Paniyajab, Bortalao, Darekasa, Hazara Hills, Salekasa, NH543 near Amgaon	Chhattisgarh, Maharashtra	89.2	55.4
NH 53	553A	NH53 near Tumdiboda, Mata Bamleshwari Temple, Dongargarh Station, Dongargarh Thana Chowk, Makkatola, NH53 near Chichola	Chhattisgarh, Maharashtra	38.6	24.0
NH 53	553B	NH553 near Dongargarh, Dhara, NH53 near Khairagarh	Chhattisgarh	37.5	23.3
NH 53	753	NH353C near Wadsa, Goregaon, Gondia, Tirora, Tumsar, Usara, Jamb, Shiv, Ramtek, Parsheoni, Khapa, NH47 near Savner	Maharashtra	267	166
NH 53	753A	NH53 near Malkapur, Buldhana, Chikhli, Deulgaon Raja, Jalna, NH52 near Aurangabad	Maharashtra	205	127
NH 53	753AB	NH53 near Muktainagar, Ghorasgaon, Kurha, Asalgaon, Jalgaon-Jamod, Tunki, Hiwarkhed, Akot, Melghat Tiger Reserve, Harisal	Maharashtra	256	159
NH 53	753B	NH53 near Sankari, Nizampur, Chhadvel, Nandurbar, Taloda, Akkalkura, Dediapada, NH953 near Netrang, Jhagadia, NH 48 near Ankleshwar	Maharashtra, Gujarat	240	150
NH 53	753BB	Dharangaon, Amalner, Nardana, Sindkheda, Dondaicha, Nandurbar	Maharashtra	133	83
NH 53	753BC	NH53 at Malkapur, Bodwad, Kurshe-Nasirabad, Jalgaon, Dharangaon, Chopada, Geruaghati, Balwadi, NH52 near Sendhwa	Maharashtra, Madhya Pradesh	217	135
NH 53	753BD	NH753BC at Dharangaon, Erandol, Neri, NH753L near Jamner	Maharashtra	70	43
NH 53	753BE	NH53 at Bhusaval, Banmod, Faizpur, Chopada, Shirpur, NH160H near Sahada	Maharashtra	185	115
NH 53	753BG	NH753BE near Yawal, NH53 near Bhusaval, Jamner	Maharashtra	47.2	29.3
NH 53	753C	NH753A (Jalna Bypass), Sindhkhed Raja, Dusrabid, Bibi, Sultanpur, Mehkar, Dongaon, kenwad, Malegaon Jahangir, Shelu bazar, Karanja, Bramhankhed, Kherda, Pimpalgaon, Vaghoda, Dashasar, Talegaon, NH347A near Pulgaon	Maharashtra	225.1	139.9
NH 53	753E	NH753F near Ajanta, Buldhana, NH53 near Khamgaon	Maharashtra	100.8	62.6
NH 53	753F	NH53 near Jalgaon, Pahur, Ajanta, Sillod, Phulambri, Aurangabad, Newasa, Wadala Bahiroba, Ghodegaon, Ahmednagar, Shirur, Ranjangaon, Shikrapur, Pune, Paud, Mulshi, Tamhini, Nijampur, Mangaon, Mhasla, NH166C at Dighi Port	Maharashtra	538.8	334.8
NH 53	753H	NH753F near Sillod, Bhokardan, Hasnabad, Rajur, Bawnepangri, Jalna, Ambad, NH52 near Wadigodri (Warigodri)	Maharashtra	116.6	72.5
NH 53	753J	NH53 Jalgaon, Mehrun, Shiroli, Samner, Lasgaon, Pachora, Bhadgaon, Chalisgaon, Tambora, Nyaydongri, Pimperkhed, Nandgaon, Hisvahal, NH752G near Manmad	Maharashtra	235	146
NH 53	753L	NH753F near Pahur, Jamner, Bodvad, Muktainagar, Burhanpur, NH347B near Khandwa	Maharashtra, Madhya Pradesh	166.3	103.3
NH 53	753M	NH753A near Chikhali, Dhad, Mahora, Bhokardan, Hasanbad, NH752H	Maharashtra	111.7	69.4
NH 53	953	NH53 near Songudh, Ahwa, Savad, NH60 near Pimpalgaon Baswant	Maharashtra, Gujarat	198	123
NH 54		(NH15) Pathankot, Gurdaspur, Amritsar, Zira, Faridkot, (NH64) Bathinda, Hanumangarh, Pilibanga, Rawatsar, Nohar, Taranagar, Churu, Ratangarh, Salasar, Renal, Asalpur, Jobner, near NH48 Jaipur	Punjab, Rajasthan	916	569
NH 54	154	(NH20) NH54 near Pathankot, Nurpur, Palampur, Jogindarnagar, (NH21) Mandi, Sundar Nagar, Ghaghas, Bilaspur, NH205 near Nauni	Punjab, Himachal Pradesh	279	173
NH 54	154A	NH154 near Pathankot, Banikhet, Chamba, Bharmour	Punjab, Himachal Pradesh	167	104
NH 54	254	NH54 near Mundki, Baghapurana, Salabatpura, Rampura, Maur, Takth Sri Damdama Sahib, NH54 near New Dabwali	Punjab, Haryana	155	96
NH 54	354	NH54 near Gurdaspur, Derababa Nanak, Ramdas, Ajnala, Amritsar, Chabal Kalan, Bhikhiwind, Amarkot, Khem Kara (Indo-Pak Border), Arifke, Firozpur, Sadiq, Muktsar (NH-754), Rupana, NH7 near Malout	Punjab	244.5	151.9
NH 54	354B	NH-354 near Dera Baba Nanak and terminating at Indo-Pak border	Punjab	4.61	2.86
NH 54	354E	NH 54 near Dabwali, Sito Gunno, Abhohar on NH62	Punjab	50.89	31.62
NH 54	754	NH54 near Bhatinda, Muktsar, Saidoke, Jalalabad	Punjab	70	43
NH 54	754K	The highway starting from its junction with new NH-54 near Mandi Dabawali connecting Hanumangarh, Suratgarh, Loonkarasar, Bikaner, Jodhpur, Thob, Pachpadra, Balotra, Sanchore in the state of Rajasthan, Tharad, Vav and terminating at its junction with NH-27 near Santalpur	Punjab, Rajasthan, Gujarat	848	527
NH 54	954	NH54 near Kenchiya, Pakka Saharaha, Morjanda Khari, Mamakhera, Lalgarh Jattan, Banwala, Sriganganagar, Kesrisinghpur, Srikaranpur, NH911 near Gajasinghpur	Rajasthan	152	94
NH 55		(NH42) NH53 near Sambalpur, Redhakhol, Angul, Nuahata, Dhenkanal, NH16 near Cuttack, Paradeep	Odisha	361	224
NH 55	155	NH55 near Boinda, Athmalik, Dhaurakhaman, NH57 near Sonepur	Odisha	134	83
NH 55	355	NH55 near Badakera, Mahidharpur, Narsinghapur, Sidhamula, NH57 near Khordha	Odisha	127.50	79.22
NH 55	555	NH55 near Sambalpur, Sonepur, Mohangiri, NH59 near Baliguda		192	119
NH 55	655	NH55 near Angul (Angul stadium), Mahidharpur, Satmile, Rasol, Bhapur, Athagarh, Gopinathapur, Totapada, NH55 near Dhenkanal		90	56
NH 56		NH156 near Nimbahera, Pratapgarh, Banswara, Jhalod, Umbi, NH47 near Dahod, ALirajpur, Chhota Udepur, Bodeli, Kevadiya (Ektanagar), Netrang, Vapi	Rajasthan, Madhya Pradesh, Gujarat	703	437
NH 56	156	Chittaurgarh, Mandsaur, Ratlam, Lebad, Manpur (M.P.)	Rajasthan, Madhya Pradesh	337	209
NH 56	256	The highway starting from NH-56 near Pratapgarh connecting Mandsaur, Chaumahala, Dag and terminating at NH552G near Susner	Rajasthan, Madhya Pradesh	178	111
NH 56	356	The highway starting from NH-56 near Jhalod connecting Santrampur, Lunavada, Bayad, Dahegram & ending at NH-48 near Chiloda	Gujarat	178	111
NH 56	556	The highway starting from NH-56 near Chhota Itara connecting Jobat, Bagh Caves at Bagh, Barwani and terminating at NH52 near Sendhwa	Madhya Pradesh	164	102
NH 56	756	The highway starting from its junction with NH-56 near Bodeli connecting Jambugodha, Pavagarh, Chmapaner, Halol and terminating at NH47 near Timba	Gujarat	100	62
NH 57		(NH224) NH26 near Balangir, Sonapur, Bauda, Dashapalla, Nayagarh, NH16 near Khordha	Odisha, Puri	352	219
NH 57	157	NH57 near Purunakatak, Phulbani, Kalinga, Bhanjanagar, NH59 near Asika		156.1	97.0
NH 57	157A	NH157 near Phulbani, Jamujhari, Dutimendi, Khajuripada, NH57 near Madhapur		36.0	22.4
NH 58		(NH65) NH52 near Fatehpur, Ladnun, (NH89) Nagaur, Merta City, (NH8) Ajmer, Beawar, Bhim, Deogarh Madariya, Rajsamand, (NH76A) Udaipur, Jharol, Vijaynagar, Vireshwar, Vadali, Satlasana, Jalotra, NH27 near Palanpur	Rajasthan, Gujarat	886	551
NH 58	58EXT	(NH76A) NH58 near Ratanpur, Motasada, Shri Mata Ambaji Dham, Khed Brahma NH48 near Himmatnagar	Gujarat	126	78
NH 58	158	(NH65A) NH58 near Lambia, Ras, Bawra, Beawar, Badnor, Asind, NH48 near Bhilwara	Rajasthan	163	101
NH 58	258	(NH65A) NH58EXT near Shri Mata Ambaji Dham, Chitrasani, Deesa, lakhani, Tharad, Kareli (Luni River end point)	Gujarat	177	110
NH 58	358	(NH65A) NH58 near Nagaur, Taranau, Khatu, Makrana, Parvatsar, NH58 near Bherunda-Dodiyana	Rajasthan	190	120
NH 58	358A	(NH65A) NH58 near Nagaur, Champasar, NH11 near Phalodi	Rajasthan	155	96
NH 58	458	(NH65A) NH58 near Ladnun, Didwana, Khaatu, Degana, Merta City, Lambia, Jaitaran, Bar, Raipur, NH58 near Bheem	Rajasthan	300	190
NH 58	558	Following Old MG Railway Line from (NH65A) NH158 near Bhilwara, Shahpura-Khekri, Malpura, Diggi, Phagi, Renwal Manji, NH48 near Sanganer	Rajasthan	211	131
NH 58	758	(NH76B) NH58 near RajSamund, Bhilwara, NH27 near Mandalgarh	Rajasthan	152	94
NH 59		(NH217) NH353 near Khariar, Titlagrah, Lankagarh, Baligurha, Surada, Asika, NH16 near Brahmapur	Odisha	352	219
NH 59	159	NH59 near Madanpur Rampur, Santpur, Bishama Katek, Rayagada, Parvathipuram, Bobbili, NH26 near Ramabhadrapuram	Odisha, Andhra Pradesh	243	151
NH 59	359	NH59 near Bangomunda, Kantabanji, Patnagarh, Balangir	Odisha	100	62
NH 59	559	NH59 near Tumulibandh, NH159 near Muniguda	Odisha	60	37
NH 59	759	NH59 near Surada, Badagada, Digapahandi, Chikiti, NH16 near Ichhapuram	Odisha, Andhra Pradesh	101	63
NH 60		(NH3) NH53 near Dhule, (NH50) Nashik, Sinnar, Sangammer, Alephata, NH48 near Pune	Maharashtra	414	257
NH 60	160	NH60 near Nashik, Igatpuri, Kasara, Shirol, Bhiwandi, NH48 near Thane	Maharashtra	158	98
NH 60	160A	NH60 near Sinnar, Pandhurli, Dhamangaon, NH160 near Khambale, Trimbakeshwar, Mokhada, Jawhar, Vikramgad, Manor near NH-48, Palghar	Maharashtra	222	138
NH 60	160B	NH60 near Sinnar, Kopargaon, Rahuri, Ahilyanagar (Ahmednagar), Srigonda, Kashti, Daund, Kurkumbh, Baramati, Phaltan, Mayani, Tasgaon, Sangli, Miraj, Chikodi, NH48 near Sankeswar	Maharashtra	511	318 (2nd instance of subsidiary highway longer than main highway)
NH 60	160C	NH160 near Rahuri, NH753F near Shani Shinganapur, Kukana, Shevgaon, NH752E near Paithan	Maharashtra	103	64
NH 60	160D	NH60 near Nandur-Shingote, Talegaon-Dighe, Loni, NH160 near Kolhar	Maharashtra	49	30
NH 60	160E	NH160D near Loni, Shrirampur, Taklibhan, Newasa Phata	Maharashtra	60	37
NH 60	160G	NH160 near Kopargaon, Puntamba, Shrirampur, Belapur, NH160 near Rahuri Factory	Maharashtra	66	41
NH 60	160H	NH60 near Malegaon, Chaugaon, Kusumbe, Mehargaon, Khwathi, Lamkhani, Shewade, Dondaicha, Sarangkheda, Sawalde, NH752G near Shahada	Maharashtra	130	81
NH 60	260	NH60 near Chandwad, Lasalgaon, Kopargaon, Talegaon Dighe, NH60 near Sangamner	Maharashtra	124	77
NH 60	360	NH160 near Dhamori, Pandhricha, Shevgaon, Bodhegaon, NH52 near Georai	Maharashtra	122	76
NH 60	560	NH60 near Pune, Bopdev, Saswad, Veer, Wathar Budruk	Maharashtra	63	39
NH 61		NH160 near Bhiwandi, Kalyan, Murbad, Moroshi, Malshej, Otur, Alephata, Sawargaon, Bhalawani, Ahilyanagar, Karanji, Tisgaon, Pathardi, Talewadi-Shivajinagar, Majalgaon, Parbhani, Purna, Hazur Sahib Nanded, Basmat, Bhokar, Bhainsa, Nirmal, NH63 near Metapally	Maharashtra, Telangana	720	450
NH 61	161	(NH65) NH65 near Sangareddy, Nanded (NH61), Hingoli, Washim, NH53 near Akola	Maharashtra	429.8	267.1
NH 61	161A	(NH548C) NH548C near Akot, Patsul, Akola, Barshi Takli, Shelu bazaar, Mangrulpir, Manora, Digras, Arni, Dhanoda (overlap), Mahur, Sarkhani, Kinvat, Islapur, Himayatnagar, Bhokar, Mudkhed (overlap), Nanded, Osmanpur, Kautha, Mukhed, Barhali, Mukrabad, Lakhmapur, Sawarmal, Nangarga, vazzar, Aurad, Tuljapur, Mustapur, Markhal, Nawadgeri - junction with Bidar Ring Road	Maharashtra, Karnataka	482.3	299.7
NH 61	161AA	NH161 near Sangareddy, Narsapur, Tooprtan, Gajwel, Pragnapur, Jagdevpur, Bhuvanagiri-junction with NH163 near Choutuppal	Telangana	123.4	76.7
NH 61	161B	NH161 near Nizampet, Moodguntal, Narayanakhed, Manoor, Bellapur, Pulkurthi, Pipri, Ibrahimpur, Nyalkal, Athnoor, Dappur, Telangana/Karnataka border	Telangana	122.1	75.9
NH 61	161BB	NH161 near Madnoor, Sonala, Thadi Hipperga, Limboor, Sirpur, Pothangal, Kotagiri, Rudrur, NH63 near Bodhan	Telangana	89.2	55.4
NH 61	161E	NH161 near Washim, Bhoyar, Shelgaon, Mangrulpir, Poghat, Karanja, Kamargaon, NH53 near Hivra Bk	Maharashtra	105	65
NH 61	161G	NH347C near Burhanpur, Jalgaoon-Jamod, Shehgaon, Patur	Madhya Pradesh, Maharashtra	157	98
NH 61	161H	NH161G near Jalgaon Jamod, Nandura, Motala, Fattepur, Jamner, Bhusaval	Maharashtra	159	99
NH 61	261	NH161 near Digras, Pusad, Kalamnuri	Maharashtra	85	53
NH 61	261A	NH161 near Washim, Pusad, Khadaka, Mahagaon, Gunj	Maharashtra	114	71
NH 61	261B	NH361C near Darwaha, Arni, Akolabazar, Ghatanji, NH44 near Kelapur	Maharashtra	114	71
NH 61	361	(NH52) NH52 near Tuljapur, Ausa, Latur, Ahmedpur, NH161 near Nanded, Hadgaon, Umerkhed, Yavatmal, Wardha, (NH44) NH44 near Patan Bori	Maharashtra	548	341
NH 61	361B	(NH361) NH361 near Kalamb road, Ralegaon, Kapsi, Sirasgaon, Vadner, NH44 near Wadki	Maharashtra	50.5	31.4
NH 61	361C	(NH361) NH361 near Digras, Donad, Darwha, Karanja, Mozor, NH53 near Murtijapur	Maharashtra	101.2	62.9
NH 61	361F	NH361 near Loha, Palam, Gangakhed, Parli Vaijnath, Telgaon, Wadvani, Beed, Arvi, Kharwandi		209.0	129.9
NH 61	361H	(NH752F) NH752F near Parali Vaijnath, Dharmapuri, Pangaon, Renapur Phata	Maharashtra	60	37
NH 61	461B	NH161 near Hingoli, Namdeo, Narsi, Sengaon, Sakhara, Risod, NH753C near Malegaon	Maharashtra	105.4	65.5
NH 61	561	(NH61) NH61 near Ahmednagar, Ashti, Chichondi Patil, Kada, Rajuri, Jamkhed, Otherla, Pitthi, Shirapur, NH52 near Beed	Maharashtra	141.9	88.2
NH 61	561A	(NH61) NH61 near Ahmednagar, Karmala, Tembhurni, Parite, Karkamb, Pandharpur, Mangalwedha, NH52 near Vijapur	Maharashtra	289.5	179.9
NH 61	561B	NH61 near Kalyan Nagar, Junnar, Narayangaon, Belhe, Kanhoor, Shirur	Maharashtra	118	73
NH 61	761	NH61 near Belhe, Alkuti, Devibhoyare, Nighoj, NH753F near Shirur	Maharashtra	49.0	30.4
NH 61	961	NH61 near Murbad, Abernath, Pavala, Navi Mumbai, Uran, Trans-Harbour Link, Mumbai	Maharashtra	105	65
NH 62		(NH15) Abohar, Ganganagar, Suratgarh, Lunkaransar, (NH89) Bikaner, (NH65) Nagaur, Jodhpur, (NH14) Pali, Sirohi, Pindwara	Punjab, Rajasthan	784	487
NH 62	162	(NH14) Bar, Pali, Marwad, Nadol, Desuri, Kumbalgarh, Haldighati, Nathdwara, Mavli, Bhatevar	Rajasthan	273	170
NH 62	162EXT	NH62 near Pali, Marwad, Nadol, Desuri, Kumbalgarh, Haldighati, Nathdwara, Mavli, Bhatevar	Rajasthan	184	114
NH 62	162A	NH48 connector Udaipur, NH162 near Mavli, Fatehnagar, Dariba, Railmagra, NH758 near Khandel	Rajasthan	86	53
NH 62	262	NH62 connector Jodhpur, Roopawas, Bhaisana, Sojat Road	Rajasthan	101	63
NH 62	262A	NH62 connector Jodhpur, Sardar Samand, Jadan, Marwar	Rajasthan	91	57
NH 62	362	NH162A near Fatehnagar, Chittaurgarh, Mandalgarh, NH148D near Jahazpur	Rajasthan	212	132
NH 62	562	NH62 near Sanderao, Falna, Sadri, Desuri, Jojawar, Khamblighat, Deogarh Madariya, Sanvariya, NH758 near Khandel	Rajasthan	201	125
NH 62	762	NH162 connector Somesar, Jojawar, Siriyari, Sojat, Bilara, NH25 near Bilara	Rajasthan	129	80
NH 63		NH160 near Daund, Karmala, Barshi, Yedshi, Dhoki, Murud, Latur, Renapur, Nalegaon, Dighoi, Udgir, Deglur, Adampur, Khatgoan, Sagroli, Bodhan, Nizamabad, Metpalli, Jagtial, Mancherial, Chennur, Sironcha, Bhopalpatnam, Bijapur, Geedam, Jagdalpur, Jeypore, Kotpad, Borigumma, NH26-NH326 junction near Koraput	Maharashtra, Chhattisgarh, Odisha, Telangana	1,065	662
NH 63	163	(NH202) NH63 near Bhopalpatnam, Venkatapuram, Eturunagaram, Warangal, Jangaon, Bhuvanagiri, Chadherghat, Mahatma Gandhi Bus station, Hyderabad City	Chhattisgarh, Telangana	447.1	277.8
NH 63	163A	Geedam (Gidam) on NH-63 and terminating at Dantewara	Chhattisgarh, Telangana	12.6	7.8
NH 63	163B	Hyderabad-Secunderabad City Ring Road connecting NH44, NH65 & NH163	Telangana	162	101
NH 63	163C	NH44 near Bongloor, Devarakonda, Nalgonda, NH167 near Miryalaguda	Telangana	178	111
NH 63	263	NH163 near Eturnagaram, Sompalli, Kukunoor, NH365BB near Aswaraopeta	Telangana, Andhra Pradesh	186	116
NH 63	363	NH563 near Karimnagar, Peddapalli, Ramagundam, Indaram, Mancherial, Bellampalle, Asifabad, Lakkadkot	Telangana, Maharashtra	173	107
NH 63	563	NH63 near Mancherial, Ramagundam, Peddapalli, Karimnagar, Huzurabad, Warangal, Mated, NH365A near Khammam	Chhattisgarh, Telangana	240.8	149.6
NH 63	763	NH163 near Godavaripuram, Venkatapuram, Palemgyi, Cherlazee, Parnasala, Bhadrachalam	Telangana, Andhra Pradesh	115	71
NH 64		(NH8) NH48 near Ahmedabad, (NH228) Anand, Dandi	Gujarat	332	206
NH 64	164	NH64 near Vadodara, Gujjupura, Jambusar, Amod, Chanchvel, Dahej, Lakhigam	Gujarat	130	81
NH 64	264	NH164 near Dahej, Gujjuvad, Dehgam, Bharuch, Jhagadia, Amletha, Rajpipla, Kevadiya (Ektanagar)	Gujarat	145	90
NH 64	364	NH64 near Vadodara, Dabhoi, Devaliya, Kevadiya (Ektanagar)	Gujarat	93	58
NH 64	564	NH164 near Amod, Miyagram-Karjan, Dabhoi, NH56 near Bodeli	Gujarat	106	66
NH 65		(NH9) NH48 near Pune, Indapur, Solapur, Umarga, Homnabad, Zahirabad, Hyderabad, Suryapet, Kodad, Vijayawada, Vuyyuru, Pamarru, NH216 near Machilipatnam	Maharashtra, Karnataka, Telangana, Andhra Pradesh	962	598
NH 65	165	(NH214) NH65 near Pamarru, Mandavalli, Pallevada, Digamarru, NH216 near Narsapur	Andhra Pradesh	107	66
NH 65	265	NH65 near Hyderabad, Siddipet, Near NH563 Karimnagar	Telangana	163	101
NH 65	365	Near NH65 Suryapet, Arvapally, Danthalapally, Maripeda Mahabubabad, Narsampet, near NH163 Mallampalli	Telangana	170	110
NH 65	365A	Near NH65 par Kodad, Khammam, NH365 at Kuravi	Telangana	75	47
NH 65	365B	NH65/NH365 near Suryapet, Jangaon Siddipet, Siricilla	Telangana	267	166
NH 65	365BB	NH65 near Suryapet, Mothey, Khammam, Wyra, Thallada, Mittapalli, Kalluru, Sattupalli, Ashwaraopet, Jeelugumilli, Buttaigudem, Kannapuram, Pattiseema, Tallapudi, NH16 near Kovvur	Andhra Pradesh, Telangana	279.3	173.5
NH 65	365BG	NH-365BB near Thallampadu connecting Madhulapalli, Basvapuram, Siripuram (KG), Chandrupatla, Yerragunta, Thumbur in the state of Telangana, Lingagudem, T.Narasapuram, Borrampalem, Vallampatla, Devulapalli, Rajavaram, Vadalakunta and terminating at its junction with NH-16 near Devarapalle in the state of Andhra Pradesh	Telangana, Andhra Pradesh		
NH 65	465	NH65 near Mohol, Kurul, Mandrup, Basavanagar, Walsang, NH65 near Tandulwadi		106.3	66.1
NH 65	565	NH65 near Nakrekal, Nalgonda, Markapur, NH 71 Near Yerpedu	Andhra Pradesh, Telangana	600	370
NH 65	765	NH65 near Hyderabad, Srisailam, near NH565 Junction	Andhra Pradesh, Telangana	176	109
NH 65	765D	Hyderabad (junction at outer ring road) connecting Narsapur, Rampur, and terminating at Medak	Telangana	54	34
NH 65	965	NH65 near Mohl, Pandharpr, Malshiras, Pjaltan, Nira, Jejuri, Saswad, Pune			
NH 65	965C	NH65 near Mohl, Pandharpr, Malshiras, Pjaltan, Nira, Jejuri, Saswad, Pune			
NH 65	965D	NH65 near Kedagaon, Supe, Morgaon, Nira, Lonand, Wathar, NH48 near Wade Phata (Satara)		96.3	59.8
NH 65	965DD	NH965D near Lonand, Andori, Shirwal, Bhor, Apti, Mahad, Mandangarh, Pacharal (with connection to birthplace of Baba Saheb Ambedkar)		166.3	103.3
NH 65	965G	NH65 near Patas, Baramati, Indapur, Akluj, Velapur, Sangola, Bhalwani, Kadlas, NH166E near Jat			
NH 66		(NH17) NH48 near Panvel, Indapur, Mahad, Rajapur, Kudal, Panaji, Margao, Karwar, Honavar, Udupi, Mangalore, Kasaragod, Kannur, Kozhikode, Ponnani, Guruvayoor, NH544 near Edappalli, (NH47) Ernakulam, Alappuzha, Kollam, Attingal, Thiruvananthapuram, NH44 near Kanyakumari	Maharashtra, Goa, Karnataka, Kerala, Tamil Nadu	1,640	1,020
NH 66	166	(NH204) Ratnagiri, Tink, Pali, NH48 near Kolhapur	Maharashtra	149	93
NH 66	166A	NH66 near Vadkhal, Alibag			
NH 66	166D	NH66 near Pen, Ransai, NH548A near Madh (Mahad Ashtvinayak)		26.4	16.4
NH 66	166E	NH166C near Guhagar, Chiplun, Patan, Karad, Kadegaon, Vita, Khanapur, Nagaj, Jat, NH52 near Vijapur			
NH 66	166F	NH66 near Mahad, Raigad Fort		28.3	17.6
NH 66	166G	NH66 near Talere (Talera), Vaibhavawadi, Gaganbawada (Bavda), NH48 near Kolhapur		87.1	54.1
NH 66	166H	NH166 near Sangli, NH48 near Peth Naka			
NH 66	166S	NH66 near Dhargalim, Mopa Airport near Varconda	Goa		
NH 66	266	NH166E near Jat, Kavathe Mahnkal, Shirdhona, Tasgaon, Palus, NH166E near Karad			
NH 66	366	(NH17A) NH66 near Cortalim, Vasco, Monnugao Port	Goa	10	6.2
NH 66	566	(NH17B) NH748 near Ponda, Verna, NH366 near Vasco	Goa	12.2	7.6
NH 66	666	NH66 near Karwar, Kaliwadi, Mallapur, Yellapur, Mundgod, NH48 near Bankapura	Karnataka	175	109
NH 66	766	(NH212) NH66 near Kozhikode, Kalpetta, Gundlulpet, Mysore, NH948 near Kollegal	Kerala, Karnataka	268	167
NH 66	766C	NH66 near Byndoor, Kollur, Hosanagara, Anandapura, Shikarpur, Masur, NH48 near Rainibennur	Karnataka	198.5	123.3
NH 66	766E	NH-66 near Kumta connecting Devimane, Ammenalli, Kolagibees, Hanumanthi, Sirsi, Yekkambi, Balihalli, Akki Alur, Aladakatti and terminating at its junction with NH-48 (Haveri Bypass)	Karnataka	127.68	79.34
NH 66	766EE	NH-66 near Hattikeri and terminating at Belekeri Port	Karnataka	4.27	2.65
NH 66	966	(NH213) NH66 near Ferokh, NH544 near Palakkad	Kerala	122	76
NH 66	966A	(NH47C) NH544 near Kalamassery, NH66, Vallarpadam, Ernakulam	Kerala	15	9.3
NH 66	966B	(NH47A) NH66, Willington Island near Kochi, Ernakulam	Kerala	8	5.0
NH 67		Ramanagara, (NH63) NH48 near Dharwad, (Exit) NH48 near Hubballi, Gadag, Koppal, Hosepet, Bellary, Gooty, Tadapatri, Muddanuru, NH40 near Mydukur, Badvel, Atmakur, Nellore, Krishnapatnam	Karnataka, Andhra Pradesh	814	506
NH 67	167	NH67 near Ballari, Adoni, Mantralayam, Raichur, Makhtal, Devarkonda, Mahabubnagar, Miryalaguda, NH65 near Kodad	Karnataka, Telangana, Andhra Pradesh	503	313
NH 67	167A	Miryalaguda, Piduguralla, Narsaraopet, Chilakaluripet, Chirala on NH216, Vodarevu in AP	Telangana, Andhra Pradesh	164	102
NH 67	167B	Mydukur, Badvel, Porumamilla, Chandrasekharapuram, Pamuru, Botlagudur, Kandukur, NH16 near Singarayakonda	Andhra Pradesh	230	140
NH 67	167BG	NH 167B at Seetharampuram connecting Udayagiri, Duthuluru and terminating at its junction with NH 16 near Kavali	Andhra Pradesh	106	66
NH 67	267	NH67 at Nellore connecting Somasila via Poddalakkuru	Andhra Pradesh	85	53
NH 67	367	NH67 near Bhanapur, Kukunur, Yelburga, Gajendragad, Badami, Guledagudda, Bagalkot, NH52 near Gadankeri	Karnataka	145	90
NH 67	367A	NH67 near Koppal, NH50 near Metgal, Kanakagiri, Mudgal NH150A near Lingsugur	Karnataka	123	76
NH 67	367B	NH67 near Gadag-Betageri, Laxmeshwar, NH48 near Bankapura	Karnataka	83	52
NH 67	567	NH67 near Hubballi, Dharwad, Bailhongal, Gokak, Ghataprabha, NH48-NH160 Junction at Sankeshwar	Karnataka	167	104
NH 67	767	NH67 near Koppal-Mundargi-Balehosuru-Laxmeswar-Kundgol-NH52 near Hubballi	Karnataka	147	91
NH 68		(NH15) Jaisalmer, Barmer, Sanchore, Tharad, Bhabhar, Radhanpur, Kamalpur, Khakhal, Roda, Dunawada, Patan, Chansama, Mahesana, Kherva, Gojairiya, Sama, Churada, Kuvadara, NH48 near Prantij	Rajasthan, Gujarat	660	410
NH 68	168	NH68 near Tharad, Dhanera, Panthvada; NH62 near Sirohi	Gujarat, Rajasthan	158	98
NH 68	168A	NH68 near Sanchore, Dhanera, NH27 near Deesa, NH 68 near Patan	Rajasthan, Gujarat	126	78
NH 68	168B (earlier was 68EXT)	Tharad, Diyodar, Harij, Becharaji, Vitthalapur, Kalol, Mansaha, NH48 near Prantij	Gujarat	264	164
NH 68	168G	Mahesana, Visnagar, Vadnagar (Namopur), Rasukheralu, Idar, Shripur Shamlaji Dham	Gujarat	136	85
NH 68	368	NH68 near Suigam, Radhanpur, Sami, Shankheshwar, Becharaji, Mahesana	Gujarat	165	103
NH 68	568	NH325 near Jalore, Ramseen, Jaswantpura, NH27 near Abu Road	Rajsthan	132	82
NH 68	768	NH68 near Barmer, Sindhari, Sayla, Jalore	Rajasthan	157	98
NH 68	968	NH-68 near Mokhla, Bhadrasar, Charanwala and terminating at Sanchu near Pakistan border	Rajasthan	245	152
NH 69		(NH206) NH66 near Honnavar, Shimoga, (NH234) Banavar, Hulyar, Sira, Madhugiri, Chintamani, (NH4) Mulbagal, Palmaner, NH40 near Chittor	Karnataka, Andhra Pradesh	625	388
NH 69	169	(NH13) NH69 near Shimoga, Tirthahalli, Koppa, Karkal, NH66 near Mangalore	Karnataka	215	134
NH 69	169A	NH-169 near Thirthahalli, Agumbe, Hebri, NH-66 near Udupi	Karnataka	87	54
NH 69	369	(NH13) NH69 near Bhadravathi, Channagiri, Holalkere, NH48 near Chitradurga	Karnataka	105	65
NH 69	369A	NH69 near Shimoga, NH74 near Channagiri	Karnataka	44	27
NH 69	369E	NH69 near Sagar, Huvinahalli, Holebaglu, Kalasavalli, Sighanadoor, NH766C near Marakutuka	Karnataka	67.2	41.8
NH 70		NH25 near Munabao, Myajlar, Sam, Bandha, 1971 Shaheedsthal Longewala, NH68 near Tanot	Rajasthan	309	192
NH 70	170	NH70 near Sam, Kuldhara, Jaislamer, Jaisalpur, Pithala, NH70 near Boran	Rajasthan	90	56
NH 70	170	NH70 near Jaislamer, Lodurwva, Roopsi, NH70 near Khuyiwala	Rajasthan	65	40
NH 70	370	NH70 near Jaislamer, Bhoo, Digri, Bogniyai	Rajasthan	91	57
NH 70	170	NH70 near Satto, Bandhara, Bogniyai, NH68 near Vinjorai	Rajasthan	106	66
NH 71		(NH205) NH42 near Madanpalle, Pileru-Tirupati, NH716 near Renigunta, NH16 near Nayudupeta (to be merged with NH716 as part of Chennai-Hyderabad Expressway Project)	Andhra Pradesh	190.6	118.4
NH 72		NH48 near Hiriyur, NH69 at Huliyar, NH73 at Tiptur, Gandasi, NH75 near Hassan, Arkalgud, Piriyapatna, Gonikoppal, Virajpet, Bhagamandala, Panathur, Kuttikol, NH66 near Cherkala	Karnataka, Kerala	404	251
NH 72	172	NH72 near Virajpet, Madikeri, Somwarpet, Arkalagud, Holenarasipur, Shanthigrama, Arsikere, Panchanahalli on NH69	Karnataka	237	147
NH 72	172A	NH72-NH48 near Hiriyur, Amarapuram, Madakasira, NH44 near Penukonda	Karnataka, Andhra Pradesh	133	83
NH 72	272	NH72 near Tiptur, Channarayapatna, Krishnarajpet, Srirangapatna	Karnataka	123	76
NH 72	372	NH72-NH150A near Huliyar, Srirampura, Belaguru, NH69 near Kadur	Karnataka	70	43
NH 73		(NH234) NH66 near Mangaluru, Mudigere, Belur, Halebeedu, Banavara, Arsikere, Tiptur, NH48 near Tumkur	Karnataka	324	201
NH 73	173	NH73 near Mudigere, Chikkamagaluru, NH69 near Kadur, Mugali, NH72 near Hosadurga, Holalkere, Chikkajajuru, Maykonda, NH48 near Anagodu	Karnataka	196	122
NH 73	373	NH73 near Belur, Hassan, Holenarasipura, Krishnarajanagara, NH275 near Bilikere	Karnataka	130	81
NH 74		NH69 near Birur, Channagiri, Shantisagara, Davanagere, Harihar, Harapanahalli, Kotturu, Kudligi, Sandur, Hosapete, Kampli, Gangavathi, Karatagi, NH150A near Sindhanur, Manvi, NH167 near Raichur	Karnataka	459	285
NH 74	174	NH74 near Channagiri, Santhebennur, Chitradurga, Challakere, Pavagada, NH44 near Penukonda	Karnataka, Andhra Pradesh	223	139
NH 74	374	NH74 near Sindhanur, Kushtagi, Gajendragad, Vikrantha, Rona, NH52 near Nargund	Karnataka	161	100
NH 75		(NH48) NH73 near Bantwal, Shiradi, Sakleshpura, Hassan, Channarayapatna, Kunigal, Nelamangala, Bengaluru, Kolar, Bangarapet, Bethamangala, Venkatagirikota, Pernampet, Gudiyattam, Katpadi, NH48 near Vellore	Karnataka, Tamil Nadu	567	352
NH 75	175	NH75 near Kunigal, Shimsha, Maddur, Malavalli, Kollegala, Hanur, Male Mahadeshwara, Kolathur, Mettur Dam	Karnataka, Tamil Nadu	232	144
NH 75	175K	NH175 near Kollegala, Dhondenling, NH948 near Talamalai	Karnataka, Tamil Nadu	78.3	48.7
NH 75	275	NH75 near Bantwal, Puttur, Sullia, Madikeri, Kushalnagara, Bylakuppe, Hunsur, Mysuru, Srirangapatna, Mandya, Ramanagaram, NH75 near Bengaluru (Bangalore)	Karnataka	361	224
NH 75	275K	NH275 near Hinkal village, NH275/NH150A near Columbia Asia Hospital, NH766/NH150A near APMC Bandipalya, NH275 near Hinkal Village around Mysore city	Karnataka	41.5	25.8
NH 75	375	NH75 near Kolar, Nh69 near Mulbagal, NH42 near Venkatagirikota	Karnataka, Andhra Pradesh	55	34
NH 76		NH67 near Guntakal, Uruvakonda, Kanekal, Rayadurgam, Kotturu, Huvina-Hadagali, Mundargi, NH67 near Gadag	Karnataka	276	171
NH 76	176	NH76/NH67 near Ballari, Kanekal Cross, Kalyandurg, Tagarakunta, Mukthapuram, Dharmavaram, NH342 near Puttaparthi (Sri Satya Sai Prasanthi Nilayam)	Karnataka	182	113
NH 76	576	NH76 near Uruvakonda, Palthur, Kammarachedu, Ballari, Janekunte, Kudatini, Darji, Kampli, NH74 near Gangavathi	Karnataka	112	70
NH 77		NH48 near Krishnagiri, Uthangarai, Harur, Tiruvannamalai, Gingee, NH32 near Tindivanam, Puducherry	Tamil Nadu	225	140
NH 77	177	NH77 near Tiruvannamalai, Thanipadi, Harur, Dharmapuri	Tamil Nadu	126	78
NH 77	177A	NH77 near Tiruvannamalai, Thirukoilur, Arasur, Panruti Cuddalore	Tamil Nadu	117	73
NH 77	177B	NH77 near Chengam, Polur, Chetpet, Vandavasi, NH179B near Melmaruvathur	Tamil Nadu	139	86
NH 77	177C	NH77 near Tindivanam, Thellar, Vandavasi, NH48 near Kanchipuram, Arakkonam, NH716/NH71 near Thiruttani	Tamil Nadu	132	82
NH 77	377	NH77 near Singarapettai, Tirupathur, NH48 near Bargur	Tamil Nadu	63	39
NH 78		NH40 near Naraharipeta, Katpadi, Vellore, Alangalayam, Tirupattur, Pochampalli, Dharmapuri, Pennagaram, Hogenakkal Pumarathukuzi, Sivalingapuram, Anchetty	Andhra Pradesh, Tamil Nadu	260	160
NH 78	178	NH78 near Anchetty, Denkanikottai, NH48 near Hosur	Tamil Nadu	52	32
NH 79		(NH68) NH44 near Salem, Attur, Kallakurichi, NH38 near Ulundurpettai, Vridhhachalam, Bhuvangiri, NH 32 near Chidambaram	Tamil Nadu	210	130
NH 79	179A	NH79 near Salem, Ayothiapattinam, Pappireddipatti, Harur, Uthangarai, Thirupathur, Jolarpettai, NH48 near Vaniyambadi	Tamil Nadu	140	87
NH 79	179B	NH77 near Tindivadnam, Melmaruvuthur, Chengalpattu, NH48 near Poonamallee, Chennai	Tamil Nadu	116	72
NH 79	179D	NH38 near Villupuram, Gingee, Chetpet, Arani, Arcot (Arakottam)	Tamil Nadu	119	74
NH 80		NH32 near Sayalgudi, Paramakudi, Karaikudi, Aranthangi, Pattukottai, Mannargudi, NH83 near Thiruvarur	Tamil Nadu	265	165
NH 80	180	NH80 near Sayalgudi, Aruppukkottai, Virudhunagar, Alagapuri, Watrap	Tamil Nadu	119	74
NH 80	280	NH80 near Sayalgudi, Vilathikulam, Kovilpatti, NH44 near Sattur, Sivakasi	Tamil Nadu	110	68
NH 80	380	NH36 near Kumbakonam, Mannargudi, Thiruthuraipoondi, Kodiyakarai (Calimere Point)	Tamil Nadu	114	71
NH 80	380A	NH362 near Sirkali, Mayiladuthurai, Thiruvarr, Thiruthuraipoondi	Tamil Nadu	90	56
NH 81		(NH67) NH544 near Coimbatore, Palladam, Karur, Krishnarayapuram, (NH227) Tiruchirappalli, Lalgudi, Kallakudi, Kizhapalur, Udaiyarpalaiyam, Jayamkondacholapuram, Gangaikondacholapuram, Kattumannarkoil, Komarakshi, NH32 near Chidambaram	Tamil Nadu	340	210
NH 81	181	(NH67) NH81 near Coimbatore, Mettuppalayam, Udagamandalam (Ooty), Gudalur, NH766 near Gundulpet	Karnataka, Tamil Nadu	211	131
NH 81	381	NH544 in Avinashi, Tirupur, NH81 near Avinashipalaiym	Tamil Nadu	31.8	19.8
NH 81	381A	NH81 near Vellakoil, Mettupalayam, Ayyampalayam, Kumarandisavadi, Muthur, Muthainvalasu, Elumathur, Modakuruchi, Thannerpanthal, Sakthi Nagar (in Erode), Pallipalayam, Veppadai, Padaiveedu, NH544 near Sankakiri	Tamil Nadu	72	45
NH 81	381B	NH81 near Musiri, Thottiyam, Ezlurpatty, Meikalnaikanpatty, NH44 near Namakkal, Tiruchengode, Erode, Athani, Sathyamangalam, Mettupalayam,	Tamil Nadu	216	134
NH 82		NH87 near Parthibanur (Parathibannur, Manamadurai), Kamudi, Aruppukkottai, NH44 near Virudhunagar, Sivakasi, Srivilliputhur, Rajapalayam, Sankarankoil, Devarkulam, Tirunelveli, Srivaikuntam, Thiruchendur, NH32 near Thoothukudi	Tamil Nadu	334	208
NH 82	182	NH82 near Thiruchendur, Kulasekharapatnam, Udangudi, Kommadikottai, Uvari, Koodankulam, NH44 near Anjugramam	Tamil Nadu	83	52
NH 82	182A	NH82 near Uvari, Thisayanvilai, NH44 near Nanguneri Kalakkad	Tamil Nadu	52	32
NH 82	382	NH82 near Thamirabarani, Nazareth, Sathankulam, Mannarpuram, Kallikulam, Valiur, Rahdapuram, Vijayapathi	Tamil Nadu	88	55
NH 82	382A	NH82 near Tirunelveli, Maniyachi, Kurukkuchalai, NH32 near Kulathur	Tamil Nadu	64	40
NH 83		(NH209) NH544 near Coimbatore, Pollachi, Udumalaipettai, Palani, (NH45) Dindigul (NH67) Tiruchchirappalli, Thanjavur, Thiruvarur, NH32 near Nagapattinam	Tamil Nadu	414	257
NH 83	183	(NH45) NH83 near Dindigul, (NH220) NH85 near Teni, Uttamapalayam, Cumbum, NH185 near Kumily, NH183A near Vandiperiyar, Peermedu, Mundakkayam, Kanjirappali, Kodungoor, Pampady, Kottayam, Changanassery, Chengannur, NH183A near Bharanikavu, NH744 near Kundara, Anchalumoodu, Thevally, NH66 near Kollam	Kerala, Tamil Nadu	322	200
NH 83	183A	NH183 near Vandiperiyar, Gavi, Plappally, Lahai, Perunad, Vadasserikkara, Kumplampoika, Mannarakulanji, Mylapra, Pathanamthitta, Omalloor, Kaipattoor, Thatta, Anandapally, Adoor, Kadampanad, Bharanikavu, Sasthamkotta, NH-66 near Titanium Junction in Kollam Metropolitan Area	Kerala	157	98
NH 83	283	Starting from NH-83 near Dindigul and terminating at its junction with NH-81 at Karur	Tamil Nadu	76.3	47.4
NH 83	383	NH-83 near Dindigul connecting Kosavapatti, Sanarpatti, Gopalpatti, Natham, Samuthirapatti and terminating at its junction with NH-38 near Kottampatty, Thalakavoor	Tamil Nadu	98	61
NH 83	383A	NH-83 near Pollachi connecting Dharamapuram and terminating at its junction with NH-81 near Karur	Tamil Nadu	124	77
NH 84		NH544 near Avinashi, Tiruppur, NH81 near Palladam, Udumalaipettai, Munnar, Poppara, Nedumkandam, NH183 near Kumily	Tamil Nadu, Kerala	256	159
NH 84	184	NH84 near Tiruppur, Kunnathur, Gobichettipalayam, Sathyamangalam	Tamil Nadu	68.4	42.5
NH 84	384	NH84 near Palladam, Dharapuram, Palani	Tamil Nadu	80	50
NH 85		(NH49) NH66 near Kochi, Ernakulam, Moovttupuzha, Kothamangalam, Neriamangalam, Adimali, Munnar, Devikulam, Bodi, Theni, Madurai, (NH230) Tiruppuvanam, Sivaganga, Kalayarkoil, Tondi point	Kerala, Tamil Nadu	414	257
NH 85	185	NH85 near Adimali, Keerithodu, Thadiyampad, Cheruthoni, Vellayamkudi, Kattappana, Anavilasam, NH183 near Kumily	Kerala	84	52
NH 85	385	NH85 near Lockhart's Gap, Bison Valley, Rajakkad, NH85 near Poppara	Kerala	45	28
NH 85	585	NH85 near Munnar, Mattupetty, Kundala, Top Station, Magic Valley	Kerala, Tamil Nadu	50	31
NH 85	785	Pandian Hotel Junction in Madurai, Naganagulam, Ayyar, Bungalow, Oomachikulam, Vembarali, Vathipatti, Chatthirapatti, Chinnapatti, Natham, NH38 near Tovarankurichchi	Tamil Nadu	60.3	37.5
NH 86		NH32 near Mimisalam, Aranthangi, Pudukkottai, Manapparai, Kulithalai, Kannanur, Namakkal, NH44 near Rasipuram	Tamil Nadu	324	201
NH 86	186	Thuvarankurichi, Manapparai, Kulithulai, Nochiyam, Lalgudi on NH81	Tamil Nadu	123	76
NH 86	386	NH79 near Attur, Thammampatti, Thuraiyur, Nochiyam	Tamil Nadu	100	62
NH 86	786	NH81 near Karur, Vaiyampatti, Manapparai	Tamil Nadu	79	49
NH 87		NH44 near Madurai, Manamadurai, Ramanathapuram, Mandapam, Rameswaram, Dhanushkodi	Tamil Nadu	196	122

- NH no. - highway number
- OSM rel. - relation identifier and link to the road in OpenStreetMap
- States - states through which the highway runs
- Length - total length of the highway in kilometers
- Route - major towns along the route with the previous highway numbers shown in parentheses

== Summary ==
NH44 is the longest north–south oriented highway while NH27 is the longest east–west oriented highway in India.

State-wise summary of NHs
S.no.	State/UT	Length (km)
1	Andhra Pradesh	6,913
2	Arunachal Pradesh	2,537
3	Assam	3,909
4	Bihar	5,358
5	Chhattisgarh	3,606
6	Goa	293
7	Gujarat	6,635
8	Haryana	3,166
9	Himachal Pradesh	2,607
10	Jharkhand	3,367
11	Karnataka	7,335
12	Kerala	1,782
13	Madhya Pradesh	8,772
14	Maharashtra	17,757
15	Manipur	1,750
16	Meghalaya	1,156
17	Mizoram	1,423
18	Nagaland	1,548
19	Odisha	5,762
20	Punjab	3,274
21	Rajasthan	10,618
22	Sikkim	463
23	Tamil Nadu	6,742
24	Telangana	3,795
25	Tripura	854
26	Uttar Pradesh	11,737
27	Uttarakhand	2,949
28	West Bengal	3,664
29	Andaman and Nicobar Islands	331
30	Chandigarh	15
31	Dadra and Nagar Haveli and Daman and Diu	53
32	Delhi	157
33	Jammu and Kashmir and Ladakh	2,423
34	Puducherry	27
	Total	140,995

== See also ==
- List of national highways in India by state
- List of national highways in India by union territory
- List of national highways in India by state (old numbering)
