= National Highway 353C (India) =

National Highway in India

National Highway 353C
- Map of the National Highway in red

Route information
- Auxiliary route of NH 53
- Length: 424 km (263 mi)

Major junctions
- North end: NH53 near Sakoli
- NH 543 Desaiganj NH 353D Armori NH 930 Gadchiroli NH 353B Ashti NH 130D Allapalli NH 63 Sironcha
- South end: Atmakur

Location
- Country: India
- States: Maharashtra, Telangana
- Primary destinations: Sakoli, Lakhandur, Wadsa, Armori, Gadchiroli, Chamorshi, Ashti, Allapalli, Sironcha

Highway system
- Roads in India; Expressways; National; State; Asian
← NH 53	→ NH 163

National Highway 353C commonly called NH353C, is a national highway in India. It is a spur road of National Highway 53. It traverses the states of Maharashtra and Telangana in India.

== Route ==
Maharashtra

Sakoli, Lakhandur, Wadsa, Armori, Gadchiroli, Chamorshi, Ashti, Allapalli, Sironcha - Telangana.

Telangana

Maharashtra - Parkal, Atmakur.

== Junctions ==
NH 53 Terminal near Sakoli
NH 543 near Desaiganj
NH 353D near Armori
NH 930 near Gadchiroli
NH 353B near Ashti
NH 130D near Allapalli
NH 63 near Sironcha
NH 163 Terminal near Atmakur

== See also ==
- List of national highways in India
- List of national highways in India by state

== Notes ==
- In first notification for S.N. 194A, route Sironcha to Atmakur was named as NH-363. This has been replaced as NH-353C with extended route from Sakoli.
