= List of environmental laws by country =

This article lists the most important national environmental laws by continent and country.

== Africa ==
=== Egypt ===
- Egyptian Law 102 of 1983, for Nature Protectorates
- Environmental Protection Law 4/1994 amended by Law 9/2009(Egypt)
- Law 48/1982

Concerning the Protection of Nile River and Water Channels

- Law 124/83

Concerning Fishing, Aquatic Life Organization of Fisheries

- Law 93/1962

Concerning Discharge of Liquid Wastes

- Law 27/1978

Concerning Organizing General Water Resources for Drinking and Human Use

=== Kenya ===
- Biosafety Act 2009
- Environmental (Impact Assessment and Audit) Regulations, 2003
- Environmental Management and Co-ordination (Conservation of Biological Diversity and Resources, Access to Genetic Resources and Benefit Sharing) Regulations, 2006
- Environmental Management and Co-ordination (Controlled Substances) Regulations 2007
- Environmental Management and Co-ordination (Noise and Excessive Vibration Pollution) (Control) Regulations 2009
- Environmental Management and Co-ordination (Waste Management) Regulations 2006
- Environmental Management and Co-ordination (Water Quality) Regulations 2006
- Environmental Management and Co-ordination (Wetlands, Riverbanks, Lake Shores and Sea Shore Management) Regulations 2009
- Environmental Management and Co-ordination Act 1999 / no 8
- Environmental (Prevention Of Pollution In Coastal Zone And Other Segments Of The Environment) Regulation, 2003
- Fisheries Act (Chapter 378)
- Forests Act (Chapter 385)
- The Forests Act, 2005
- Kenya Tourist Development Authority (Chapter 382)
- Kenya's Environment Management and Coordination Act 1999
- Noise Regulations
- Timber Act (Chapter 386)
- Tourist Industry Licensing Act (Chapter 381)
- Water Act 2002
- Water Act 2002 / no 8
- Wildlife (Conservation and Management) Act (Chapter 376)

== Asia ==
=== China ===
- Air Pollution Control Act (China)
- Animal Epidemic Prevention Law 1997
- Basic Environment Act
- Drinking Water Management Act
- Environmental Impact Assessment Act
- Environmental Protection Law 1989
- Environmental Protection Law of the People's Republic of China (For Trial Implementation) 1979
- Fisheries Law 1986
- Fisheries Law (2004 Revision)
- Flood Control Law 1997
- Forestry Law 1985
- Forestry Law of the People's Republic of China (1998)
- Grassland Law 1985
- Law of the People's Republic of China on the Prevention and Control of Environmental Pollution by Solid Waste
- Law of the People's Republic of China on Prevention and Control of Pollution from Environmental Noise
- Law of the People's Republic of China on Prevention and Control of Water Pollution
- Law of the People's Republic of China on Water and Soil Conservation
- Law on Desert Prevention and Transformation 2001
- Law on Marine Environment Protection 1983
- Law on Mineral Resources 1986
- Law on the Prevention and Control of Atmospheric Pollution
- Law on Prevention and Control of Atmospheric Pollution 2000
- Law on the Prevention and Control of Environmental Noise Pollution 1997
- Law on the Prevention and Control of Solid Wastes Pollution
- Law on Prevention and Control of Water Pollution 1996
- Law on Promoting Clean Production 2002
- Law on Protecting Against and Mitigating Earthquake Disasters
- Law on the Protection of Cultural Relics
- Law on the Protection of Wildlife 1989
- Law on the Protection of Wildlife (2004 Revision)
- Law on Water and Soil Conservation
- Marine Environmental Protection Law of the People's Republic of China (1983)
- Marine Pollution Control Act
- Public Nuisance Dispute Mediation Act
- Soil and Groundwater Pollution Remediation Act
- Water Law 1988
- Water Law 2002 (the modified edition)
- Water Pollution Control Act (China)
- Wildlife Protection Law

=== India ===
- Water (Prevention and Control of Pollution) Act, 1974
- The Water (Prevention and Control of Pollution) cess act, 1977
- Air (Prevention and Control of Pollution) Act, 1981
- Biological Diversity Act, 2002
- Environment (Protection) Act, 1986
- Forest Conservation Act, 1980
- Hazardous Waste Handling and Management Rules, 1989
- Indian Forest Act, 1927
- The National Environment Tribunal Act, 1995
- National Green Tribunal Act, 2010
- Noise Pollution rule, 2000
- Protection of Plant Varieties and Farmers' Rights Act of 2001
- Public Liability Insurance Act, 1991
- The Scheduled Tribes and Other Traditional Forest Dwellers (Recognition of Forest Rights) Act, 2006
- Water (Prevention and Control of Pollution), 1974
- Wild Life (Protection) Amendment Act, 2002
- Wildlife Protection Act of 1972

=== Japan ===
- Air Pollution Control Law
- Basic Environment Law
- Environmental Impact Assessment law
- Fisheries Law No 267 of 1949
- Fundamental Law for Establishing a Sound Material-Cycle Society
- Invasive Alien Species Act (Law No. 78, June 2, 2004)
- Law concerning the Conservation and Sustainable Use of Biological Diversity through Regulation on the Use of Living Modified Organisms
- Law Concerning the Promotion of Business Activities with Environmental Consideration by Specified Corporations, etc., by Facilitating Access to Environmental Information, and Other Measures
- Law Concerning the Promotion of the Measures to Cope with Global Warming
- Law Concerning the Protection of the Ozone Layer Through the Control of Specified Substances and Other Measures (May 1988)
- Law Concerning the Promotion of Procurement of Eco-Friendly Goods and Services by the State and Other Entities
- Law concerning the Rational Use of Energy
- Law concerning the Recovery and Destruction of Fluorocarbons (Fluorocarbons Recovery and Destruction Law) (June 2001)
- Law Concerning Reporting etc. of Releases to the Environment of Specific Chemical Substances and Promoting Improvements in Their Management
- Law Concerning Special Measures against Dioxins
- Law for the Control of Export, Import and Others of Specified Hazardous Wastes and Other Wastes
- Law for Enhancing Motivation on Environmental Conservation and Promoting of Environmental Education
- Law for the Promotion of Nature Restoration
- Law on Special Measures concerning Removal of Environmental Problems Caused by Specified Industrial Wastes
- Law relating to Protection of the Environment in Antarctica
- Noise Regulation Law
- NOx Law (Japan)
- Offensive Odor Control Law
- Studded Tires Regulation Law
- Vibration Regulation Law
- Waste Management and Public Cleansing Law
- Water Pollution Control Law
- Wildlife Protection and Hunting Law

=== Kyrgyzstan ===
- Law on Animal World, 1999
- Law on Biosphere Areas in Kyrgyz Republic, 1999
- Law on Environment Protection, 1999
- Law on Environmental Expertise, 1999
- Law on General Technical Regulations ensuring Environmental Safety in Kyrgyz Republic, 2009
- Law on Protection and Use of Flora, 2001
- Law on Protection of Atmospheric Air, 1999
- Law on Protection of Ozone Layer, 2006
- Law on Radiation Safety of Population of Kyrgyz Republic, 1999
- Law on Renewable Energy Sources, 2008
- Law on Specially Protected Natural Territories, 2011
- Law on Sustainable Development of Environmental and Economic System Yssyk-Kul, 2004
- Law on Tailing Ponds and Mine Wastes, 2001
- Law on Waste of Production and Use, 2001
- Law on Water, 1994

=== Pakistan ===
- Pakistan Environmental Protection Act 1997
- Sindh Environmental Protection Act 2014

=== Philippines ===
- Philippine Environmental Impact Statement System
- Fisheries Act of 1932
- Philippine Environment Code
- Revised Forestry Code of the Philippines
- Water Code of the Philippines
- Pollution Control Law (Presidential Decree 1181; 1977)
- Philippine Environmental Impact Statement System (Presidential Decree 1586; 1978)
- Food Security Act of 1985
- Toxic Substances and Hazardous and Nuclear Waste Control Act of 1990
- Philippine Mining Act of 1995
- Animal Welfare Act of 1998
- Philippine Fisheries Code of 1998
- Clean Air Act of 1999
- Philippine Ecological Waste and Solid Management Act of 2000
- Wildlife Resources Conservation and Protection Act of 2001
- Chain Saw Act of 2002
- Philippine Plant Variety Protection Act of 2002
- Clean Water Act of 2004
- Environmental Awareness and Education Act of 2008
- Climate Change Act of 2009

=== Singapore ===
- Environmental Protection and Management Act (Cap 94A)
- Hazardous Waste (Control of Export, Import and Transit) Act (Cap. 122A)
- Parks and Trees Act (Cap. 216) and its associated regulations, the Parks and Trees Regulations (Cap. 216 Section 63) aimed at regulating conduct within parks and nature reserves.
- Wildlife Act (Cap. 351) aimed at protecting named species of plant, animal and fungi in Singapore
- Endangered Species (Import and Export) Act (Cap. 92A) aimed at preventing the trade of wildlife protected under Convention on International Trade in Endangered Species (CITES)
- Carbon Pricing Act (No. 23 of 2018) aimed at regulating and limiting the carbon footprint of corporate bodies in Singapore.
- Resource Sustainability Act (No. 29 of 2019) aimed at conserving existing resources and materials.

=== Sri Lanka ===
- National Environmental Act 1980
- First Forest Policy 1929
- Fauna and Flora Protection Ordinance 1937

=== Taiwan ===
- National Park Act 1972
- Water Pollution Control Act 1974
- Waste Disposal Act 1974
- Air Pollution Control Act 1975
- Cultural Heritage Preservation Act 1982
- Noise Control Act 1983
- Toxic and Concerned Chemical Substances Control Act 1986
- Wildlife Conservation Act 1989
- Environmental Impact Assessment Act 1994
- Soil and Groundwater Pollution Remediation Act 2000
- Marine Pollution Control Act 2000
- Environmental Protection Basic Act 2002
- Resource Recycling Act 2002
- Climate Change Response Act 2015 (renamed and substantially revised in 2023)

== Europe ==
=== Austria ===
- Animal Protection Act
- Environmental Impact Assessment Act 2000
- Federal Act dated 27th November 1984 – for comprehensive protection of the environment
- Federal Act No. 33/1998 on Trade of Wild Flora and Fauna
- Federal Law amending the Species Trade Act
- Forstgesetz 1975
- Lebensmittelsicherheits und Verbraucherschutzgesetz (LMSVG) 2006
- Umweltinformationsgesetzes (UIG)

=== Belarus ===
- Article 131 Ecocide Law

=== Belgium ===
- Loi du 20 janvier 1999 sur la protection du milieu marin dans les espaces marins sous juridiction de la Belgique
- Loi du 22 avril 1999 sur la zone économique exclusive de la Belgique dans la mer du Nord
- Wet van 20 januari 1999 tot bescherming van het mariene milieu in de zeegebieden onder de rechtsbevoegdheid van België
- Wet van 22 april 1999 betreffende de exclusieve economische zone van België in de Noordzee

=== Bulgaria ===
- Agricultural Producers' Protection Act
- Amendments to the Law on protection of the environment
- Biological Diversity Act, 2002
- Environmental Protection Act 2002
- Forestry Act
- Law for Hunting and Protection of the Game
- Law of Preservation of Environment
- Law of the Purity of Atmospheric Air
- Law on obligations to the international reimbursement of damages from oil pollution fund
- Law on Protection against Harmful Impact of Chemical Substances and Preparations
- Law on Tourism
- Law on Waste Management 2003 (State Gazette No 86/2003)
- Medicinal Plants Act 2000 (State Gazette No 29/2000)
- Nature Protection Act
- Protected Areas Act 1998 (State Gazette No 133/1998)
- Protection of Waters and Soil against Pollution Act
- Regulation on the terms and conditions for carrying out Environmental Impact Assessment (SG 25/18.03.2003)
- Regulations for implementation of the Law for the forests
- Water Act 1999 (State Gazette No. 67/27.1999)

=== Cyprus ===
- Air Quality Law 188(I)/2002
- Air Quality Law (Air Pollution by Ozone) Regulations P.I. 530/2002
- Air Quality Law (Amendment) Law 53(I)/2004
- Air Quality Law (Annual Emission Ceilings for Certain Atmospheric Pollutants) Regulations P.I. 193/2004
- Air Quality Law (Limit Values for Benzene and Carbon Monoxide in Ambient Air) Regulations P.I. 516/2002
- Air Quality (Ozone in Ambient Air) Regulations P.I. 194/2004
- Control of Atmospheric Pollution (Control of Volatile Organic Compounds Emissions Resulting from the Storage of Petrol and its Distribution from Terminals to Service Stations) Regulations P.I. 76/2003
- Control of Atmospheric Pollution (Incineration of Hazardous Wastes) Regulations P.I. 638/2002
- Control of Atmospheric Pollution (Incineration of Waste Oils) Regulations P.I. 529/2002
- Control of Atmospheric Pollution (Incineration of Wastes) Regulations P.I. 284/2003
- Control of Atmospheric Pollution Law 187(I)/2002
- Control of Atmospheric Pollution (Limitation and Control of Atmospheric Pollution caused by Waste from Titanium Dioxide Industry) Regulations P.I. 527/2002
- Control of Atmospheric Pollution (Limitation of Emissions of Certain Pollutants into Air from Large Combustion Plants) Regulations P.I. 195/2004
- Control of Atmospheric Pollution (Limitation of Volatile Organic Compounds due to the Use of Organic Solvents in Certain Activities and Installations) Regulations P.I. 73/2003
- Control of Atmospheric Pollution (Non Licensable Installations) Regulations P.I. 170/2004
- Control of Atmospheric Pollution (Prevention and Reduction of Atmospheric Pollution by Asbestos) Regulations P.I. 528/2002
- Control of Atmospheric Pollution (Prevention of Air Pollution from Existing Municipal Incineration Plants) Regulations P.I. 75/2003
- Control of Atmospheric Pollution (Procedures for the Surveillance and Monitoring of Environments concerned by Waste from Titanium Dioxide Industry) Regulations P.I. 545/2002
- Forest Law 1967
- Integrated Pollution Prevention and Control Law 56(I)/2003
- Law 77(I)/2010 for the Quality of Atmospheric Air
- Protection from Ionising Radiation Law 115(I)/2002
- Regulation 327/2010 regarding the Quality of Atmospheric Air

=== Czech Republic ===
- Act 1991 - 2 Collective Bargaining Act
- Act 1992 - 1 on Wages, Remuneration for Stand-Bye, and Average Earnings
- Act 1992 - 114 on the protection of nature and Landscape
- Act 1995 - 289 Forest Act
- Act 2001 - 100 on environmental impact assessment
- Act 2001 - 185 on Waste
- Act 2001 - 254 Water Act
- Act 2002 - 521 on integrated pollution prevention and control (amendment)
- Act 2004 - 99 on Fishery
- Act 2005 - 7 amending Act No. 185/2001 – Coll. on waste and on amendment to some other laws
- Decree 2004 – 382 – on the protection of farm animals at the time of slaughter, killing or other ways of putting to death
- Decree 2005 – 424 – amending Decree No 382/2004 Coll. on the protection of farm animals at the time of slaughter, killing or other ways of putting to death
- Decree 2006 – 346 – on laying down more detailed conditions of keeping and training of animals
- Decree 2008 – 411 – specifying animal species requiring special care
- Decree 2009 – 3 – on professional competence for the performance of supervision in the field of protection of animals against cruelty
- Decree 2009 – 4 – on the protection of animals during transport
- Decree 2009 – 5 – on the protection of animals at a public performance and in breeding
- Regulation 2003 on the Waste Management Plan of the Czech Republic

=== Denmark ===
- Act on Access to Information on the Environment No. 292 of April 27, 1994
- Act on Environment and Genetic Engineering No. 356 of June 6, 1991
- Act on the Protection of the Marine Environment No. 476 of June 30, 1993
- Act on the Protection of the Marine Environment, the Safety of ships Act, and Merchant Shipping Act (Exclusive Economic Zones Act) No. 394 of May 22, 1996
- Act on Waste Deposits No. 420 of June 13, 1990
- Consolidated Act from the Ministry of the Environment on Watercourses No. 404 of May 19, 1992
- Consolidated Act on Chemical Substances and Products No. 21 of January 16, 1996
- Consolidated Act on Taxes on Waste and Raw Materials No. 570 of August 3, 1998
- Consolidated Act on Water Supply
- Consolidated Environment And Genetic Engineering Act No. 981 Of December 2002
- Consolidated Environmental Protection Act No. 698 of September 22, 1998
- Contaminated Soil Act No. 370 of June 2, 1999
- Danish Forest Act 1989 Act no 383

=== Estonia ===
- Deliberate Release into the Environment of Genetically Modified Organisms Act
- Earth's Crust Act
- Environmental Impact Assessment and Environmental Management System Act 2005
- Environmental Monitoring Act 1999 (amended until 2005)
- Environmental Supervision Act
- Forest Act 2007
- Hunting Act (Estonia)
- Law on Hunting Management
- Nature Conservation Act (Estonia)
- Tourism Act
- Tourism Law 2000
- Water Act

=== Finland ===
- Act on Compensation for Environmental Damage 1994
- Act on Environmental Permit Authorities 2000
- Act on the Financing of Sustainable Forestry
- Act on Implementation of the Legislation on Environmental Protection
- Act on Jointly Owned Forests
- Act on Metsähallitus
- Act on Trade in Forest Reproductive Material
- Act on Water Resources Management 2004
- Act on Water Services (119/2001)
- Animal Welfare Act (Finland)
- Animal Welfare Decree
- Decree on the Financing of Sustainable Forestry
- Environmental Damage Insurance Act
- Environmental Protection Act (Finland)
- Environmental Protection Decree
- Forest Act 1996
- Forest Decree
- Forest Management Association Act
- Forest Management Association Decree
- Government Decree on the Assessment of Soil Contamination and Remediation Needs
- Government Decree on Substances Dangerous and Harmful to the Aquatic Environment 2006
- Government Decree on Urban Waste Water Treatment 2006
- Hunting Act 1993
- Nature Conservation Act (1096/1996)
- Nature Conservation Decree 1997
- Waste Act (1072/1993)
- Waste Decree 1993
- Waste Oil Charge Act (894/1986)

=== France ===
- Code de l'environnement
- Code forestier
- Loi du 14 avril 2006 relative aux parcs nationaux, aux parcs naturels marins et aux parcs naturels régionaux
- Loi du 30 décembre 1996 sur l'air et l'utilisation rationnelle de l'énergie

=== Germany ===
- Law on Conservation and Environmental Care (Gesetz über Naturschutz und Landschaftspflege – Bundesnaturschutzgesetz – BNatSchG)
- Law on Protection for Environmental Harms due to Air Pollution, Noise, etc. (Gesetz zum Schutz vor schädlichen Umwelteinwirkungen durch Luftverunreinigungen, Geräusche, Erschütterungen und ähnliche Vorgänge – Bundes-Immissionsschutzgesetz – BImSchG)
- Regulation on Drinking Water Quality (Trinkwasserverordnung – TrinkwV)
- Regulation on Soil Protection (Bundesbodenschutzgesetz – BBSchG)
- Regulation on Waste Management (Kreislaufwirtschaftsgesetz – KrwG)
- Regulation on Water Usage (Wasserhaushaltsgesetz – WHG)

=== Greece ===
- Law 2939 Waste Law

=== Iceland ===
- Act on Protective Measures Against Avalanches and Landslides, 1997
- Act on Radiation Protection, 2002
- Emissions of Greenhouse Gases Act No. 65, 2007
- Environmental Impact Assessment Act (Iceland) No. 106, 25 May 2000
- Fisheries Management Act No. 38, 15 May 1990
- Nature Conservation Act

=== Ireland ===
- Air Pollution Act 1987
- Chemicals Act 2008
- Dumping at Sea (Amendment) Act 2004
- Fisheries (Amendment) Act 2003
- Foreshore and Dumping at Sea (Amendment) Act 2009
- Forestry Act 1988
- Forestry (Amendment) Act 2009
- Foyle and Carlingford Fisheries Act 2007
- Litter Pollution Act 1997
- No. 27/2003: Protection of the Environment Act 2003
- Oil Pollution of the Sea (Civil Liability and Compensation) (Amendment) Act 2003
- Protection of the Environment Act 2003
- Sea Pollution (Amendment) Act 1999
- Sea Pollution (Hazardous Substances)(Compensation) Act 2005
- Sea Pollution (Miscellaneous Provisions) Act 2006
- Waste Management (Amendment) Act 2001
- Water Services Act 2007
- Wildlife Act 1976
- Wildlife (Amendment) Act 2000
- Climate Action and Low Carbon Development 2015

=== Italy ===
- Decreto Presidente 1997 – 357 Regolamento recante attuazione della direttiva 92/43/CEE relativa alla conservazione degli habitat
- Law 1993 – 157 provisions for the protection of wildlife and restrictions on hunting
- Legge 2002 – 179 Disposizioni in materia ambientale
- Decreto Lgislativo Governo 3 aprile 2006, n. 152, Norme in materia ambientale.

=== Latvia ===
- Animal Protection Law
- Chemical Substances and Chemical Products Law
- Environmental Protection Law (Latvia)
- Fishery Law
- Forestry Law
- Hunting Law (2003)
- Law on Chemical Substances and Chemical Products
- Law on the Conservation of Species and Biotopes
- Law on End-of Life Vehicles Management
- Law on Environmental Impact Assessment (Latvia) (amended until 2005)
- Law on Environmental Protection (Latvia)
- Law on Pollution
- Law on Specially Protected Nature Territories (1993)
- Law on Subterranean Depths
- Packaging Law (9 January 2002)
- Protection Zone Law (5 February 1997)
- Regulation No. 118 – adopted on 12 March 2002; "Regulations regarding the Quality of Surface Waters and Groundwaters"
- Regulation No. 280 – adopted 24 April 2007; "General Procedures for the Issue of Licences for the Use of Subterranean Depths and Authorisations for the Extraction of Widespread Mineral Resources, and for the Use of Geological Information"
- Regulation No. 34 – "Regulations regarding Discharge of Polluting Substances into Water" (22 January 2002)
- Regulation No. 475 – "Procedures regarding the Cleaning and Deepening of Surface Water Bodies and Port Basins"; 13 June 2006
- Regulation No. 595 – adopted 18 July 2006 "Regulations regarding the Protection of the Environment during the Works of Exploration and Extraction of Hydrocarbons in the Sea"
- Regulation No. 736 – "Regulations Regarding a Permit for the Use of Water Resources"; 23 December 2003
- Regulation No. 779 – adopted 19 September 2006; "Procedures for the Extraction of Mineral Resources"
- Regulation No. 857 – "Regulations regarding Procedures for Ascertaining of Groundwater Resources and Criteria of Quality" 19 October 2004
- Regulations no 184 Requirements for Activities with Biocidal Products
- Regulations no 340 on Procedures for Import, Notification and Risk Assessment of New Chemical Substances (6 August 2002)
- Regulations on electrical and electronic equipment waste management (9 November 2004)
- Regulations Regarding the Limitation of Emissions of Volatile Organic Compounds from Certain Products
- Regulations Regarding Protection of Water and Soil from Pollution with Nitrates Caused by Agricultural Sources
- Regulations Regarding Restrictions and Prohibitions on Use and Marketing of Dangerous Chemical Substances and Dangerous Chemical Products
- Regulations Regarding Restrictions of the Use of Chemicals in Electric and Electronic Equipment
- Tourism Law
- Waste Management Law

=== Lithuania ===
- Environmental Protection Law (Lithuania)
- Forestry Law (Lithuania)
- Law on the Department Of Environmental Protection
- Law on Drinking Water Supply and Waste Water Management
- Law on Environmental Protection (Lithuania)
- Law on Financial Instruments for Climate Change management
- Law on Fisheries
- Law on the Management of Packaging and Packaging Waste
- Law on the Management of Radioactive Waste
- Law on Water
- The Underground Law

=== Luxembourg ===
- Code de l'Environnement
- Loi du 10 août 1993 relative aux parcs naturels
- Loi du 10 juin 1999 relative aux établissements classés
- Loi du 11 mars 2008 ayant pour objet d’autoriser le Gouvernement à subventionner l’exécution d’unhuitième palanquin quen nal del infrastructure touristique
- Loi du 14 avril 1992 portant réglementation de la mise sur le marché de substances qui appauvrissent la
- Loi du 19 décembre 2008 relative à l'eau
- Loi du 19 janvier 2004 concernant la protection de la nature et des ressources naturelles
- Loi du 19 novembre 2003 modifiant la loi du 10 juin 1999 relative aux établissements classés
- Loi du 25 avril 1970 modifiant et complétant la loi du 17 juillet 1960 portant institution d ´un statut de l ´hôtellerie
- Loi du 25 juin 2004, la loi relative à la coordination de la politique nationale de développement durable a été adoptée
- Loi du 28 mai 2004 portant création d’une Administration de la gestion de l’eau
- Loi du 6 juillet 1999 portant création d’un réseau national de pistes cyclables
- Loi modifiée du 21 juin 1976 relative à la lutte contre le bruit
- Règlement grand-ducal du 7 mars 2003 concernant l’évaluation des incidences de certains projets publics et privés sur l’environnement
- Règlement grand-ducal du 9 janvier 2009 concernant la protection intégrale et partielle de certaines espèces animales de la faune sauvage

=== Malta ===
- Clean Air Act (Malta)
- Filfla Nature Reserve Act
- Integrated Pollution Prevention & Control Regulations
- L.N. 13/2006 Control and Security of High-Activity Radioactive and Orphan
- L.N. 44/03 Nuclear Safety and Radiation Protection Regulations, 2003
- Litter Act
- Malta's International Obligations regarding Environmental Matters
- Management of Bathing Water Quality Regulations, 2008
- Prevention and Remedying of Environmental Damage Regulations, 2008
- Quality of Water Intended for Human Consumption Regulations, 2009
- Strategic Environmental Assessment Regulations, 2005
- Waste Management (Management of Waste from Extractive Industries and Backfilling) Regulations, 2009
- Waste Management (Waste Oils) Regulations
- Water Services Corporation Act
- Water Supply (Amendment) Regulations, 2008

=== Netherlands ===
- Boswet
- Cadmium Decree 1999 – rules for the manufacture and sale of products containing cadmium
- Environment Protection Act
- Environmental Management Act 2004
- Experiments on Animals Act 1997
- Flora en faunawet
- Groundwater Act
- Invoeringswet Waterwet
- Marine Pollution Act
- Natuurbeschermingswet 1998
- Ontgrondingenwet
- Soil Protection Act
- Waterleidingbesluit
- Waterleidingwet
- Waterwet 2008
- Wet beheer rijkswaterstaatswerken
- Wet Bodembescherming
- Wet Geluidhinder
- Wet milieubeheer
- Wet verontreiniging van oppervlaktewateren

=== Norway ===
- Act 13 March 1981 no 6 – relating to protection against pollution and relating to waste. Last amended by Act 10 December 1999 no 83
- Act on Radiation Protection and Use of Radiation 2000
- Act Relating to Biobanks 2003
- Animal Welfare Act 1974
- Cultural Heritage Act 1978
- Environmental Information Act 2003
- Finnmark Act (2005)
- Forestry Act 2005
- Gene Technology Act 1993
- Greenhouse Gas Emission Trading Act 2004
- Nature Conservation Act 1970
- Pollution Control Act (Norway)
- Pollution Control Act of 13 March 1981 No.6
- Regulations Relating to Pollution Control (pollution regulations)
- Regulations Relating to Restrictions on the Use of Chemicals and Other Products Hazardous to Health and the Environment (product regulations)
- Svalbard Environmental Protection Act 2001
- Waste Regulations (Norway)
- Water Resources Act 2000
- Watercourse Regulation Act 1917
- Wildlife Act 1981

=== Poland ===
- Act 1991 on Inspection for Environmental Protection
- Act 1997 Poland Animal Protection Act
- Act 2000 on Access to Information on the Environment and Its Protection and on Environmental Impact Assessments
- Act 2001 on Waste

=== Portugal ===
- Decreto-Lei 151B – de 31 de outubro de 2013 – aprova o regime jurídico da Avaliação de Impacte Ambiental (AIA)dos projetos públicos e privados suscetíveis de produzirem efeitos significativos no ambient.
- Decreto-Lei 1998 – 236 Lei da qualidade da agua
- Decreto-Lei 2007 – 306 Lei estabelece o regime da qualidade da água destinada ao consumo humano
- Lei 1959 – 2097 Lei de Bases do Fomento Piscícola nas Águas Interiores
- Lei 1987 – 11 Lei de Bases do Ambiente
- Lei 2005 – 58 Lei de Agua

=== Romania ===
- Law 1995-137 Environmental Protection Law
- Law 1996-107 Water Law
- Law 1996-26 Forest Code
- Law 2000-182 Regarding the Protection of the Movable National Heritage
- Law 2001-422 Protection of Historical Monuments
- Law 2006-407 Law on Hunting
- Law 2008-46 Forestry Code

=== Russia ===
- Forest Code of the Russian Federation
- Water Code of the Russian Federation

=== Slovakia ===
- Act 287 / 1994 – on the Preservation of Nature and Landscape
- Act No. 163/2001 – Coll. on Chemical Substances and Chemical Preparations
- Act No. 238/1991 – on the Collection of Waste
- Regulation 1993 – on the specification of areas requiring special protection of the atmosphere and on the operation of smog warning and control systems

=== Slovenia ===
- Act on protection against ionising radiation and nuclear safety
- Biocidal Products Act
- Chemicals Act
- Cosmetic Products Act
- Decree Amending the Decree on the Method, Subject and Conditions for the Provision of the Public Utility Service of Management of Abattoir Waste and Infectious Material of Animal Origin
- Decree on Amendments and Additions to the Decree on Noise in the Natural and Living Environment
- Decree on Amendments and Supplements to the Decree on Charges for the Loading of the Atmosphere with Carbon Dioxide Emissions
- Decree on changes and additions to the decree on the tax for the pollution of the air with emissions of carbon dioxide
- Decree on the Emission of Substances into the Atmosphere from Hazardous Waste Incineration Plants
- Decree on the emission of substances into the atmosphere from lacquering plants
- Decree on the Emission of Substances into the Atmosphere from Municipal Waste Incineration Plants
- Decree on the emission of substances into the atmosphere from plants for the production and processing of wood products
- Decree on the emission of substances into the atmosphere from plants for the production of lead and its alloys from secondary raw materials
- Decree on Emission of Volatile Organic Compounds into the Air from the Storage of Petrol and From its Distribution from Terminals to Service Stations
- Decree on the Export, Import and Transit of Wastes
- Decree on the Input of Dangerous Substances and Plant Nutrients into the Soil
- Decree on the Limit, Warning and Critical Concentration Values of Dangerous Substances in Soil
- Decree on the manner, subject and conditions for performing the commercial public service of managing radioactive waste
- Decree on Noise in the Natural and Living Environment
- Decree on Noise Owing to Road and Railway Traffic
- Decree on the quality of liquid fuels with regard to their sulphur, lead and benzene content
- Decree on the quantity of waste from the production of titanium dioxide discharged into water and on the emission of substances into the air from the production of titanium dioxide
- Decree on the tax for the pollution of the atmosphere with emissions of carbon dioxide
- Environment Protection Act (Slovenia)
- Forest Act
- Forest reproductive materials act
- Management of Genetically modified organisms Act
- Nature Conservation Act (Slovenia)
- Regulations on Changes and Additions to the Regulations on the Management of Wastes which Contain Toxic Substances
- Regulations on Initial Measurement of Noise and Operational Monitoring for Sources of Noise and on Conditions for their Execution
- Regulations on Initial Measurements and Operational Monitoring for Sources of Electromagnetic Radiation and on Conditions for Their Execution
- Rules on Amendments and Supplements to the Rules on Initial Measurements and Operational Monitoring of the Emission of Substances into the Atmosphere from Stationary Sources of Pollution, and on the Conditions for their Implementation
- Rules on amendments and supplements to the rules on waste management
- Rules on Authorizations for Biocidal Products Based on Mutual Recognition within the European Union
- Rules on the Disposal of Polychlorinated Biphenyls and Polychlorinated Terphenys
- Rules on the form for the notification of suppliers of cosmetic products and the procedure or notifying new cosmetic products prior to their first placing on the market
- Rules on the Handling of Packaging and Packaging Waste
- Rules on the labelling of cosmetic products
- Rules on landfill waste tipping
- Rules on the management of waste from the production of titanium dioxide
- Rules on the Management of Waste Oils
- Rules on the monitoring of environmental pollution from the production of titanium dioxide
- Rules on Monitoring Seismicity in Regions with Large Dams
- Rules on the quality of liquid fuels
- Rules on the reporting of data on chemicals
- Rules on Waste Incineration
- Rules on Waste Management
- Waters Act

=== Spain ===
- Ley 1989 - 4 de Conservación de los Espacios Naturales y de la flora y fauna silvestres (on the preservation of natural areas and wildlife)
- Ley 1995 - 38 sobre el Derecho de Acceso a la Información en materia de Medio Ambiente (on public access to environmental information)
- Ley 1995 - 5 de Protección de los animales (on the protection of animals)
- Ley 2000 - 5 de saneamiento y depuración de aguas residuales de La Rioja (on water treatment for the autonomous region of La Rioja, provincial law)
- Ley 2003 - 37 del Ruido (on noise)
- Ley 2005 - 1 por la que se regula el régimen del comercio de derechos de emisión de gases de efecto invernadero (on greenhouse gas emissions trading)
- Ley 2006 – 27 por la que se regulan los derechos de acceso a la información, de participación pública y de acceso a la justicia en materia de medio ambiente (on public access to information, public participation and justice related to environmental matters)
- Ley 2007 - 26 de Responsabilidad Medioambiental (on environmental liability)
- Ley 2007 - 32 para el cuidado de los animales, en su explotación, transporte, experimentación y sacrificio (on animal welfare regarding their breeding, transportation, experimentation and slaughter)
- Ley 2007 - 34 de calidad del aire y protección de la atmósfera (on air quality and the protection of the atmosphere)
- Ley 2010 – 3 por la que se aprueban medidas urgentes para paliar los daños producidos por los incendios forestales y otras catástrofes naturales ocurridos en varias Comunidades Autónomas (approves urgent actions to mitigate impacts due to forest fires and other natural disasters in different Autonomous Regions)
- Ley 2013 – 21 de Evaluación Ambiental (on Environmental Impact Assessment)
- Ley Organica 2007 - 16 complementaria de la Ley para el desarrollo sostenible del medio rural (complements the Law on sustainable development of rural areas)
- Real Decreto Legislativo 2008 - 2 por el que se aprueba el texto refundido de la ley de suelo (consolidated text of the Soil Law)

=== Sweden ===
- Animal Welfare Act (Sweden)
- Animal Welfare Ordinance
- Fishery Conservation Areas Act (SFS 1981:533)
- Forest Act 2004
- Heritage Conservation Act (Sweden) (1988:950)
- Heritage Conservation Ordinance (1988:1188)
- Ordinance concerning Environmentally Hazardous Activities and the Protection of Public Health (1998:899)
- Ordinance on Environmental Quality Standards on Ambient Air (2001:527)
- Ordinance on Land and Water Management (1998:896)
- Plant Protection Ordinance (2006:1010)
- Public Water Areas (Boundaries) Act (SFS 1950:595)
- Radiation Protection Act (1988:220)
- Swedish Environmental Code (1998:808)

=== Switzerland ===
- Bundesgesetz vom 1. Juli 1966 über den Natur- und Heimatschutz (NHG)
- Bundesgesetz vom 20. Juni 1986 über die Jagd und den Schutz wildlebender Säugetiere und Vögel (Jagdgesetz, JSG)
- Bundesgesetz vom 22. Dezember 1916 über die Nutzbarmachung der Wasserkräfte (Wasserrechtsgesetz, WRG)
- Bundesgesetz vom 22. Juni 1877 über die Wasserbaupolizei
- Bundesgesetz vom 24. Januar 1991 über den Schutz der Gewässer (Gewässerschutzgesetz, GSchG)
- Bundesgesetz vom 4. Oktober 1991 über den Wald (Waldgesetz, WaG)
- Bundesgesetz über den Natur- und Heimatschutz
- Chemicals Ordinance (ChemO)
- Chemikaliengebührenverordnung (ChemGebV)
- Chemikalienverordnung (ChemV)
- CO_{2}-Gesetz
- Environmental Protection Act (Switzerland) (EPA)
- Federal Act of 7 October 1983 on the Protection of the Environment (Environmental Protection Act, EPA)
- Federal Act on the Protection of Waters (GSchG)
- Federal Act on Railways Noise Abatement
- Federal Law on the reduction of CO_{2} emissions
- Federal Law relating to Non-human Gene Technology
- Federal Law relating to the Protection of the Environment
- Gentechnikgesetz (GTG)
- Gewässerschutzgesetz (GSchG)
- Gewässerschutzverordnung (GSchV)
- Hydraulic Engineering Act
- Jagdgesetz (JSG)
- Jagdverordnung (JSV)
- Luftreinhalte-Verordnung (LRV)
- Lärmschutz-Verordnung (LSV)
- Nationalparkgesetz
- Natur- und Heimatschutzgesetz (NHG)
- Noise Abatement Ordinance
- Ordinance of 7 November 2007 on Parks of National Importance (Parks Ordinance, ParkO)
- Ordinance on Air Pollution
- Ordinance on Beverage Containers (VGV)
- Ordinance on Environmental Impact Assessment
- Ordinance on Hydraulic Engineering (WBV)
- Ordinance on Plant Protection Products (PSMV)
- Ordinance on Railways Noise Abatement
- Ordinance relating to Impacts on the Soil (VBBo)
- Ordinance relating to Protection from Non-Ionizing Radiation (NISV)
- Ordonnance du 7 décembre 1998 concernant la sécurité des ouvrages d’accumulation (Ordonnance sur les ouvrages d’accumulation, OSOA)
- Ordonnance sur la chasse (OChP)
- Ordonnance sur la protection contre le bruit (OPB)
- Ordonnance sur la protection contre le rayonnement non ionisant (ORNI)
- Ordonnance sur la protection de la nature et du paysage (OPN)
- Ordonnance sur la protection de l’air (OPair)
- Ordonnance sur la protection des eaux (OEaux)
- Ordonnance sur la taxe sur le CO_{2} (Ordonnance sur le CO_{2})
- Ordonnance sur l’aménagement des cours d’eau (OACE)
- Ordonnance sur les atteintes portées aux sols (OSol)
- Ordonnance sur les emballages pour boissons (OEB)
- Ordonnance sur les forêts (OFo)
- Ordonnance sur les produits chimiques (OChim)
- Pflanzenschutzmittelverordnung (PSMV)
- Technical Ordinance on Waste (TVA)
- Umweltschutzgesetz (USG)
- Verordnung vom 12. Februar 1918 über die Berechnung des Wasserzinses (Wasserzinsverordnung, WZV)
- Verordnung vom 2. Februar 2000 über die Nutzbarmachung der Wasserkräfte (Wasserrechtsverordnung, WRV)
- Verordnung vom 25. Oktober 1995 über die Abgeltung von Einbussen bei der Wasserkraftnutzung (VAEW)
- Verordnung über Belastungen des Bodens (VBBo)
- Verordnung über Getränkeverpackungen (VGV)
- Verordnung über den Natur- und Heimatschutz (NHV)
- Verordnung über den Schutz vor nichtionisierender Strahlung (NISV)
- Verordnung über die CO_{2}-Abgabe (CO_{2}-Verordnung)
- Waldgesetz (WaG)
- Waldverordnung (WaV)
- Wasserbaugesetz (WBG)
- Wasserbauverordnung (WBV)
- Water Protection Ordinance (GSchV)

=== Turkey ===
- Law 1946-4922 on the Protection of Life and Property at Sea
- Law 1956-6831 Forest Law
- Law 1964-12 on Water Pollution by Oil
- Law 1982-2634 for the Encouragement of Tourism
- Law 1983-2872 Environment Law

=== United Kingdom ===
- Alkali Act 1863
- Clean Air Act 1956
- Clean Air Act 1968
- Clean Air Act 1993
- Clean Neighbourhoods and Environment Act 2005
- Climate Change Act 2008
- Climate Change and Sustainable Energy Act 2006
- Energy Act 2010
- Environment Act 1995
- Environmental Protection Act 1990
- Flood and Water Management Act 2010
- Forestry Act 1991
- Ground Game Act 1880
- Hunting Act 2004
- Merchant Shipping (Pollution) Act 2006
- Natural Environment and Rural Communities Act 2006
- Planning Act 2008
- Pollution Prevention and Control Act 1999
- Waste Minimisation Act 1998
- Water Act 2003
- Weeds Act 1959

==== Northern Ireland ====
- Game Preservation (Amendment) Act 2002
- Water and Sewerage Services (Amendment) Act 2010

==== Scotland ====
- Climate Change (Scotland) Act 2009
- Marine (Scotland) Act 2010

== North America ==
=== Canada ===
- Arctic Waters Pollution Prevention Act
- Canada Fisheries Act
- Canada Forestry Act
- Canada Shipping Act
- Canada Water Act
- Canada Wildlife Act
- Canadian Environmental Assessment Act, 1992
- Canadian Environmental Protection Act, 1999 – main piece of Canadian environmental legislation, focusing on "respecting pollution prevention and the protection of the environment and human health in order to contribute to sustainable development."
- Department of the Environment Act
- Hazardous Products Act (Canada)
- Migratory Birds Convention Act
- National Parks Act (Canada)
- Natural Heritage Conservation Act (Canada)
- Navigable Waters Protection Act
- Pest Control Products Act (Canada)
- Rocky Mountains Park Act
- Species at Risk Act
- Transportation of Dangerous Goods Act, 1992

==== Alberta ====
- Climate Change and Emissions Management Amendment Act
- Environmental Protection and Enhancement Act (Alberta)
- Fisheries Act (Alberta)
- Forest Act (Alberta)
- Water Act (Alberta)
- Wildlife Act (Alberta)

==== British Columbia ====
- Environmental Management Act (British Columbia)
- Forest Act (British Columbia)
- Water Act (British Columbia)
- Water Protection Act (British Columbia)
- Wildlife Act (British Columbia)

==== Manitoba ====
- East Side Traditional Lands Planning and Special Protected Areas Act (Manitoba)
- Ecological Reserves Act (Manitoba)
- Environment Act (Manitoba)
- Forest Act (Manitoba)
- Provincial Parks Act (Manitoba)
- Water Protection Act (Manitoba)
- Water Rights Act (Manitoba)
- Wildlife Act (Manitoba)

==== New Brunswick ====
- Clean Water Act (New Brunswick)
- Heritage Conservation Act (New Brunswick)

==== Newfoundland ====
- Environment Act (Newfoundland)
- Environmental Assessment Act (Newfoundland)
- Environmental Protection Act (Newfoundland)
- Forestry Act (Newfoundland)
- Water Resources Act (Newfoundland)

==== Northwest Territories ====
- Environmental Protection Act (Northwest Territories)
- Forest Management Act (Northwest Territories)
- Forest Protection Act (Northwest Territories)
- Water Resources Agreements Act (Northwest Territories)

==== Northern Territories ====
- Waters Act (Northern Territories)
- Wildlife Act (Northern Territories)

==== Nova Scotia ====
- Environment Act (Nova Scotia)
- Environmental Goals and Sustainable Prosperity Act (Nova Scotia)
- Forests Act (Nova Scotia)
- Water Resources Protection Act (Nova Scotia)
- Wildlife Act (Nova Scotia)
- Special Places Protection Act (Nova Scotia)
- Wilderness Areas Protection Act (Nova Scotia)
- Crown Lands Act (Nova Scotia)
- Parks Development Act (Nova Scotia)
- Water Act (Nova Scotia)
- Beaches Act (Nova Scotia)
- Beaches and Foreshores Act (Nova Scotia)

==== Ontario ====
- Clean Water Act 2005 (Ontario)
- Clean Water Act (Ontario)
- Environmental Assessment Act (Ontario)
- Environmental Bill of Rights
- Environmental Protection Act (Ontario)
- Forestry Act (Ontario)
- Green Energy Act (Ontario)
- Nutrient Management Act (Ontario)
- Ontario Water Resources Act
- Pesticides Act (Ontario)
- Safe Drinking Water Act
- Toxics Reduction Act (Ontario)
- Waste Management Act 1992 (Ontario)

==== Prince Edward Island ====
- Environment Tax Act (Prince Edward Island)
- Environmental Protection Act (Prince Edward Island)
- Forest Management Act (Prince Edward Island)
- Water and Sewerage Act (Prince Edward Island)
- Wildlife Conservation Act (Prince Edward Island)

==== Quebec ====
- Environment Quality Act (Quebec)
- Forest Act (Quebec)

==== Saskatchewan ====
- Environmental Assessment Act (Saskatchewan)
- Fisheries Act (Saskatchewan)
- Wildlife Act (Saskatchewan)

==== Yukon ====
- Environment Act (Yukon)
- Environmental Assessment Act (Yukon)
- Waters Act (Yukon)
- Wildlife Act (Yukon)

=== Mexico ===
- Ley Ambiental del Distrito Federal – Environmental Law of the Federal District
- Ley de Agua del Estado de Sonora – Water Act of the State of Sonora
- Ley de Aguas del Distrito Federal – Water Law of the Federal District
- Ley de Aguas Nacionales – National Water Law
- Ley de Bioseguridad de Organismos Genéticamente Modificados – Law on Biosafety of Genetically Modified Organisms
- Ley de Pesca – Fisheries Act
- Ley Federal de Turismo – Federal Tourism Law
- Ley Federal del Mar – Federal Law of the Sea
- Ley Forestal – Forestry Law
- Ley General de Bienes Nacionales – General Law of National Assets
- Ley General de Vida Silvestre – General Wildlife Act
- Ley General del Equilibrio Ecológico y la Protección al Ambient – General Law of Ecological Equilibrium and Protection Ambient

== South America ==
=== Bolivia ===
- Law of the Rights of Mother Earth

=== Brazil ===
- Lei Nº 6.938/81 – Lei da Política Nacional do Meio Ambiente, de 31 de agosto de 1981, que trata da Política Nacional do Meio Ambiente, seus fins e mecanismos de formulação e aplicação.
- Lei Nº 7.347/85 – Lei da Ação Civil Pública, de 24 de julho de 1985, que trata da ação civil pública de responsabilidade por danos causados ao meio ambiente, ao consumidor, a bens e direitos de valor artístico, estético, histórico e turístico.
- Lei Nº 9.605/98 – Lei de Crimes Ambientais, de 12 de fevereiro de 1998, que trata das sanções penais e administrativas derivadas de condutas e atividades lesivas ao meio ambiente.

LEI N° 5.197, DE 3 DE JANEIRO DE 1967

- "L5197". Archived from the original on 8 June 2001.

=== Chile ===
- Ley Nº 19.300 – Ley sobre bases generales del medio ambiente (9 de Marzo de 1994).
- Ley N°20.417 – Ley orgánica del Ministerio del Medio Ambiente, Servicio de Evaluación Ambiental y la Superintendencia del Medio Ambiente (12 de enero del 2010).
- Ley N° 20.600 – Ley sobre tribunales ambientales (18 de junio de 2012).
- Ley N° 21.600 – Ley orgánica del Servicio de Biodiversidad y Áreas Protegidas y del Sistema Nacional de Áreas Protegidas (21 de agosto del 2023).
- Ley N° 21.455 – Ley marco de Cambio Climático (30 de mayo del 2022).

== Oceania ==
=== Australia ===
- Biological Control Act 1984
- Clean Energy Act 2011 (repealed in 2014)
- Commonwealth Radioactive Waste Management Act 2005
- Environmental Protection Act 1994
- Environment Protection and Biodiversity Conservation Act 1999 – centerpiece environmental legislation in Australia
- Environment Protection (Sea Dumping) Act 1981
- Great Barrier Reef Marine Park Act 1975
- Hazardous Waste (Regulation of Exports and Imports) Act 1989
- National Environment Protection Council Act 1994
- National Greenhouse and Energy Reporting Act 2007
- Ozone Protection Act 1989
- Product Stewardship Act 2011
- Water Act 2007
- Wildlife Protection (Regulation of Exports and Imports) Act 1982
- World Heritage Properties Conservation Act 1983

==== New South Wales ====
- Environmental Planning and Assessment Act 1979
- Forestry Act 1916 No 55 (New South Wales)

==== Northern Territory ====
- Darwin Waterfront Corporation Act 2006

==== Queensland ====
- Forestry Act 1959 (Queensland)
- Nature Conservation Act 1992
- Nuclear Facilities Prohibition Act 2007 (Queensland)
- Water Act 2000 (Queensland)

==== South Australia ====
- Environment Protection Act 1993
- Forestry Act 1950 (South Australia)
- Water Resources Act 1997 (South Australia)
- Wilderness Protection Act 1992 (South Australia)

==== Tasmania ====
- Environmental Management and Pollution Control Act 1994 (Tasmania)
- Forestry Act 1920 (Tasmania)
- Living Marine Resources Management Act 1995 (Tasmania)
- Threatened Species Protection Act 1995
- Water Management Act 1999 (Tasmania)
- Wildlife Regulations 1999 (Tasmania)

==== Victoria ====
- Environment Protection Act 1970
- Environment Protection Act 2017
- Environment Protection (Amendment) Act 2006 (Victoria)
- Flora and Fauna Guarantee Act 1988
- Pollution of Waters by Oils and Noxious Substances Act 1986
- Sustainable Forests (Timber) Act 2004
- Water Act 1989 (Victoria)
- Water (Governance) Act 2006 (Victoria)
- Water (Resource Management) Act 2005 (Victoria)
- Wildlife Act 1975

==== Western Australia ====
- Environmental Protection Act 1986 (EP Act)
- Environmental Protection (Controlled Waste) Regulations 2004
- Environmental Protection (Noise) Regulations 1997
- Environmental Protection (Unauthorised Discharges) Regulations 2004
- Health Act 1911
- Rights in Water and Irrigation Act
- Biodiversity Conservation Act
- Contaminated Sites Act

=== New Zealand ===
- Clean Air Act 1972
- Climate Change (Forestry Sector) Regulations 2008 (SR 2008/355)
- Climate Change Response Act 2002
- Conservation Act 1987
- Environment Act 1986
- Forest and Rural Fires Regulations 2005 (SR 2005/153) (as of 6 November 2008)
- Forests Act 1949
- Hazardous Substances and New Organisms Act 1996
- Litter Amendment Act 2006
- Marine Reserves Act 1971
- National Parks Act 1980
- New Zealand Nuclear Free Zone, Disarmament, and Arms Control Act 1987
- Ozone Layer Protection Act 1996
- Reserves Act 1977
- Resource Management Act 1991 – primary environmental legislation, outlining the government's strategy of managing the "environment, including air, water soil, biodiversity, the coastal environment, noise, subdivision, and land use planning in general"
- Resource Management Amendment Act 2005
- Scenery Preservation Act 1903
- Soil Conservation and Rivers Control Act 1941
- Waste Minimisation Act 2008 – No 89 Public Act
- Wildlife Act 1953
