= List of Biodiversity Heritage Sites of India =

Type of protected area in India

Biodiversity Heritage Sites (BHS) are notified areas of biodiversity importance in India.

The Indian State Government can notify the Biodiversity Heritage Sites in consultation with local governing bodies under Section 37 of Biological Diversity Act of 2002. These areas are considered unique and fragile ecosystems. They can be either terrestrial, coastal and inland waters or marine ecosystems.

National Biodiversity Authority is a relevant statutory body.

== Arunachal Pradesh ==
No.	Name of the Site	State	District	Taluka	Locality	Area	Importance	Reference
1	Thungeey Gonpu (Kamcho Yaam)	Arunachal Pradesh	West Kameng		Shergaon	6.27 ha (0.0627 km^{2})	Archaeological site and Buddhist mud temple with forest having flowering trees and wild animals	
2	Lyago	Arunachal Pradesh	Lower Subansiri		Hong Nitii	1.24 ha (0.0124 km^{2})	Sacred grove	

== Assam ==
No.	Name of the Site	State	District	Taluka	Locality	Area	Importance	Reference
1	Majuli	Assam	Majuli			87,500 ha (875 km^{2})	A river island in the Brahmaputra river with ecological and cultural importance.	
2	Hajong Tortoise Lake	Assam	Dima Hasao			526.78 ha (5.2678 km^{2})	A lake having critically endangered turtle species as well as other flora and fauna.	
3	Borjuli Wild Rice Site	Assam	Sonitpur			0.41 ha (0.0041 km^{2})	One of the most studied wild species of rice, Oryza rufipogon, is found here.	

== Goa ==
No.	Name of the Site	State	District	Taluka	Locality	Area	Importance	Reference
1	Purvatali Rai	Goa	North Goa	Bicholim	Surla	0.73 ha (0.0073 km^{2})	Sacred Grove	

== Gujarat ==
List of Biodiversity Heritage Sites in Gujarat
No.	Name of the Site	State	District	Taluka	Locality	Area	Importance	Reference
1	Inland Mangrove of Guneri	Gujarat	Kutch	Lakhpat	Guneri	32.78 ha (0.3278 km^{2})	Rare inland mangroves. Chinkara, migratory birds and ratel.	
2	Indigenous mango forest (proposed)	Gujarat	Dang		Chinchli	2,357 ha (23.57 km^{2})	2708 mango trees. Biodiversity hotspot.	

== Himachal Pradesh ==
No.	Name of the Site	State	District	Taluka	Locality	Area	Importance	Reference
1	Sacred grove at Sural Bhatori Monastery	Himachal Pradesh	Chamba	Pangi	Sural	0.60 ha (0.0060 km^{2})	A patch of Betula utilis or Bhojpatra trees with some interspersed Willow trees. Dominant shrubs and herbs: Rosa species, Lonicera species, Sorbus species, Agropyron longearistatum, Festuca species, Primula denticulata, Polygonatum verticillatum, Plantago asiatica, Heracleum candicans, Berberis species, Artemisia species, Bunium persicum etc. Major faunal species, in the surrounding area: Snow Leopard, Brown Bear, Tibetan Wolf, Ibex etc.	
2	High altitude meadow at Muhal Dhar Shinkal	Himachal Pradesh	Chamba	Pangi	Hudan Bhatori	8.74 ha (0.0874 km^{2})	Cotoneaster species, Lonicera species, Sorbus species, Brachypodium sylvaticum, Bromusasper, Festuca species, Poa species, Primula denticulata, Picrorhiza kurroa, Anemone species, Iris species, Artemisia species, Lonicera species, Bunium persicum, Jurinea macrocephala etc. Important floral species recorded in the area: Picrorhiza kurroa, Dactylorhiza hatagirea, Aconitum heterophyllum, Podophyllum hexandrum and Saussurea costus (cultivated). Major faunal species, in the region: Snow Leopard, Brown Bear, Black Bear, Tibetan Wolf, Himalayan Marmot, Ibex and Royle’s Pika	
3	Birch-pine forest patch at Nain Gahar	Himachal Pradesh	Lahaul and Spiti	Udaipur	Nain Gahar, Mooring	12.22 ha (0.1222 km^{2})	Main trees are Himalayan Birch (Betula utilis) and Blue Pine (Pinus wallichiiana). A few middle aged trees of West Himalayan Spruce (Picea smithiana), Deodar (Cedrus deodara) and Juniper (Juniperus species) are interspersed in the proposed patch. Besides, Willow (Salix species) and Sea Buckthorn (Hippophae salicifolia) are also present in the site. The proposed site also includes a very good patch of grassy area, which supports a very good population of important medicinal and aromatic plants like Picrorhiza kurroa, Dactylorhiza hatagirea, Aconitum heterophyllum, Podophyllum hexandrum, Aconitum violaceum, Bunium persicum, Hippophae rhamnoides etc. Indirect evidence indicate the presence of important faunal species like Snow Leopard, Himalayan Brown Bear, Asiatic Black Bear, Himalayan Red Fox, Asiatic Ibex, Himalayan Musk Deer and Royle’s Pika in suitable season of the year. Threatened bird species, the Himalayan Griffon (Gyps himalayensis) and Bearded Vulture (Gypaetus barbatus) have also been reported from the area. According to Trevor, 2019 (unpublished), Nain Gahar’s birch forest patch appears to be a point of meeting of Kashmir elements and Himalayan elements of avifaunal species, with at least two bird species forming hybrid zones there, namely, Greenish Warbler (Phylloscopus trochiloides viridanus and Phylloscopus trochiloides plumbeitarsus) an important ring species, and Variegated Laughing Thrush (Trochalopteron variegatum).	

== Jharkhand ==
No.	Name of the Site	State	District	Taluka	Locality	Area	Importance	Reference
1	Canary Pahad	Jharkhand	Hazaribagh			2,120.67 ha (21.2067 km^{2})	Hill forest with many endangered species	

== Karnataka ==
List of Biodiversity Heritage Sites in Karnataka
No.	Name of the Site	State	District	Taluka	Locality	Area	Importance	Reference
1	Nallur Tamarind Grove	Karnataka	Bengaluru	Devanahalli		21.85 ha (0.2185 km^{2})	Believed as a surviving historical site from the Chola dynasty period. Visually impressive and has about 300 trees. Large and old trees.	
2	Hogrekan	Karnataka	Chikmagalur	Kaduru	Balliganuru	1,015 ha (10.15 km^{2})	Having Shola vegetation and grassland. Many floral species with medicinal value. Moderately wooded land. Dry deciduous type vegetation. connects Kudremukha, Bababudanagiri and Kemmangundi with Bhadra Wildlife Sanctuary and Yemmedode Tiger Sanctuary.	
3	University of Agricultural Sciences, GKVK Campus	Karnataka	Bengaluru	Bengaluru	Bengaluru	167 ha (1.67 km^{2})	13 species of mammals, 10 species of reptiles, 165 of birds and 530 of plants are there in the campus.	
4	Ambaragudda	Karnataka	Shimoga			3,857.12 ha (38.5712 km^{2})	A revenue land located between Sharavathi and Someshwara wildlife sanctuaries. Has Shola vegetation and grasslands.	
5	Mundigekere lake	Karnataka	Uttara Kannada	Sirsi	Sonda		Bird sanctuary	
6	Zooribetta	Karnataka		Koppal				
7	Siddarabetta	Karnataka		Tumakuru				
8	Ramanagara hill	Karnataka						
9	Chikkamagalur hill	Karnataka						
10	Antaragange Betta	Karnataka	Kolar	Kolar	Kolar		perennial water source	
11	Aadi Narayana Swamy Betta	Karnataka	Chikkaballapura	Gudibande	Chikkaballapur		dry-belt species protected by local people	
12	Mahima Ranga Betta	Karnataka	Bengaluru	Bengaluru	Bengaluru		Prominent green space of Bengaluru	
13	Urumbi	Karnataka	Dakshina Kannada	Kadaba	Urumbi		Unique environmental system on the banks of Kumaradhara river	
14	Sri Siddeshwara Swamiji BHS	Karnataka	Vijayapura	Vijayapura	Mamadapura	1,494.38 ha (14.9438 km^{2})	deciduous and dry deciduous forest site named after a spiritual teacher. Hosts several wild animals.	

== Kerala ==
List of Biodiversity Heritage Sites in Kerala
No.	Name of the Site	State	District	Taluka	Locality	Area	Importance	Reference
1	Pannivelichira	Kerala	Pathanamthitta		Mallappuzhassery	62 acres (0.25 km^{2})	Migratory and endemic birds. Water dyke used for irrigation. Wetland ecosystem.	
2	Asramam	Kerala	Kollam			57.53 ha (0.5753 km^{2})	190 years old British Residency, rare varieties of mangrove spread on residency complex and the creek of Ashtamudi Lake.	
3	Cashew tree at the Nombizhi LP School	Kerala	Pathanamthitta		Pandalam Thekkerkara		200-years old cashew nut tree in Ward 5	
4	Pathiramanal	Kerala	Alappuzha		Muhamma		Island in Vembanad lake. Has 4 species of fresh water mangroves, 160 species of flowering and 9 of ferns. 5 species of mammals, 18 of amphibians, 12 of reptiles, 89 of birds, 106 of butterflies, 72 types of small plants, 13 of creepers are found. 120 species of water.	
5	Pandalam trees	Kerala	Pathanamthitta		Pandalam municipality		16 trees (heronries) in town	
6	Chempaka trees in Ward 2	Kerala	Thiruvananthapuram		Anchuthengu		Two Chempaka trees (250 years old)	
7	Nattumavu tree	Kerala	Thiruvananthapuram		Chirayinkeezhu		150 years old tree in Ward 5	
8	Kadalkandam and Poovanam	Kerala	Thiruvananthapuram		Mudakkal		a wetland and a two hundred-year-old tree	
9	Nattumavu tree	Kerala	Kottayam		Ayarkunnam		200 years old tree	
10	Eeyyabharanithuruthu	Kerala	Kannur		Alakkode		island in the Kuppampuzha with biodiversity	
11	Arattuchira	Kerala	Pathanamthitta		Pallikkal		wetland ecosystem	
12	Thudiyurulippara hill	Kerala	Pathanamthitta		Pramadom	17.98 acres and 7.6 acres	Hill	

== Madhya Pradesh ==
List of Biodiversity Heritage Sites in Madhya Pradesh
No.	Name of the Site	State	District	Taluka	Locality	Area	Importance	Reference
1	Naro Hills	Madhya Pradesh	Satna			200 ha (2.0 km^{2})	Geologically unique and diverse. Has large number of species of flora and fauna.	
2	Patalkot	Madhya Pradesh	Chhindwara	Tamia		8,367.49 ha (83.6749 km^{2})	1700-feet deep valley. About 6 million years -old ecosystem. Rare Bryophyte and Pteridopyte and other species are also found.	
3	Sirpur Lake	Madhya Pradesh	Indore	Indore	Indore	260 ha (2.6 km^{2})	Ramsar site with migratory birds. 130 bird species, 14 reptile species, 34 butterfly species	
4	Amarkantak	Madhya Pradesh	Anuppur			7,681.50 ha (76.8150 km^{2})	Located on the Maikal mountain range which connects the Vindhyachal and Satpura mountain ranges	
5	WALMI Hills	Madhya Pradesh	Bhopal			98.79 ha (0.9879 km^{2})	Located on the bank of Kaliyasot Dam, WALMI campus is ecologically important site with 151 faunal species which includes 29 reptiles, 7 Amphibians, 14 Squamata, 13 Mammals 71 Avifauna and 15 Butterfly species. It also has 173 plant species including 53 medicinal and 8 rare species.	

== Maharashtra ==
List of Biodiversity Heritage Sites in Maharashtra
No.	Name of the Site	State	District	Taluka	Locality	Area	Importance	Reference
1	Glory of Allapalli	Maharashtra	Gadchiroli		Alapalli	6 ha (0.060 km^{2})	A reserved forest with biological, ethnic and historical importance.	
2	Anjarle and Velas beaches	Maharashtra	Ratnagiri		Anjarle and Velas	0.75 ha (0.0075 km^{2}) and 0.98 ha (0.0098 km^{2})	Nesting sites of Olive Ridley turtles.	
3	Landor Khori forest	Maharashtra	Jalgaon			48.80 ha (0.4880 km^{2})	Natural forest with 190 species of birds and 24 species of mammals	
4	Wardham Park	Maharashtra	Gadchiroli		Sironcha	8 ha (0.080 km^{2})	old plant and dinosaur fossils	
5	Daldalkuhi	Maharashtra	Gondia	Salekasa			Swamp with a variety of ferns.	
6	Shivaji Park	Maharashtra	Jalgaon				Natural forest and presence of migratory birds in the nearby Mehrun lake.	
7	Shistura Hiranyakeshi BHS	Maharashtra	Sindhudurg	Sawantwadi	Amboli	2.11 ha (0.0211 km^{2})	Has endemic fish species (Schistura Hiranyakeshi) and a temple of Parvati where Hiranyakeshi river originates. Conserved by temple community.	
8	Ganeshkhind Garden	Maharashtra			Pune	33.01 ha (0.3301 km^{2})	Botanical garden established in 1873 by G. M. Woodrow of British East India Company. Home to the first mango tree planted by Peshwas.	
9	BambardeMyristica swamps	Maharashtra	Sindhudurg	Dodamarg	Hevale	2.59 ha (0.0259 km^{2})	Fresh water swamp protected as sacred grove. Have myristicaceae flowering plant family.	

== Manipur ==
No.	Name of the Site	State	District	Taluka	Locality	Area	Importance	Reference
1	Dialong Village	Manipur	Tamenglong		Dialong	1,135 ha (11.35 km^{2})	Longku forest and watershed areas of Joulangpang-Khoukao waterfalls. Sacred groves.	

== Meghalaya ==
No.	Name of the Site	State	District	Taluka	Locality	Area	Importance	Reference
1	Khlaw Kur Syiem KmieIng	Meghalaya	Ri-Bhoi	Umling	Dorbar	16.05 ha (0.1605 km^{2})	Natural habitats with biodiversity. Sacred grove having monoliths and religious places.	
2	Mawtneng BHS	Meghalaya	Ri-Bhoi			54.20 ha (0.5420 km^{2})		

== Odisha ==
No.	Name of the Site	State	District	Taluka	Locality	Area	Importance	Reference
1	Mandasaru	Odisha	Kandhamal	Raikia		528 ha (5.28 km^{2})	Mandasaru gorge has 1563 species of fungi, plants, and animals.	
2	Mahendragiri Hill	Odisha	Gajapati			4,250 ha (42.5 km^{2})	A total of 1,358 species of plants including 1,042 species of angiosperms under 122 families, 60 species of pteridophytes, 104 species of bryophytes, 53 species of lichens and 72 species of macro-fungi and 2 species of gymnosperms occurring in the hill ecosystem.	
3	Gandhamardan Hill	Odisha	Balangir, Bargarh			18,963.89 ha (189.6389 km^{2})	Gandhamardan known as the "ayurvedic paradise,". It is home to 1,200 plant species, 500 animal species, and several varieties of trees, shrubs, herbs, and medicinal plant species.	
4	Gupteswar Forest	Odisha	Koraput, Koraput			350 ha (3.5 km^{2})	Koraput forest is present aside of the "Gupteswar Temple,". It is home to 1,200 plant species, 500 animal species, and several varieties of trees, shrubs, herbs, and medicinal plant species.	

== Punjab ==
List of Biodiversity Heritage Sites in Punjab

No.	Name of the Site	State	District	Taluka	Locality	Area	Importance	Reference
1	Kaya Kalp Vriksh (Great Banyan Tree)	Punjab	Fatehgarh Sahib	Khera Mandal	Cholti Kheri	3.5 acres (0.014 km^{2})	300 years old banyan tree	

== Rajasthan ==
List of Biodiversity Heritage Sites in Rajasthan
No.	Name of the Site	State	District	Taluka	Locality	Area	Importance	Reference
1	Akal Wood Fossil Park	Rajasthan	Jaisalmer					
2	Keora-ki-nal	Rajasthan	Udaipur					
3	Ram-kunda	Rajasthan	Udaipur					
4	Nag-pahar	Rajasthan	Ajmer					
5	Chhapoli- Mansa Mata	Rajasthan	Jhunjhunu					

== Sikkim ==
No.	Name of the Site	State	District	Taluka	Locality	Area	Importance	Reference
1	Tungkyong Dho	Sikkim	North Sikkim			0.06 ha (0.00060 km^{2})	Sacred lake	

== Tamil Nadu ==
No.	Name of the Site	State	District	Taluka	Locality	Area	Importance	Reference
1	Arittapatti hillocks , Melur	Tamil Nadu	Madurai			193.22 ha (1.9322 km^{2})	Seven hillocks with several water bodies. Many birds, raptors.	
2	Kasampatty Veera Koil	Tamil Nadu	Dindigul			4.97 ha (0.0497 km^{2})	sacred grove	
3	Elathur Lake	Tamil Nadu	Erode			37.42 ha (0.3742 km^{2})	wintering grounds and breeding grounds for resident and migratory birds	
4	Nagamalai Hillock	Tamil Nadu	Erode			32.22 ha (0.3222 km^{2})	native vegetation with dry deciduous, thorny and scrub forest type with sporadic grassland. 138 plant species, 118 bird species and 94 faunal species .	
5	Vagaikulam (proposed)	Tamil Nadu	Tirunelveli		Vagaikulam		Birds	

== Telangana ==
No.	Name of the Site	State	District	Taluka	Locality	Area	Importance	Reference
1	Ameenpur lake	Telangana	Sangareddy		Ameenpur	229.05 ha (2.2905 km^{2})	300 years old artificial lake with resident and migratory birds	

== Tripura ==
No.	Name of the Site	State	District	Taluka	Locality	Area	Importance	Reference
1	Baramura waterfall	Tripura	Khowai			150 ha (1.5 km^{2})	highest natural waterfall in Tripura	
2	Unakoti	Tripura	Unakoti			40 ha (0.40 km^{2})	Sacred heritage site	
3	Silachari caves	Tripura	Gomati			100 ha (1.0 km^{2})	Only natural cave of Tripura	
4	Debbari or Chabimura	Tripura	Gomati			215 ha (2.15 km^{2})	River forest	
5	Betlingshib & its surroundings	Tripura	North Tripura			350 ha (3.5 km^{2})	Highest peak	

== Uttar Pradesh ==
List of Biodiversity Heritage Sites in Uttar Pradesh
No.	Name of the Site	State	District	Taluka	Locality	Area	Importance	Reference
1	Gharial Rehabilitation Centre	Uttar Pradesh	Lucknow		Kukrail Reserve Forest	10 ha (0.10 km^{2})	A centre for conservation and rehabilitation of Gharial.	
2	Ken Nala, Bhinga Reserve Forest	Uttar Pradesh	Shravasti		Gulra	80 ha (0.80 km^{2})	unique freshwater mangrove	

== West Bengal ==
List of Biodiversity Heritage Sites in West Bengal
No.	Name of the Site	State	District	Taluka	Locality	Area	Importance	Reference
1	Tonglu	West Bengal	Darjeeling			230 ha (2.3 km^{2})	Medicinal plant conservation areas	
2	Dhotrey	West Bengal	Darjeeling			180 ha (1.8 km^{2})	Medicinal plant conservation areas	
3	Chilkigarh Kanak Durga	West Bengal	Jhargram	Chilkigarh	Chilkigarh	22.62 ha (0.2262 km^{2}) (1,969 m (6,460 ft) perimeter)	sacred grove rich in biodiversity	
4	Baneswar Shiva Dighi waterbody	West Bengal	Cooch Behar		Baneswar	0.66 ha (0.0066 km^{2})	Rare Black Softshell Turtle habitat	
5	State Horticulture Research and Development Station	West Bengal	Nadia			39.61 ha (0.3961 km^{2})	indigenous germplasm of horticulture and medicinal plants	
6	Namthing Pokhari	West Bengal	Darjeeling			4.81 ha (0.0481 km^{2})	Habitat for Himalayan Newt	
7	Char Balidanga	West Bengal	Nadia			46.86 ha (0.4686 km^{2})	About 100 species of avifauna	
8	Amkhoi Wood Fossil Park	West Bengal	Birbhum			10 ha (0.10 km^{2})	angiosperm wood fossil	
9	Haldir Char Island	West Bengal	Purba Medinipur			4.73 ha (0.0473 km^{2})	mangrove swamp	
10	Birampur-Baguran Jalpai	West Bengal	Purba Medinipur			95.91 ha (0.9591 km^{2})	Intertidal coastal stretch	
