= Ashramam Biodiversity Heritage Site =

Coordinates: 8°53′44″N 76°35′11″E

Ashramam Biodiversity Heritage Site is the first Biodiversity Heritage Site in the Kerala state that came up at Asramam in Kollam city. This heritage site encompasses more than 50 hectares, including the Government Guest House complex, the mangrove area, and the creek of Ashtamudi Lake.

== Background ==
According to KSSP studies, the Ashramam mangrove region and the associated watershed area are home to 15 species of mangroves, 22 supporting mangrove species, 122 plant species, 34 edible fish species, and 62 bird species. Additionally, over 160 species of rare and endangered plants have been identified in this area. The mangroves in the complex, which included some rare varieties, were preserved and protected by the British. However, during the 1980s, a significant portion of the mangrove forests was destroyed under the guise of a development project. Asramam mangrove spread was habitat to the highly endangered Syzygium travancoricum species of mangrove.
