= National Highway 353B (India) =

Highway in India

National Highway 353B
- Map of National Highway 353B in red

Route information
- Auxiliary route of NH 53
- Length: 141 km (88 mi)

Major junctions
- East end: Ashti
- NH 930D Rajura
- West end: Adilabad

Location
- Country: India
- States: Maharashtra, Telangana

Highway system
- Roads in India; Expressways; National; State; Asian
← NH 353C	→ NH 44

National Highway 353B, or NH-353B is a national highway in India and it passes through Bela, Adilabad district connects with Ashti Maharashtra. It is a spur road of National Highway 53. It traverses the states of Maharashtra and Telangana in India.

== Route ==
Maharashtra

Ashti, Gondpimpri, Rajura, Bamawada, Gadchandur, Vansadi, Korpana to Bela and Adilabad of Telangana border.

Telangana

Maharashtra border - Bela and Adilabad.. It passes through Bela Town and work in underway.

== Junctions ==
NH 353C Terminal near Ashti.
NH 930D Rajura
NH 44 Terminal near Adilabad.passing through Bela Town

== Project development ==
The 56.6 km section from Rajura to Maharashtra border is being widened to 4/6 lane at an estimated cost of ₹ 647.99 crores and From Bela Town to Adilabad section of work currently underway expected to be completed by end of 2026 year.

== See also ==
- List of national highways in India
- List of national highways in India by state
