= Simpson-Roosevelts Asiatic Expedition =

Zoological expedition to Asia

The James Simpson-Roosevelt Asiatic Expedition was a 1925 expedition sponsored by the Field Museum of Natural History and organized by Kermit Roosevelt and his brother Theodore Roosevelt Jr.

== Finance and organization ==
In 1924, the Roosevelts decided they wanted to organize an expedition through Asia for the purposes of scientific achievement. They gained the interest of Field Museum President Stanley Field and Director Davies, who were able to secure funding from science enthusiast James Simpson for their trip focusing on exploring the Pamir, Turkestan and the Tian Shan Mountains [...] The Roosevelts would be the first to procure a collection of wildlife in this region for an American museum. At the end of their journey, they had collected over two thousand specimens of small mammals, birds and reptiles, along with seventy large mammals, including Ovis Poli, the great wild sheep.

James Simpson (1874–1939), a Field Museum trustee who had first been elected to that position in 1921, financed the expedition but remained in Chicago. The expedition's main participants were the two Roosevelt brothers, the naturalist George K. Cherrie, the photographer C. Suydam Cutting, two experienced hunters from Bandipur and several other Hindustani-speaking men who joined the expedition in Srinagar. The Roosevelts secured permission from the Chinese government to cross the Himalayas into Chinese territory.

== Itinerary and results ==
George Cherrie went by freighter with the expedition's equipment, along with four cougar hounds, to Karachi. Theodore and Kermit Roosevelt with Suydam Cutting departed from New York City on 11 April 1925 aboard SS Leviathan. In England they secured, with the help of the Soviet envoy Rakovsky, permission to enter the Russian Pamirs. Stopping in Paris to buy presents for Asians they might encounter, the three Americans went by rail to Marseilles and then by ship to Bombay, arriving on May 11. On May 19 the expedition left Srinagar with a caravan of 60 ponies. Via the Zoji Pass they reached Leh about June 1 and then collected several specimens of the barhal and the Tibetan antelope. For more than 2 weeks, the expedition journeyed through the high Himalayas and lost 14 of their 60 ponies, before reaching Sanju Bazaar in eastern Turkestan on July 5. A few days later the party reached Yarkand, where they split up. Cutting went northwest to Kashgar; Cherrie collected birds, small mammals and reptiles in central Turkestan; the Roosevelts with the two Bandipur shikaris went to the Tian Shan Mountains for big game hunting.

In the Tian Shan range, the Roosevelts shot and collected specimens of Altai wapiti, Tian Shan sheep, Siberian roe deer, Asiatic brown bear, and a comprehensive museum group of Tian Shan ibex. After departing the Tian Shan Mountains, the Roosevelts arrived in Kashgar on September 28 and then in the Russian Pamirs successfully shot and collected a museum group of Marco Polo sheep. The Roosevelts returned to British India via the Khunjerab Pass and arrived in Kashmir on November 3.

Cherrie and Cutting met in the Tian Shan region on September 7.

Further collecting of birds and small mammals was done there and then they returned to Kashgar whence they started home via Russian Turkestan and Constantinople, carrying with them practically the entire collection made by the expedition. This included some 21 skins, skulls and bones of large game, 700 to 1,000 skins of birds and small mammals, and tanks of reptiles or amphibians preserved in alcohol or formaldehyde. They journeyed overland northwest and crossed the Russian border at Irkeshtan, November 6th. Ten days later they reached the railhead at Andijan and there arranged for railway transport of themselves and their collections to Batum on the Black Sea.

Cutting returned directly to the United States and after some difficulty and delays Cherrie managed the successful return of the baggage to the United States.

The Roosevelt brothers met their wives in Srinagar in early November and then after some more shooting and collecting of specimens in British India, the party returned to the United States.

== Discovery and earlier collections ==
On this expedition a new species of skink, Eutropis allapallensis, was discovered; Karl P. Schmidt described the expedition's preserved skink specimen, which was collected in the Allapalli Forest, and named the new species Mabuya allapallensis.

The region in which the expedition worked had previously been visited by several naturalists. The foremost collections are those made in the early seventies of the last century by the two Yarkand Missions under T. D. Forsyth, whose ornithological results were reported upon by Henderson and Hume, Scully, and Sharpe. Other contributions to the ornithology of the Tarim basin are due to Menzbier, Przewalski, and Schalow, while Dr. W. L. Abbott's travels added considerably to our knowledge of the bird-life of the western Himalayas and Eastern Turkestan. In the Tian Shan Mountains, Severtzow, Almásy, and Merzbacher secured extensive collections. Kashmir and Ladak have lately attracted the attention of various ornithologists, among whom Meinertzhagen, Osmaston, and Whistler may particularly be mentioned.
