= National Biodiversity Authority =

Indian statutory autonomous body

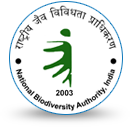
- Abbreviation: NBA
- Formation: 1 October 2003
- Type: Government agency
- Purpose: Implementation of Biological Diversity Act, 2002
- Location: Chennai, India
- Region served: India
- Chairperson: Shri Virendra R Tiwari, IFS (Retd.)
- Parent organisation: Ministry of Environment, Forests, and Climate Change, Government of India
- Website: nbaindia.org

The National Biodiversity Authority (NBA) is a statutory autonomous body under the Ministry of Environment, Forests and Climate Change, Government of India established in 2003 to implement the provisions of the Biological Diversity Act, 2002, after India signed Convention on Biological Diversity (CBD) in 1992.

== Overview ==
Headquartered in Chennai, India, it acts as a facilitating, regulating and advisory body to the Government of India "on issues of conservation, sustainable use of biological resources and fair and equitable sharing of benefits arising out of the use of biological resources." Additionally, it advises State Governments in identifying the areas of biodiversity importance (biodiversity hotspots) as heritage sites.

In 2012, NBA organized the first ever National Biodiversity Congress (NBC), held at Thiruvananthapuram, Kerala. On this occasion, National Biodiversity Students' Congress was also held

Since its establishment, NBA has supported creation of SBBs in 29 States and facilitated establishment of around 1,39,831 BMCs.

The National Biodiversity Authority is mandated to regulate access to biological resources and / or associated knowledge for research, bio-survey and bio-utilization, commercial utilization, obtaining Intellectual Property Rights, transfer of results of research and transfer of accessed biological resources.

The details of application forms for Access and Benefit Sharing (ABS) of specific activities are given in the website of National Biodiversity Authority.

The Moot Court Association of Symbiosis Law School, Nagpur in collaboration with the Maharashtra State Biodiversity Board organized the National Moot Court Competition from December 3–5, 2021. J. Justin Mohan, Secretary, National Biodiversity Authority

== Judgement ==
NGT in its judgement of Chandrabhal singh, has directed all the states to comply with provision of the act and create biodiversity management committee and peoplebiodiversity register in comprehensive manner.

== See also ==
- List of Biodiversity Heritage Sites of India
- The Kerala State Biodiversity Board
- Indian Council of Forestry Research and Education
