= Por River =

Por river
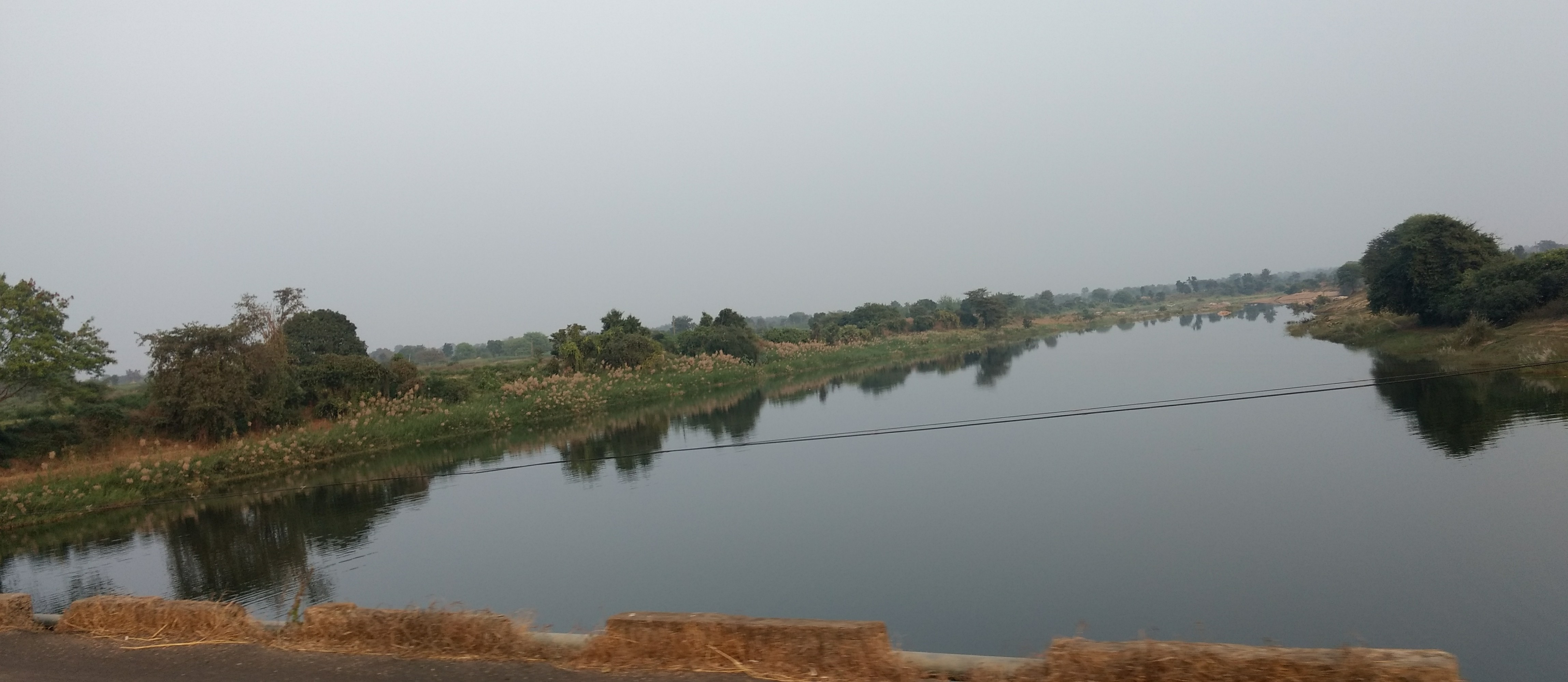
- Por river near Chamorshi
- Native name: पोर नदी (Marathi)

Location
- State: Maharashtra
- District: Gadchiroli

Physical characteristics
- Mouth: Wainganga river
  - coordinates: 19.9718°N 79.9296°E

Basin features
- River system: Godavari basin
- Bridges: Bridge on NH 353C near Chamorshi

Por river (Marathi: पोर नदी) is a minor river in Gadchiroli district of Maharashtra. It is a minor tributary of Wainganga river and falls into it near Chamorshi.
