= Eutropis allapallensis =

Conservation status
- Least Concern (IUCN 3.1)

Scientific classification
- Kingdom: Animalia
- Phylum: Chordata
- Class: Reptilia
- Order: Squamata
- Family: Scincidae
- Genus: Eutropis
- Species: E. allapallensis

Binomial name
- Eutropis allapallensis (Schmidt, 1926)

Synonyms
- Mabuya allapallensis Schmidt, 1926

Species of lizard

Eutropis allapallensis, the Allapalli grass skink or Schmidt's mabuya, is a species of skink endemic to India.

== Distribution ==
Eutropis allapallensis is widely distributed in central and peninsular India. Its type locality is Allapalli Forest near Chanda.

== Habitat ==
This species occurs in tropical dry and moist deciduous and open scrub forests. It can also be found near human habitations and in arable land. It is locally abundant throughout its range.

== Images ==
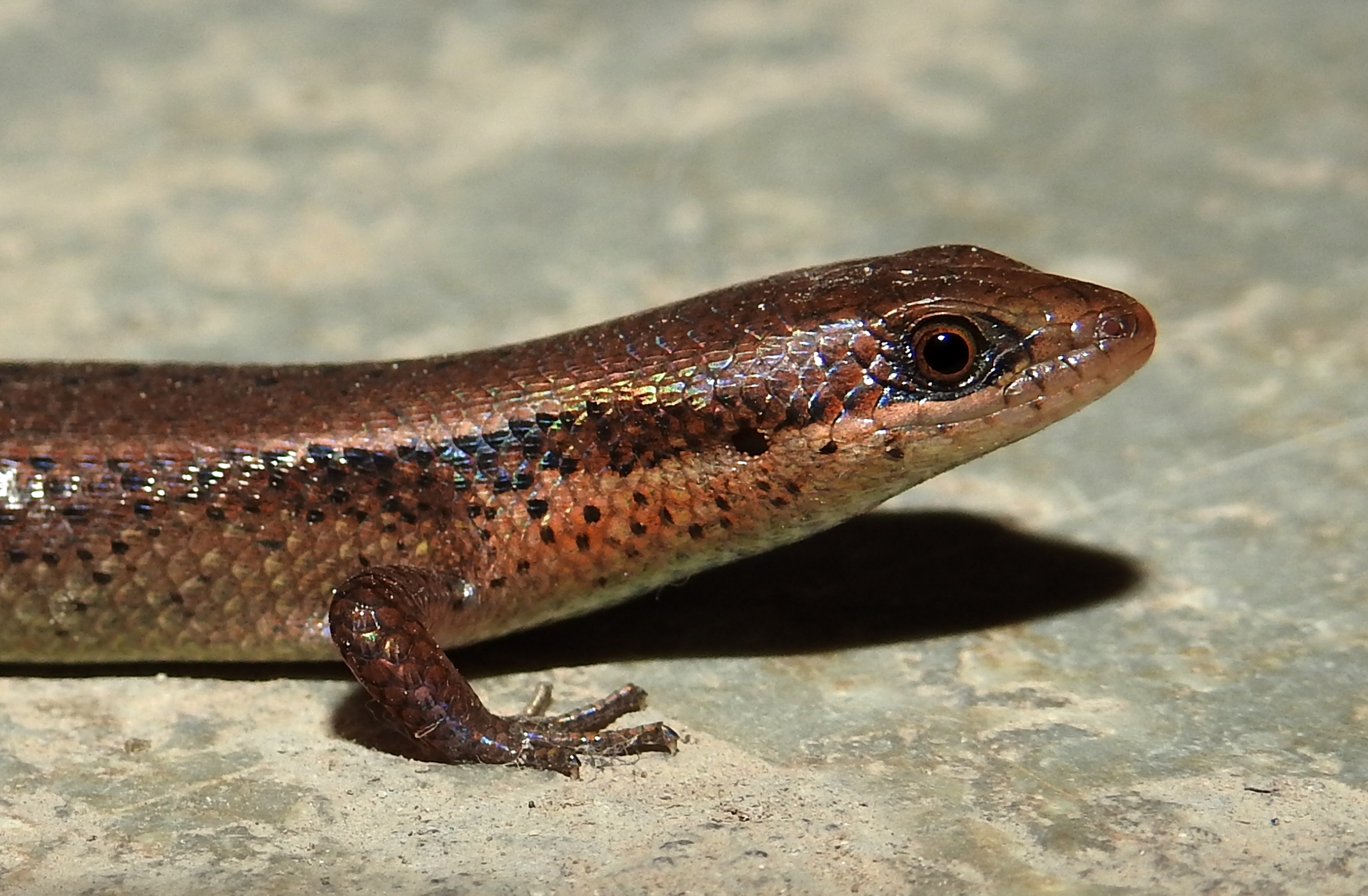
Eutropis allapallensis-Allapalli forest skink

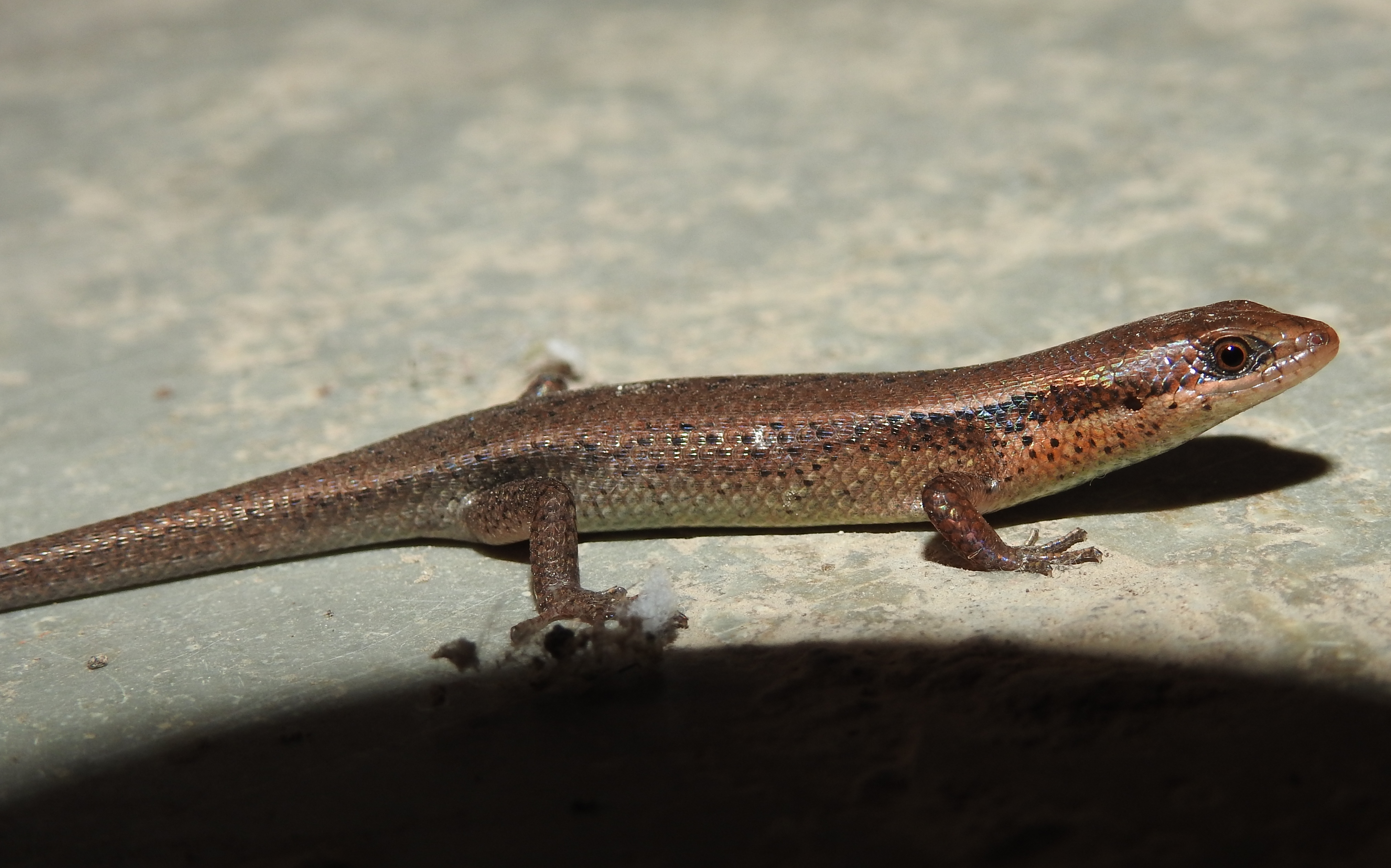
Allapalli forest skink

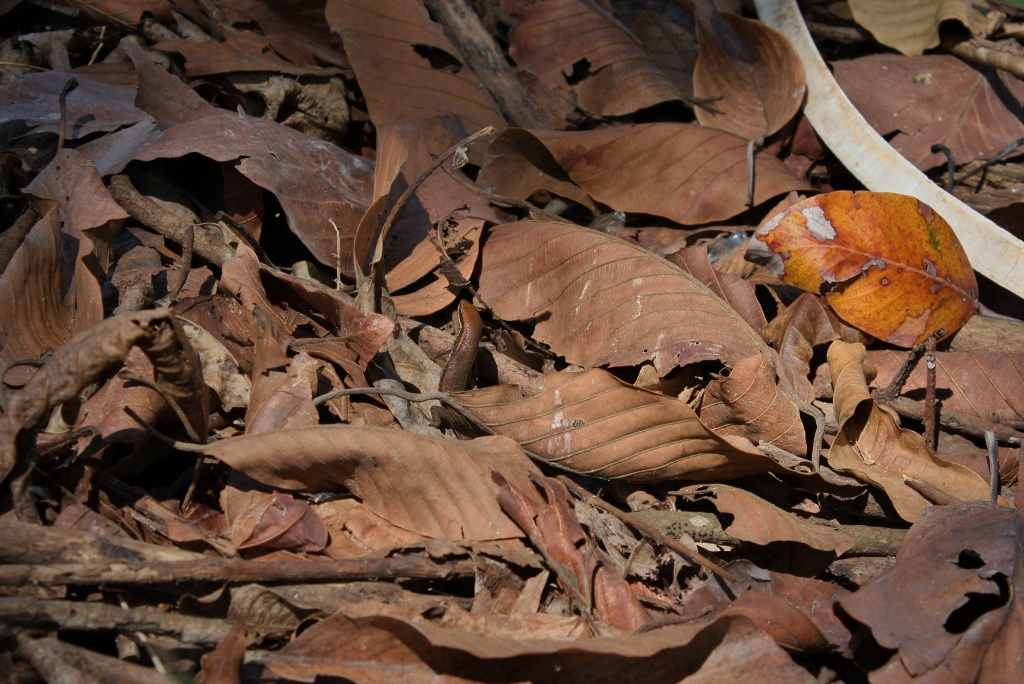
Eutropis allapallensis

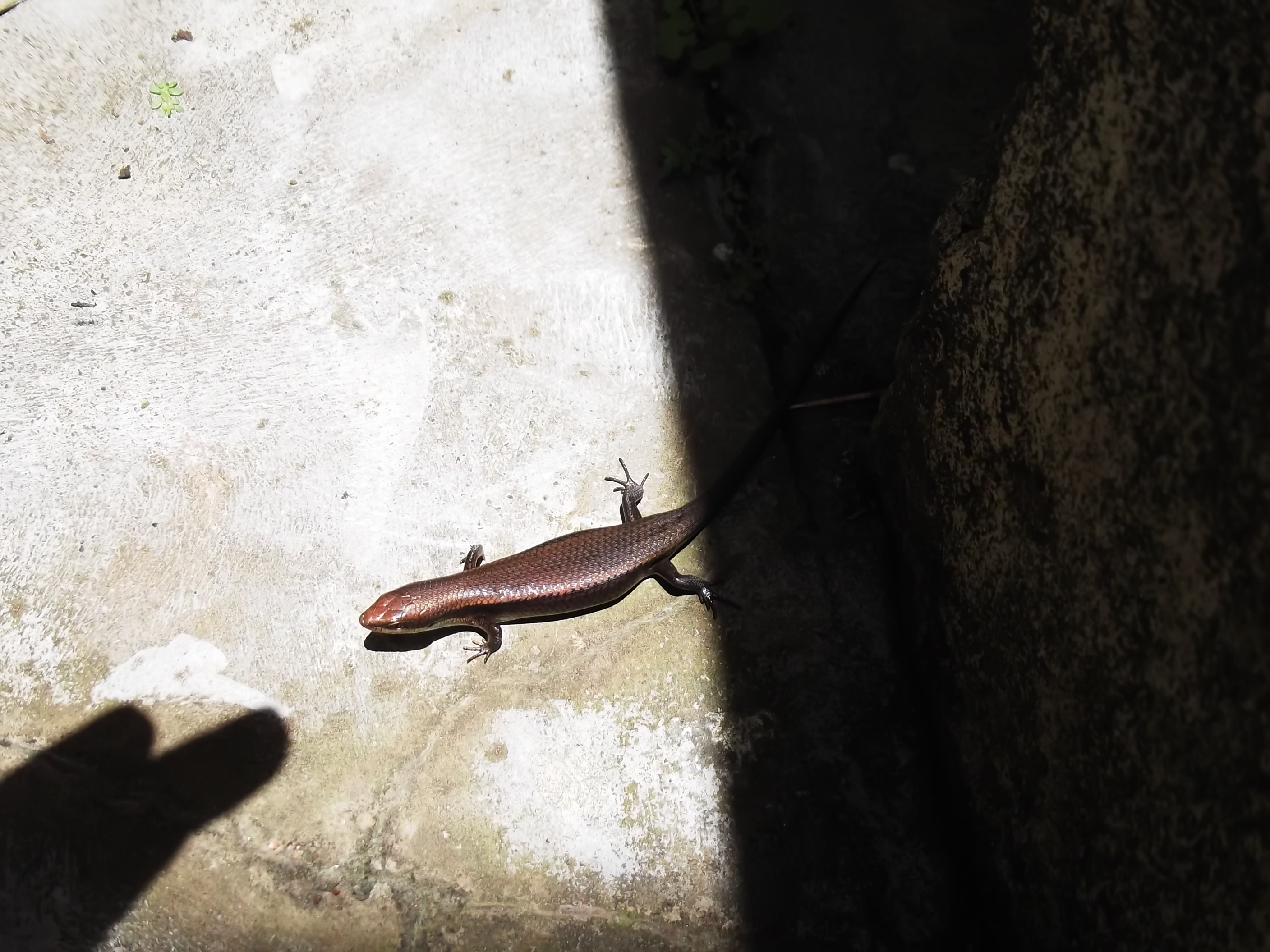
Eutropis allapallensis at Yercaud

== See also ==
- Simpson-Roosevelts Asiatic Expedition
