= National Highway 130D (India) =

National highway in India

National Highway 130D
- Map of the National Highway in red

Route information
- Auxiliary route of NH 30
- Length: 195 km (121 mi)

Major junctions
- East end: Kondagaon
- West end: Allapalli

Location
- Country: India
- States: Maharashtra, Chhattisgarh

Highway system
- Roads in India; Expressways; National; State; Asian
| ← NH 30 | → NH 353C |

National Highway 130D, commonly referred to as NH 130D is an under construction national highway in India. It is a spur road of National Highway 30. NH-130D cuts through the Abujhmarh forest which has been a maoist strong hold. The highway traverses the states of Chhattisgarh and Maharashtra in India.

== Route ==
Chhattisgarh

Kondagaon, Narayanpur, Kutul - Maharashtra Border.

Maharashtra

Chhattisgarh Border - Bingunda, Laheri, Dhodraj, Bhamragard, Hemalkasa, Allapalli.

== Junctions ==
NH 30 Terminal near Kondagaon.
NH 353C Terminal near Allapalli.

== See also ==
- List of national highways in India
- List of national highways in India by state
