= Sakoli Municipal Council =

Type
- Type: Unicameral

History
- Founded: 2016

Leadership
- Municipal Chief Officer: Chief Officer

Structure
- Seats: 17
- Political groups: Government BJP: 11 seats; Opposition; INC: 1 seat NCP: 1 seat Independent: 4 seats

Elections
- Voting system: First pass the post
- Last election: 18 December 2016
- Next election: TBD

Sakoli Municipal Council is a Class-3 municipal local body administrating Sakoli town in Bhandara district of Maharashtra, India.

== History ==
Sakoli constituted as Municipal Council in 2016 by amalgamation of areas under Sakoli and Sendurwafa village councils. The Sakoli town has a population of 14,636 according to the 2011 census.

== Municipal Council Election ==
=== Electoral performance 2016 ===
S.No.	Party name	Party flag or symbol	Number of Corporators
01	Bharatiya Janata Party (BJP)		11
02	Indian National Congress (INC)		1
03	Nationalist Congress Party (NCP)		1
04	Independents		4
