= Markandeshwar =

Shiva temple

Coordinates: 30.1785°N 76.8617°E

The Markandeshwar Mahadev temple is a Shiva temple (not to be confused with 8th century temple Markanda Mahadev, Chamorshi), located in the town of Shahabad Markanda, which is situated in the Kurukshetra district of Haryana in North India. The name Markandeshwar is associated with Maharishi Markandeya, a great devotee of Shiva.

== History ==
The Shahabad Markanda town lies on the banks of the river Markanda river, Haryana, a tributary of the Ghaggar, and a part of the ancient Vedic Saraswati River basin system. The river derives its name from Maharishi Markandeya as well and several ancient ashramas of Rishi Markandeya can be seen along the banks of the river in the neighboring districts.

== Markandeshwar Mahadev Temple ==
The walls of the Markandeshwar Mahadev temple carry a scene depicting Lord Shiva saving Rishi Markandeya from Yamraj, the Hindu God of death.

== Story of Maharishi Markandeya ==
Markandeya was an exemplary son, who was destined to die at the age of 16. He grew up to be a great devotee of Shiva and on the day of his destined death he continued his worship of Shiva in His form of Shivalingam. The messengers of Yama, the God of death were unable to take away his life because of his great devotion and continual worship of Shiva. Finally, Yama came himself to take Markandeya's life away and sprung his noose around the young sage's neck. By mistake, the noose landed around the Shivalingam and out of it, Shiva emerged in all his fury attacking Yama for his act of aggression. After defeating Yama in battle to the point of death, Shiva then revived him, under the condition that the young Markandeya would live forever. Thus, the Maha Mrityunjaya Stotra is attributed to Maharishi Markandeya.

The Markandeya Purana comprises a dialogue between Markandeya and a sage called Jaimini and a number of chapters in the Bhagavata Purana are dedicated to his conversations and prayers. Maharishi Markandeya is also mentioned in the Mahabharata.

== Legend of the temple ==
The Markandeshwar Mahadev temple is supposed to be the place where the young Markandeya was praying to Shiva in order to win over his destiny. This is where Shiva fought with Yama and blessed Maharishi Markandeya with the boon of immortality. The original temple dated back to pre-Mahabharat times and was founded in the third millennium B.C. The current structure is more recent and dates back to the early 20th century.

== Days to visit ==
Pilgrims turn out to visit the Markandeshwar Mahadev temple in large numbers on Sundays and during the month of Shravan, which roughly corresponds to the months of July–August in the Julian calendar. The temple can be reached very easily and it is located 20 kilometers south of Ambala on the Ambala-Delhi section of the famous Grand Trunk Road. A Markundeshwar Mahadev temple also situated near village AJARI, Sirohi road, Sirohi which is 28 km east from Sirohi District and known as one of the oldest temple in the area. 365 days water flowing form the markundeshwar temple. there are three Kund where people also do Pind dan'.
