= National Highway 930D (India) =

National highway in India

National Highway 930D
- Map of the National Highway in red

Route information
- Length: 63 km (39 mi)

Major junctions
- North end: Chandrapur
- South end: Lakkdkot

Location
- Country: India
- States: Maharashtra

Highway system
- Roads in India; Expressways; National; State; Asian
← NH 930	→ NH 930

National Highway 930D, commonly referred to as NH 930D is a national highway in India. It is a spur road of National Highway 930. NH-930D traverses the state of Maharashtra in India.

== Route ==
Chandrapur, Visapur, Ballarpur, Bamni, Rajura, Warur Road, Dewada, Lakkdkot and terminating at Maharashtra / Telangana Border.

== Junctions ==
NH 930 Terminal near Chandrapur.
NH 353B near Bamni.

== See also ==
- List of national highways in India
- List of national highways in India by state
