= Markanda Mahadev, Chamorshi =

Hindu temple complex in Maharashtra, India

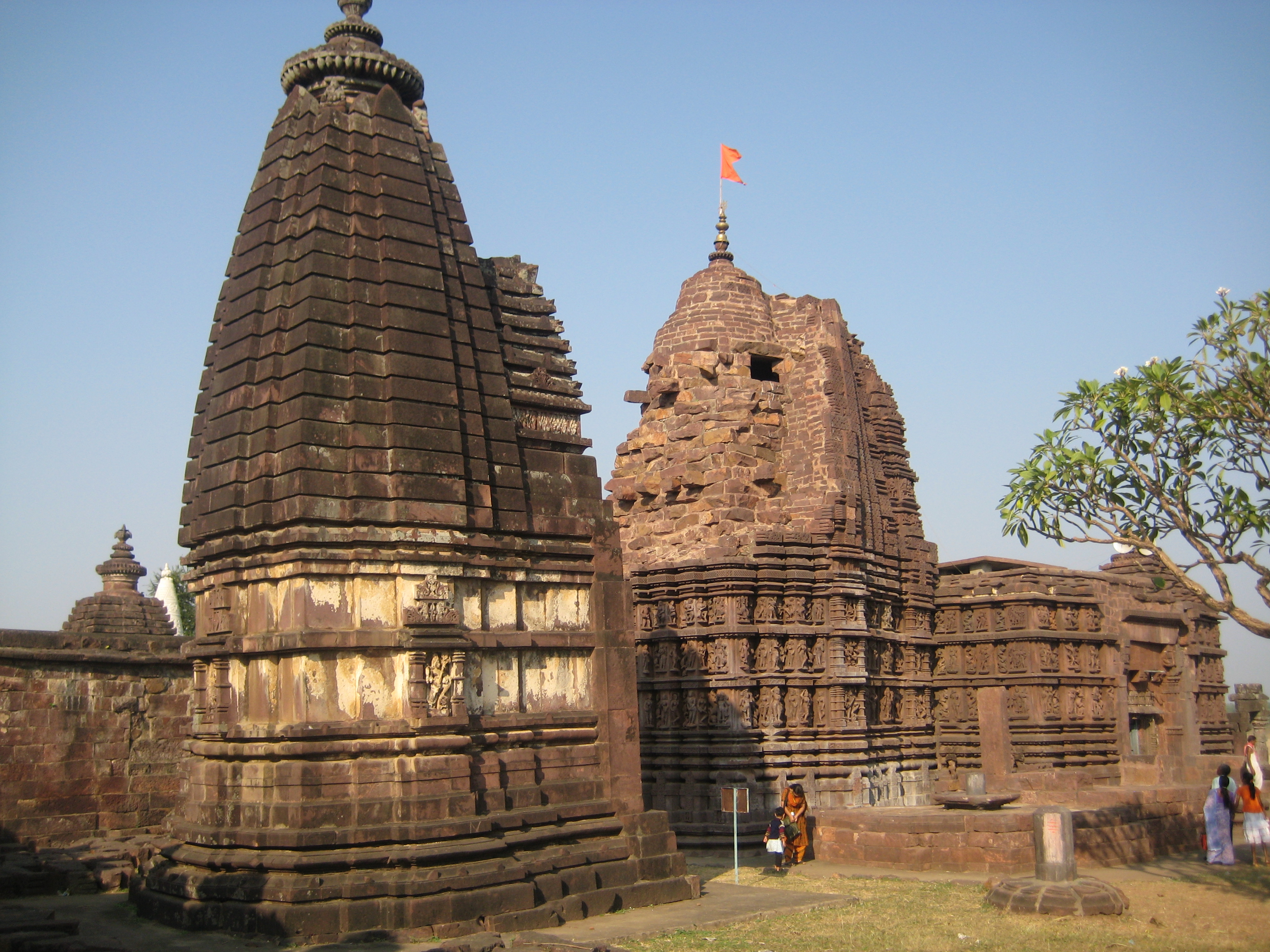
Markandeshwar temple complex on the bank of Vainganga river

Markanda Mahadev Temple Complex is situated at the banks of the Wainganga River near Chamorshi town in the Gadchiroli District of Maharashtra. This 8th Century Temple Complex is called Mini Khajuraho. The nearest village is Marakand Deo.

== Legend ==
This temple complex is dedicated to Lord Shiva. However, the Markanda name is derived from the Markandeya rishi of Haryana who was an ardent devotee of Shiva. He went into penance for years on the banks of Markanda river and finally tried to offer his head to Shiva when Shiva appeared and stopped him. He blessed him with a temple in his name.

== Complex ==
This temple complex is spread over 40 acres of land and many temples are in a dilapidated condition. The construction is attributed to the Rashtrakuta dynasty which there from the 8th to the 12th century.

There are many intricate idols (murtis) on the outer walls of this temple complex.

== Transport ==
Markanda Mahadev can be reached while going from Gadchiroli to Chamorshi, Chandrapur to Chamorshi, after the town Mul, before Chamorshi. Chandrapur to Markanda Mahadev is 67km. Nagpur to Markanda Mahadev temple complex is about 190km. Bussing is available at Chandrapur. The nearest railway station is Chandrapur, which is well connected to Nagpur, Hyderabad, Delhi, Chennai and Visakhapatnam. Near this temple a barrage is under construction named Chichdoh Barrage. It is near Sawali, Chandrapur.
