= Sakoli =

- City
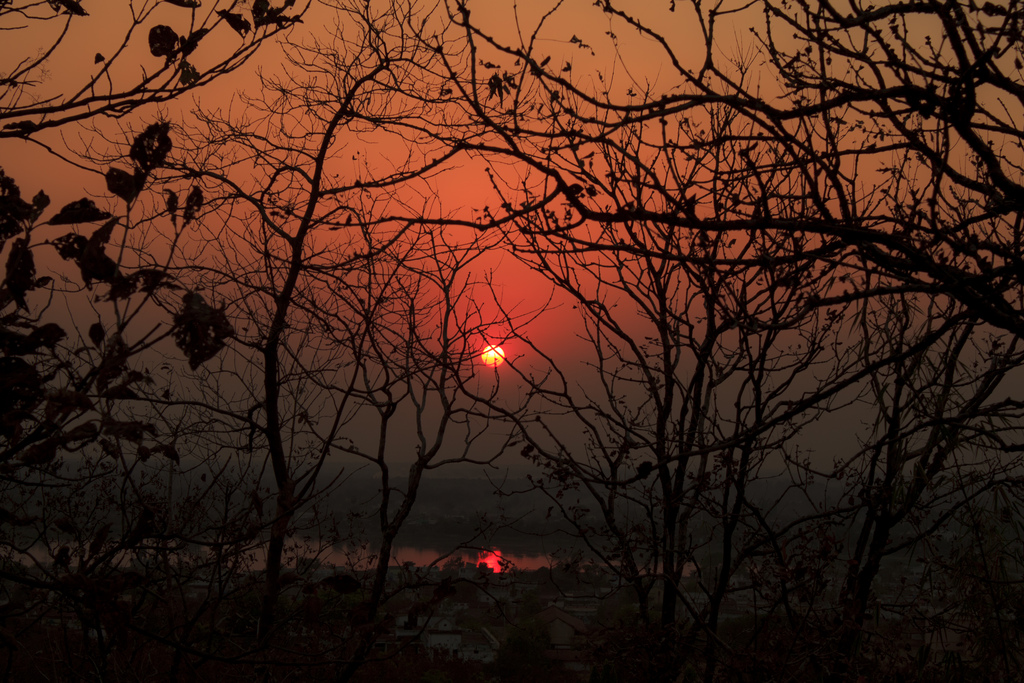
- Sun setting over Sakoli lake
- Sakoli Location in Sakoli Taluka
- Coordinates: 21.08°N 79.98°E
- Country: India
- State: Maharashtra
- District: Bhandara

Government
  - Type: Municipal Council
  - Body: Sakoli Municipal Council

Area
  - Total: 10 km^{2} (3.9 sq mi)

Population (2011)
  - Total: 14,636
  - Density: 1,500/km^{2} (3,800/sq mi)

Languages
  - Official: Marathi
- Time zone: UTC+5:30 (IST)
- Postal code: 441802
- Vehicle registration: MH36 ( Under Bhandara RTO)

Sakoli is a city and a municipal council in Bhandara district in the Indian state of Maharashtra. It is connected with NH-53 and NH-353C. It is one of the fastest growing (beside lakhani ) financial and educational hub features like colleges for Pharmacy, engineering and upcoming BAMS courses.

City holds a weekly bajar on side road every Sunday from 10 to 7.

Sakoli is also famous for nagzira tiger reserve route and one of the gate of nagzira tiger reserve (pitezari gate) have its route from sakoli.

Famous wildlife include - Tiger, black sloth etc.

One of the famous wildlife conservative scientist Shri Maruti bhujangrav chitampalli also visited sakoli to visit nagzira tiger reserve for there study on wild dogs.

== Geography ==
Sakoli (साकोली) is located at 21.08° N ×79.98° E. It has an average elevation of 233 metres (767 feet). It is located on Mumbai-Kolkata National Highway 6. Sakoli is well surrounded by lake, ponds, and hills [of small to medium heights]. Approximately two to three km from the city the Chulbhand river flows. The Gondumari Palace is just 10 km away from the city. It is of historical importance due to the presence of zamindari kingdom—memorials of them can still be found today. Two important tourist points, viz., Nagzira National Park and Navegaon Bandh Bird Sanctuary are very close to the city, making it as visitors' the only convenient place.

== Transport ==
Sakoli is well connected to the major and minor cities. It lies along National Highway 6, which mainly connects Mumbai and Kolkata (via Nagpur, Raipur). Other cities like Gondia, Gadchiroli, Chandrapur etc., are also well-connected through roads and/or rails. Soundad (10 km) & Gondia Junction(60 km) and Nagpur Junction (105 km) are the nearest major railway stations. Another railways station of importance is Saundad (convenient place to go by train to Gondia and Chandrapur). The nearest airport is Nagpur International Airport (120 km)

== Education ==
The city has good education facilities ranging from kindergarten to university degrees. This city has several schools (Marathi and English), high schools (five Marathi, one English), and one government polytechnic college. Many other degree colleges including, B.Pharm., B.Tech., B.A, M.A, B.Sc., M.SC, B-com, M-com, D.Ed., D.Pharm., physical educational institute, nursing institutes, etc. Sakoli is well known in the Bhandara District for the quality education.

== Culture ==
People of many religions can be found at Sakoli. Few temples of Lord Durga, Lord Ganesha, Buddha Vihar, mosque can be found in the city. The religious festivals, such as—to name few, Gudi Padva, Bouddha-pournima, Rama Navami, Hanuman Jayanti, Dr. Ambedkar Jayanti, Ashadhi and Kartiki Ekadashis, Gokulashtami, Poda, Ganesh Chaturthi, Durga Puja, Saraswati Puja, Gauripujan, Dasara, Divali, Holi, Muharram, Ramzan Id and Bakr-Id, and few fairs are observed.

Year	Male	Female	Total Population	Change	Religion (%)							
Year	Male	Female	Total Population	Change	Hindu	Muslim	Christian	Sikhs	Buddhist	Jain	Other religions and persuasions	Religion not stated
2011	7392	7244	14636	-	72.991	7.188	0.178	0.137	18.776	0.191	0.417	0.123
