= Kaya Kalp Vriksh =

Biodiversity heritage site in Fatehgarh Sahib, Punjab

Kaya Kalp Vriksh or Great Banyan Tree is a Biodiversity Heritage Site in Fatehgarh Sahib, Punjab, India. It became the first biodiversity heritage site of the state on 16 December 2021. The tree spans over 3.5 acres of land and is about 300 years old. For the conservation and management of the site Punjab Biodiversity Board (PBB) confirmed the scheme under Section 37 of the Biological Diversity Act (BDA), 2002, and also list it as a Biodiversity Heritage Site (BHS).

The surrounding area has a diverse variety of plants and animals which include birds like peacocks, owls, many species of reptiles like snake, monitor lizards, garden lizards, insects, arthropods, millipedes, nematodes. Plant division like bryophytes. Fungi, algae, lichens, epiphytes are also present in abundance and different varieties. There is also a documentary made about the tree which was shown as a part of a TV series by a Paris-based production house Camera Lucida. The documentary is 'Tree Stories: Most Remarkable Trees of the World'.

The tree also has a local lore behind it, from Sirhind side on the Sher Shah Suri Marg a left turn from the Marg beside Sarai Banjara Village, from there it is about 8 km or a link road from interior has to be taken for reaching the site of the tree. The lore is that no-one until now has been able to stop the indefinite growth of the tree. It is said that whoever in the past tried to stop the growth of the tree has had mishaps and bad luck. The foliage and timber of the tree are also considered to be antagonistic. As the tree stands between private owned lands, the surrounding land owners also do not have the courage cut any part of the tree which may grow in and spread on their land.
