= Armori Municipal Council =

Type
- Type: Municipal Council of the Armori

History
- Founded: 12 September 2017

Leadership
- Mayor: Rupesh punekar, BJP
- Seats: 17

Elections
- Last election: 28-January-2019

Armori is the Municipal council in district of Gadchiroli, Maharashtra.

== History ==
The Armori municipal council established on 12 September 2017.

== Municipal Council election ==
=== Electoral performance 2019 ===
S.No.	Party name	Alliance	Party flag or symbol	Number of Corporators
01	Shiv Sena (SS)	NDA		01
02	Bharatiya Janata Party (BJP)	NDA		08
03	Indian National Congress (INC)	UPA		06
04	Nationalist Congress Party (NCP)	UPA		00
05	Communist Party of India (CPI)			01
06	Parivartan Alliance			01
