= Atmakur, Hanamkonda district =

Atmakur (Desai Atmakur)
- village
- Location in Telangana, India Atmakur (India)
- Coordinates: 18.071791°N 79.738585°E
- Country: India
- State: Telangana
- District: Hanamkonda district

Languages
  - Official: Telugu
- Time zone: UTC+5:30 (IST)
- PIN: 506342
- Vehicle registration: TS
- Website: telangana.gov.in

Atmakur is a village and mandal in Hanamkonda district from the state of Telangana in India.

- List of villages in Atmakur mandal:

1. Agrampahad
2. Atmakur
3. Brahamanpalle
4. Choudla Palle
5. Damera
6. House Buzurg
7. Kamaram
8. Katakshapur
9. Kothagattu
10. Malakpet
11. Neerukulla
12. Peddapur
13. Penchikalpet.
