= Protection of Plant Varieties and Farmers' Rights Act, 2001 =

Parliament of India
- Long title: An Act to provide for the establishment of an effective system for protection of plant varieties, the rights of farmers and plant breeders and to encourage the development of new varieties of plants.
- Citation: Act No. 53 of 2001
- Enacted by: Parliament of India
- Assented to: 30 October 2001
- Status: In force

The Protection of Plant Variety and Farmers' Right Act, 2001 (PPVFR Act) is an sui-generis Act of the Parliament of India granting intellectual property rights to plant breeders, researchers and farmers who develop new varieties, extant plant varieties and farmers' variety. This act received the assent of the President of India on the 30 October 2001.

The PPV&FR Act, 2001 was enacted to provide for the establishment of an effective system for the protection of plant varieties, the rights of farmers and plant breeders, and to encourage the development and cultivation of new varieties of plants. In addition to establishing new rights, the act also contains compulsory licence provisions and establishes a prize for communities that develop artificial or conserve natural biodiversity.

== Rights ==
Under the Act, registration of a plant variety confers two heritable and assignable rights: one for the variety and the other for the denomination assigned to it by the breeder.

The rights granted under this Act are exclusive right to produce, sell, market, distribute, import and export the variety. The period of protection for field crops is 15 years; for trees and vines, it is 18 years; for notified varieties it is 15 years from the date of notification under section 5 of Seeds Act, 1966.

=== Eligibility ===
Under this Act, Essentially Derived Varieties (EDV) can also be registered, and may be new or extant. Farmers are entitled to save, use, sow, re-sow, exchange or sell their farm produce including seed of a registered variety in an unbranded manner.

Annual fee has to be paid every year for maintaining the registration and renewal fee has to be paid for the extended period of registration. Farmers' varieties are eligible for registration and farmers are totally exempted from payment of any fee in any proceedings under the Act.

== Disputes ==
Farmers can claim for compensation if the registered variety fails to provide expected performance under given conditions.

Civil and criminal remedies are provided for enforcement of breeders' rights.

== Benefit sharing ==
Provisions relating to benefit sharing and compulsory licence in case registered variety is not made available to the public at reasonable price are provided. Compensation is also provided for village or rural communities if any registered variety has been developed using any variety in whose evolution such village or local community has contributed significantly. The procedural details and modes of implementing this Act are provided in PPV&FR Rules, 2003.

=== Prize pool ===
Genetic resources of economic plants and their wild relatives particularly in areas identified as agro-biodiversity hotspots are awarded annually from Gene Fund. The name of the award is Plant Genome Saviour Community Award and the amount is INR 10,00,000 for each community. A maximum of five awards are conferred in a year.

The Protection of Plant Varieties and Farmers' Rights Authority also confers Plant Genome Savior "Farmer Reward" and "Farmer Recognition" to the farmers engaged in the conservation of genetic resources of landraces and wild relatives of economic plants and their improvement through selection and preservation and the material so selected and preserved has been used as donors of gene in varieties registerable under the PPV&FR Act, 2001 (53 of 2001). Up )to 10 rewards and 20 recognitions (consisting of a citation, memento and cash prize) are conferred in a year.

== See also ==
- International Union for the Protection of New Varieties of Plants
- Biological Diversity Act, 2002
