= George Marshall Woodrow =

British botanist (1846–1911)

George Marshall Woodrow (14 February 1846 - 8 June 1911) was a British botanist who made contribution to the study of plants in Western India, particularly in the Northern Western Ghats. He served as a gardener at Royal Botanical Gardens, Kew, in England from 1865 onward. In 1872 he traveled to India to be in charge of Ganeshkind Experimental Garden at Pune and public gardens of Poona. He worked as a lecturer at R. College of Science Poona in 1879 and was the Director of Botanic Survey of Western India 1893–9. In 1898 he participated in K D Naegamvala's expedition to observe the total solar eclipse of 22 January. He died in Lanarkshire.

The standard author abbreviation Woodrow is used to indicate this person as the author when citing a botanical name.

== Accomplishments ==
=== Species described by Woodrow ===
- Abutilon ranadei
- Garnotia arborum

=== Species named after Woodrow ===
- Cissus woodrowii
- Crinum woodrowii
- Dichanthium woodrowii

=== Notable writings ===
- Notes on a Journey from Haveri to Kumta (1894)
- Notes on a Journey from Poona to Nagotana (1894)
- The Flora of Western India (Journal of the Bombay Natural History Society, 1897)
- Gardening in India (1903)
- The Mango: Its Culture and Varieties (1904)
