= Armori =

City in Maharashtra, India

- City
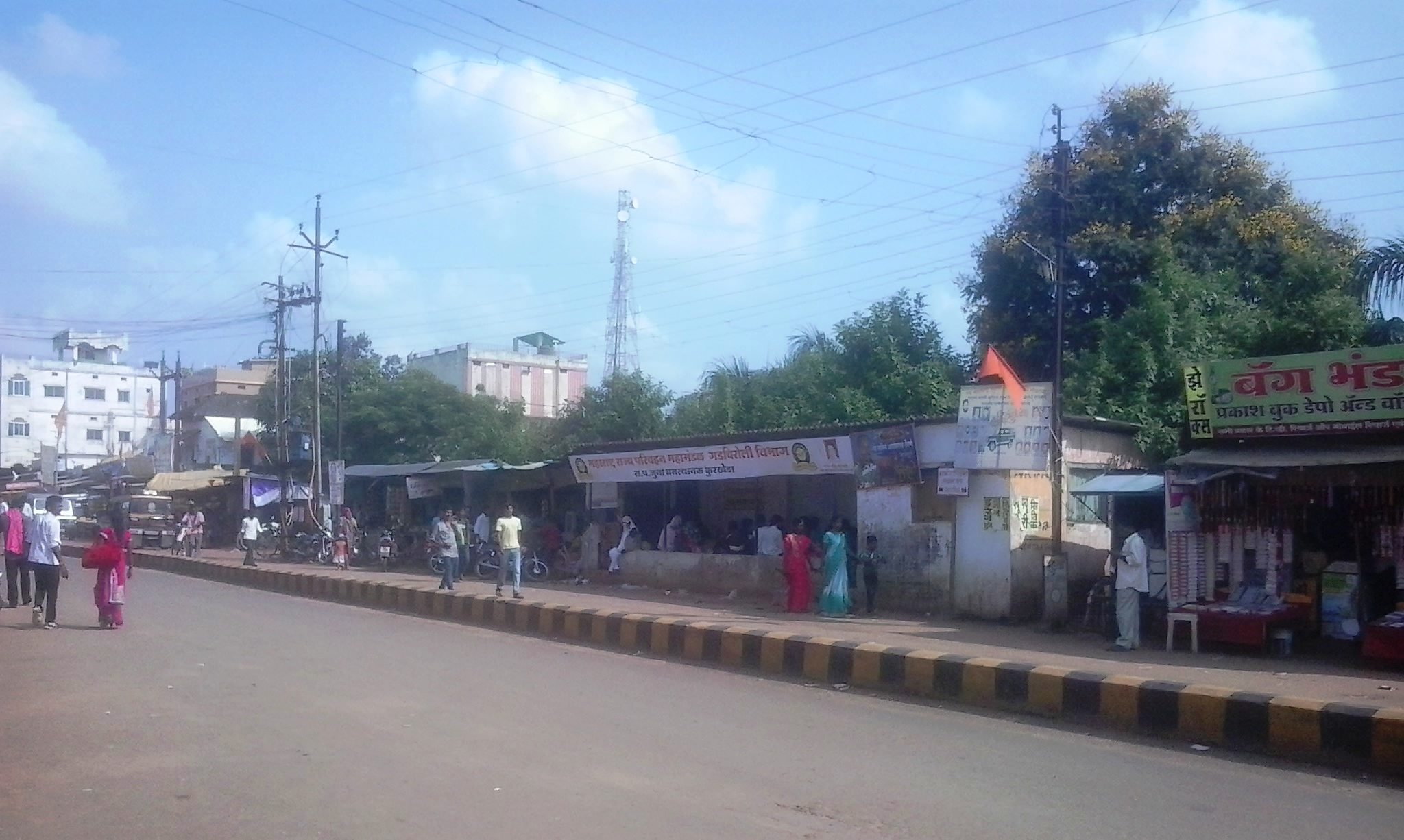
- Main road in Armori

- Location in Maharashtra, India Armori (India) Armori (Asia)
- Coordinates: 20.46°N 79.98°E
- Country: India
- State: Maharashtra
- District: Gadchiroli

Government
  - Type: Municipal Council
  - Body: Armori Municipal Council (AMC)
- Elevation: 199 m (653 ft)

Population (2011)
  - Total: 97,097

Language
  - Official: Marathi, Hindi and English
- Time zone: UTC+5:30 (IST)
- PIN: 441208
- Telephone code: 07137

Armori is a city and municipal council in the Gadchiroli district in the Indian state of Maharashtra. It is connected with the National Highway NH-353C.

It is located on the left of the Wainganga River, a tributary of the Pranahita River which meets the Godavari River.

== Geography ==
Armori is located at 20.46°N 79.98°E. It has an average elevation of 199 metres (676 feet).

It is part of Desaiganj subdivision of Gadchiroli district along with the tehsils Desaiganj, Kurkheda and Korchi.

== Demographics ==
As per Indian government census of 2011, the population was 97097.

Year	Male	Female	Total Population	Change	Religion (%)							
Year	Male	Female	Total Population	Change	Hindu	Muslim	Christian	Sikhs	Buddhist	Jain	Other religions and persuasions	Religion not stated
2001	45760	45086	90846	-	87.387	1.058	0.055	0.133	9.745	0.037	1.027	0.557
2011	48887	48210	97097	6.881	87.658	1.137	0.090	0.118	9.602	0.069	0.665	0.661

== Transport ==
=== Road ===
Armori is well connected to major industrial and commercial places by road. It is about 140 km from the city of Nagpur and about 36 km from district headquarters, Gadchiroli. The Maharashtra State Road Transport Corporation (MSRTC) runs buses connecting Gadchiroli to Nagpur via Armori, Brahmpuri, Nagbhid, Umrer with a frequency of about 45 min.

=== Rail ===
Nearest railway station is Wadsa (Desaiganj) which is 18 km from Armori town. The other nearby railway stations are Brahmpuri (21 km), Nagpur (140 km). Railway ministry proposed new rail line from Wadsa (Desaiganj) to Gadchiroli via Armori.

=== Air ===
Nearest airport is Dr. Babasaheb Ambedkar International Airport, Nagpur which is about 130 km from the town of Armori.

== See also ==
- Armori Municipal Council
