= Vagaikulam Bird Habitat =

Indian wildlife refuge

The Vagaikulam Bird Habitat is an Indian wildlife refuge, located to west of Alwarkurichi, Tamil Nadu, India.

== History ==
Vaigaikulam receives water from Ramanadhi dam. In 1996 many babul trees were planted in the area by the Social Forestry division of Tamil Nadu forest department. In 2008, most of the trees were removed, but due to media coverage of danger to the area's birds, 20% of the trees were saved. Based on research conducted by Ashoka Trust for Research in Ecology and the Environment (ATREE) it was found that Vaigaikulam had the potential to become a bird sanctuary like nearby Koonthankulam. ATREE then began working with community students to monitor the refuge's bird population. Sri Paramakalyani Centre for Environmental Sciences also partners with ATREE on the conservation efforts of bird habitat by creating awareness among the public on the importance of birds in ecosystem services and their role as indicators of wetland ecosystem health.

== Bird species ==
Bird species like Black headed Ibis, Glossy Ibis, Night Heron, Indian Cormorant, Little cormorant have been observed in the refuge. Garganey, Northern Shoveler, Pintail, Rosy Pastor have been observed in the winter, having migrated from southern Russia.
