= National Highway 930 (India) =

National highway in India

National Highway 930
- Map of the National Highway in red

Route information
- Auxiliary route of NH 30
- Length: 396 km (246 mi)

Major junctions
- West end: Purur
- NH 930D - Chandrapur NH 347A - Warora
- East end: Karanji

Location
- Country: India
- States: Chhattisgarh, Maharashtra

Highway system
- Roads in India; Expressways; National; State; Asian
← NH 30	→ NH 44

National Highway 930, commonly referred to as NH 930 is a national highway in India. It is a spur road of National Highway 30. NH-930 traverses the states of Chhattisgarh and Maharashtra in India.

== Route ==
Chhattisgarh

Purur - Balod - Kusumkasa - Manpur - Maharashtra border

Maharashtra

Sawargaon border - Muramgaon- Dhanora - Gadchiroli - Saoli - Mul - Chandrapur - Warora - Wani - Karanji

== Junctions ==
NH 30 Terminal near Raipur
NH 930D near Chandrapur
NH 347A near Warora
NH 44 Terminal near Sarangarh

== See also ==
- List of national highways in India
- List of national highways in India by state
