= Hogrekan =

Biodiversity heritage site in India

Hogrekan Biodiversity Heritage Site
- Hogrekan BHS
- Location: Chikkamagaluru district, Karnataka, India
- Area: 2,508.06 acres (1,014.98 ha)
- Established: June 5 (World Environment Day)
- Governing body: Karnataka State Forest Department and Biodiversity Board

Hogrekan in the Chikkamagaluru district of Karnataka is a biodiversity heritage site. It was declared as a biodiversity heritage site on 5 June, World Environment Day by the Karnataka State Forest Department and the Biodiversity Board. Hogrekan is located in Taluka Kaduru, where it covers a total area of 2508.06 acres. It consists of lush vegetation and is connected with Bhadra Wildlife Sanctuary, Bababudangiri and Kemmangundi, it is also a part of the Yemedoddi Tiger reserve. The vegetation includes dry deciduous forests which have several other distinct floral species and medicinal plants. It serves as a "Wildlife Corridor" for Kudremukha and Bhadra Wildlife Sanctuary.

== Shola ==
Hogrekan is also known for the Shola vegetation; this vegetation has a lot of unique medicinal plants. The Shola forest is a stunted tropical montane forest, in which undulating grasslands are scattered. Several floral species in this area have medicinal properties and are also endemic. These grasslands (Shola) are said to be thousands of years old.
