= Ashti, Gadchiroli =

Town in Maharashtra

Ashti
- Village
- Nickname: Ashtikar gadchiroli
- Location in Maharashtra, India Ashti (India)
- Coordinates: 19.681°N 79.801°E
- Country: India
- State: Maharashtra
- District: Gadchiroli

Government
  - Type: largest in districtGram panchayat

Population (2011)
  - Total: 11,752
- Demonym: Ashtikar

Language
  - Official: Marathi
- Time zone: UTC+5:30 (IST)
- PIN: 442707
- Area code: 07135
- Vehicle registration: MH-33

Ashti Gadchiroli is a village in Chamorshi taluka of Gadchiroli district in Maharashtra state of India.

== Demography ==
The population in Ashti Nokewada village is 5634 as per the survey of census during 2011 by Indian Government with 183 Households in village. Out of 750 population, there are 382 males and 368 females.

Total Scheduled Caste are 245. Total Scheduled Tribe are 61. Literates are 617 of which males are 318 and Females are 299. There are 133 Illiterates.

Year	Male	Female	Total Population	Change	Religion (%)							
Year	Male	Female	Total Population	Change	Hindu	Muslim	Christian	Sikhs	Buddhist	Jain	Other religions and persuasions	Religion not stated
2011	2886	2748	5634	-	70.430	3.035	0.284	0.000	26.038	0.018	0.071	0.124

== Transport ==
Ashti is located 69 km (43 mi) towards South from district headquarters Gadchiroli, 35 km (22 mi) from Chamorshi and 857 km (533 mi) from State capital Mumbai. Nearest railway station from village is Sirpur 38 km (24 mi), Wihirgaon43 km (27 mi), Mukudi43 km (27 mi) and Wirur44 km (27 mi).
