= Chamorshi =

Chamorshi The town of rice
- Town
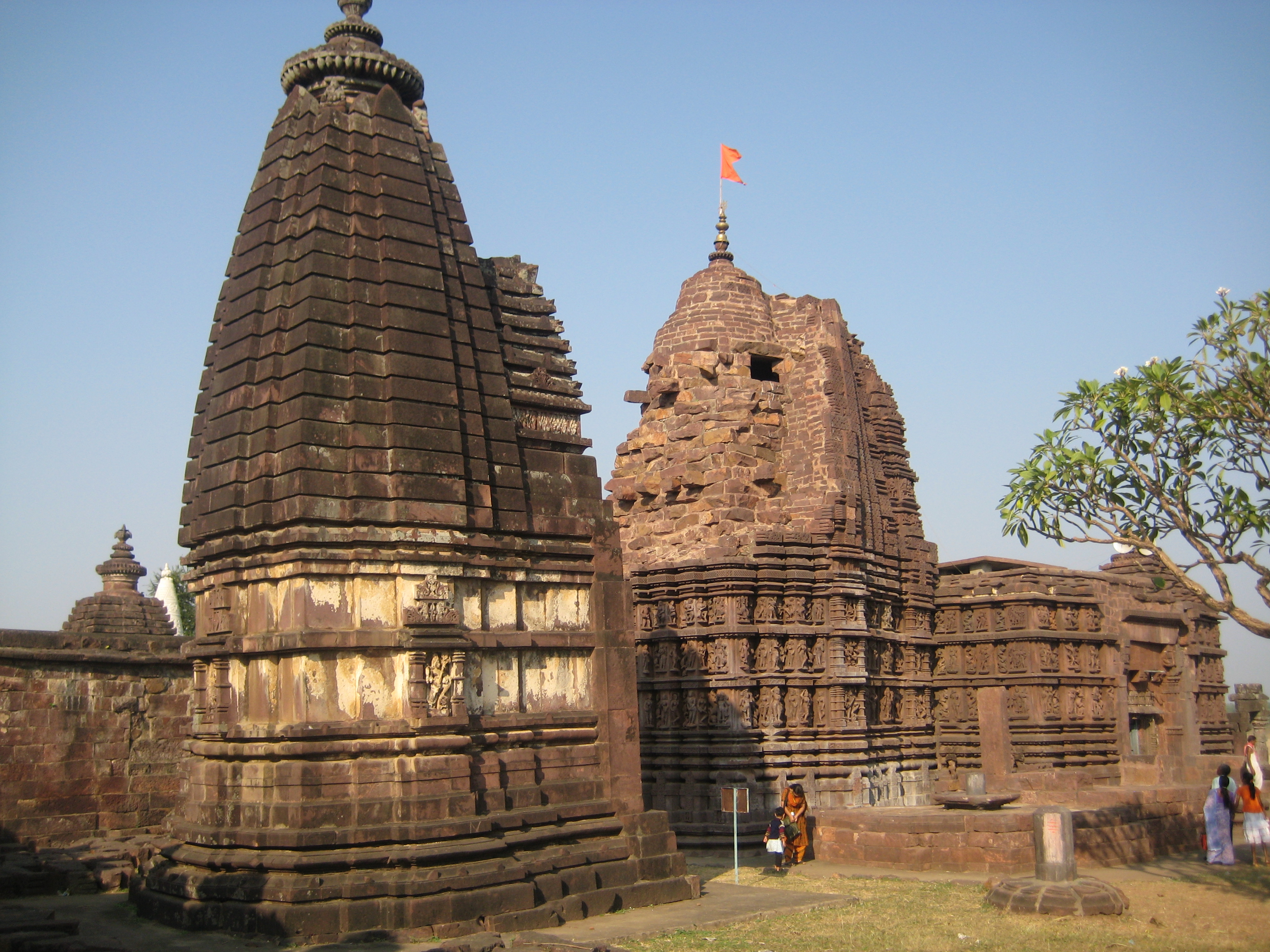
- Markanda temples

- Location in Maharashtra, India
- Coordinates: 19.938°N 79.890°E
- Country: India
- State: Maharashtra
- District: Gadchiroli

Government
  - Type: Maharashtra Government
  - Body: BJP
- Elevation: 120 m (390 ft)

Population (2011)
  - Total: 179,120
  - Rank: 3rd in district population wise
- Demonym: chamorshikar

Languages
  - Official: Marathi
- Time zone: UTC+5:30 (IST)
- Postal code: 442603
- Vehicle registration: MH 33

Chamorshi is a town and a tehsil in Gadchiroli district in the Indian state of Maharashtra.

== Geography ==
Chamorshi is located near the east bank of the Wainganga River, which joins the Wardha River at Chaprala to form the Pranahita River; the Pranahita then meets the Godavari River. It is known for the ancient temple of god Markandeshwar in Markanda.

The temple is situated on the bank of the Wainganga, which flows generally from north to south but at Markanda turns northward for 20 km before again going south. Markanda is also known as (vidharbhachi kashi).

Year	Male	Female	Total Population	Change	Religion (%)							
Year	Male	Female	Total Population	Change	Hindu	Muslim	Christian	Sikhs	Buddhist	Jain	Other religions and persuasions	Religion not stated
2001	83886	81628	165514	-	90.653	0.581	0.103	0.059	8.081	0.050	0.364	0.110
2011	90759	88361	179120	8.220	90.753	0.784	0.170	0.032	7.814	0.055	0.151	0.241

== See also ==
- Ashti, Gadchiroli
