= Biological Diversity Act, 2002 =

Indian act for the preservation of biological diversity in India

Parliament of India
- Long title: An Act to provide for conservation of biological diversity, sustainable use of its components, and fair and equitable sharing of the benefits arising out of the use of biological resources, knowledge and for matters connected therewith or incidental thereto.
- Citation: Act No. 18 of 2003
- Enacted by: Parliament of India
- Assented to: 5 February 2003
- Commenced: 1 October 2003 and 1 July 2004
- Status: In force

The Biological Diversity Act, 2002 is an Act by the Parliament of India for the preservation of biological diversity in India, and provides the mechanism for equitable sharing of benefits arising out of the use of traditional biological resources and knowledge. The Act was enacted to meet the obligations under the Convention on Biological Diversity, because India is a signatory to the treaty.

== History ==
The Act was enacted to meet the obligations under Convention on Biological Diversity, of which India was a party in 2002.

== Biodiversity and Biological Resource ==
Biodiversity has been defined under Section 2(b) of the Act as "the variability among living organisms from all sources and the ecological complexes of which they are part, and includes diversity within species or between species and of eco-systems". The Act also defines, biological resources as "plants, animals and micro-organisms or parts thereof, their genetic material and by-products (excluding value added products) with actual or potential use or value, but does not include human genetic material."

== National Biodiversity Authority and State Biodiversity Boards ==
The National Biodiversity Authority (NBA) is a statutory autonomous body, headquartered in Chennai, under the Ministry of Environment and Forests, Government of India established in 2003 to implement the provisions under the Act. State Biodiversity Boards (SBB) has been created in 28 States along with 31,574 Biological management committees (for each local body) across India.

=== Functions ===
- Regulation of acts prohibited under the Act
- Advise the Government on the conservation of biodiversity
- Advise the Government on selection of biological heritage sites
- Take appropriate steps to oppose the grant of intellectual property rights in foreign countries, arising from the use of biological resources or associated traditional knowledge.

== Regulations ==
A foreigner, non-resident Indian, as defined in the clause (30) of section 2 of The Income-tax Act, 1961, or a foreign company or body corporate need to take permission from the NBA before obtaining any biological resources or associated knowledge from India for research, survey, commercial utilisation. Indian citizens or body corporates need to take permission from the concerned State Biodiversity Board.

Result of research using biological resources from India cannot be transferred to a non-citizen or a foreign company without the permission of NBA. However, no such permission is needed for publication of the research in a journal or seminar, or in case of a collaborative research made by institutions approved by Central Government. The NBA while granting such permission may make an order for benefit sharing or royalty based on utilisation of such protection.

== Benefit sharing ==
Benefit sharing out of usage of biological resources can be done in following manner:

- Joint ownership of intellectual property rights 2 3 4
- Transfer of technology
- Location of production, research development units in the area of source
- Payment of monetary and non-monetary compensation
- Setting up of venture capital fund for aiding the cause of benefit claimers

== Penalties ==
If a person, violates the regulatory provisions he/she will be "punishable with imprisonment for a term which may extend to five years, or with fine which may extend to ten lakh rupees and where the damage caused exceeds ten lakh rupees, fine may commensurate {be in proportion} with the damage caused, or with both."

Any offence under this Act is non-bailable and is cognizable.

== See also ==
- List of Biodiversity Heritage Sites of India
- Traditional Knowledge Digital Library
- Indigenous intellectual property
- Convention on Biological Diversity
- Bioprospecting
- Protection of Plant Varieties and Farmers' Rights Act, 2001
