= Allapalli =

Village in Maharashtra

- Village
- Location in Maharashtra, India Allapalli (India)
- Coordinates: 19.43°N 80.06°E
- Country: India
- State: Maharashtra
- District: Gadchiroli
- Tahsil: Aheri

Area
  - Total: 3.49 km^{2} (1.35 sq mi)

Population (2011)
  - Total: 12,363
  - Density: 3,540/km^{2} (9,170/sq mi)

Languages
  - Official: Marathi
- Time zone: UTC+5:30 (IST)
- PIN: 442703
- Telephone code: 07133
- Vehicle registration: MH-33

Allapalli is a village located in the Gadchiroli district of Maharashtra, India.

== Geography ==
Allapalli is in southern Gadchiroli district, in a central part of Aheri tahsil. The village is laid out over 3.5 square kilometres (1.4 sq mi). The village is situated along National Highway 353C, at an intersection with a road that traverses the district and connects Aheri and Etapalli. South and east of the village in the taluk are large areas of reserved forest.

=== Glory of Allapalli Biodiversity Heritage Site ===
Allapalli is known for its nearby old-growth forests, which were first noted as worthy of preservation by the British in 1867. A six hectare patch of these forests located 16 km (9.9 mi) east of the village, named "Glory of Allapalli," was first designated for conservation in 1953, and in 2014 declared as the first Biodiversity Heritage Site in Maharashtra. More than 130 floral species have been observed at the site. Tree species include teak, tendu, dhawala, kusum, and yen trees, among others. Shrubs and herbs noted at the site include gunj, and tarota, gulwel, among others.

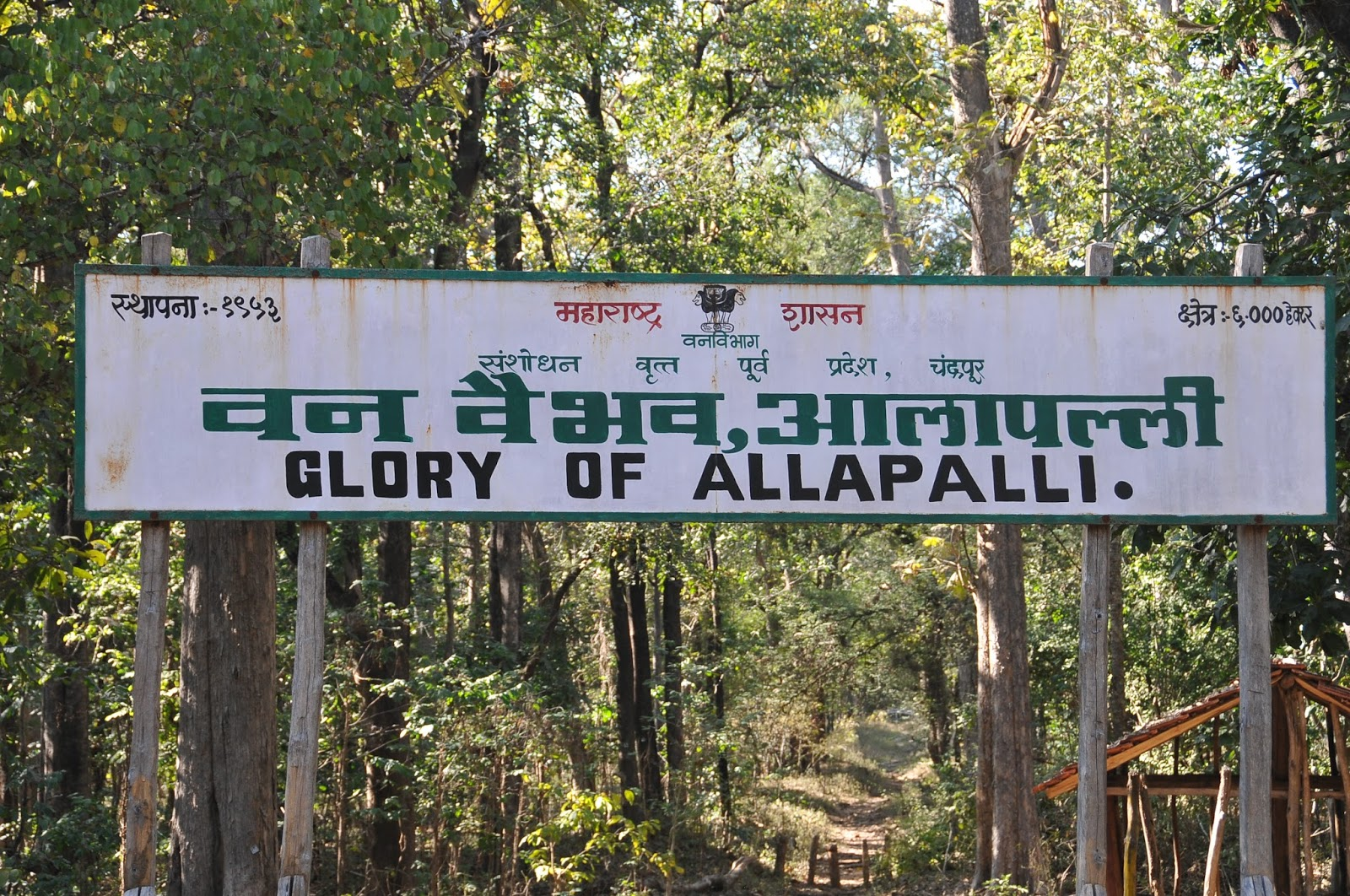
Gateway to the protected "Glory of Allapalli" forest area

=== Climate ===
Climate data for Allapalli
Month	Jan	Feb	Mar	Apr	May	Jun	Jul	Aug	Sep	Oct	Nov	Dec	Year
Mean daily maximum °C (°F)	29.7 (85.5)	32.8 (91.0)	36.5 (97.7)	39.5 (103.1)	41 (106)	35 (95)	29.9 (85.8)	29.3 (84.7)	30.5 (86.9)	31.6 (88.9)	31.1 (88.0)	29.6 (85.3)	33.0 (91.5)
Daily mean °C (°F)	23 (73)	26.1 (79.0)	29.7 (85.5)	33 (91)	35 (95)	30.6 (87.1)	26.8 (80.2)	26.3 (79.3)	26.8 (80.2)	26.6 (79.9)	25 (77)	23 (73)	27.7 (81.9)
Mean daily minimum °C (°F)	16.7 (62.1)	19.6 (67.3)	23 (73)	26.9 (80.4)	29.3 (84.7)	26.8 (80.2)	24.4 (75.9)	24 (75)	23.9 (75.0)	22.2 (72.0)	19.4 (66.9)	16.9 (62.4)	22.8 (72.9)
Average precipitation mm (inches)	12 (0.5)	7 (0.3)	15 (0.6)	16 (0.6)	29 (1.1)	241 (9.5)	436 (17.2)	376 (14.8)	230 (9.1)	78 (3.1)	17 (0.7)	7 (0.3)	1,464 (57.8)
Average rainy days	1	1	2	3	3	12	18	18	14	7	2	1	82
Average relative humidity (%)	49	44	36	37	34	60	82	85	83	70	56	50	57
Source: en.climate-data.org

== Demographics ==
As of the 2011 Census, Allapalli village had a population of 12,363 in 2,969 households, of which 6,251 were male, and 6,112 female. 1,301 were children between 0-6 years old. 5,321, or about 43% of the population, were Scheduled Castes and Scheduled Tribes.

== Economy ==
The 2011 Census lists 4,148 workers and 8,215 non-workers in Allapalli.

== Education ==
Schools in Allapalli provide pre-primary through senior secondary education. The 2011 census lists 9,368 of the total population as literate.
