= National Highway 731 (India) =

National highway in India

National Highway 731
- Map of the National Highway in red

Route information
- Auxiliary route of NH 31
- Length: 527 km (327 mi)

Major junctions
- South end: NH 31 in Saidpur
- List: NH 28 in Chandwak; NH 128A / NH 135A in Jaunpur; NH 319D in Badlapur; NH 128 / NH 330 in Sultanpur; NH 931 in Musafirkhana; NH 330A / NH 931A in Jagdishpur; NH 27 / NH 30 / NH 230 in Lucknow; NH 330D in Hardoi; NH 30 / NH 731K in Shahjahanpur; NH 730A in Powayan; NH 730 in Khutar
- North end: SH 90 in Palia Kalan, Lakhimpur Kheri district

Location
- Country: India
- States: Uttar Pradesh

Highway system
- Roads in India; Expressways; National; State; Asian
| ← NH 531 | → NH 731A |

National Highway 731 (NH 731) is a National Highway entirely located within Uttar Pradesh, India. It is a long spur route of NH 31 that links Saidpur to Palia Kalan via Lucknow. At its terminus in Palia Kalan, it continues as SH 90 towards the Nepal border at Gauriphanta where it links up with Nepal's NH 05. Its section between Lucknow and Saidpur roughly parallels that of the Purvanchal Expressway.
