= National Highway 931A (India) =

National highway in India

National Highway 931A
- Map of National Highway 931A in red

Route information
- Length: 55 km (34 mi)

Major junctions
- South end: Salon
- North end: Jagdishpur

Location
- Country: India
- States: Uttar Pradesh

Highway system
- Roads in India; Expressways; National; State; Asian
← NH 931	→ NH 32

National Highway 931A, commonly referred to as NH 931A is a national highway in India. It is a spur road of National Highway 31. NH-931A traverses the state of Uttar Pradesh in India.

== Route ==
Salon, Jais, Jagdishpur.

== Junctions ==
NH 31 Terminal near Salon.
NH 128 near Jais.
NH 731 Terminal near Jagdishpur.

== See also ==
- List of national highways in India
- List of national highways in India by state
