= National Highway 931 (India) =

National highway in India

National Highway 931
- Map of National Highway 931 in red

Route information
- Length: 68 km (42 mi)

Major junctions
- South end: Pratapgarh
- North end: Jagdishpur

Location
- Country: India
- States: Uttar Pradesh
- Primary destinations: Musafirkhana, Gauriganj, Amethi

Highway system
- Roads in India; Expressways; National; State; Asian
| ← NH 731A | → NH 931A |

National Highway 931, commonly referred to as NH 931 is a national highway in India. It is a spur road of National Highway 31. NH-931 traverses the state of Uttar Pradesh in India.

== Route ==
Pratapgarh, Amethi, Gauriganj, Musafirkhana, Jagdishpur.

== Junctions ==
NH 31 Terminal near Pratapgarh.
NH 128 near Gauriganj.
NH 731 Terminal near Jagdishpur.

== See also ==
- List of national highways in India
- List of national highways in India by state
