= National Highway 330 (India) =

National Highway in India

National Highway 330
- Map of National Highway 330 in red

Route information
- Auxiliary route of NH 30
- Length: 263.2 km (163.5 mi)

Major junctions
- South end: Prayagraj
- NH 31 Pratapgarh. NH 931 Pratapgarh. NH 128 Sultanpur. NH 731 Sultanpur. NH 27 Ayodhya. NH 233B Ayodhya. NH 135A Ayodhya. NH 330B Gonda. NH 730 Balrampur.
- North end: Balrampur

Location
- Country: India
- States: Uttar Pradesh
- Primary destinations: Ayodhya

Highway system
- Roads in India; Expressways; National; State; Asian
← NH 30	→ NH 730

National Highway 330 is a national highway in India that links Prayagraj, Uttar Pradesh to Balrampur in Uttar Pradesh. Previously this highway was named NH-96. NH 330 is a 4 Lane highway in UP.

== Major cities and towns ==
Route of NH-330 connects below mentioned major cities of U.P.

- Prayagraj
- Pratapgarh
- Sultanpur
- Bikapur
- Ayodhya
- Nawabganj
- Gonda
- Balrampur

== Junctions ==
NH 30 Terminal near Prayagraj.
NH 31 near Pratapgarh.
NH 931 near Pratapgarh.
NH 128 near Sultanpur.
NH 731 near Sultanpur.
NH 27 near Ayodhya.
NH 135A Ayodhya.
NH 330B near Gonda.
NH 730 Terminal near Balrampur.

== Toll plaza ==
- Prayagraj
- Ayodhya

== See also ==
- List of national highways in India
- National Highways Development Project
