= Penta =

Penta may refer to:

== Places ==
- Penta (Fisciano), an Italian hamlet (frazione) of Fisciano, Salerno
- Penta-di-Casinca, a French municipality of Corsica
- Penta, Chhattisgarh, a town in Dantewada district of Chhattisgarh, India
- Penta (river), a small river in Lithuania

== Other ==
- Penta, a video game character in Antarctic Adventure
- Penta Penguin, a video game character in the Crash Bandicoot series
- Pena Transportes Aéreos, a defunct Brazilian airline
- Penta engine, a piston engine design
- Pentagón Jr., a professional Mexican wrestler who uses the ring name "Penta"
- Penta Water, a brand of bottled water
- Volvo Penta, a subsidiary of Volvo
- Penta Investments, a Slovak private equity and investment group
- Penta, a Slovak motorcycles, Penta Torete and Penta Dakarino
- The herbaceous vine Gynostemma pentaphyllum, or jiaogulan
- penta-, Greek numeral prefix meaning "five"
- Pentachlorophenol, a pesticide
- Pentaerythritol tetranitrate, an explosive material
- Penta, a section of the newspaper Barron's

== See also ==
- Pentax
