= National Highway 330A (India) =

National highway in India

National Highway 330A
- Map of the National Highway in red

Route information
- Length: 130 km (81 mi)

Major junctions
- From: Raebareli
- To: Ayodhya

Location
- Country: India
- States: Uttar Pradesh

Highway system
- Roads in India; Expressways; National; State; Asian
← NH 731	→ NH 330

National Highway 330A, commonly referred to as NH 330A is a national highway in India. It is a spur road of National Highway 30. NH-330A traverses the state of Uttar Pradesh in India.

NH 330A is a 4 Lane highway in UP.

== Toll (toll plaza or toll tax) ==
- Milkipur

== See also ==
- List of national highways in India
- National Highways Development Project
