= National Highway 927 (India) =

National highway in India

National Highway 927
- Map of National Highway 927 in red

Route information
- Length: 152 km (94 mi)

Major junctions
- North end: NH58 in Nepalganj at India/Nepal border
- NH 330B in Jarwal; NH 730 in Nanpara
- South end: NH 27 in Barabanki

Location
- Country: India
- States: Uttar Pradesh
- Primary destinations: Bahraich

Highway system
- Roads in India; Expressways; National; State; Asian
← NH 727H	→ NH 927A

National Highway 927 (NH 927) is a National Highway in India. It is a spur route of NH 27, that connects Barabanki near Lucknow to the Nepalese border at Nepalgunj and onto NH 58 in Nepal.
