= National Highway 727BB (India) =

National Highway in India

National Highway 727BB

Route information
- Auxiliary route of NH 27
- Length: 31 km (19 mi)

Major junctions
- South end: Gorakhpur
- North end: Partawal

Location
- Country: India
- States: Uttar Pradesh

Highway system
- Roads in India; Expressways; National; State; Asian
← NH 27	→ NH 730

National Highway 727BB, commonly referred to as NH 727BB is a national highway in India. It is a secondary route of National Highway 27. NH-727BB runs in the state of Uttar Pradesh in India.

== Route ==
NH727BB connects Gorakhpur and Partawal in the state of Uttar Pradesh.

== Junctions ==
NH 27 Terminal near Gorakhpur.
NH 730 Terminal near Partawal.

== See also ==
- List of national highways in India
- List of national highways in India by state
