= Santhebennur Pushkarini =

Historic pond in Karnataka, India

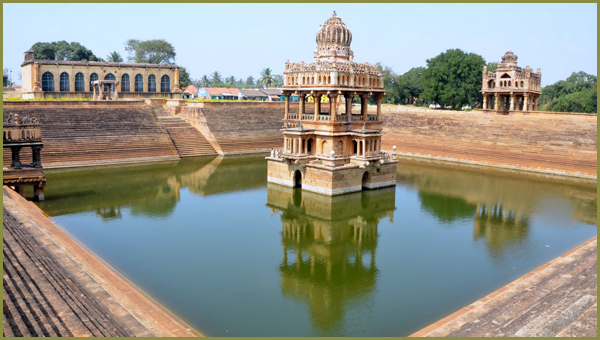
Pushkarani

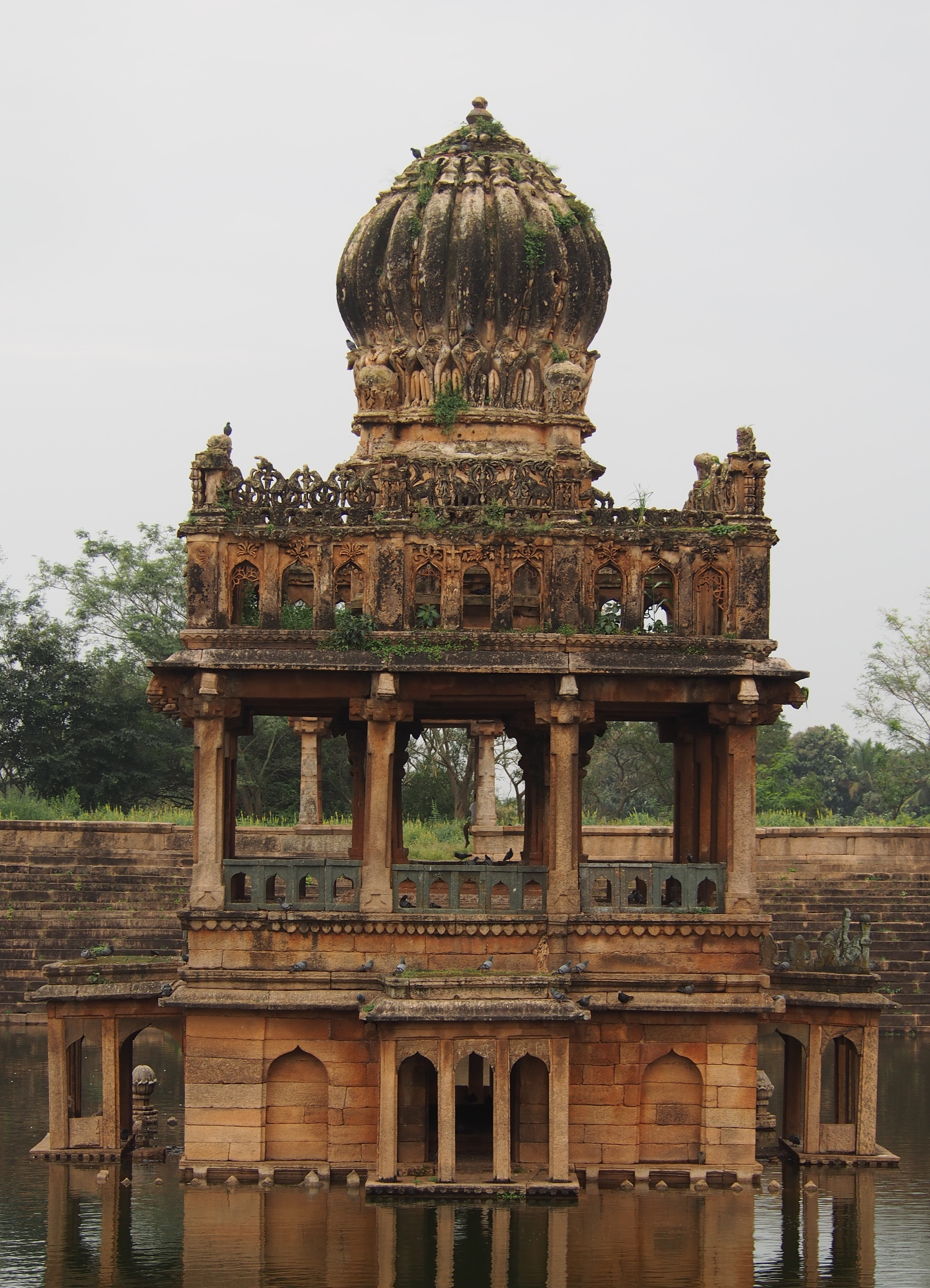
Vasanta Mantapa, Santhebennur Pushkarini

Santhebennur Pushkarini, locally known as Santebennur Honda, is a historic pond in Santhebennur village in Channagiri taluk of Karnataka, India. It was built by a local palegar, Kenga Hanumantappa Nayaka, in the 16th century.

== History ==
In the 16th century AD, Kenga Hanumantappa Nayaka built a temple in this area for his family deity, Lord Rama. He also built the sacred pond in this area. Vasanta Mantapa, a tower at the centre of the pushkarini is believed to be built to commemorate Kenga Hanumantappa Nayaka's victory over the Bahmani rulers of Bijapur. In the 17th century, the army of Bijapur invaded Santhebennur. Ranadullakhan, the commander of Bijapur, along with his followers Pattekhan and Faridkhan, constructed a musafirkhana (a rest house for travellers) on the bank of the pond. Later he also built a mosque in the area.

== Construction ==
Pushkarini has a length of 250 feet (76 m) and width of 240 feet (73 m), and the depth is over 30 feet (9.1 m). The sides are lined with granite steps. Originally there were eight towers; only six remain.

At the centre of the pond is Vasantha Mantapa, also known as karanji (fountain) mantapa, a symmetrical pillared tower which is built in Indo-Arabic style of architecture. It is built using granite, brick and mortar. The design of this multi-levelled tower, which covers an area about 34 sq ft (3.2 m^{2}), is in such a way that it appears to be floating in water when viewed from the banks of the pond. The arches, vaults and domes of the mantapa are built in the Arabic style of architecture while its columns, pyramidical towers and carvings are built in the Indian style. According to the local people, the water can cover the mantapa to a height of 10 feet (3.0 m) when the pond is full.

The Musafirkhana adjacent to the pond is a spacious building 150 feet (46 m) long and 40 feet (12 m) wide. It is made of granite stones and displays Muslim architectural style. A large, pillared hall within the building was probably a prayer hall. For sometime, this building was also used a military store.
