= National Highway 730H (India) =

National Highway in India

National Highway 730H
- Map of National Highway 730H in red

Route information
- Auxiliary route of NH 30
- Length: 48 km (30 mi)

Major junctions
- South end: Kudwa
- North end: Katarniaghat

Location
- Country: India
- States: Uttar Pradesh

Highway system
- Roads in India; Expressways; National; State; Asian
← NH 730	→ NH 730H

National Highway 730H, commonly referred to as NH 730H is a national highway in India. It is a spur road of National Highway 30. NH-730H runs in the state of Uttar Pradesh in India.

== Route ==
NH730H connects Kudwa, Mihinpurwa, Motipur, Nishangarh, Bichia and Katarniaghat in the state of Uttar Pradesh.

== Junctions ==
NH 730 Terminal near Kudwa.

== See also ==
- List of national highways in India
- List of national highways in India by state
