= Rampur Dhobiya Har =

- Village
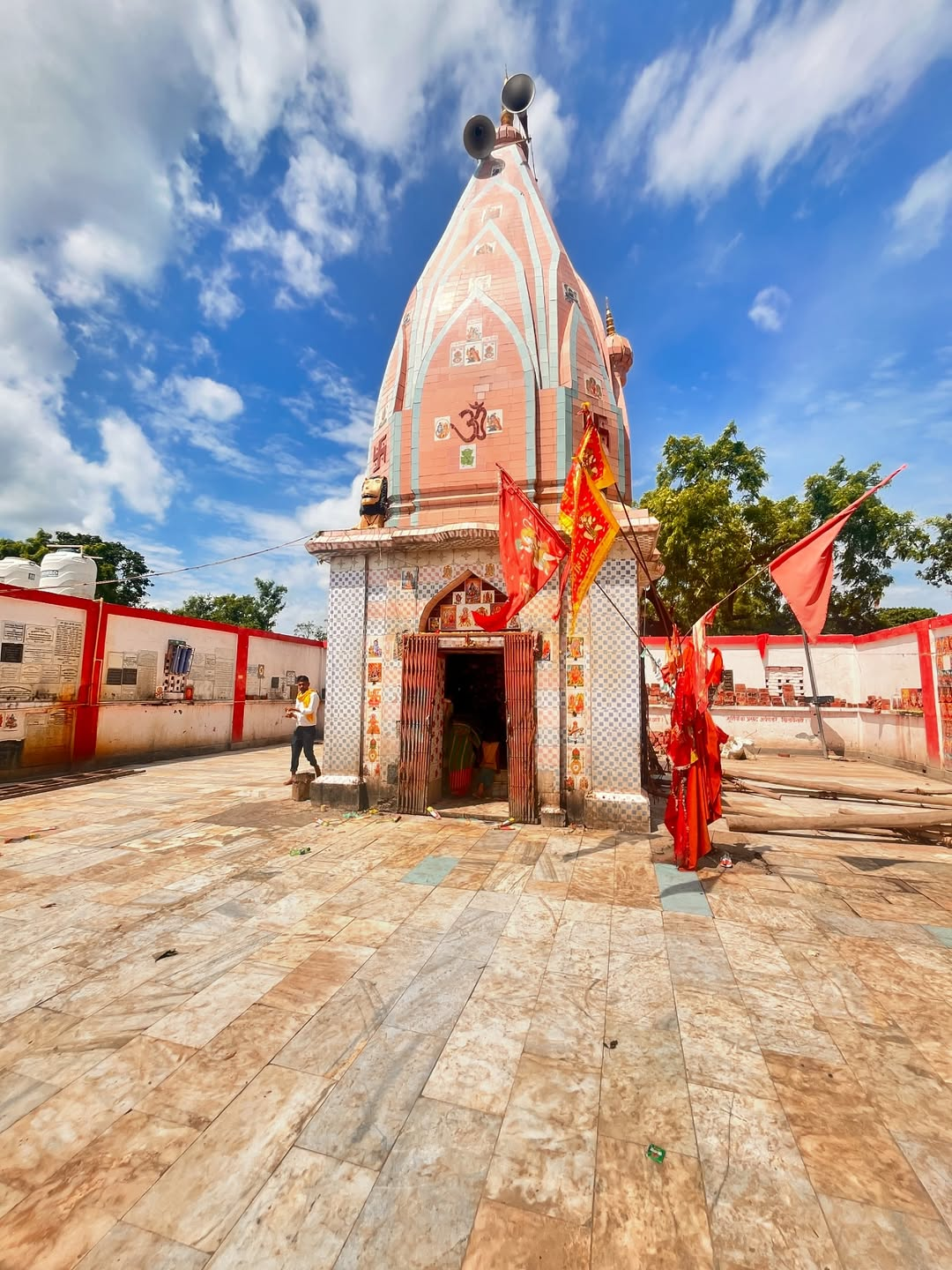
- Baba Budheshwar Nath Temple

- Location in Bahraich, India
- Coordinates: 27.88°N 81.35°E
- Country: India
- State: Uttar Pradesh
- District: Bahraich
- Sub-District: Nanpara

Population (2011)
  - Total: 6,202
- Time zone: UTC+5:30 (IST)
- Pin Code: 271830
- Vehicle registration: UP 40

Rampur Dhobiya Har is a village located in Nanpara Tehsil, of Bahraich district in Uttar Pradesh, India.

== About ==
According to the 2011 census the location code or village code of Rampur Dhobiya Har is 171489. Rampur Dhobiya Har is located in Nanpara Tehsil of Bahraich district in Uttar Pradesh, India. It is situated 35 km away from sub-district headquarter Nanpara and 70 km away from district headquarter Bahraich. As per 2009 statistics, Rampur Dhobiya Har is the gram panchayat of Rampur Dhobiya Har village.

The total geographical area of the village is 930.36 hectares. Rampur Dhobiya Har has a total population of 6,202 people. There are about 1,151 houses in the village. Nanpara is the nearest town to Rampur Dhobiya Har, which is approximately 35 km away.

== Demographics ==
The village is home to 6,202 people, among them 3,314 (53%) are male and 2,888 (47%) are female. 85% of the whole population are from general caste, 15% are from scheduled caste. The population of children (aged under 6 years) of the village is 19%; among them 53% are boys and 47% are girls. There are 1,151 households in the village and an average 5 persons live in each family.

== Population Growth ==
Population of the village has increased by 33.6% in last 10 years. In the 2001 census the total population was 4,643. Female population growth rate of the village is 40.5% which is 12.4% higher than male population growth rate of 28.1%. General caste population has increased by 39.8%; schedule caste population has increased by 7% and child population has increased by 43.5% in the village since the last census.

== Education ==
Rampur Dhobiya Har has many educational institutions, three inter colleges, and one graduate/postgraduate college.

== Religious View ==
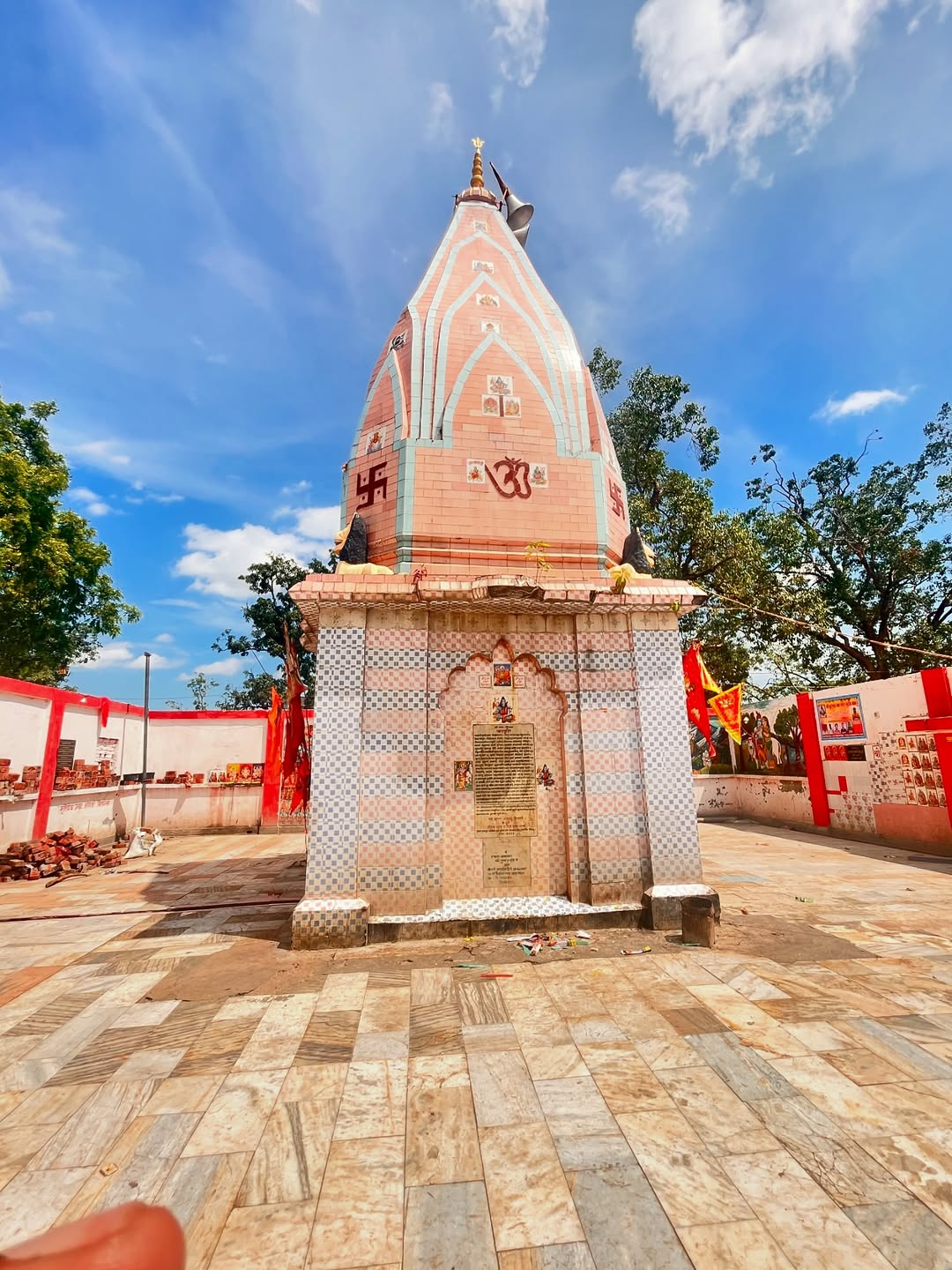
Baba Budheshwar Nath Temple

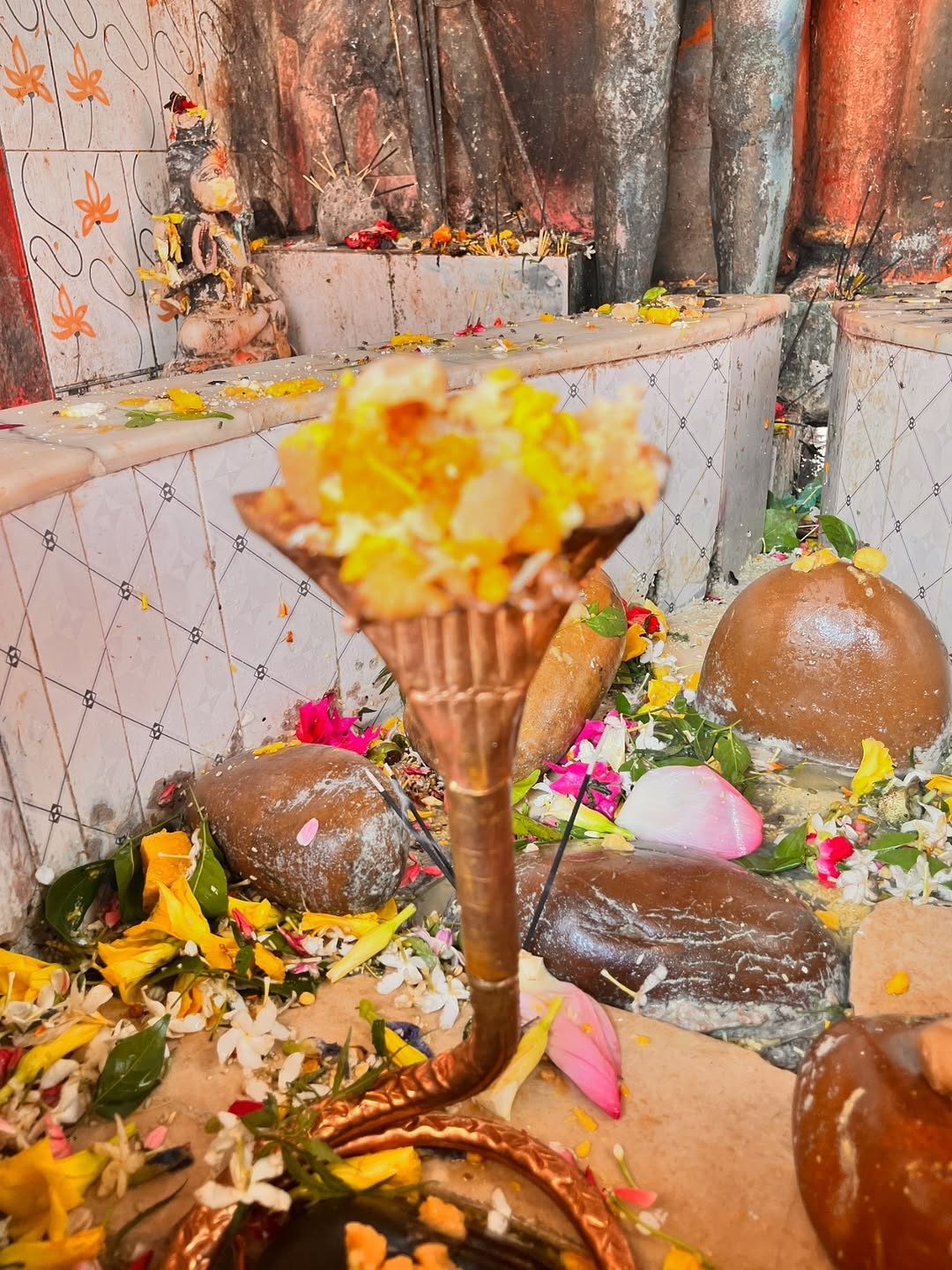

Baba Budheshwar Nath Temple is situated in this village. This temple is very famous in its surrounding area and attracts a large number of devotees.

According to local belief, the wishes of all devotees who pray here with a sincere heart are fulfilled by the blessings of Lord Shiva.
