= National Highway 330B (India) =

National highway in India

National Highway 330B
- Map of the National Highway in red

Route information
- Auxiliary route of NH 30
- Length: 48 km (30 mi)

Major junctions
- East end: Gonda
- West end: Jarwal

Location
- Country: India
- States: Uttar Pradesh

Highway system
- Roads in India; Expressways; National; State; Asian
← NH 330	→ NH 329

National Highway 330B, commonly referred to as NH 330B is a national highway in India. It is a spur road of National Highway 330. NH-330B traverses the state of Uttar Pradesh in India.

== Route ==
Gonda - Jarwal.

== Junction list ==
NH 330 Terminal near Gonda.
NH 927 Terminal near Jarwal.

== See also ==
- List of national highways in India
- List of national highways in India by state
- National Highways Development Project
