= National Highway 130B (India) =

National highway in India

National Highway 130B
- Map of the National Highway in red

Route information
- Auxiliary route of NH 30
- Length: 178 km (111 mi)

Major junctions
- West end: Raipur
- East end: Sarangarh

Location
- Country: India
- States: Chhattisgarh

Highway system
- Roads in India; Expressways; National; State; Asian
← NH 30	→ NH 153

National Highway 130B, commonly referred to as NH 130B, is a national highway in India. It is a spur road of National Highway 30. NH-130B traverses through the state of Chhattisgarh.

== Route ==
The highway starts from Raipur on NH-30 and goes through Palari, Baloda Bazar, Kasdol, and ends at its junction with NH 153 near Sarangarh in the state of Chhattisgarh.

== Junctions ==
NH 30 Terminal near Raipur.
NH 153 Terminal near Sarangarh.

== See also ==
- List of national highways in India
- List of national highways in India by state
