= National Highway 330D (India) =

National Highway in India

National Highway 330D

Route information
- Auxiliary route of NH 30
- Length: 129 km (80 mi)

Major junctions
- North end: Sitapur
- South end: Kannauj

Location
- Country: India
- States: Uttar Pradesh

Highway system
- Roads in India; Expressways; National; State; Asian
← NH 30	→ NH 34

National Highway 330D, commonly referred to as NH 330D is a national highway in India. It is a secondary route of National Highway 30. NH-330D runs in the state of Uttar Pradesh in India.

== Route ==
NH330D connects Sitapur, Misrikh, Pratap Nagar, Hardoi, Bilgram and Kannauj in the state of Uttar Pradesh.

== Junctions ==
NH 30 Terminal near Sitapur.
NH 731 near Hardoi
NH 34 Terminal near Kannauj.

== See also ==
- List of national highways in India
- List of national highways in India by state
