= Nellipaka =

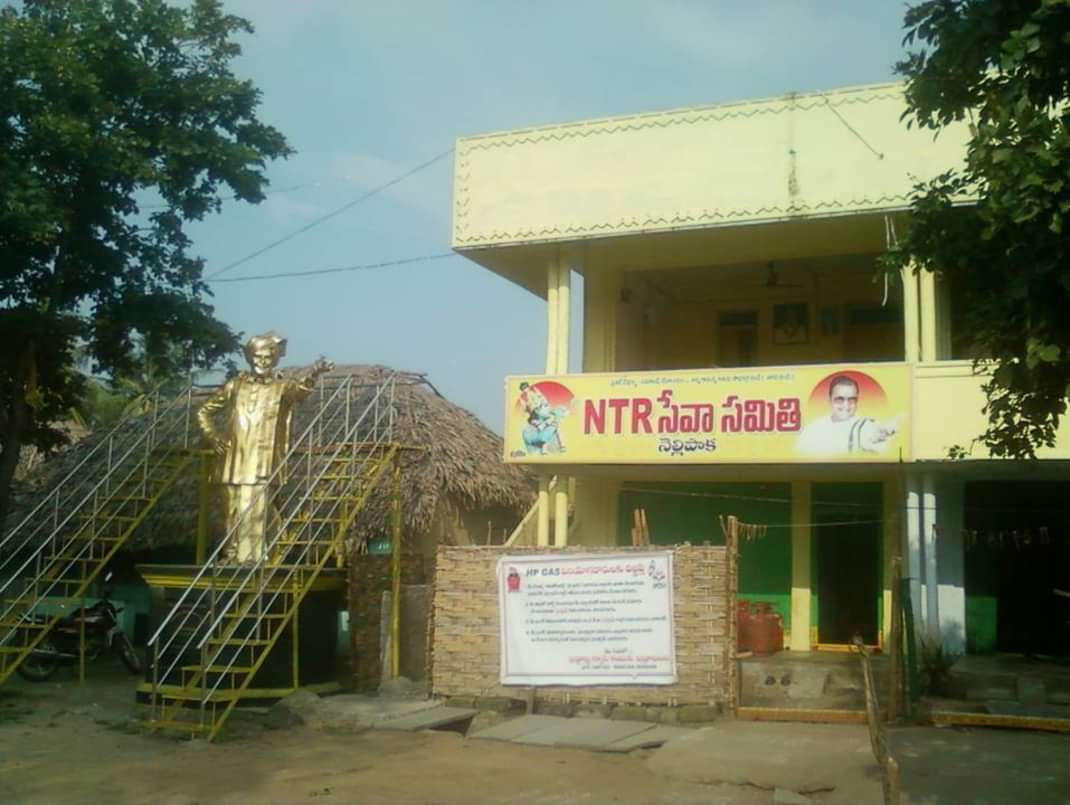
Nellipaka Nellipaka village
- Village
- Interactive map of Nellipaka
- Location in Andhra Pradesh, India
- Coordinates: 17°40′0″N 80°59′0″E
- Country: India
- State: Andhra Pradesh
- District: Polavaram

Languages
  - Official: Telugu
- Time zone: UTC+5:30 (IST)
- PIN: 507129
- Vehicle registration: AP

Nellipaka is a village in Polavaram district of the Indian state of Andhra Pradesh. It is located in Nellipaka mandal of Rampachodavaram revenue division. Nellipaka which also produces Red chillies with an output of approximately 25 tons of chillies per acre. Nellipaka is situated at the banks of River Godavari with population around 1600 people.

Nellipaka is 56 km from Bhadrachalam Railway station.

== Geography ==
It is located at 17°40′0″N 80°59′0″E.

== Transport ==
Nellipaka is connected to Vijayawada by National Highway 30. It is situated 15 km from Bhadrachalam
