= National Highway 130CD (India) =

National Highway in India

National Highway 130CD
- Map of National Highway 130CD in red

Route information
- Auxiliary route of NH 30
- Length: 214 km (133 mi)

Major junctions
- North end: Kurud
- South end: Papadahandi

Location
- Country: India
- States: Odisha, Chhattisgarh

Highway system
- Roads in India; Expressways; National; State; Asian
← NH 30	→ NH 26

National Highway 130CD, commonly referred to as NH 130CD is a national highway in India. It is a spur road of National Highway 30. NH-130CD traverses the states of Odisha and Chhattisgarh in India.

== Route ==
Chhattisgarh

Kurud, Umarda, Megha, Bijhuli, Singhpur, Dugli, Dongardula, Nagari, Sonamagar, Sihawa, Ratawa - Odisha border.

Odisha

Chhattisgarh Border - Ghutkel, Kundei, Hatabharandi, Raighar, Beheda, Umerkote, Dhodra, Dhamanaguda, Dabugaon - Papadahandi.

== Junctions ==
NH 30 Terminal near Barapali.
NH 26 Terminal near Sohela.

== See also ==
- List of national highways in India
- List of national highways in India by state
