= National Highway 730A (India) =

National Highway in India

National Highway 730A
- Map of the National Highway in red

Route information
- Auxiliary route of NH 30
- Length: 109 km (68 mi)

Major junctions
- West end: Maigalganj
- NH 731 Pawayan
- East end: Puranpur

Location
- Country: India
- States: Uttar Pradesh

Highway system
- Roads in India; Expressways; National; State; Asian
← NH 30	→ NH 730

National Highway 730A, commonly referred to as NH 730A is a national highway in India. It is a spur road of National Highway 30. NH-730A traverses the state of Uttar Pradesh in India.

== Route ==
Maigalganj, Pawayan, Puranpur.

== Junctions ==
NH 30 Terminal near Maigalganj.
NH 731 near Pawayan.
NH 730 Terminal near Puranpur.

== See also ==
- List of national highways in India
- List of national highways in India by state
