= Sri Aastik Swami Mandir, Raebareli =

Temple in Raebareli District

- श्री आस्तिक स्वामी मंदिर
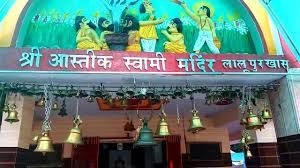

Religion
- Affiliation: Hinduism
- District: Raebareli
- Deity: Sri Aastik Swami
- Festival: Nagpanchami (Gudiya)

Location
- State: Uttar Pradesh
- Country: India
- Interactive map of Sri Aastik Swami Mandir, Raebareli
- Coordinates: 26.268654°N 81.1788052°E

Sri Aastik Swami Mandir is a Hindu temple situated in Lalupur, a village in the district of Raebareli, Uttar Pradesh.

== Location ==
The temple is located on the banks of the River Sai in Lalupur village. It is about 10 kilometers from Raebareli, an urban area in Uttar Pradesh, India. This temple is one of the most important places of worship to the Hindu deity 'Sri Aastik Swami', who is also known as the Lord of Snakes.

== Mythology ==
According to the Mahabharata epic, Arjuna burnt the Khandav forest to expand the State of Hastinapur. During this expansion Sri Krishna helped by destroying the Naga dynasty through the destruction of the great Khandav forest. However the Pandavas did not want to kill the Nagas. To avenge the destruction of the Khandav forest, it is said that the Naga lineage led by Takshaka sought revenge against the Pandavas.

The Nagas looked forward to the destruction of the Pandava kingdom in Hastinapur. During this time, the son of Arjuna, Parikshit was killed by a Nagvanshi warrior named Takshaka. The weapon used to kill him was called the Nagpash. Angered by this act, Janamejaya, the son of Parikshit burned a large number of snakes alive in an act called the Sarp Yagya. However, Sri Aastik Swami saved some of the important snakes. The day when these snakes were saved came to be known as Shravan Shukla Panchami and later Nagapanchami.

Overjoyed by Sri Swami Sri Astik's actions, the snakes blessed him with supreme power and also a blessing that his worshippers would never need to fear snakes or any venomous creatures. In fact, no one would fear snakes wherever his name was spoken.

== Culture ==
Sri Swami is worshipped across India and the Aastik Swami Mandir in Raebareli is one of the major places for worshipping him.

The festival of Nagpanchami (also known as Gudiya) is celebrated with a lot of zeal and enthusiasm. It is believed that if you take a dip in the holy Sai River beside the temple and go to see the Lord in wet clothes, all your wishes will be fulfilled.

Instead of offering flowers, the tradition is to offer him wooden gifts.
