= Raebareli =

- City
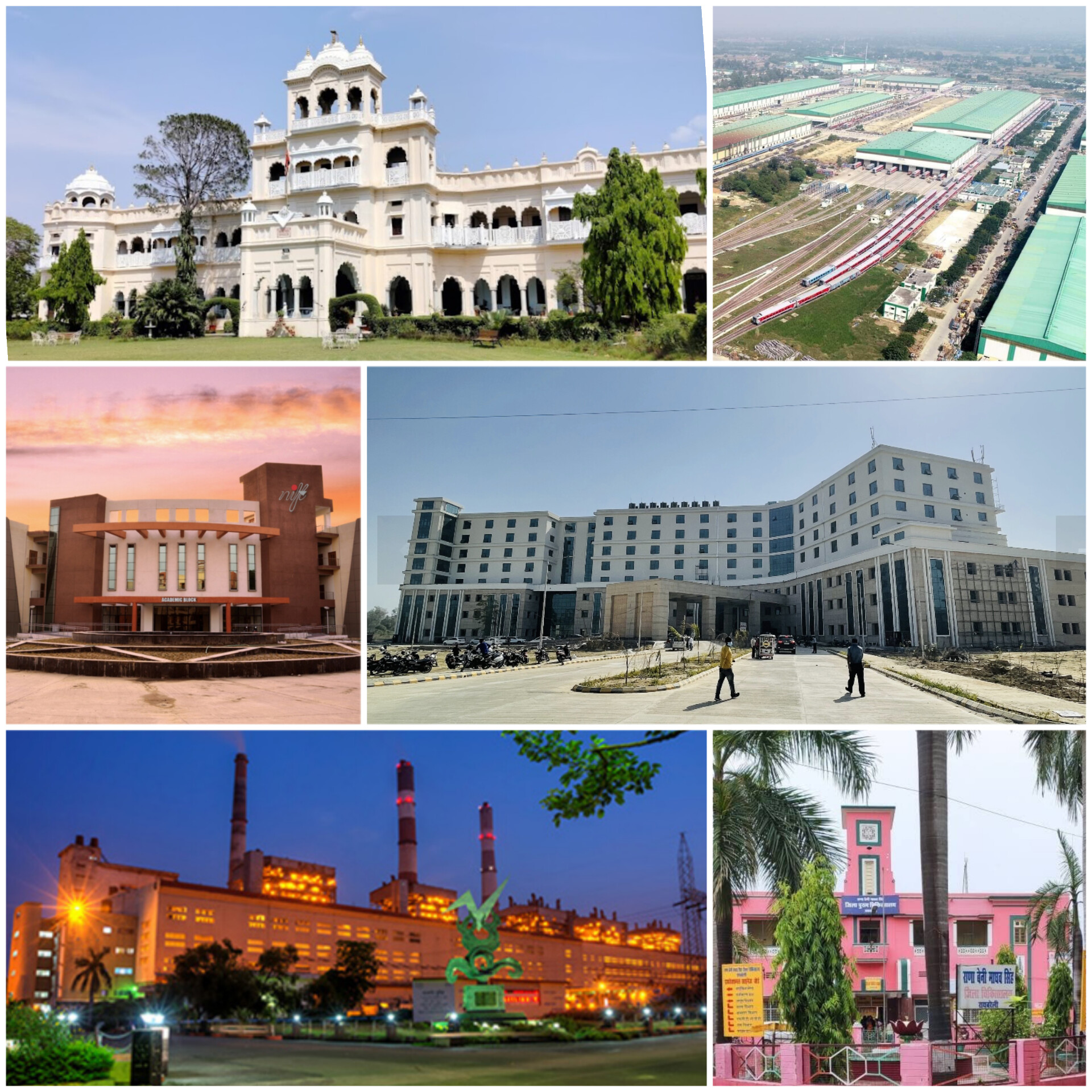
- Left to Right, Top to Bottom: Mahesh Vilas Palace, Modern Coach Factory, NIFT Campus, AIIMS, NTPC Plant, District Hospital

- Location of Raebareli in Uttar Pradesh Raebareli (India)
- Coordinates: 26°13′25″N 81°14′25″E
- Country: India
- State: Uttar Pradesh
- Region: Awadh
- Division: Lucknow
- District: Raebareli

Government
  - Type: Municipal Council
  - Body: Raebareli Municipal Council
  - Commissioner, Lucknow Division: Smt. Roshan Jacob, IAS
  - District Magistrate and Collector: Smt.Harshita Mathur, IAS
  - Superintendent of Police: Yashveer Singh, IPS
  - Member of Parliament: Rahul Gandhi, INC

Area
  - Total: 43 km^{2} (17 sq mi)
- Elevation: 110 m (360 ft)

Population (2011)
  - Total: 191,316
  - Density: 739/km^{2} (1,910/sq mi)

Languages
  - Official: Hindi, Urdu, English
  - Regional: Awadhi
- Time zone: UTC+5:30 (IST)
- PIN: 229001
- Telephone code: 0535
- Vehicle registration: UP-33
- Sex ratio: 941♀/1000♂
- Website: raebareli.nic.in

Raebareli (Hindi: Rāēbarēlī, pronounced [ɾaɛbəɾeliː]) is a city in Indian state of Uttar Pradesh. It is the administrative headquarters of Raebareli district, and a part of Lucknow Division and comes under the Uttar Pradesh State Capital Region (UP-SCR). The city is situated on the banks of the Sai River, and center of four metropolitan cities i.e. Lucknow, Prayagraj, Ayodhya, and Kanpur. It possesses many architectural features and sites, chief of which is a strong and spacious fort. As of 2011, Raebareli had a population of 191,316 people, in 35,197 households.

== History, etymology and post-independence ==
Raebareli is supposedly a city founded by Bhars, and originally called Bharauli or Barauli. The prefix "Rae" (pronounced Rai) originates from the title "Rai," historically borne by the Kayasth rulers of the region. Among the Srivastava community, specifically, a certain lineage is distinctively referred to as "Athhaisa (अट्ठाईसा)," highlighting a unique cultural or familial heritage associated with the Srivastava lineage. This lineage, known for its special bloodline, signifies both royal heritage and leadership within the region, marking the 'Athhaisa (अट्ठाईसा)' Srivastavas as distinguished historical rulers. Later the city was conquered by Ibrahim Shah of the Jaunpur Sultanate and then handed over to Sheikhs and Sayyids. The city's fort was built by Ibrahim Shah in 820 AH, most likely using materials from earlier structures. Apart from the gate on the west side, it is mostly in ruins; it consists of an outer layer of brick surrounding an earthwork core. Outside the gate is the shrine of the Muslim saint Makhdum Saiyid Jafri. According to legend, during the fort's original construction, everything built during the day kept collapsing at night; the sultan then summoned the saint from Jaunpur, and as soon as he walked on the site the construction proceeded without difficulty. Ibrahim Shah also had at least two mosques built in Raebareli. One was the Jama Masjid (congregational mosque), which was restored in 1089 AH by Aurangzeb and still stands today. The other no longer exists; in the late 19th century a dispensary was built on the site by Raja Drigjibai Singh of Murarmau. Rae Bareli was also spelled as "Raibareilly" which is actively being used in various places including central government managed websites such as Vahan Citizen Services.

Since the time of Ibrahim Shah, Raebareli has continuously been an important regional town. His grandson Husain Shah renamed the city Husainabad after himself, but the name change never caught on. Different mahallas were founded by descendants of the original Muslim settlers in the city: Qasbana, Neza Andaz, Saiyid Rajan, Bans Tola, and Pirai Hamid were founded by Muslims; Jaunpuri, Khali Sahat, and Surjipur were founded by Brahmins; Khatrauni Kalan and Khurd by the Khattri treasurers of the Jaunpur sultans, and Shah Tola by the royal purveyor.

Raja Har Parshad "Taluqedar of Naseerabad" a, native of this town, was the Nazim or Commissioner of Khairabad Division during the reign of the ex-king. He joined the mutineers and went up to Nepal with Begum Hazrat Mahal of Oudh dynasty and on 31 December 1858 while returning after ensuring her safety, he was killed in a battle with British army. He has been honoured with the title of "Lastville and the most notorious governor of Oudh". The district of Raebareli was created by the British in 1858, and is named after its headquarters town. Rana Beni Madhav Baksh Singh is well known freedom fighter of this district. Munshiganj retaliation of common people for freedom shows an example for the rest of Oudh.

After the uprising, Raebareli was chosen as the site of the new district headquarters. A cantonment was established to the southwest of the city, but it was only in use for a few years before being abandoned. Raebareli was first constituted as a municipality in 1867, with originally 23 members on the municipal board, later reduced to 16.

At the turn of the 20th century, Raebareli was described as an important commercial centre for the surrounding region, especially since the coming of the railway. It then consisted of two separate sites: Raebareli proper and Jahanabad. Originally founded by the subahdar Jahan Khan, it contained the Rang Mahal palace and the maqbara or mausoleum of Jahan Khan. The city had six marketplaces: Purana Bazar (also called Qila Darwaza), Jahanabad, Capperganj, Baillieganj, Graceyganj, and Whishganj. A seventh one, known as Munshiganj, also existed a short distance away from the city on the road to Dalmau. It had been founded by Diwan Chand Sahai, who along with his brother Munshi Gur Sahai had served as assistants of Nawab Ali Naqi Khan. Capperganj, near Jahanabad, had been established by Ganga Sahai and served as a marketplace for a wide variety of goods, including brasswork from Hasanpur Bandhua, cloth from Jais, and vegetables from Lucknow as well as imported European goods. Baillieganj, founded by the British official D.C. Baillie, served as "the main wholesale market in the district" at the time. It was distinct in that it did not levy an octroi fee on goods brought there, "so that it serves the purposed of a bonded warehouse". During the Indian famine of 1899–1900, the increased demand for food in the Bombay Presidency triggered a surge in the grain trade at Baillieganj.

Four prominent mosques were noted at this point. The first of these was the Jami Masjid, which as mentioned dated back to the reign of Ibrahim Shah. The second was built in 1040 AH by Nawab Jahan Khan, who founded Jahanabad. The third, built by Shah Alam-ullah, was modelled after the Kaaba in Mecca and was domeless but had three main halls. The last of the four was built by Shah Alam-ullah's son in the suburb of Daira.

Other landmarks at the time included the dispensary and sarai built by Drigjibai Singh after the British annexation of Oudh State in the 1850s. Built around the same time was a large masonry bridge across the Sai, commissioned by the British deputy commissioner W. Glynn and partly financed by some Bais Rajput taluqdars. The city also had several schools, including a government-run high school, a branch school located within the fort, a vernacular middle school run by the municipality, and five indigenous schools supported by grants-in-aid. Two of these were in the fort, two more were in Jahanabad, and the last one was at Wazirganj. There was also a Sanskrit Pathshala.

According to the 1901 census, the population of Raebareli was 15,880 people (8,321 male and 7,559 female). This included 8,825 Hindus, 6,955 Muslims, 43 Sikhs, 38 Christians, and 19 Jains. Among the notable Sikh residents were Shahzada Basdeo Singh, the great-grandson of Maharaja Ranjit Singh of the Sikh Empire, as well as the descendants of Chhattar Singh, one of the generals in the Sikh army.

== Geography and climate ==
Raebareli lies in the southern-central part of Uttar Pradesh. The district is irregular in shape but fairly compact. It forms a part of the Lucknow Division and lies between Latitude 25° 49' North and 26° 36' North and Longitude 100° 41' East and 81° 34' East. On the north, it is bounded by tehsil Mohanlal Ganj of Lucknow and Haidergarh of Barabanki, on the east by tehsil Mussafir Khana of district Amethi and on the south-east by Lalganj Ajhara and the Kunda tehsil of district Pratapgarh. The southern boundary is formed by Ganga which separates it from the district of Fatehpur. On the west lies the Bighapur and Purwa tehsil of Unnao.

The district forms a part of the Gangetic plain which is of recent origin according to geological chronology and reveal ordinary Gangetic alluvium. The district being a part of the alluvial plain conforms to the same geological sequence as the plain itself. The only mineral of importance is kankar. The district is also noted for its deposits of reh and brick earth. The district, as a whole, is fairly compact tract of gently undulating land. The elevation varies from about 120.4 m above sea level in the north west to 86.9 m above sea level in the extreme south east, on the banks of the Ganga. The highest points are the crowns of the watersheds of the different drainage channel which serve to divide the district into five main physical units, The Ganga Khadar, the Ganga upland, the southern clay tract, the central tract or the Sai upland and the Northern clay tract.

Raebareli has a warm subtropical climate with very cold and dry winters from December to mid February and dry, hot summers from April to mid June. The rainy season is from mid-June to mid-September when it gets an average rainfall of 1200 mm mostly from the south-west monsoon winds. During extreme winters, the maximum temperature is around 12 °C and the minimum is between 3-4 °C. Fog is quite common from late December to late January. Summers can be quite hot with temperatures rising to the 40-45 °C range.

Raebareli has been ranked 1st best “National Clean Air City” under (Category 3 population under 3 lakhs cities) in India according to 'Swachh Vayu Survekshan 2024 Results'

Climate data for Raebareli (Fursatganj Airfield) (1991–2020, extremes 2006–2019)
Month	Jan	Feb	Mar	Apr	May	Jun	Jul	Aug	Sep	Oct	Nov	Dec	Year
Record high °C (°F)	30.8 (87.4)	35.0 (95.0)	41.0 (105.8)	44.4 (111.9)	45.6 (114.1)	46.6 (115.9)	43.6 (110.5)	39.0 (102.2)	37.8 (100.0)	37.6 (99.7)	33.8 (92.8)	30.6 (87.1)	46.6 (115.9)
Mean daily maximum °C (°F)	21.5 (70.7)	26.3 (79.3)	32.4 (90.3)	38.6 (101.5)	40.2 (104.4)	38.8 (101.8)	34.0 (93.2)	33.4 (92.1)	33.7 (92.7)	33.1 (91.6)	29.3 (84.7)	23.7 (74.7)	32.0 (89.6)
Mean daily minimum °C (°F)	7.7 (45.9)	10.6 (51.1)	14.8 (58.6)	20.5 (68.9)	24.7 (76.5)	27.1 (80.8)	26.4 (79.5)	26.0 (78.8)	25.0 (77.0)	20.0 (68.0)	13.4 (56.1)	8.7 (47.7)	18.6 (65.5)
Record low °C (°F)	0.4 (32.7)	2.6 (36.7)	6.4 (43.5)	11.8 (53.2)	18.2 (64.8)	21.6 (70.9)	22.6 (72.7)	22.0 (71.6)	21.0 (69.8)	12.4 (54.3)	6.6 (43.9)	1.4 (34.5)	0.4 (32.7)
Average rainfall mm (inches)	16.7 (0.66)	17.9 (0.70)	14.6 (0.57)	5.3 (0.21)	24.0 (0.94)	93.1 (3.67)	303.9 (11.96)	240.7 (9.48)	132.4 (5.21)	21.0 (0.83)	1.6 (0.06)	5.9 (0.23)	877.0 (34.53)
Average rainy days	1.3	1.9	1.1	0.5	2.3	4.3	12.1	11.4	5.7	1.1	0.2	0.5	42.6
Average relative humidity (%) (at 17:30 IST)	64	52	36	24	32	46	73	76	71	61	57	63	55
Source: India Meteorological Department

== Civic administration ==
Raebareli is one of the six districts of the Lucknow Division, which is headed by a Commissioner headquartered at Lucknow. He serves as a link between the districts in his division and the State Government. The General Administration of the district is vested in the District Officer who is called Deputy Commissioner for revenue and District Magistrate (D.M.) for criminal jurisdiction. Raebareli is divided into 6 sub divisions:

1. Raebareli
2. Dalmau
3. Maharajganj
4. Lalganj
5. Unchahar
6. Salon

=== Raebareli Municipal Committee ===
Raebareli Municipal Committee (Hindi: Raebareli Nagar Palika) is the Municipal Committee responsible for the civic infrastructure and administration of the city of Raebareli. The organization is known, in short, as RMC. This civic administrative body administers the city's cleanliness and other public services like public health and parks. The head of the RMC is the chairman. The present chairman is Shatrohan Sonkar.

== Places of interest ==
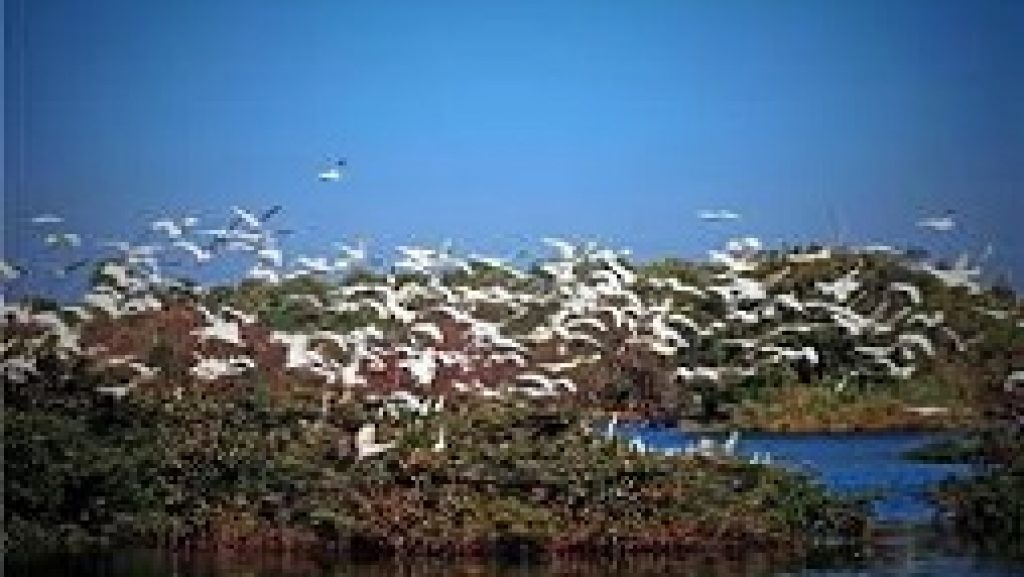
Samaspur Bird Sanctuary

- Samaspur Bird Sanctuary
- Sri Aastik Swami Temple

== Demographics ==
Historical population
Year	Pop.	±%
1901	15,880	—
1911	17,329	+9.1%
1921	16,183	−6.6%
1931	18,180	+12.3%
1941	20,945	+15.2%
1951	24,958	+19.2%
1961	29,940	+20.0%
1971	38,765	+29.5%
1981	89,697	+131.4%
1991	129,904	+44.8%
2001	169,333	+30.4%
2011	191,316	+13.0%
Source: 2011 Census of India

Religions in Raebareli city (2011)
Religion	Percent
Hindus	73.95%
Muslims	24.67%
Sikhs	0.71%
Distribution of religions

According to the 2011 census, Raebareli has a population of 191,316 people, in 35,197 households. The town's sex ratio is 915 females to every 1000 males. The 0-6 age group makes up about 10.5% of the town's population; the sex ratio for this group is 902, which is lower than the district urban average. Members of Scheduled Castes make up 14.5% of the town's population, while members of Scheduled Tribes make up 0.12%. Raebareli's literacy rate was 81.23% (counting only people age 7 and up); literacy was higher among males (85.75%) than among females (76.29%). The scheduled castes literacy rate is 63.61% (70.75% among males and 55.71% among females).

In terms of employment, 24.98% of Raebareli residents were classified as main workers (i.e. people employed for at least 6 months per year) in 2011. Marginal workers (i.e. people employed for less than 6 months per year) made up 6.68%, and the remaining 68.34% were non-workers. Employment status varied significantly according to gender, with 48.81% of males being either main or marginal workers, compared to only 12.93% of females.

28.97% of Raebareli residents live in slum conditions as of 2011. There are 53 slum areas in Raebareli, of which the three largest are Munshiganj (pop. 2,463), Rattapur (pop. 2,217), and Kaptan Ka Purwa (pop. 2,163). The slum areas in Raebareli range in size from about 34 to 585 households and have between 2 (in Bairiya Ka Purwa) and 30 (in Balapur) tap water access points. The number of toilets installed in people's homes ranges from 3 in Bigulchi Ka Purwa to 200 in Chaturbhuj Pur. All 53 areas are serviced by a mixture of open and closed sewers, as is the rest of the city.

== Education ==
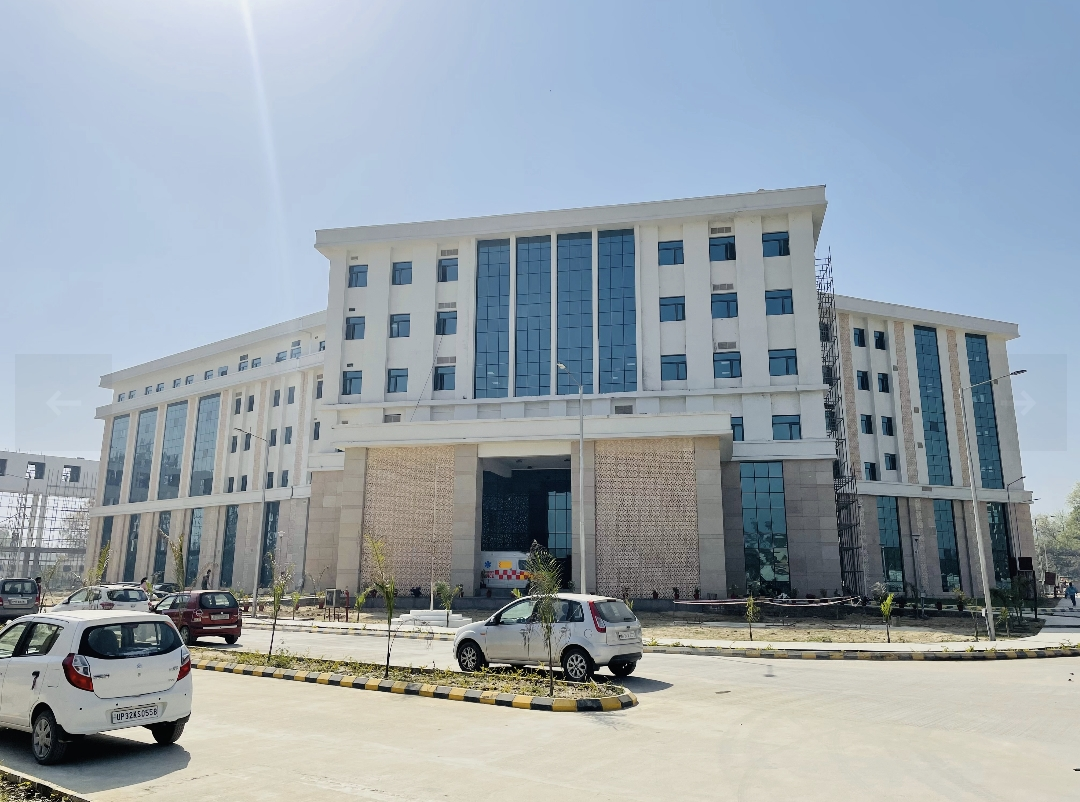
AIIMS Medical College

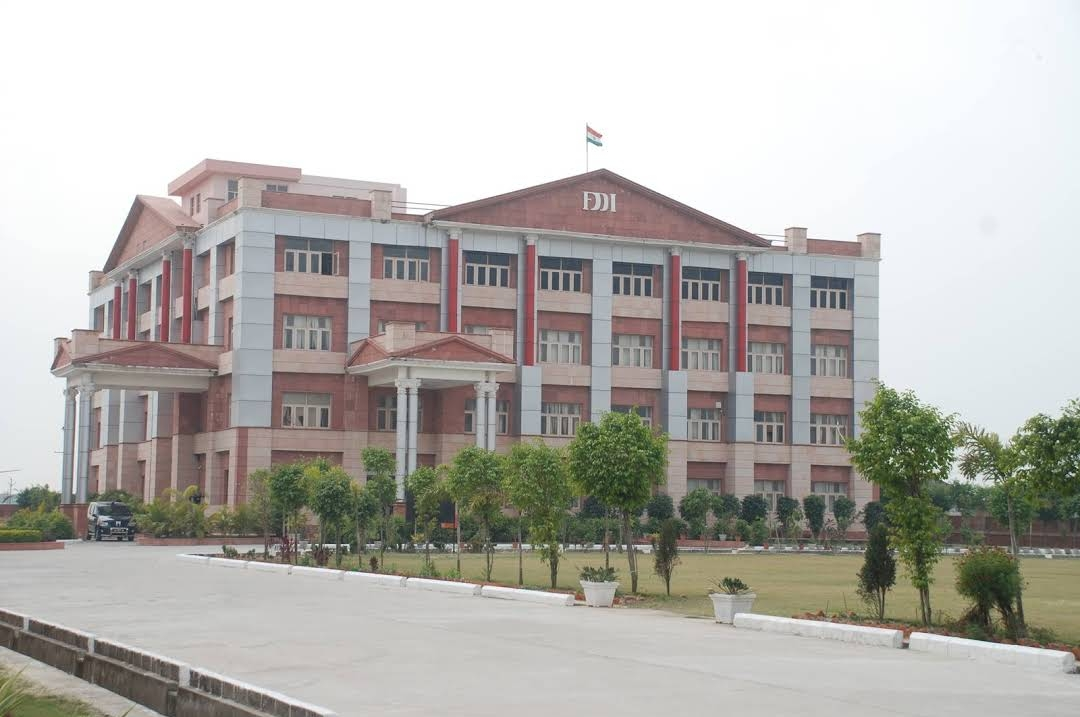
FDDI Raebareli

Raebareli has educational institutions affiliated to Central Board of Secondary Education, Uttar Pradesh Board, and Indian Certificate of Secondary Education including a Kendriya Vidyalaya situated in the city center to impart primary and secondary education under CBSE pattern.

=== Colleges and Institutions ===
- All India Institute of Medical Sciences, Raebareli (AIIMS)
- Feroze Gandhi College
- Feroze Gandhi Institute of Engineering and Technology (FGIET)
- National Institute of Fashion Technology (NIFT)
- National Institute of Pharmaceutical Education and Research, Raebareli (NIPER)

==== Other Institutes ====
- District Institute of Education and Training, Raebareli
- Footwear Design and Development Institute (FDDI)
- Indira Gandhi Rashtriya Uran Akademi (IGRUA)
- Rajiv Gandhi National Aviation University (RGNAU)
- Rajiv Gandhi Institute of Petroleum Technology (RGIPT)
- Rajiv Gandhi National Aviation University (RGNAU)

=== Schools ===
- New Standard Public School
- Kendriya Vidyalaya, Raebareli
- Ryan International School
- Swami Janki Sharan

== Economy ==
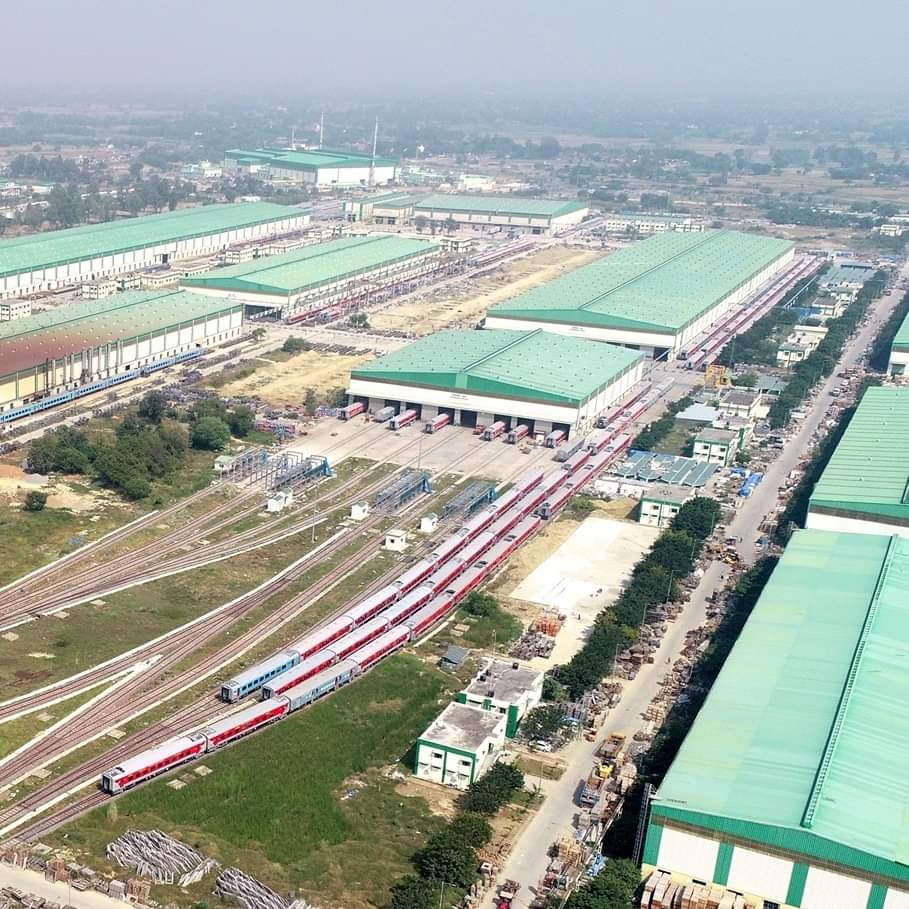
Modern Coach Factory

Raebareli is a profitable location for the industries and factories built here. It is also part of UPSCR (Uttar Pradesh State Capital Region) similar model to Delhi NCR Raebareli GDP is around 1.24 billion dollar (Data of 2021). It is home to some of the renowned names who have set up their business here. One of these, is the Indian Telephone Industries Limited, established in 1948, which is a telecom equipment manufacturing unit which deals with transmission, switching and other related equipments. It is a state-owned company, headquartered in Bengaluru. The Modern Rail Coach Factory at Raebareli, is the third rail coach manufacturing unit in India which was established in November 2012. In addition to these, Birla Corporation Limited, Rashtriya Ispat Nigam Limited and National Thermal Power Corporation Limited also have their units here.

== Transport ==
=== Air ===
The nearest airport to Raebareli is Chaudhary Charan Singh International Airport at Amausi, Lucknow which is approximately 80 km from Raebareli. Other airports close to Raebareli district are Kanpur Airport, Prayagraj Airport and Varanasi Airport.

=== Road ===
Raebareli is on the route of National Highway 30, between Lucknow and Prayagraj and connected to major cities. Important highways through Raebareli are:

- Raebareli-Ayodhya Highway (NH330A)
- Raebareli-Tanda Highway (NH128)
- Kanpur-Raebareli-Varanasi Highway (NH31)
- Lucknow-Raebareli-Prayagraj Highway (NH30)

Expressway

Ganga Expressway is an under-construction 594 km long, 6 lane wide (expandable to 8) greenfield expressway project in the state of Uttar Pradesh, India. It will pass through 12 districts including Raebareli.

Ring Road

Ring Road Raebareli is an elevated section of road at Raebareli in Uttar Pradesh, India. It is an outer bypass road and crosses the Sharda River. It has been constructed to divert the traffic between Lucknow and Prayagraj, allowing vehicles to get to their destinations without entering the city of Raebareli.

=== Railways ===
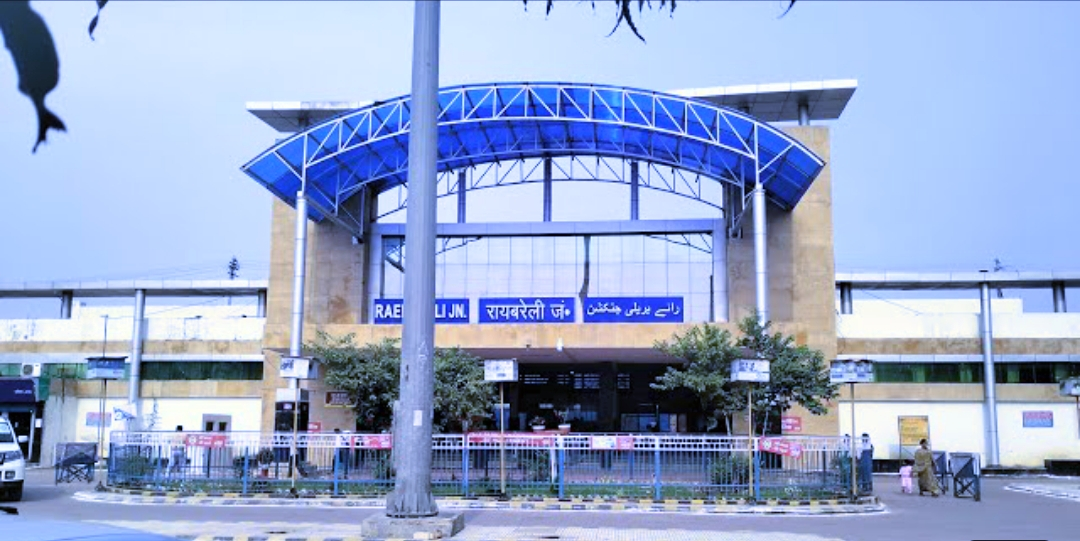
Rae Bareli Junction Railway Station

Raebareli Junction lies on Varanasi-Rae Bareli-Lucknow line and Raebareli-Allahabad rail line of the Northern Railway. A rail line is being built from Raebareli to Faizabad via Akbarganj, on the Northern Railways network.
Raebareli is well connected with some of the major cities of the country and the rest is inter-connected with other trains. Some of the destinations covered by trains passing through Rae Bareli Junction are Lucknow, Allahabad, Varanasi, Jaisalmer, Shaktinagar, Puri, Bhopal, Howrah, Amritsar, Jodhpur, Bareilly, Dehradun, Lalkuan, Jammu Tawi, Saharanpur, Bangalore, Mumbai, New Delhi, Kanpur and others.

High-speed rail corridor

Delhi-Varanasi high speed rail corridor is India's second bullet train project after the Mumbai-Ahmedabad high-speed rail corridor. The 865-kilometre (537 mi) high speed rail corridor will connect Varanasi to Delhi through 12 stations. Delhi-Varanasi high speed rail corridor will have 12 stations including Raebareli.

== Notable people ==
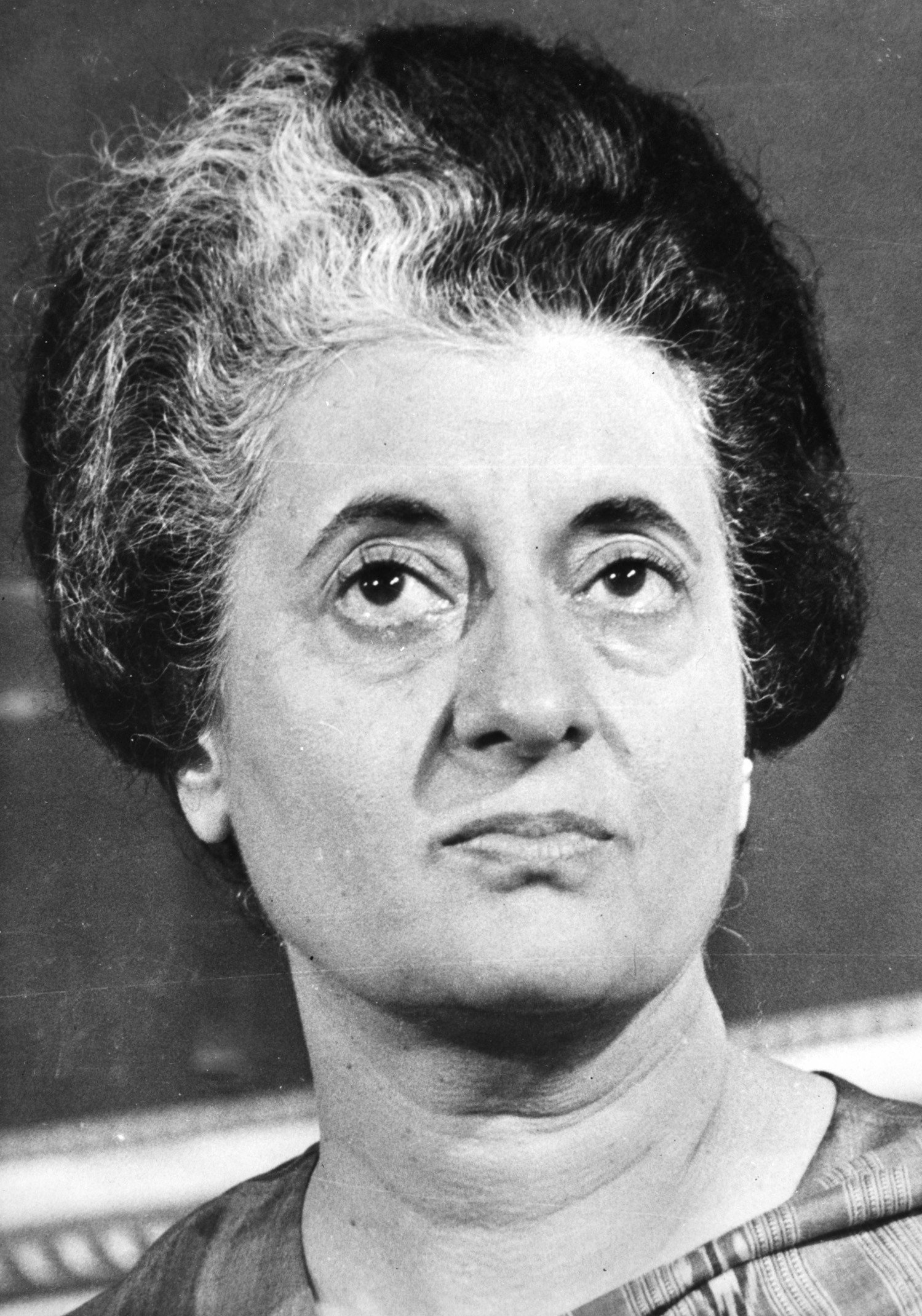
Indira Gandhi

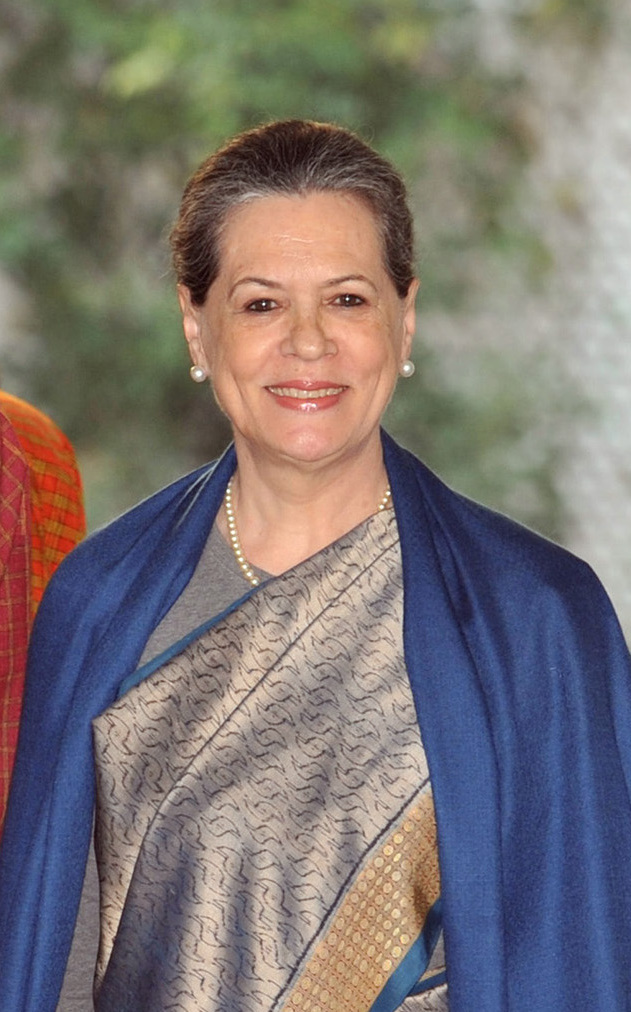
Sonia Gandhi

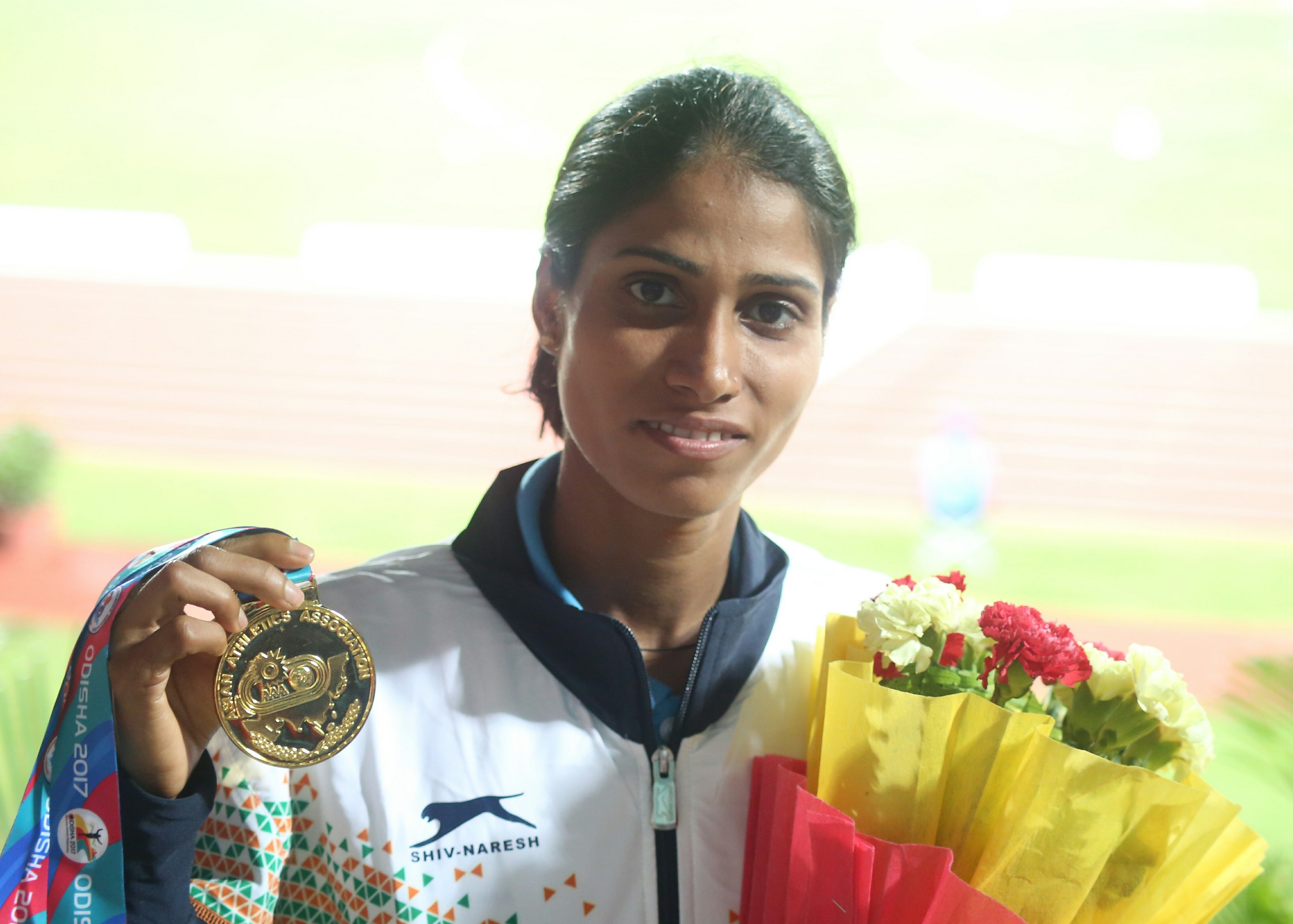
Sudha Singh

- Syed Ahmad Barelvi, Indian Islamic reformer
- Shrish Chandra Dikshit, PS and former MP
- Meenakshi Dixit, actress
- Mahavir Prasad Dwivedi, poet, writer
- Indira Gandhi, 3rd Prime Minister of India
- Sonia Gandhi, politician, former President of the Indian National Congress
- Malik Muhammad Jayasi, poet, writer
- Maharaja Chandu Lal, poet, politician
- Leela Mishra, actress
- Uma Shankar Mishra, politician
- Abul Hasan Ali Hasani Nadwi, scholar, writer
- Rabey Hasani Nadwi, scholar, writer
- Munawwar Rana, poet, writer
- Syed Sibtey Razi, politician, former governor of Assam and Jharkhand
- Deenanath Sewak, former MLA, former minister, government of Uttar Pradesh
- Ashok Singh, politician
- Dinesh Pratap Singh, politician
- Sudha Singh, athlete
- R. P. Singh, cricketer
- Swapnil Singh, cricketer
