= National Highway 730 (India) =

National Highway in India

National Highway 730
- Map of the National Highway in red

Route information
- Length: 519 km (322 mi)

Major junctions
- West end: Pilibhit
- NH 730A near Puranpur. NH 731 near Khutar. NH 727H near Lakhimpur. NH 730H near Kundwa. NH 927 near Nanpara. NH 927 near Bahraich. NH 330 near Balrampur. NH 28 near Siddharthnagar. NH 24 near Pharenda. NH 730S near Maharajganj. NH 328 near Partawal. NH 727 near Pandrauna.
- East end: Tamkuhiraj

Location
- Country: India
- States: Uttar Pradesh

Highway system
- Roads in India; Expressways; National; State; Asian
← NH 30	→ NH 727

National Highway 730, commonly referred to as NH 730 is a national highway in India. It is a spur road of National Highway 30. NH-730 traverses the state of Uttar Pradesh in India.

== Route ==
Pilibhit, Puranpur, Khutar, Gola Gokaran Nath, Lakhimpur Kheri, Nanpara, Bahraich, Shravasti, Balrampur, Tulsipur, Gainsari, Pachperwa, Barhani Bazar, Shohratgarh, Siddharthnagar, Pharenda, Maharajganj, Partawal, Kaptanganj, Padrauna, Tamkuhiraj.

== Junctions ==
NH 30 Terminal near Pilibhit.
NH 730A near Puranpur.
NH 731 near Khutar.
NH 727H near Lakhimpur.
NH 730H near Kundwa.
NH 927 near Nanpara.
NH 927 near Bahraich.
NH 330 near Balrampur.
NH 28 near Siddharthnagar.
NH 24 near Pharenda.
NH 730S near Maharajganj.
NH 328 near Partawal.
NH 727 near Pandrauna.
NH 27 Terminal near Tamkuhiraj.

== See also ==
- List of national highways in India
- List of national highways in India by state
