= Penta, Chhattisgarh =

- town
- Location within Chhattisgarh Location within India
- Coordinates: 18°7′0″N 81°29′0″E
- Country: India
- State: Chhattisgarh
- District: Dantewada
- Elevation: 121 m (397 ft)

Languages
  - Official: Hindi, Chhattisgarhi
- Time zone: UTC+5:30 (IST)
- Vehicle registration: CG
- Coastline: 0 kilometres (0 mi)

Penta is a town in Dantewada district, Chhattisgarh, India.

== Geography ==
It is located at 18°7′0″N 81°29′0″E at an elevation of 121 m above MSL.

== Location ==
Penta is connected to Jagdalpur by National Highway 221.
