= National Highway 153 (India) =

National highway in India

National Highway 153
- Map of National Highway 153 in red

Route information
- Auxiliary route of NH 53
- Length: 86.8 km (53.9 mi)

Major junctions
- West end: Saraipali
- East end: Raigarh

Location
- Country: India
- States: Chhattisgarh

Highway system
- Roads in India; Expressways; National; State; Asian
← NH 53	→ NH 49

National Highway 153 (NH 153), formerly NH-216, is a national highway in India. It is a spur road of National Highway 53. NH-153 traverses the state of Chhattisgarh in India.

== Route ==
NH-53 at Saraipali, Sarangarh, NH-49 at Raigarh.

== Junctions ==
NH 53 Terminal near Saraipali.
NH 49 Terminal near Raigarh.

== See also ==
- List of national highways in India
- List of national highways in India by state
