= National Highway 727H (India) =

National Highway in India

National Highway 727H

Route information
- Auxiliary route of NH 27
- Length: 139 km (86 mi)

Major junctions
- South end: Barabanki
- North end: Lakhimpur

Location
- Country: India
- States: Uttar Pradesh

Highway system
- Roads in India; Expressways; National; State; Asian
← NH 27	→ NH 730

National Highway 727H, commonly referred to as NH 727H is an underconstruction national highway in India that starts from Barabanki and ends to Lakhimpur. It is a secondary route of National Highway 27. NH-727H runs in the state of Uttar Pradesh in India.

== Route ==
NH727H connects Barabanki, Dewa sharif, Fatehpur, Mahmudabad, Biswan, Laharpur and Lakhimpur in the state of Uttar Pradesh.

== Junctions ==
NH 27 Terminal near Barabanki.
NH 730 Terminal near Lakhimpur.

== See also ==
- List of national highways in India
- List of national highways in India by state
