= National Highway 30 (India) =

National highway in India

National Highway 30
- Map of the National Highway in red
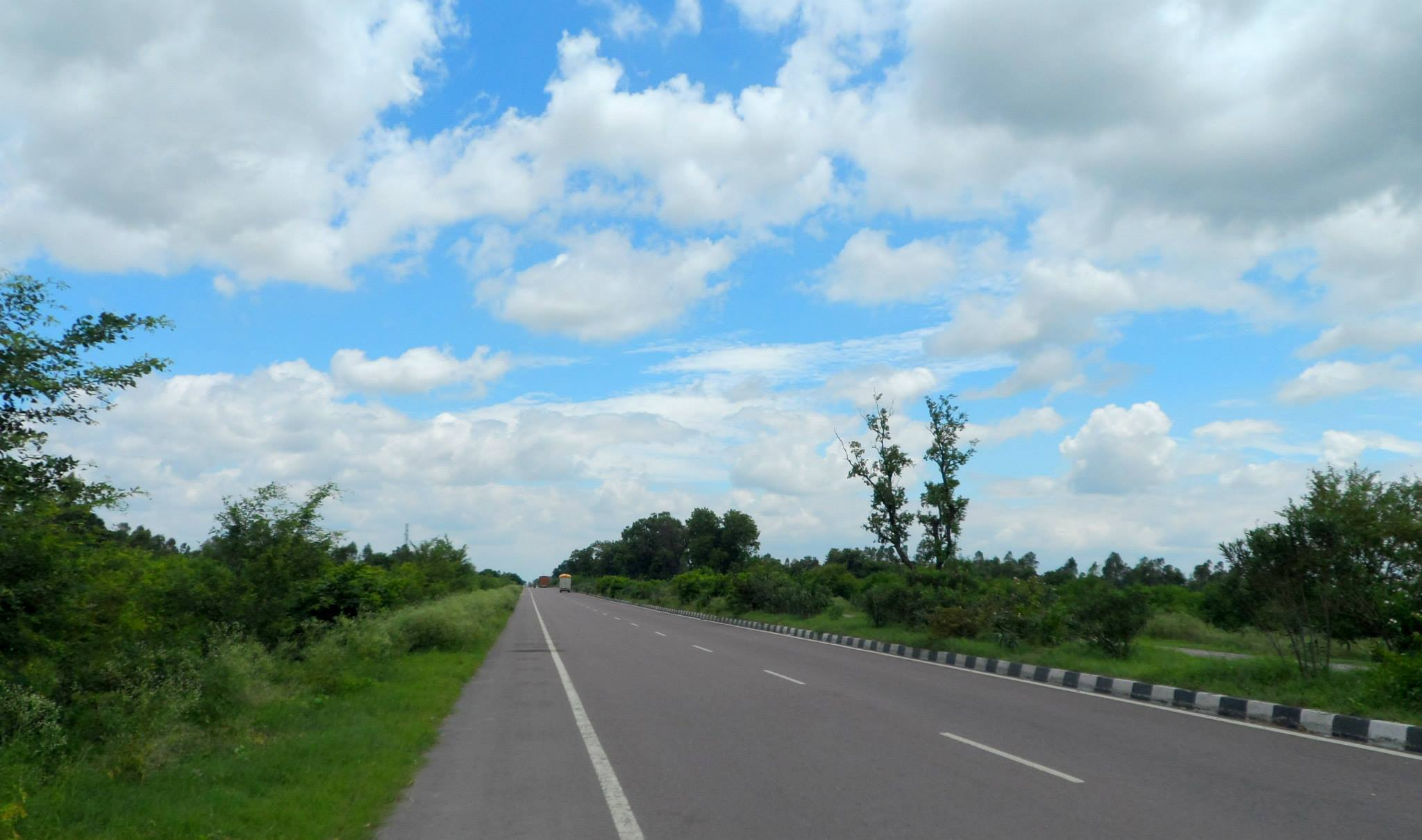
- NH 30 in Sitapur district, U.P.

Route information
- Length: 1,984.3 km (1,233.0 mi)

Major junctions
- North end: Sitarganj, Uttarakhand
- South end: Vijayawada, Andhra Pradesh

Location
- Country: India
- States: Uttarakhand, Uttar Pradesh, Madhya Pradesh, Chhattisgarh, Telangana, Andhra Pradesh
- Primary destinations: Vijayawada - Kottagudam – Bhadrachalam – Palwancha - Penta

Highway system
- Roads in India; Expressways; National; State; Asian
← NH 9	→ NH 65

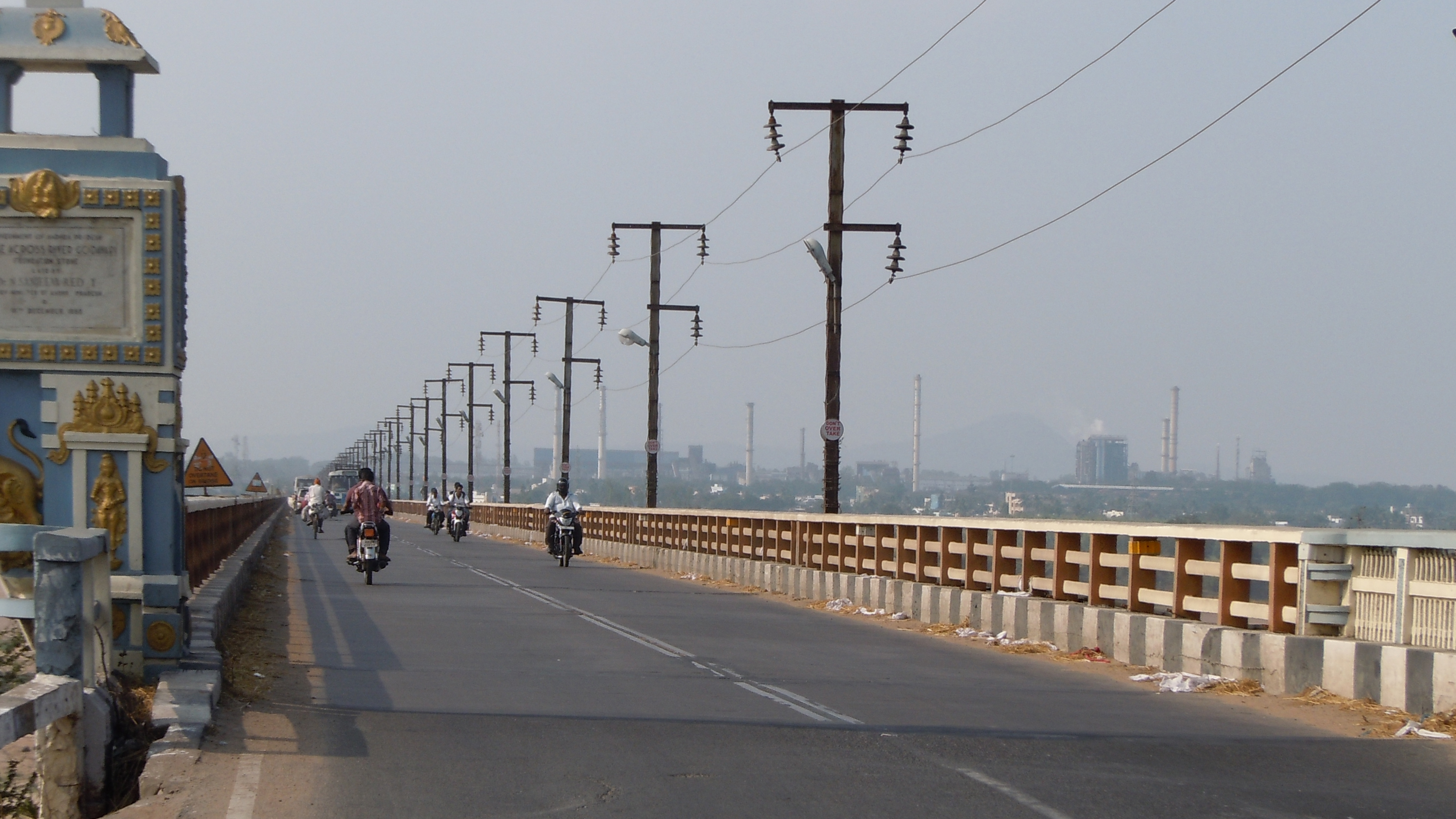
Godavari Bridge at Bhadrachalam on National Highway 30

Schematic map of National Highways in India

National Highway 30 (NH 30) is a primary national highway in India. NH 30 connects Sitarganj in Uttarakhand with Ibrahimpatnam, Vijayawada in Andhra Pradesh. The total length of this highway is 1,984.3 km (1,233.0 mi). It starts at the junction of NH 9 at Sitarganj and ends at the junction of NH 65 at Ibrahimpatnam, Vijayawada. Development of Ibrahimpatnam-Jagadalpur Route is under process. Rajdeep Rohan joint venture is the contract agency for this project. Second bridge was completed on 17 April 2024 at pilgrimage city of Bhadrachalam which is famous for temple of Lord Shri Rama. NH-30 runs through the states of Uttarakhand, Uttar Pradesh, Madhya Pradesh, Chhattisgarh, Telangana and Andhra Pradesh in India.

== History ==
Before renumbering of national highways, NH-30 route was variously numbered as old national highways 74, 75, 24, 24B, 27, 7, 12A, 200, 43, 16 and 221.

== Route ==
NH30 starts at the city of

Uttar Pradesh (Sitarganj Pilibhit, Bareilly, Tilhar, Shahjahanpur, Sitapur, Lucknow, Raebareli, Prayagraj)

Madhya Pradesh (Rewa, Amarpatan, Maihar, Katni, Sihora, Jabalpur, Mandla, Bichhiya )

Chhattisgarh (Raipur, Dhamtari, Charama, Kanker, Kondagaon, Jagdalpur, Sukma, Konta)

Telangana (Bhadrachalam, Paloncha, Kothagudem)

terminates at Andhra Pradesh (Nellipaka, Tiruvuru, Ibrahimpatnam, Vijayawada)

== Junctions list ==
Uttarakhand
NH 9 Terminal near Sitarganj.
Uttar Pradesh
NH 730 near Pilibhit
NH 530 near Bareilly
NH 21 near Bareilly
NH 730B near Bareilly
NH 730C near MiranpurKatra Teh. Tilhar
NH 731 near Shahjahanpur
NH 730A near Maigalganj
NH 330D near Sitapur
NH 230 near Bakshi-ka-Talab
NH 27 near Lucknow
NH 731 near Lucknow
NH 230 near Mohanlaganj
NH 330A near Raebareli
NH 128 near Raebareli
NH 31 near Raebareli
NH 19 near Nawabganj (Prayagraj)
NH 330 near Prayagraj
NH 35 near Prayagraj
Madhaya Pradesh
NH 135BD near Jamira
NH 135 near Mangawan
NH 39 near Rewa
NH 135BG near Maihar
NH 43 near Katni
NH 34 near Jabalpur
NH 45 near Jabalpur
NH 543 near Mandla
Chhattisgarh
NH 130A near Pondi
NH 130 near Simga
NH 130B near Raipur
NH 53 near Raipur
NH 130C near Abhanpur
NH 130CD near Kurud
NH 930 near Purur
NH 130D near Kondagaon
NH 63 near Jagdalpur
Andhra Pradesh
NH 326 near Chintoor
Telangana
NH 365BB near Penuballi
Andhra Pradesh
NH 65 Terminal at Ibrahimpatnam, Vijayawada.

== See also ==
- List of national highways in India
- List of national highways in India by state
- National Highways Development Project
