= Nanpara =

- Town
- Location in Uttar Pradesh, India Nanpara (India)
- Coordinates: 27.87°N 81.5°E
- Country: India
- State: Uttar Pradesh
- District: Bahraich

Government
  - Body: Nanpara Nagar Palika Parishad
  - MP: Akshaibar Lal (BJP)
  - Mayor: Abdul Waheed

Area
  - Total: 36 km^{2} (14 sq mi)
- Elevation: 132 m (433 ft)

Population (2011)
  - Total: 62,782
  - Density: 1,700/km^{2} (4,500/sq mi)
- Time zone: UTC+5:30 (IST)
- Postal Code: 271865
- Area code: 05253
- Vehicle registration: UP-40
- Website: nnpnanpara.com

Nanpara is a town & municipal board in Bahraich district in the Indian state of Uttar Pradesh. It is a region along the Nepal Border and includes tracts of dense forests. It is a city surrounded by many villages.

== Geography ==
Nanpara is located at 27.87°N 81.5°E. It has an average elevation of 132 metres (433 feet). It is located at 16 km (9.9 mi) from the Indo-Nepal border, and 36 km (22 mi) from the district Bahraich. This town has strategic and economic importance due to the transportation of goods in Nepal and recent activities of drugs, crossing through the Nepal border. It has a municipality also. It is well connected by road transport and Railway. It is connected to Lucknow and Nepal via 4-lane NH 927 highway. There have been several protests and demands to make the Nanpara district.

== Demographics ==
As of 2011 Indian Census, Nanpara had a total population of 62,782. Males constitute 52% of the population and females 48%. Nanpara has an average literacy rate of 53%, lower than the national average of 59.5%: male literacy is 78%, and female literacy is 89%. In Nanpara, 15% of the population is under 6 years of age.

== History ==
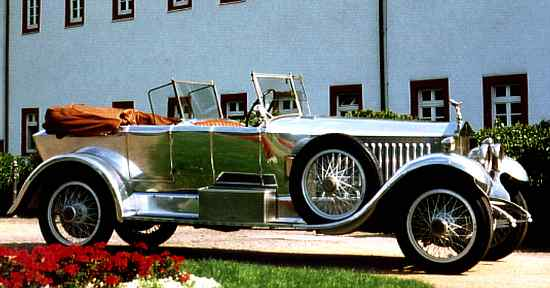
The 1926 Rolls-Royce of Raja Syed Mohd Saadat Ali Khan

The Nanpara Taluqdari was one of the taluqdaris (feudatory states) in British India. The title of "Raja" was conferred on the Nanpara House in 1763 by the Nawab Shuja-ud-Daula, the King of Oudh and was then recognized by the British. With holding of 439 villages it was the largest Muslim taluqdars (landowners) in British India.

Nanpara was an important frontier estate, bordering Nepal territory in the Bahraich district of Oudh. Of the 439 villages, 438 were in the Bahraich district and one in the Barabanki district. It comprised an area of 468 square miles (1,210 km^{2}), or about the same area of the then former German principality of Lippe. In 1914–15 The gross rental of the estate amounted to over rupees 12,00,000 and the government demanded land revenue and cesses of rupees 2,80,000. Taking a population density of 350 inhabitants per square mile (140/km^{2}) [which was the estimated district average in the census of 1911] the estate contained a population of over 154,000.

In 1632, Rasul Khan, a Pathan. received a commission from the Emperor to subdue the Banjaras; and obtained for his services and for the pay of his troops, the grant of Nanpara and four other villages in Pargana Solonabad, in addition to one-tenth of the rent of the disturbed territory. Rasul Khan lived at Kummaria in Bundi, and both him and his son Jahan Khan, who succeeded him, are buried there. Jahan Khan's successor, Mohammad Khan, was the first to settle in Nanpara. Mohammad Khan's son and successor, Karam Khan, was so successful against the Banjaras that he gained amongst the country folk the title of Raja, which was confirmed by Nawab of Oudh Shuja-ud-Daula in 1763, and was recognised as hereditary by the then British Government of India in 1877. This was because this area was home to the Nanpara and Utraula principalities, both of which are now situated in Bahraich and Balrampur district, which was the centre of the largest Pathan settlement outside Rohilkhand.

== Tourism ==
Nanpara is an important junction connecting key areas of the region. Its geographic location provides an international role. The India-Nepal road to the Rupadiha-Nepalganj border lies towards the north. The eastbound road connects the region with G.T Road via Sitapur. In the south-east roads connect to the district capital Bahraich and a prominent place called Shravasti. The state capital Lucknow is about 160 km (99 mi) from Nanpara via Bahraich. A well-known national park in India, Dudhwa, is about 100 km (62 mi) from Nanpara Junction. Dudhwa is recognized as the second most populated tiger reserve in India. There is also a bird sanctuary and fauna-rich dense forests near Nanpara.
