= Jagdishpur (Industrial Area) =

Town in Uttar Pradesh, India

- Town
- Location in Uttar Pradesh, India Jagdishpur (India)
- Coordinates: 26.45°N 81.53°E
- Country: India
- State: Uttar Pradesh
- District: Amethi
- Elevation: 70 m (230 ft)

Population (2011)
  - Total: 32,447

Language
  - Official: Hindi
  - Additional official: Urdu
  - Regional: Awadhi
- Time zone: UTC+5:30 (IST)
- PIN: 227809
- Telephone code: 05361
- Vehicle registration: UP-36
- Website: up.gov.in

Jagdishpur is a town in Amethi in the Indian state of Uttar Pradesh.

== Demographics ==
As of the 2001 Census of India, Jagdishpur had a population of 31,029. Males constitute 52% of the population and females 48%. Jagdishpur has an average literacy rate of 70%, above than the national average of 59.5%: male literacy is 80%, and female literacy is 60%. In Jagdishpur, 12% of the population is under 6 years of age.

Religions in Jagdishpur
Religion	Percent
Hindus	69%
Muslims	30%
Jains	0.7%
Others†	0.3%
Distribution of religions †Includes Sikhs (0.2%), Buddhists (<0.2%).

== Location ==
Jagdishpur is situated at about 29 km from the District Headquarter Gauriganj of Amethi district on the National Highway No. 56. It is 85 km from Lucknow toward east and 50 km from Sultanpur. Nihalgarh is the railway station of Jagdishpur and is on Lucknow-Sultanpur-Varanasi route. Jagdishpur has been a major market itself and also played a role as a nodal centre for reaching to other important markets at other places. It has good road connections to the cities of Lucknow, Raebareli, Sultanpur, Varanasi, Faizabad and Pratapgarh.

During the period when prominent political personalities opted for Amethi as their parliamentary constituency (in 1980's), Jagdishpur was selected to be a most suitable place in the district for setting up heavy and medium scale industries for generating employment for locals and their multi-pronged development. Now it has become a grown up industrial area with Bharat Heavy Electricals Ltd., Indo-Gulf Fertilizers and Steel Authority of India Limited as being main establishments.
