= Musafirkhana =

- Town
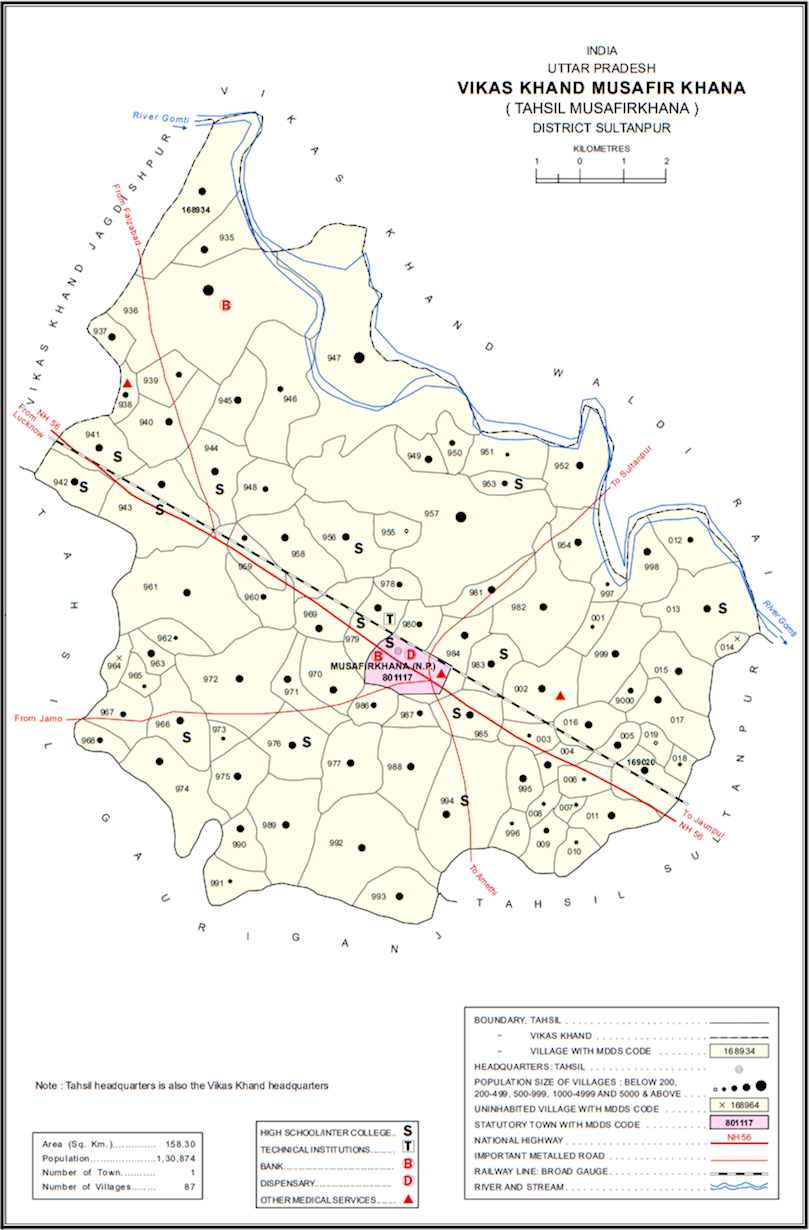
- Map showing Musafirkhana CD block

- Location in Uttar Pradesh, India Musafirkhana (India)
- Coordinates: 26°27′N 81°48′E
- Country: India
- State: Uttar Pradesh
- District: Amethi

Area
  - Total: 0.59 km^{2} (0.23 sq mi)
- Elevation: 102 m (335 ft)

Population (2011)
  - Total: 7,999
  - Density: 14,000/km^{2} (35,000/sq mi)

Language
  - Official: Hindi
  - Additional official: Urdu
  - Regional: Awadhi
- Time zone: UTC+5:30 (IST)
- PIN: 227813
- Vehicle registration: UP-36
- Website: amethi.nic.in

Musafirkhana is a town and tehsil in Amethi district in Indian state of Uttar Pradesh. The word "Musafirkhana" means "Sarai," or "Dharamshala". Musafirkhana is located 32 km northwest of district headquarters Amethi.

As of 2011, Musafirkhana's population is 7,999 people, in 1,276 households.

== History ==
At the turn of the 20th century, Musafirkhana was described as a small and run-down village that was of no importance besides being the tehsil headquarters. Why it was chosen as the seat of a tehsil is unclear — it was originally all the way in the corner of the tehsil, and was possibly chosen so that officials could keep an eye on the Kandu nala, which was formerly affected by bandits and dacoits.

Musafirkhana was originally a bazar — or rather sarai, as the name indicates — built on the village lands of Bhanauli. Their combined population in 1901 was 2,058, a quarter of whom were Muslims. At that time, Musafirkhana had a police station, pound, school, and dispensary.

== Geography ==
Musafirkhana is located at 26.37°N 81.8°E. It has an average elevation of 102 metres (334 feet). Musafirkhana is 32 km northwest of district headquarters Amethi, 20 km from Jagdishpur.

== Demographics ==
Historical population
Year	Pop.	±%
1991	5,731	—
2001	7,366	+28.5%
2011	7,999	+8.6%
Source: 2011 Census of India

As of 2011 Indian Census, Musafirkhana had a total population of 7,999, of which 4,143 were males and 3,856 were females. Population within the age group of 0 to 6 years was 1,018. The total number of literates in Musafirkhana was 5,876, which constituted 73.5% of the population with male literacy of 79.7% and female literacy of 66.7%. The effective literacy rate of 7+ population of Musafirkhana was 84.2%, of which male literacy rate was 91.2% and female literacy rate was 76.6%. The Scheduled Castes population was 414 respectively. Musafirkhana had 1276 households in 2011.

According to the Census of India conducted in 2001, Musafirkhana had a population of 7,373. Males constituted 53% of the population and females 47%. Musafirkhana has an average literacy rate of 66%, higher than the national average of 59.5%: male literacy is 75%, and female literacy is 57%. In Musafirkhana, 15% of the population is under 6 years of age.

The official languages of speak Musafirkhana are Hindi and Urdu.

== Transport ==
Musafirkhana Railway Station

Musafirkhana has a railway station on the Varanasi-Lucknow rail route.
