= National Highway 128 (India) =

National highway in India

National Highway 128
- Map of National Highway 128 in red

Route information
- Length: 164 km (102 mi)

Major junctions
- From: Tanda
- To: Rae Bareli

Location
- Country: India
- Primary destinations: Ambedkar Nagar – Sultanpur – Amethi

Highway system
- Roads in India; Expressways; National; State; Asian
← NH 28	→ NH 30

National Highway 128 (NH 128) is a National Highway in India. This highway runs entirely in the state of Uttar Pradesh.
