= National Highway 751DD (India) =

National Highway in India

National Highway 751DD
- Map of National Highway 751DD in red

Route information
- Auxiliary route of NH 51
- Length: 27.3 km (17.0 mi)

Major junctions
- West end: Vataman
- East end: Bandhani Chowk

Location
- Country: India
- States: Gujarat

Highway system
- Roads in India; Expressways; National; State; Asian
← NH 751D	→ NH 751DD

National Highway 751DD, commonly referred to as NH 751DD is a national highway in India. It is a secondary route of National Highway 51. NH-751DD runs in the state of Gujarat in India.

== Route ==
NH751DD connects Tarapur, Sojitra, Piplav, Sunav and Bandhani Chowk in the state of Gujarat.

== Junctions ==
NH 751D Terminal near Tarapur.

== See also ==
- List of national highways in India
- List of national highways in India by state
