= National Highway 751D (India) =

National Highway in India

National Highway 751D
- Map of National Highway 751D in red

Route information
- Auxiliary route of NH 51
- Length: 44 km (27 mi)

Major junctions
- West end: Vataman
- East end: Dharmaj

Location
- Country: India
- States: Gujarat

Highway system
- Roads in India; Expressways; National; State; Asian
← NH 751	→ NH 64

National Highway 751D, commonly referred to as NH 751D is a national highway in India. It is a secondary route of National Highway 51. passes through Vadodara district- Anand district-Kheda district- Ahmedabad district.NH-751D runs in the state of Gujarat in India.

== Route ==
NH751D connects Vataman Chowk, Fatepura, Valandapura, Indranaj, Tarapur, Lakulesh Nagar and Dharmaj in the state of Gujarat.

== Junctions ==
NH 751 Terminal near Vataman.
NH 751DD near Tarapur
NH 64 Terminal near Dharmaj.

== See also ==
- List of national highways in India
- List of national highways in India by state
