= National Highway 151 (India) =

National highway in India

National Highway 151
- Map of the National Highway in red
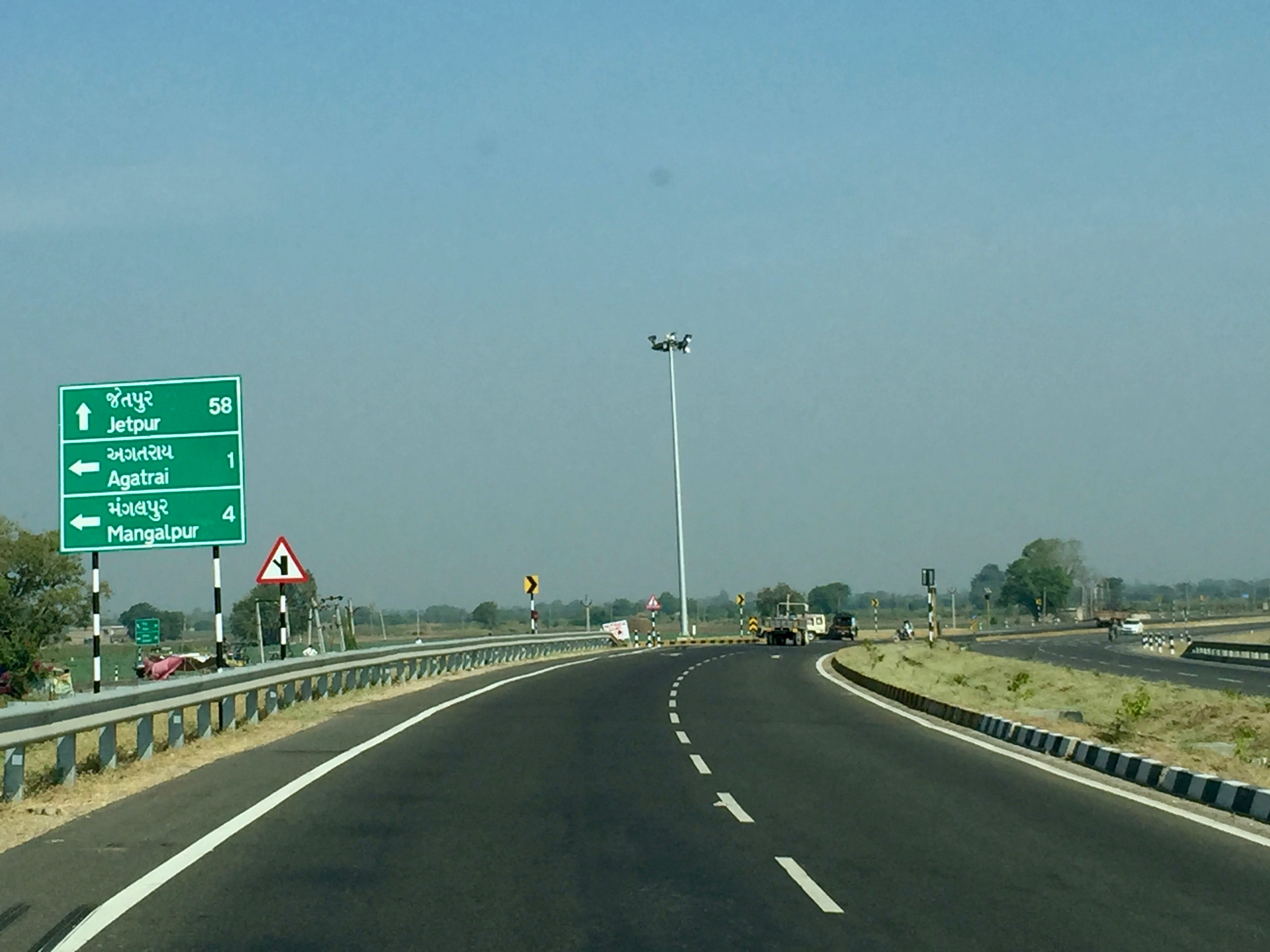

Route information
- Auxiliary route of NH 51
- Length: 127.75 km (79.38 mi)

Major junctions
- South end: Gadu
- North end: Jetpur

Location
- Country: India
- States: Gujarat

Highway system
- Roads in India; Expressways; National; State; Asian
← NH 51	→ NH 27

National Highway 151 (NH 151) is a national highway in India. It is a secondary route of National Highway 51. NH-151 runs in the state of Gujarat in India.

== Route ==
Schematic map of National Highways in India

NH151 connects Gadu, Vanthali, Junagadh and Jetpur in the state of Gujarat.

== Junctions ==
NH 51 Terminal near Gad
NH 351 near Jetpur
NH 27 Terminal near Jetpur.

== See also ==
- List of national highways in India
- List of national highways in India by state
