= NH 51 =

NH 51 may refer to:

- National Highway 51 (India)
- New Hampshire Route 51, United States
