= National Highway 351F (India) =

National Highway in India

National Highway 351F
- Map of National Highway 351F in red

Route information
- Auxiliary route of NH 51
- Length: 54.4 km (33.8 mi)

Major junctions
- West end: Amreli
- East end: Dhasa Chowk

Location
- Country: India
- States: Gujarat

Highway system
- Roads in India; Expressways; National; State; Asian
← NH 351	→ NH 51

National Highway 351F, commonly referred to as NH 351F is a national highway in India. It is a secondary route of National Highway 51. NH-351F runs in the state of Gujarat in India.

== Route ==
NH351F connects Amreli Chowk, Ishvariya, Varasda, Pipariya, Toda, Lathy, Mahavirnagar, Chavand and Dhasa Chowk in the state of Gujarat.

== Junctions ==
NH 351 Terminal near Amreli.
NH 51 Terminal near Dhasa Chowk.

== See also ==
- List of national highways in India
- List of national highways in India by state
