= Bhanduri =

Village in Gujarat, India

Coordinates: 21°06′N 70°17′E

Bhanduri is a village in Maliya Hatina Taluka of Junagadh district, Gujarat, India. It is situated on the National high way no.151 at a distance of about thirty -eight miles from Junagadh and eighteen miles from Veraval.

During British period, it was the headquarters of the mahal of that name, and a vahivatdar and a second class magistrate reside there.

There is no outer town wall, but an inner citadel which has a picturesque appearance. The sugarcane of this part of the country is particularly good.
