= National Highway 751 (India) =

National Highway in India

National Highway 751
- Map of National Highway 751 in red

Route information
- Auxiliary route of NH 51
- Length: 159 km (99 mi)

Major junctions
- South end: Bhavnagar
- North end: Sarkhej

Location
- Country: India
- States: Gujarat

Highway system
- Roads in India; Expressways; National; State; Asian
← NH 51	→ NH 47

National Highway 751, commonly referred to as NH 751 is a national highway in India. It is a secondary route of National Highway 51. NH-751 runs in the state of Gujarat in India.

== Route ==
NH751 will be connecting Ahmeadabad to Dholera SIR and then it will go to Bhavnagar from Dholera, Dholera SIR has 250 Meter wide alignment for the central spine road, NH 751 is access Control Express way and is elevated at most of the junctions it connects (Nari Junction) near Bhavnagar, Bavaliyari, Dholera, Ambali, Vataman, Chaloda, Bhat, Visalpur and Sardar Patel Ring Road(NH47) near Sarkhej in the state of Gujarat.

== Junctions ==
NH 51 Terminal near Bhavnagar.
NH 751D near Vataman
NH 47 Terminal near Sarkhej.

== See also ==
- List of national highways in India
- List of national highways in India by state
