= National Highway 251 (India) =

National highway in India

National Highway 251
- Map of National Highway 251 in red

Route information
- Length: 30 km (19 mi)

Major junctions
- East end: Una
- West end: Kesaria, Gujarat

Location
- Country: India
- States: Gujarat, Dadra and Nagar Haveli and Daman and Diu

Highway system
- Roads in India; Expressways; National; State; Asian
| ← NH 51 | → NH 51 |

National Highway 251, commonly called NH 251 is a national highway in India. It is a spur road of National Highway 51. NH-251 traverses the state of Gujarat and the union territory of Dadra and Nagar Haveli and Daman and Diu in India.

== Route ==
Gujarat

Una

Dadra and Nagar Haveli and Daman and Diu

Ghoghla, Diu

Gujarat

Kesaria

== Junctions ==
NH 51 Terminal near Una.
NH 51 Terminal near Kesaria.

== See also ==
- List of national highways in India
- List of national highways in India by state
