= Bhalka =

Death-place of Krishna in Gujarat, India

Bhalka Temple
- Bhalka Tirtha
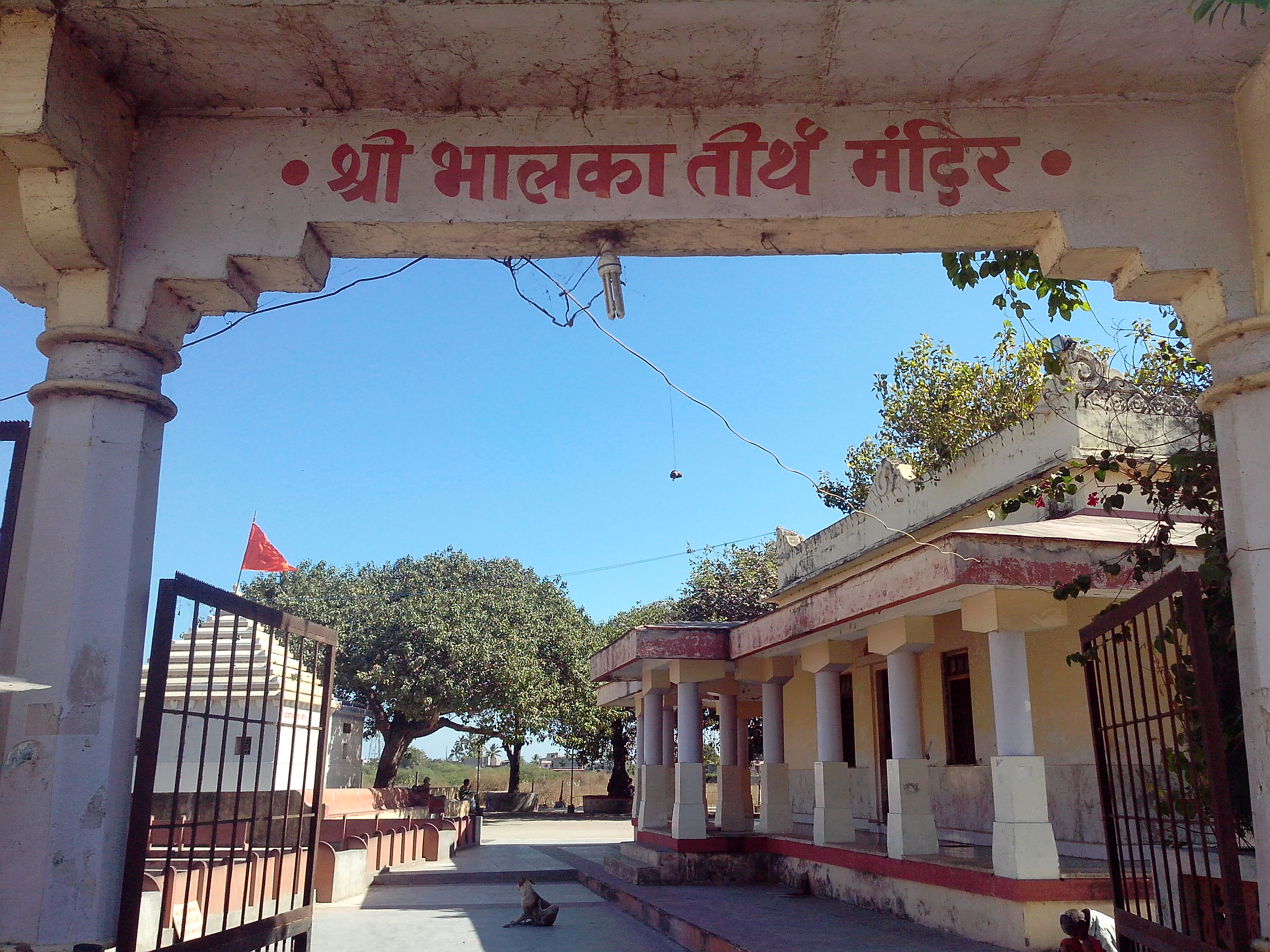

- Location within Gujarat

Religion
- Affiliation: Hinduism
- District: Gir Somnath
- Deity: Krishna
- Festival: Janmashtami
- Governing body: Shree Somnath Trust

Location
- Location: Veraval
- State: Gujarat
- Country: India
- Coordinates: 20°53′16.9″N 70°24′5.0″E

Architecture
- Type: Temple
- Style: Maru-Gurjara

Bhalka Temple, also known as Bhalka Tirtha (transl. Tirtha: "Holy Pilgrimage Site"), is a Hindu temple located in Veraval, Gujarat on the western coast of India. It marks the location where Krishna concluded his earthly pastimes and completed his ascension to his spiritual abode. According to the Mahabharata and the Bhagavata Purana, a hunter named Jara mistook Krishna's partly visible foot for a deer from a distance and released an arrow, an event that served as the catalyst for Krishna's departure from the physical world. In the epic and Puranas, this event is commemorated as the Shri Krishna Nijdham Prasthan Leela. Both texts state that this was a voluntary spiritual exit; upon approaching, the hunter found Krishna already seated in his four-armed divine form before his ascension. Bhalka Tirtha is part of the Lord Krishna pilgrimage circuit, which includes Mathura, Vrindavan, Barsana, Govardhan, Kurukshetra, and Dwarka.

== Legend ==
According to the Mahabharata, the Kurukshetra War resulted in the death of all the hundred sons of Gandhari. Following the conflict, Gandhari cursed that Krishna, along with the entire Yadu dynasty, would perish after 36 years. Krishna accepted her words, noting that the internal destruction of the Yadavas was destined.

Thirty-six years later, the Yadava clan destroyed itself during an internal conflict at Prabhasa. His elder brother, Balarama, subsequently departed the earthly plane through Yoga. Krishna then retired into the forest, sat beneath a tree, and entered deep meditation, resting his foot upon his knee.

The Bhagavata Purana and the Mahabharata record that a hunter named Jara mistook the reddish sole of Krishna's foot for a hidden deer and shot an arrow from a distance. Upon approaching, Jara found Krishna seated in his four-armed divine form.

Jara prostrated himself at Krishna's feet to beg for forgiveness. Krishna comforted the hunter, stating that the event occurred by his own will and divine plan, and granted him ascension to the spiritual realm. Following this interaction, Krishna withdrew his presence from the earthly plane and returned to his eternal abode. The text notes that this disappearance was a manifestation of divine potency, rather than a physical demise.

While some folklore traditions connect the hunter Jara to the rebirth of the Vanara king Vali, viewing the event as the completion of a boon related to Rama from the Ramayana, this specific narrative belongs to later folk legends and is not recorded in the primary canonical texts of the Mausala Parva or the Bhagavata Purana.

According to Puranic sources, (Note: The Bhagavata Purana (1.18.6), Vishnu Purana (5.38.8), and Brahma Purana (2.103.8) state that the day Krishna left the earth was the day that the Dvapara Yuga ended and the Kali Yuga began.) Krishna's disappearance marks the end of Dvapara Yuga and the start of Kali Yuga, which is dated to 17/18 February 3102 BCE.

== Location ==
Bhalka temple is located in the coastal city of Veraval in Gujarat. The temple is located just 4 km from Somnath Temple, another important hindu pilgrimages site in the city. Presently the government has planned to develop this temple also into a major tourist attraction. It is about 2.3 kilometres (1 mi) southeast of the Veraval Junction railway station, about 700 metres (0 mi) east of Veraval port and about 85 kilometres (53 mi) west of the Diu airport.

== Connectivity ==
Bus services are available from places like Ahmedabad, Vadodara, Rajkot, and Dwarka.

Nearest Railway Station: Veraval Junction - It is 2.3 km by road from Bhalka Temple.

Nearest Airport: Keshod airport - It is 52 km away from Bhalka Temple.

== Gallery ==
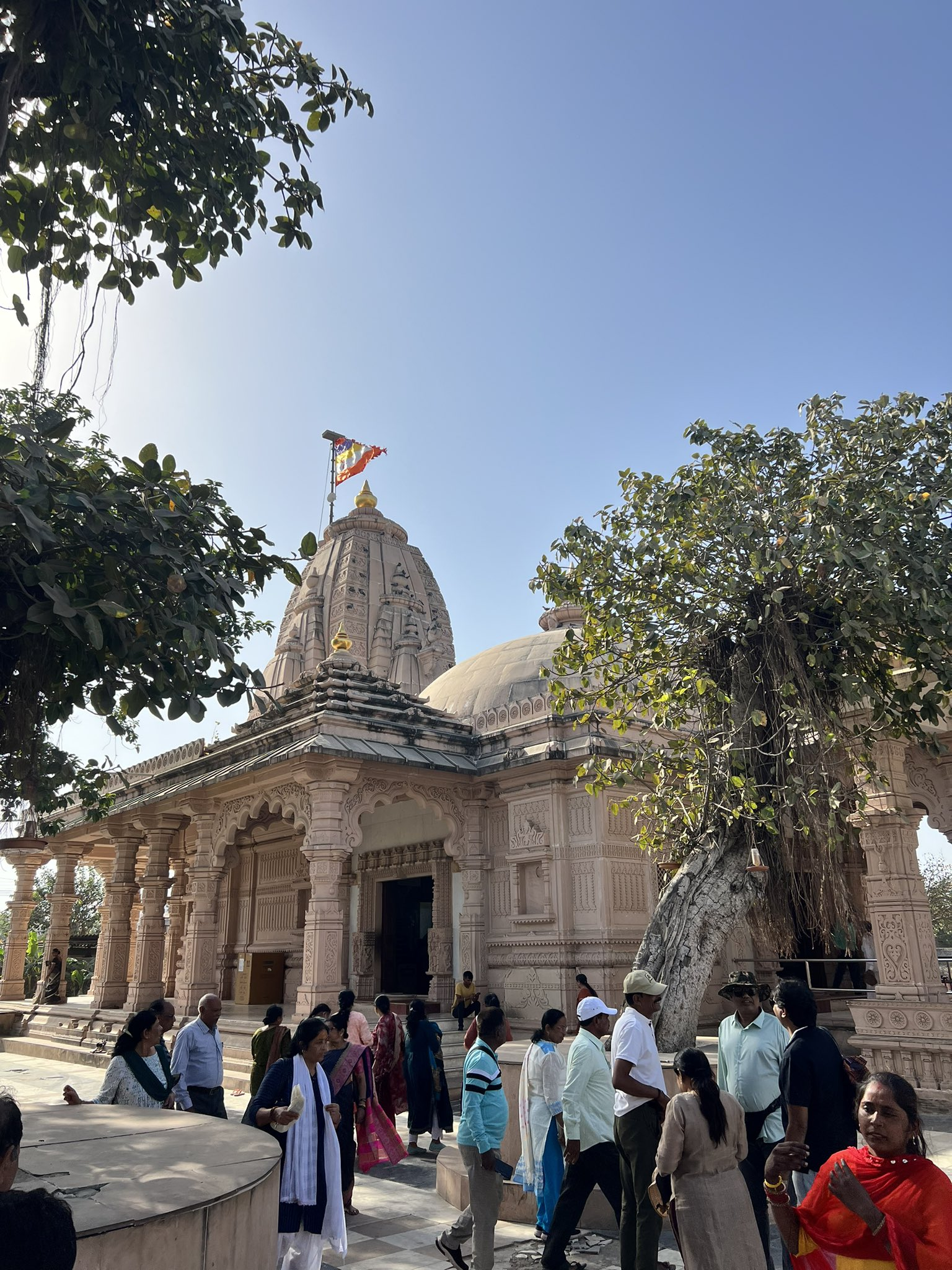
Bhalka Temple

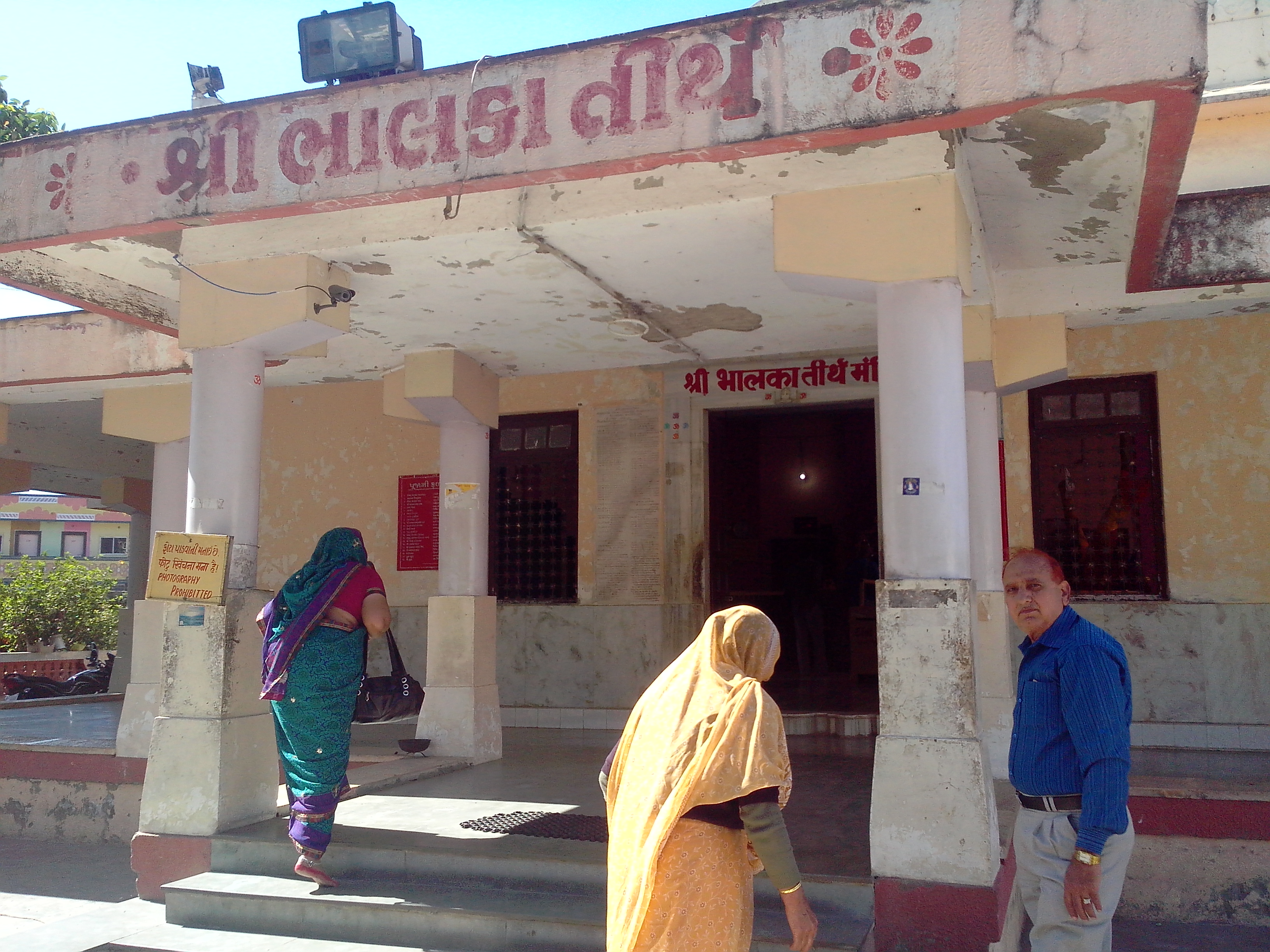
Bhalka Teerth

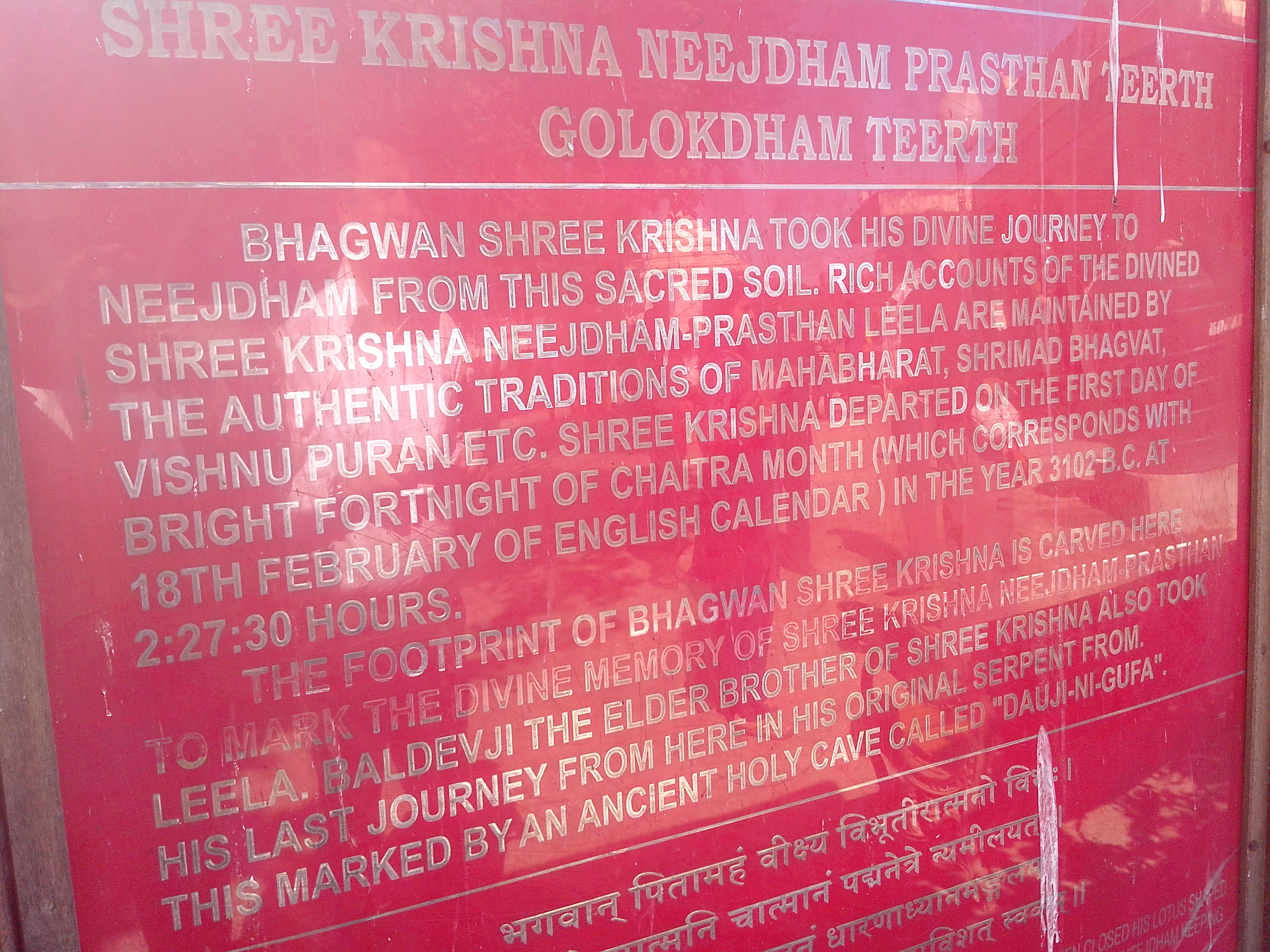
Sign Board depicting the importance of the place

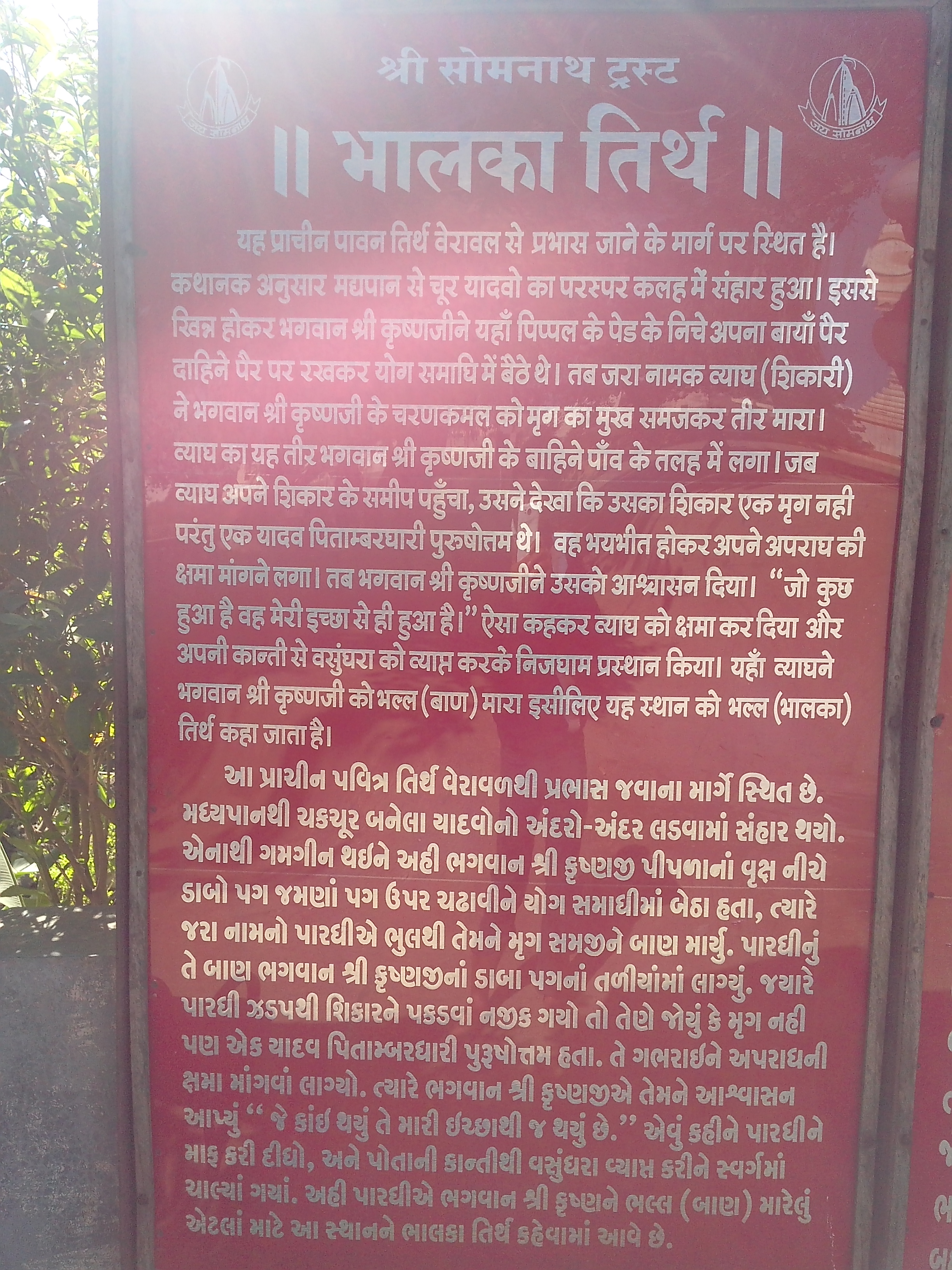
Sign Board depicting the importance of the place

== See also ==
- Barsana
- Dwarka
- Mathura
- Vrindavan

== Sources ==
- Bryant, Edwin F. (2007), Krishna: A Sourcebook, Oxford University Press, ISBN 978-0-19-514891-6
