= National Highway 351 (India) =

National highway in India

National Highway 351
- Map of the National Highway in red

Route information
- Length: 143 km (89 mi)

Major junctions
- East end: Mahuva
- West end: Jetpur

Location
- Country: India
- States: Gujarat

Highway system
- Roads in India; Expressways; National; State; Asian
← NH 51	→ NH 27

National Highway 351, commonly called NH 351 is a national highway in India. It is a spur road of National Highway 51. NH-351 traverses the state of Gujarat in India.

== Route ==
Mahuva, Saverkundla, Amreli, Bagasara, Jetpur.

== Junctions ==
NH 51 near Mahuva.
NH 351F near Amreli.
NH 27 near Jetpur.

== See also ==
- List of national highways in India
- List of national highways in India by state
