= Veraval =

- City
- Somnath
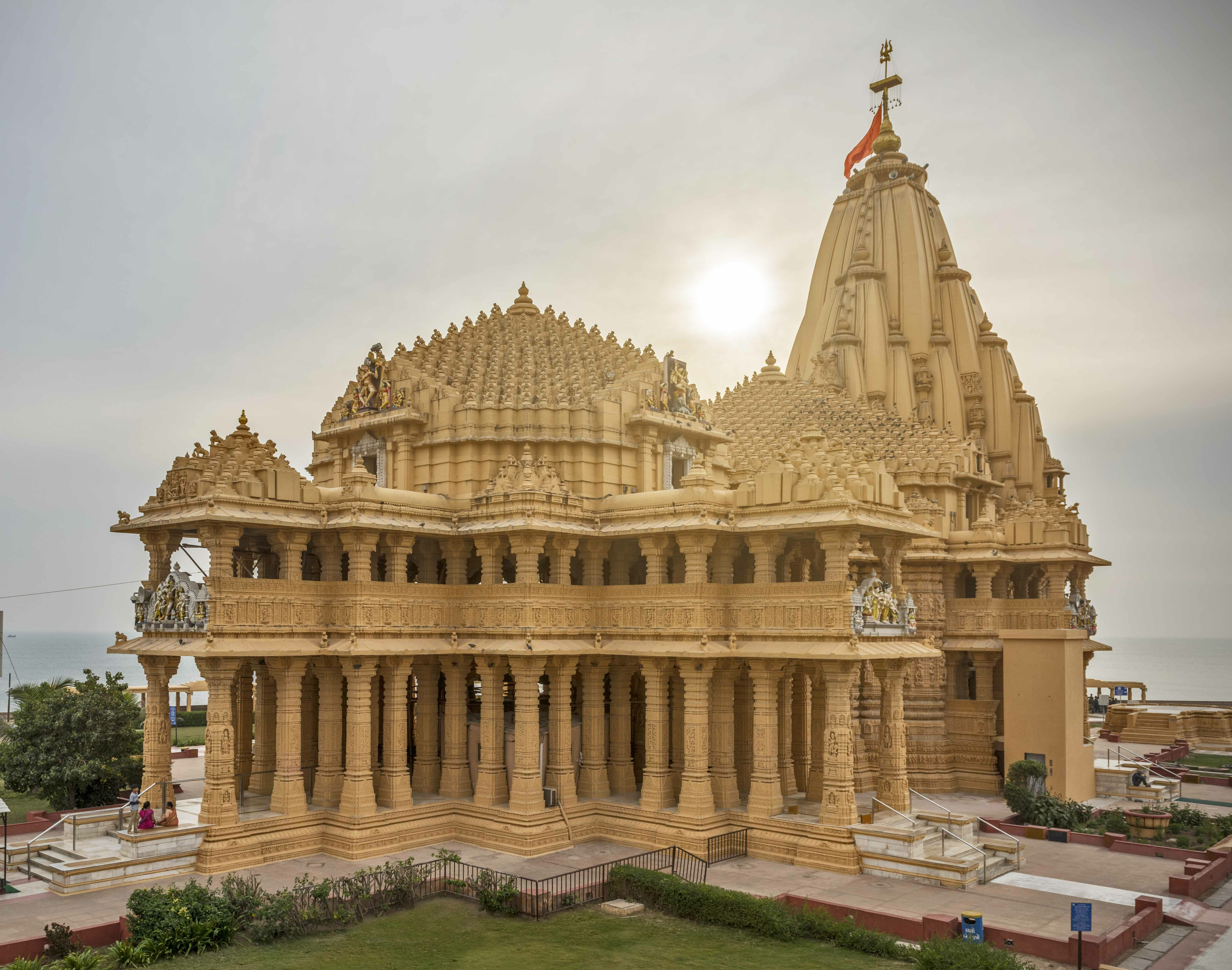
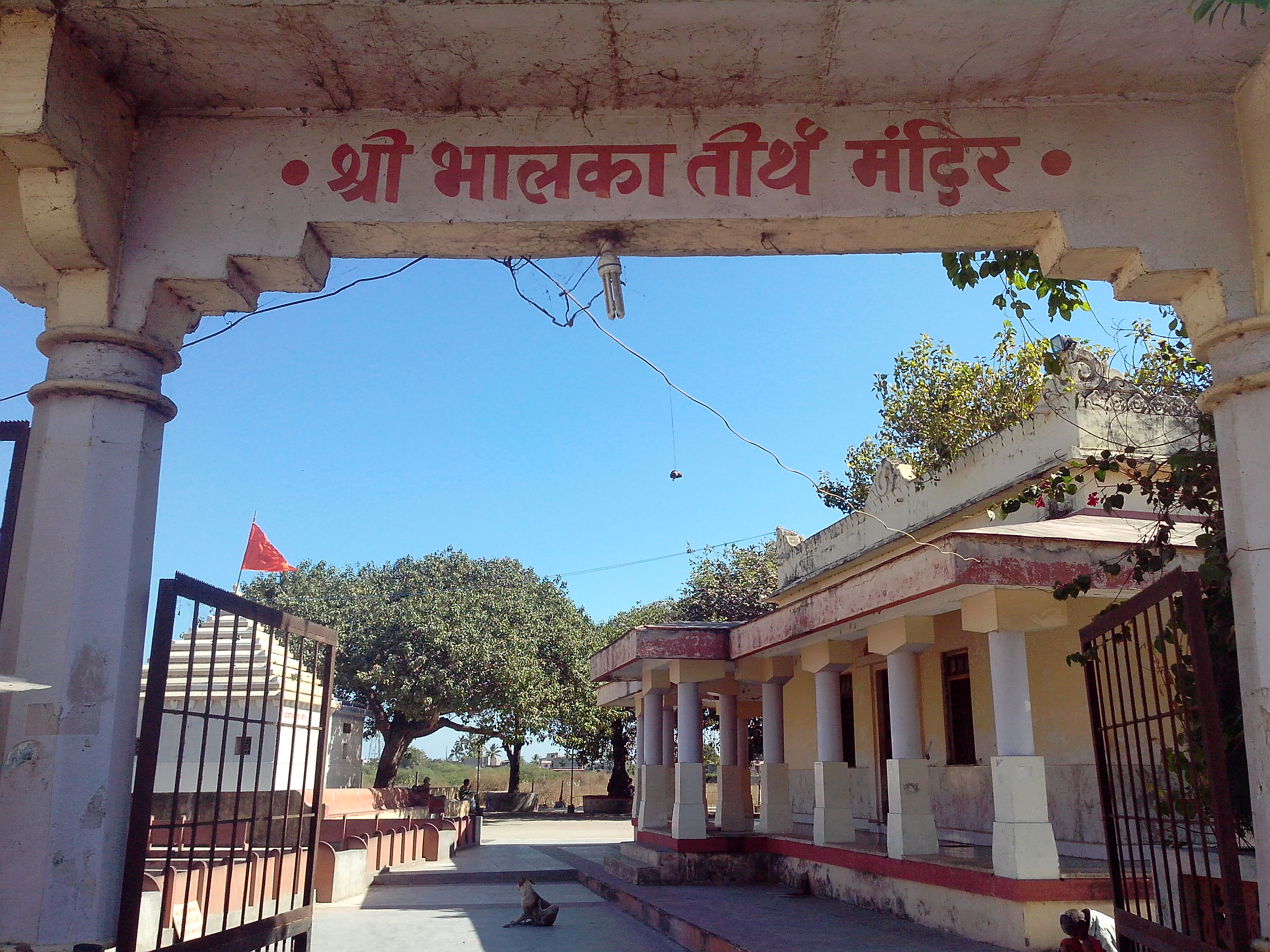
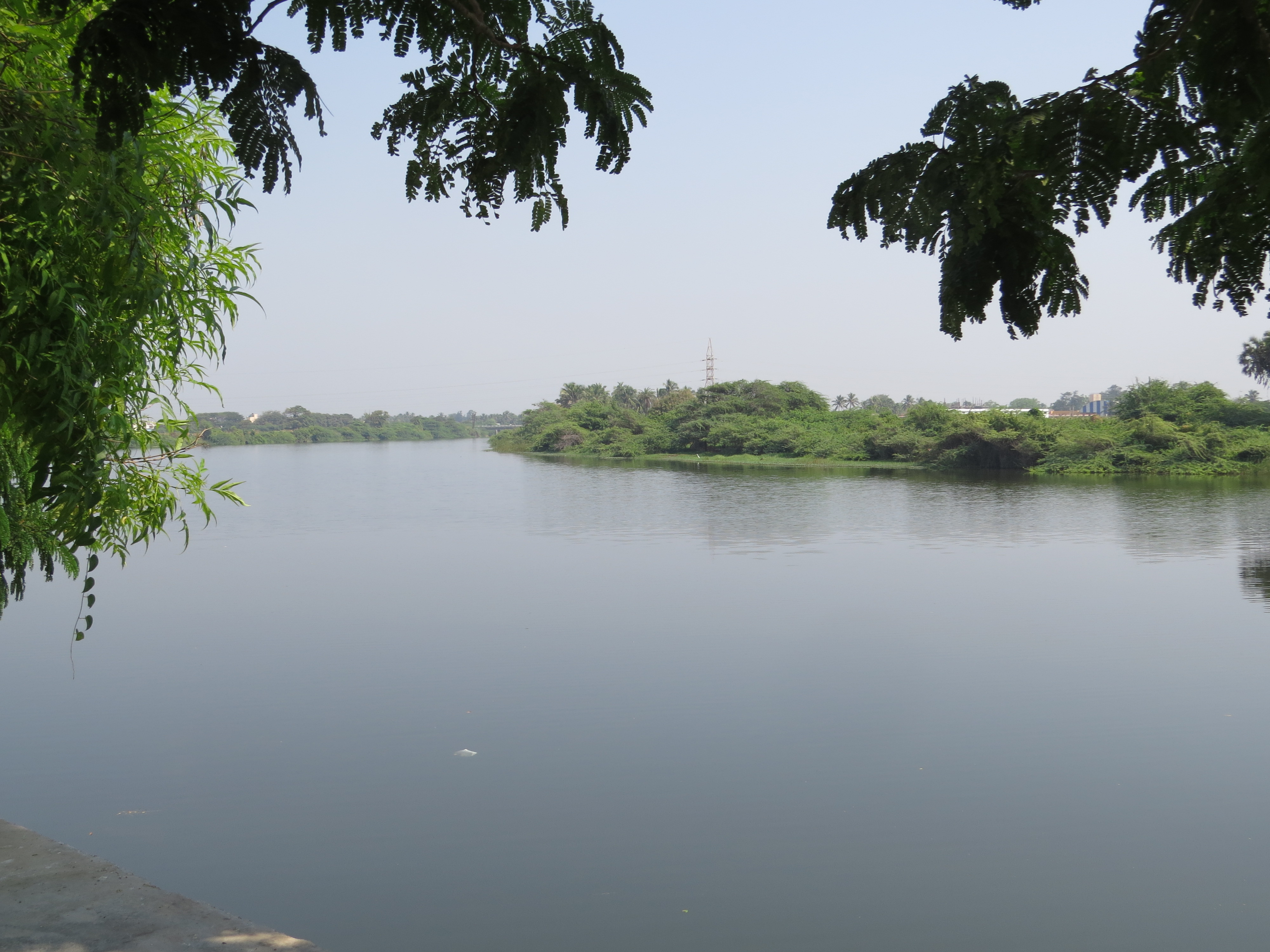
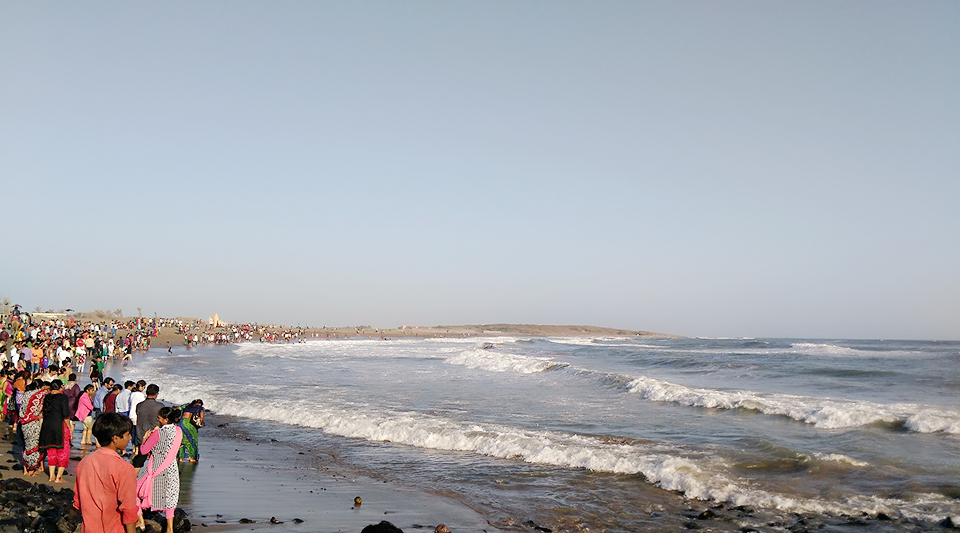
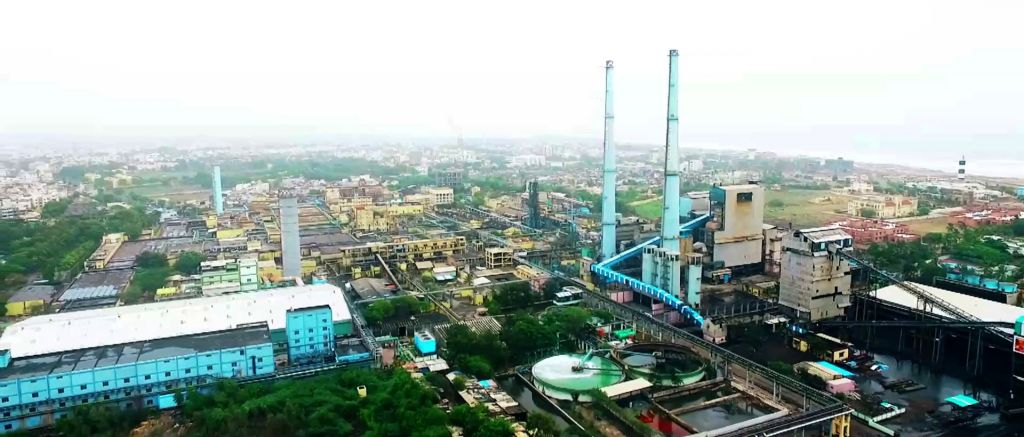
- Clockwise from top: Somnath Temple, Triveni Sangam, Indian Rayon factory, Veraval Coastline, Bhalka Temple
- Interactive map of Veraval
- Veraval (Gujarat) Veraval (India)
- Coordinates: 20°54′57.2″N 70°21′46.4″E
- Country: India
- State: Gujarat
- Region: Saurashtra
- District: Gir Somnath

Government
  - Type: Municipal Council
  - Body: Somnath Municipal Council
  - President: Naresh Gohel (BJP)
  - Vice President: Hemiben Jethva (BJP)

Area
  - Total: 39.95 km^{2} (15.42 sq mi)
- Elevation: 18.62 m (61.1 ft)

Population (2011)
  - Total: 185,797
  - Density: 4,651/km^{2} (12,050/sq mi)
- Demonym(s): Veravali, Sommathians

Languages
  - Official: Gujarati; Hindi
- Time zone: UTC+5:30 (IST)
- PINs: 362265–362269
- Area code: +912876xxxxxx
- Vehicle registration: GJ-32
- Sex ratio: 965/1000 (♀/♂)
- Literacy rate: 76.49%
- Urban planning agency: Somnath Urban Development Authority
- Website: Somanth Municipal Council

Veraval, also known as Somnath, is a coastal city and the headquarters of Gir Somnath district in the Indian state of Gujarat. Somnath Temple, a place of pilgrimage due to its importance as one of the 12 Jyotirlinga sites dedicated to the Hindu deity Shiva, is located here. Veraval is also associated with the final earthly moments of Lord Krishna, as Bhalka Tirtha, traditionally believed to be the place where Krishna was struck by the arrow of the hunter Jara, is located in the city. It is one of India's major fishing ports and a prominent centre for seafood processing and export.

== Etymology ==
The present name Veraval is generally traced to the Prakrit word velā or vela, derived from the Sanskrit term velākula or velakul (वेलाकुल), meaning a coastal settlement, shore, or landing place. The term is associated with maritime activity and coastal habitation, reflecting the town's historical role as a port and fishing centre along the Arabian Sea.

In historical sources, Veraval has also been referred to as Somnathpura. The town has also been referred to as Somnath Bandar, a name that highlights its geographical and functional association with the Somnath Temple and its role as the principal port serving the temple town.

Medieval Arabic and Persian accounts of the western Indian coastline mention the harbour at Veraval in connection with maritime trade routes linking western India with West Asia and eastern Africa, indicating its importance as a regional port during the medieval period.

Over time, as administrative usage became standardised under regional and later colonial governance, the name Veraval came into common and official use, while Somnath became obsolete.

On 30 March 2021, Veraval Municipality unanimously passed a resolution to officially change the name of the city from Veraval to Somnath. Along with this, they also decided to rename the municipal body as Somnath Municipality. The final decision will be taken by Home Ministry of India.

== History ==
=== Ancient period ===
The region surrounding Veraval, situated on the Saurashtra coast of present-day Gujarat, has been inhabited since ancient times. Archaeological evidence indicates that the broader Saurashtra peninsula formed part of the cultural and trade network of the Indus Valley Civilization (c. 2600–1900 BCE), with coastal settlements participating in maritime trade across the Arabian Sea.

Following the decline of the Indus Valley Civilization, the region continued to be occupied during the Vedic and early historic periods. Classical Greco-Roman sources such as the Periplus of the Erythraean Sea (1st century CE) describe active maritime trade along the western coast of India, including ports in Saurashtra that engaged in commerce with the Roman Empire.

=== Early medieval period ===
During the early medieval period, the region came under the rule of the Maitrakas of Vallabhi (c. 5th–8th centuries CE), followed by local dynasties such as the Saindhavas and the Chudasamas.

Veraval’s growth was closely tied to the Somnath temple within the town, one of the twelve Jyotirlinga shrines of Shiva, which became a major religious and economic center. The temple attracted pilgrims from across the Indian subcontinent and contributed to the growth of settlements in its vicinity.

=== Islamic incursions and Sultanate rule ===
The region gained prominence in historical records following the raid on the Somnath temple by Mahmud of Ghazni in 1025 CE. Persian chronicles describe the event as part of his campaigns into the Indian subcontinent.

In subsequent centuries, Saurashtra came under the control of the Delhi Sultanate and later the Gujarat Sultanate. Coastal towns such as Veraval continued to function as active ports facilitating maritime trade across the Arabian Sea.

=== Mughal and Maratha period ===
By the 16th century, the region was incorporated into the Mughals. Under Mughal administration, trade and port activities remained significant, with coastal Gujarat playing a key role in Indian Ocean commerce.

Following the decline of Mughal authority in the 18th century, Saurashtra experienced political fragmentation, with control passing between local rulers and Maratha Empire.

=== Princely state era ===
During the 18th and 19th centuries, Veraval formed part of the princely state of Junagadh State, ruled by Muslim Nawabs under British paramountcy. The town developed as an important port, supporting regional trade, fishing, and shipbuilding industries.

Infrastructure improvements during the colonial period, including port facilities and railway connections, enhanced Veraval’s role as a commercial center in the Kathiawar region.

The city still bears some remnants of the old Nawabi heritage, the Nawabi summer palace being among them. There are ruins of the old Nawabi fort and Nawabi gates in and around the place. The old walls of the port are now ruined, but the impressive Junagadh gate and the Patan gate are still seen, although in a very bad state.

=== Integration into India and modern era ===
At the time of the Partition of India in 1947, Junagadh State acceded to Pakistan despite its predominantly Hindu population. Following political unrest and administrative intervention by India, a plebiscite was held in February 1948 in which the majority voted in favor of accession to India.

After integration into the Indian Union, Veraval developed into one of India’s major fishing ports and a significant center for seafood processing.

== Geography ==
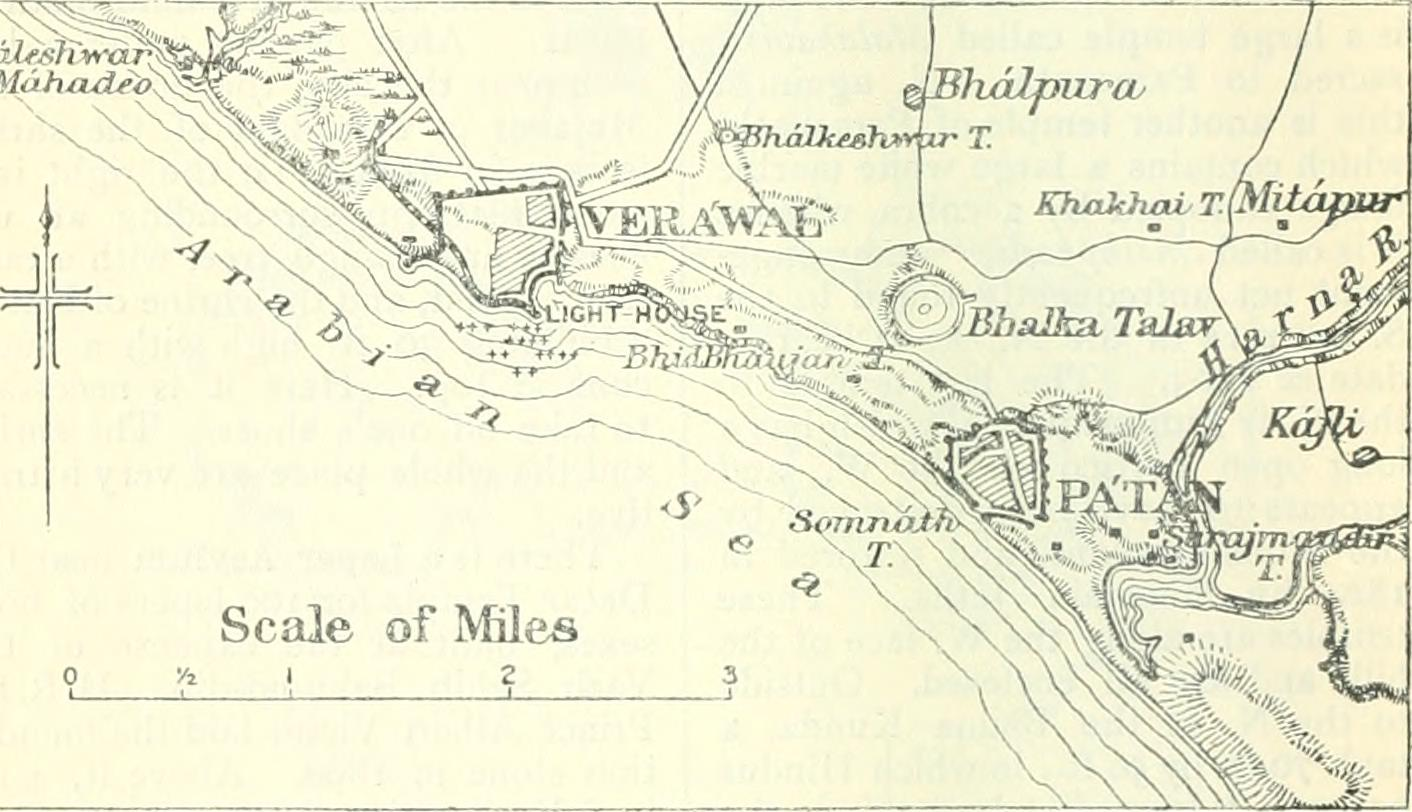
Veraval Somnath Environ map 1911

Veraval is located at 20.9°N 70.37°E. It has an average elevation of 0 metres (0 feet). It is a coastal urban area situated along the Arabian Sea on the southern coast of the Saurashtra peninsula.

The terrain of the city area is predominantly flat and low-lying, characteristic of the western coastal plains of Gujarat. The coastline includes sandy beaches interspersed with rocky stretches, while the land gradually rises further inland. The natural harbour at Veraval has historically supported fishing and maritime activity, while the coastal setting has equally influenced the spatial development as part of the same urban geography.

The region experiences a tropical climate, with hot summers, a southwest monsoon season, and mild winters. Most annual rainfall occurs between June and September due to the monsoon. Proximity to the Arabian Sea moderates temperature extremes compared to inland areas of the Saurashtra region.

The surrounding area includes coastal ecosystems, fishing zones, and agricultural land, while the Gir forest region lies further inland to the east.

== Demographics ==
Religions in Veraval (2011)
Religion	Percent
Hindus	68.33%
Muslims	30.71%
Other or not stated	0.96%

As of the 2011 India census, Veraval had a population of 153,696. Males constitute 51% of the population and females 49%. Veraval has an average literacy rate of 62%, higher than the national average of 59.5%: male literacy is 71%, and female literacy is 53%. In Veraval, 14% of the population is under 6 years of age.

== Climate ==
Veraval has a tropical savanna climate (Köppen Aw) borderline on a hot semi-arid climate (BSh) with very warm to hot temperatures throughout the year. Almost all rainfall occurs during the summer monsoon season from June to September, typically falling in extremely short-lived but intense storms: on average rain falls for a total of fewer than eighty hours each year. Rainfall is also exceptionally variable from year to year: only 69.7 millimetres or 2.74 inches fell in 1901, but as much as 1,888.3 millimetres or 74.34 inches fell in 2009, of which 1,531.7 millimetres or 60.30 inches fell in July of that year and a record daily total of 503.8 millimetres or 19.83 inches on Veraval's wettest day of 16 July 2009.

Climate data for Veraval (1991–2020, extremes 1901–present)
Month	Jan	Feb	Mar	Apr	May	Jun	Jul	Aug	Sep	Oct	Nov	Dec	Year
Record high °C (°F)	37.4 (99.3)	38.8 (101.8)	42.9 (109.2)	43.1 (109.6)	44.2 (111.6)	39.2 (102.6)	37.1 (98.8)	34.9 (94.8)	38.2 (100.8)	41.2 (106.2)	38.9 (102.0)	35.8 (96.4)	44.2 (111.6)
Mean daily maximum °C (°F)	29.2 (84.6)	30.0 (86.0)	32.0 (89.6)	32.5 (90.5)	33.0 (91.4)	32.8 (91.0)	30.8 (87.4)	30.0 (86.0)	31.1 (88.0)	34.1 (93.4)	33.7 (92.7)	30.9 (87.6)	31.7 (89.1)
Daily mean °C (°F)	22.3 (72.1)	23.6 (74.5)	26.1 (79.0)	27.9 (82.2)	29.7 (85.5)	30.3 (86.5)	28.8 (83.8)	28.0 (82.4)	28.2 (82.8)	29.0 (84.2)	27.3 (81.1)	24.2 (75.6)	27.1 (80.8)
Mean daily minimum °C (°F)	15.4 (59.7)	17.1 (62.8)	20.2 (68.4)	23.5 (74.3)	26.5 (79.7)	27.7 (81.9)	26.8 (80.2)	25.9 (78.6)	25.4 (77.7)	24.0 (75.2)	21.2 (70.2)	17.5 (63.5)	22.6 (72.7)
Record low °C (°F)	4.4 (39.9)	4.4 (39.9)	9.4 (48.9)	13.9 (57.0)	18.1 (64.6)	20.0 (68.0)	20.4 (68.7)	20.4 (68.7)	19.0 (66.2)	13.3 (55.9)	10.0 (50.0)	7.2 (45.0)	4.4 (39.9)
Average rainfall mm (inches)	0.9 (0.04)	0.2 (0.01)	0.3 (0.01)	0.3 (0.01)	1.5 (0.06)	146.8 (5.78)	342.0 (13.46)	255.6 (10.06)	110.1 (4.33)	13.9 (0.55)	4.7 (0.19)	0.9 (0.04)	877.1 (34.53)
Average rainy days	0.2	0.0	0.0	0.0	0.1	5.2	11.2	9.2	5.1	1.0	0.3	0.1	32.5
Average relative humidity (%) (at 17:30 IST)	55	62	70	74	76	79	84	85	80	71	62	56	71
Source 1: India Meteorological Department
Source 2: Tokyo Climate Center (mean temperatures 1991–2020)

== Civic administration ==
Veraval is the administrative headquarters of Gir Somnath district and is administered by Somnath Municipal Council. The council was established in January 1950. The Council Chief Officer is a Gujarat Administrative Service (GAS) appointed by the state government who reserves the administrative executive powers, whereas the Municipality is headed by the President. The city is structured into 11 wards with a total of 44 elected councillor seats. The administrative responsibilities of municipality are water and sewerage services, primary education, health services, fire services, public transport and the city's infrastructure. The Urban planning and development of suburban area are done by Somnath Urban Development Authority.

== People ==
Veraval has a predominant Gujarati population. Amongst Gujaratis, Karadiya Rajput, Kumbhar Samaj (Prajapati), Jains (Oswal), the Soni (Jewellers, mainly from the clans of Dhakan, Patt, Sagar, etc.), Kharwa, DHUNDHA FAMILY Ahir (Yadav), brahma samaj and the Kolis Patni Jamat, Rajwadi bhois, Hadi, Lohanas, Maleks, Memons, and Raykas. There is also a sizable population Sindhis. Gujarati and Hindi are the most common languages in the town. Migratory people from other parts of the country also hold a good amount of population in the city.

== Education ==
Veraval serves as an educational hub for the surrounding coastal region of Saurashtra, with institutions offering primary, secondary, and higher education. Schools in the city are affiliated with the Gujarat Secondary and Higher Secondary Education Board (GSEB), while some private institutions follow national boards such as CBSE.

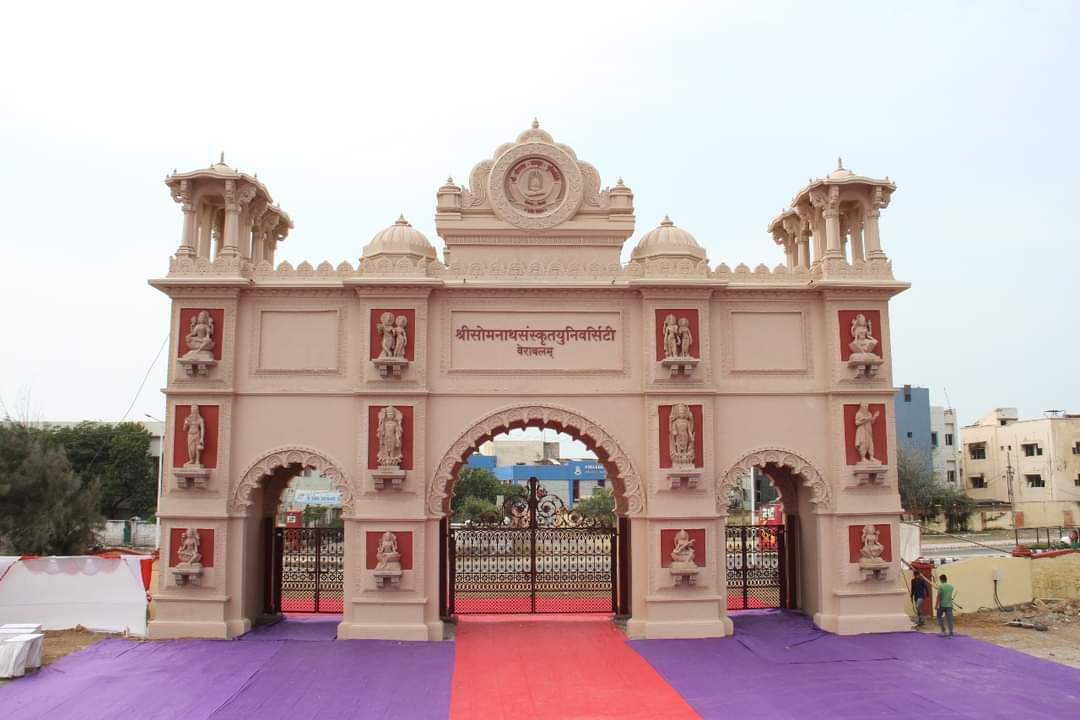
University gate

Higher education in Veraval is supported by several colleges offering undergraduate and postgraduate programmes in arts, commerce, and science. Notable institutions include Shree Somnath Sanskrit University, which specialises in Sanskrit studies, Indology, and traditional Indian knowledge systems, and colleges affiliated with Saurashtra University that provide general and professional courses.

The city also has institutions focused on technical and vocational education, particularly in fields related to fisheries, marine engineering, and coastal industries, reflecting Veraval’s status as one of India’s major fishing ports. Training centres and polytechnic institutes cater to skill development in these sectors.

In addition to formal education, religious and cultural institutions in the Somnath area contribute to traditional learning, particularly in Sanskrit and Vedic studies. Libraries and local educational initiatives further support literacy and continuing education in the region.

== Economy ==
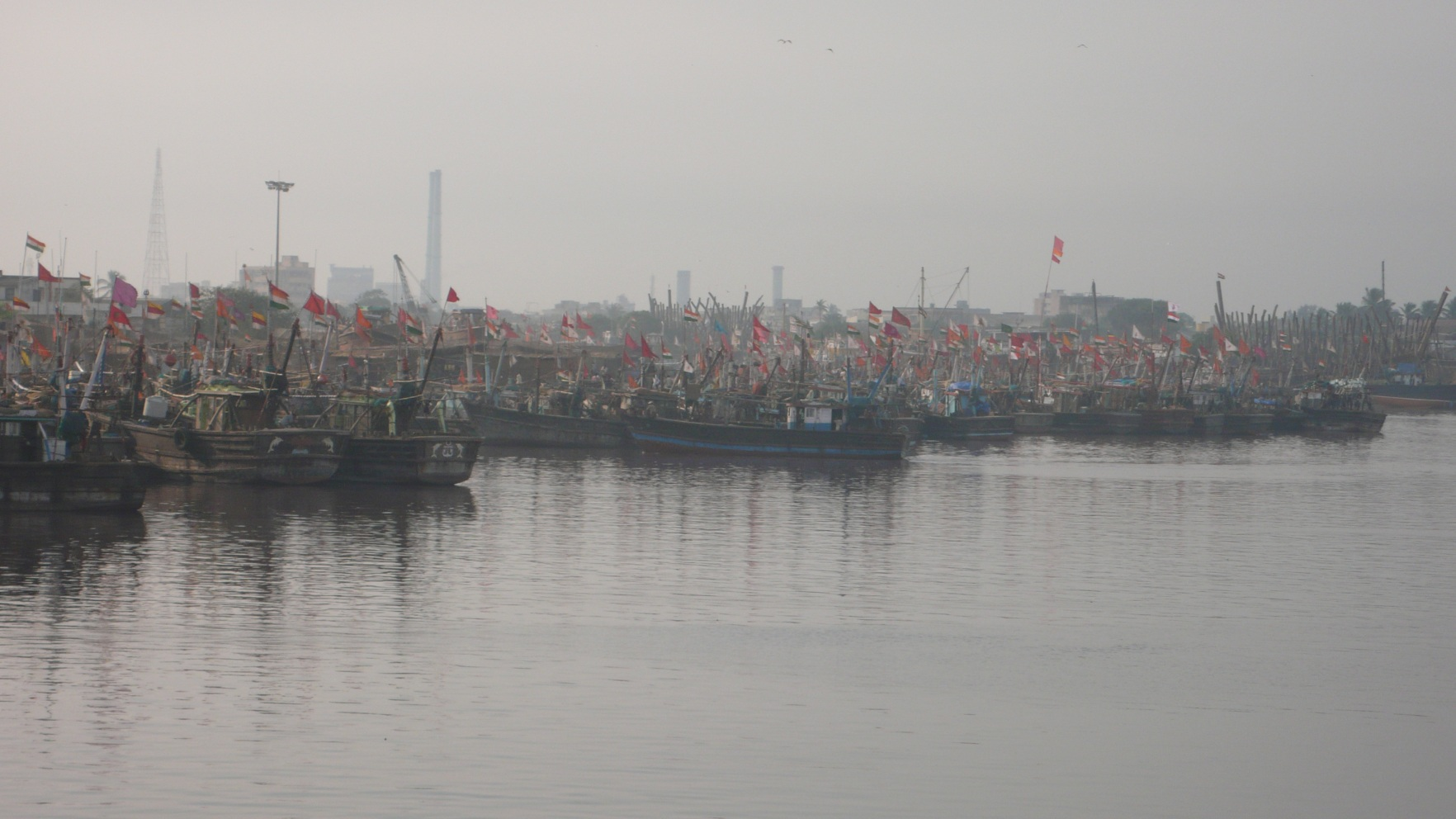
Veraval Fishery Harbour

Fisheries have always been the main industries in the town and are dominated by the Kharwas (fisherfolk). The fishing is done mostly on traditional boats and trawlers. Veraval also has a large boat making industry. Veraval is home to a large number of fish processing factories in Gujarat Industrial Development Corporation (GIDC) which export prime quality seafood to USA, Japan, SE Asian, Gulf and EU Countries. The seafood-industry which was started through government initiative now is in its prime and many importers are attracted towards Veraval from around the globe. Regional research centers of CIFT and CMFRI situated at Veraval have done Yeoman service in development of fisheries sector in Gujarat.

Veraval also is home to Grasim Industries limited (Unit - Indian Rayon) which is one of India's largest rayon manufacturing companies.

There are various chemical, thread and cement companies around Veraval which provide employment to the local youth. The major ones being Indian Rayon Unit of Grasim industries limited, Gujarat Ambuja Cement Ltd, Gujarat Siddhee Cement Ltd and Gujarat Heavy Chemicals Ltd.

Kharwa and Patni Jamat, a local inhabitants have flourished as main seafood exporter after the 1990s. They have a very good hold on the fishing business. Seafaring dhows and wooden fishing boats are still built by the fishermen without the use of any modern technology.

== Culture ==
Veraval's culture reflects its long maritime history, coastal geography, and religious diversity. Located on the Arabian Sea in the Saurashtra region of Gujarat, the city has historically been influenced by seafaring communities, regional trade, and the Somnath temple complex, one of the most important pilgrimage centres in India.

=== Religious and social life ===
The cultural life of Veraval is characterised by the coexistence of multiple religious communities, primarily Hindus and Muslims, along with Jain minorities. This pluralistic social structure has been documented in district gazetteers and official records. Temples, mosques, and Jain derasars serve as important religious and social institutions within the city.

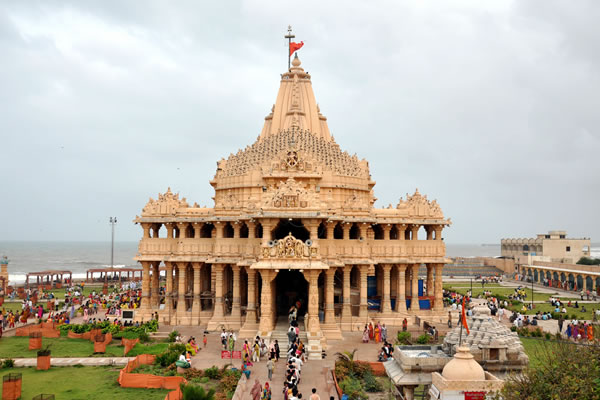
Somnath Temple

The Somnath Temple has played a central role in shaping the city's cultural identity. Pilgrimage activity associated with the temple has historically influenced local traditions, festivals, and occupations, and form a cultural and economic zone.

Veraval is also closely associated with Bhalka Tirtha, a Hindu pilgrimage site traditionally believed to be the place where Lord Krishna was struck by an arrow at the end of his earthly life. The site forms an integral part of the Krishna pilgrimage circuit and attracts devotees throughout the year.

The Triveni Sangam, located near Somnath temple, is a sacred confluence traditionally identified with the meeting of the Hiran, Kapila, and the now-extinct Saraswati rivers. The site holds religious significance in Hindu tradition and is closely associated with pilgrimage rituals connected to Somnath.

The Chandrabhaga Shakti Peeth, locally called Mahakali Temple, located near the Arabian Sea, is regarded in Hindu tradition as one of the sacred Shakta pithas. It is believed that Goddess Sati's stomach fell here. The site holds religious significance and is associated with goddess worship, contributing to the broader religious landscape.

=== Festivals ===
Major Hindu festivals such as Navratri, Diwali, Janmashtami, and Makar Sankranti (Uttarayan) are widely celebrated in Veraval. Navratri is marked by traditional garba and dandiya raas dances. Muslim festivals including Eid al-Fitr and Eid al-Adha are also observed, reflecting the city's religious diversity and communal traditions.

Religious fairs and events connected with Somnath temple attract pilgrims and visitors throughout the year and contribute to Veraval's cultural calendar and local economy.

=== Language and customs ===
Gujarati is the principal language spoken in Veraval, mainly in the Saurashtra dialect. Hindi is also commonly used, particularly in trade, fishing-related activities, and everyday communication among different communities. Traditional customs related to dress, marriage ceremonies, and religious observances continue to be practiced, especially in older parts of the city.

=== Maritime and fishing heritage ===
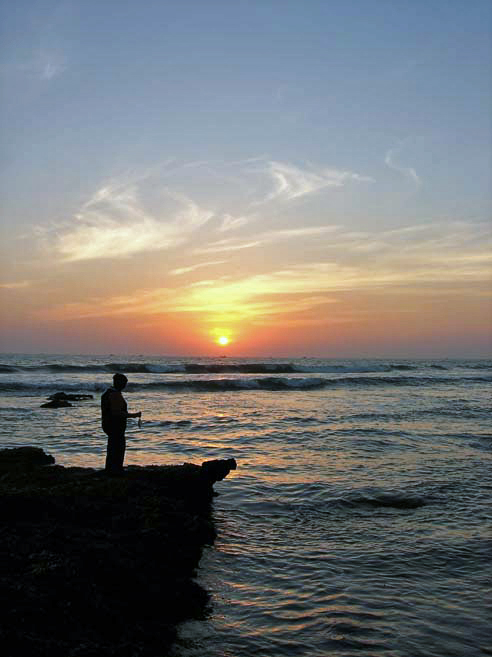
Veraval Beach

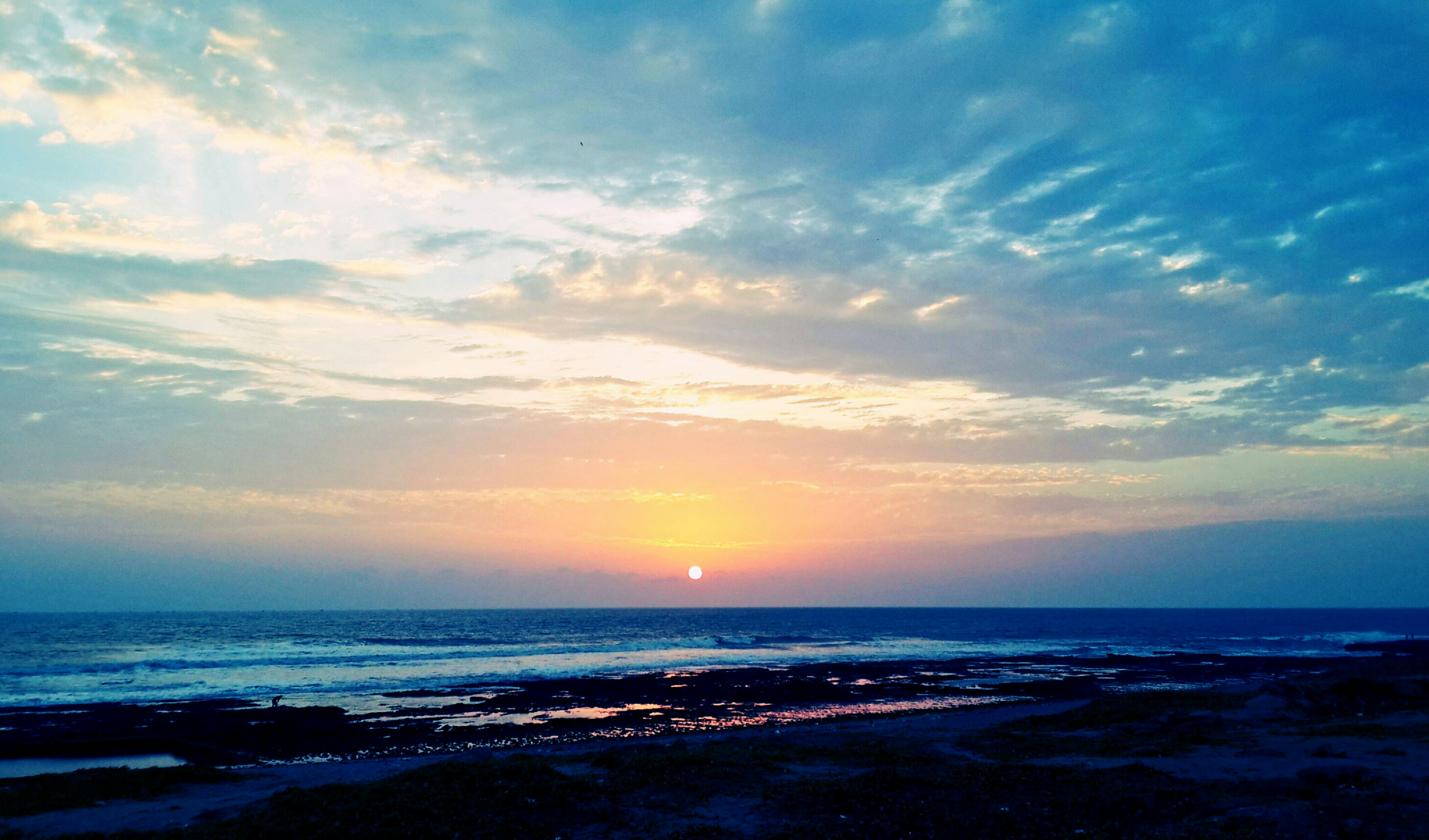
Sunset at Veraval Beach

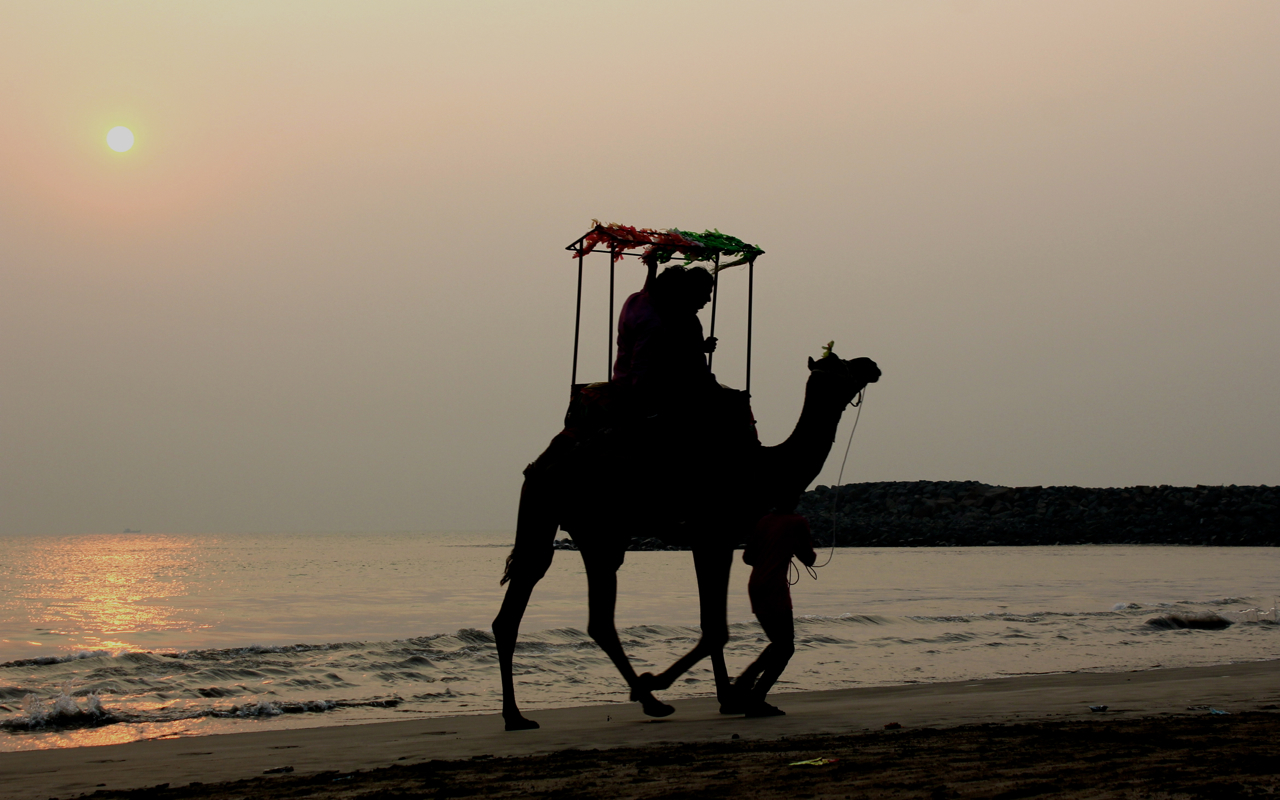
Camel on the beach

Veraval is one of Gujarat's major fishing ports, and its coastal culture is closely linked to marine occupations. Fishing communities maintain distinct social traditions, seasonal rituals, and occupational practices connected with the sea. The fishing harbour, markets, and fish-processing activities form an integral part of daily life and cultural identity in the city.

=== Cuisine ===
The cuisine of Veraval reflects its coastal environment and multicultural population. Seafood dishes are prominent alongside traditional Gujarati vegetarian food. Spiced fish preparations, dried fish products, and street foods influenced by both Gujarati and Muslim culinary traditions are commonly associated with the city and surrounding coastal region.

=== Arts and daily life ===
Cultural expression in Veraval is largely community-based and includes folk traditions, devotional music, and religious performances. While the city is not a major centre for classical arts, everyday life reflects a blend of religious practice, port-based commerce, and tourism linked to the Somnath temple and the Arabian Sea coastline.

== Transport ==
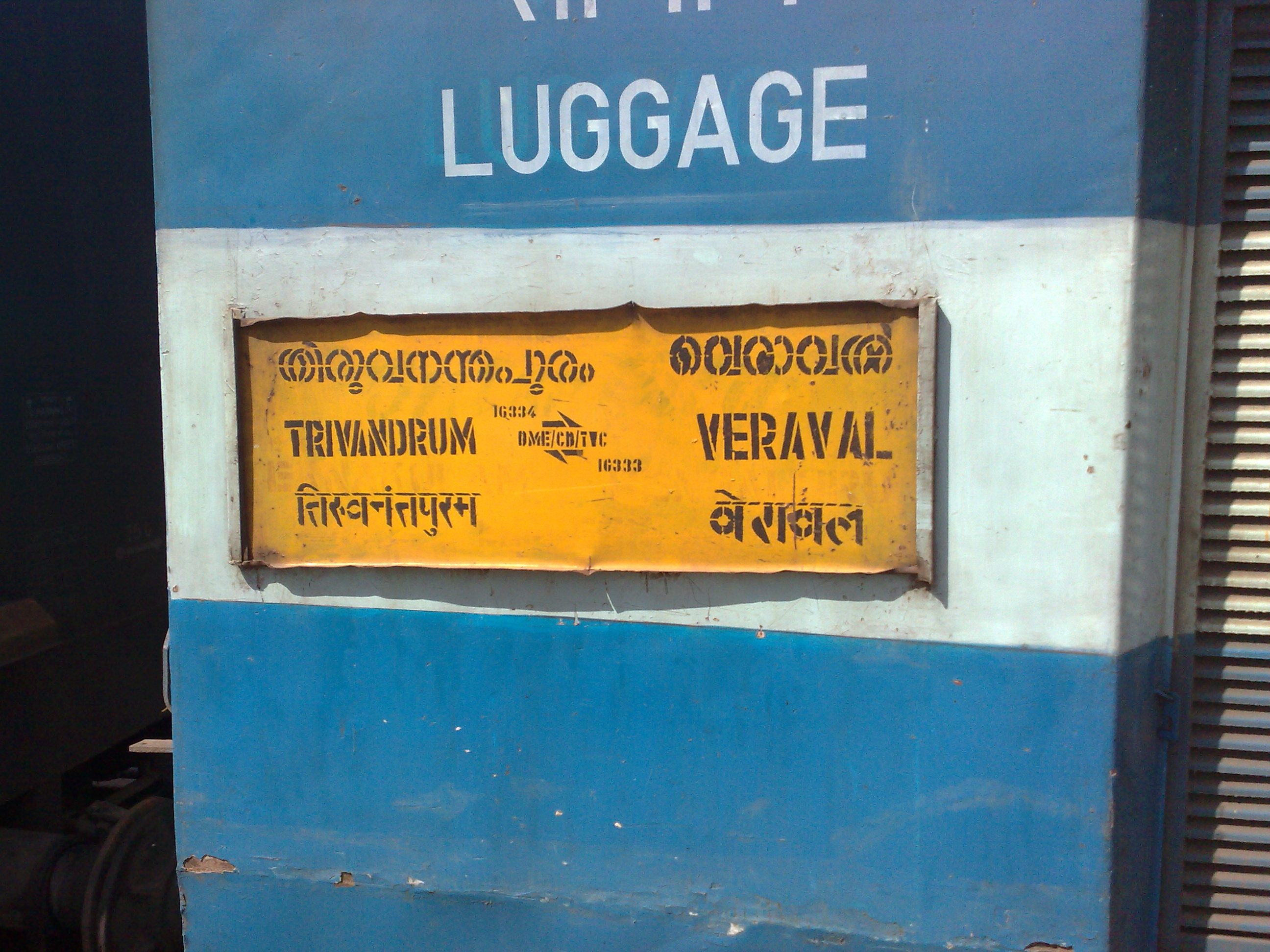
Thiruvananthapuram Veraval Express

The city has two railway stations namely Veraval Junction and Somnath Terminus. Veraval Junction is a fairly busy railway junction station for Western Railways and is served by more than 14 pairs of regional and long-distance trains.

Daily (or multiple daily) trains connect it to major cities in Gujarat such as Ahmedabad, Bharuch, Jamnagar, Junagadh, Porbandar, Rajkot, Surat and Vadodara.

Daily connections are also available to many other towns in Gujarat such as Keshod, Jetalsar, Gondal, Wankaner, Surendranagar, Viramgam, Nadiad, Anand, Valsad, Vapi, Dahod and Godhra.

Daily long-distance trains connect Veraval to several cities in India including Bhopal, Jabalpur, Itarsi, Ratlam, Ujjain, Indore and Mumbai.

Pune, Varanasi, Trivandrum, Kochi, Kollam, Kottayam, Thrissur, Kozhikode, Kannur, Mangalore, Karwar, Madgaon, Ratnagiri and Panvel are some of the cities connected by weekly long-distance trains.

The nearest airports are Diu, Keshod And Rajkot. Daily Flights connect Diu and Keshod to Mumbai.

== Notable people ==
- Khusrau Khan - 16th Sultan of Delhi
- Pushpaben Mehta - An Indian social worker
- Poonja Gokuldas Meghji - businessman and the grandfather of Muhammad Ali Jinnah
- Pankaj Advani - Bollywood film director and producer

== See also ==
- Somnath temple
- Jyotirlinga
- Gir National Park
- Bhalka Tirth
- Veraval Lighthouse
- List of cities in India
