= Patni Jamat =

Regions with significant populations
- • India • Pakistan

Languages
- • Gujarati • Hindi • Kathiawari • Kutchi • English

Religion
- Sunni Islam

Related ethnic groups
- • Gujarati Muslims • Memon • Khoja • Bohra

The Patni are a community found in the states of Gujarat and Maharashtra in India and Sindh in Pakistan.

In India, they are given the reservations and were regarded as Other Backward Class by the Central Government as of 2015.
