= Vataman =

Village in Gujarat, India

Vataman Laghuraj Nagar
- town
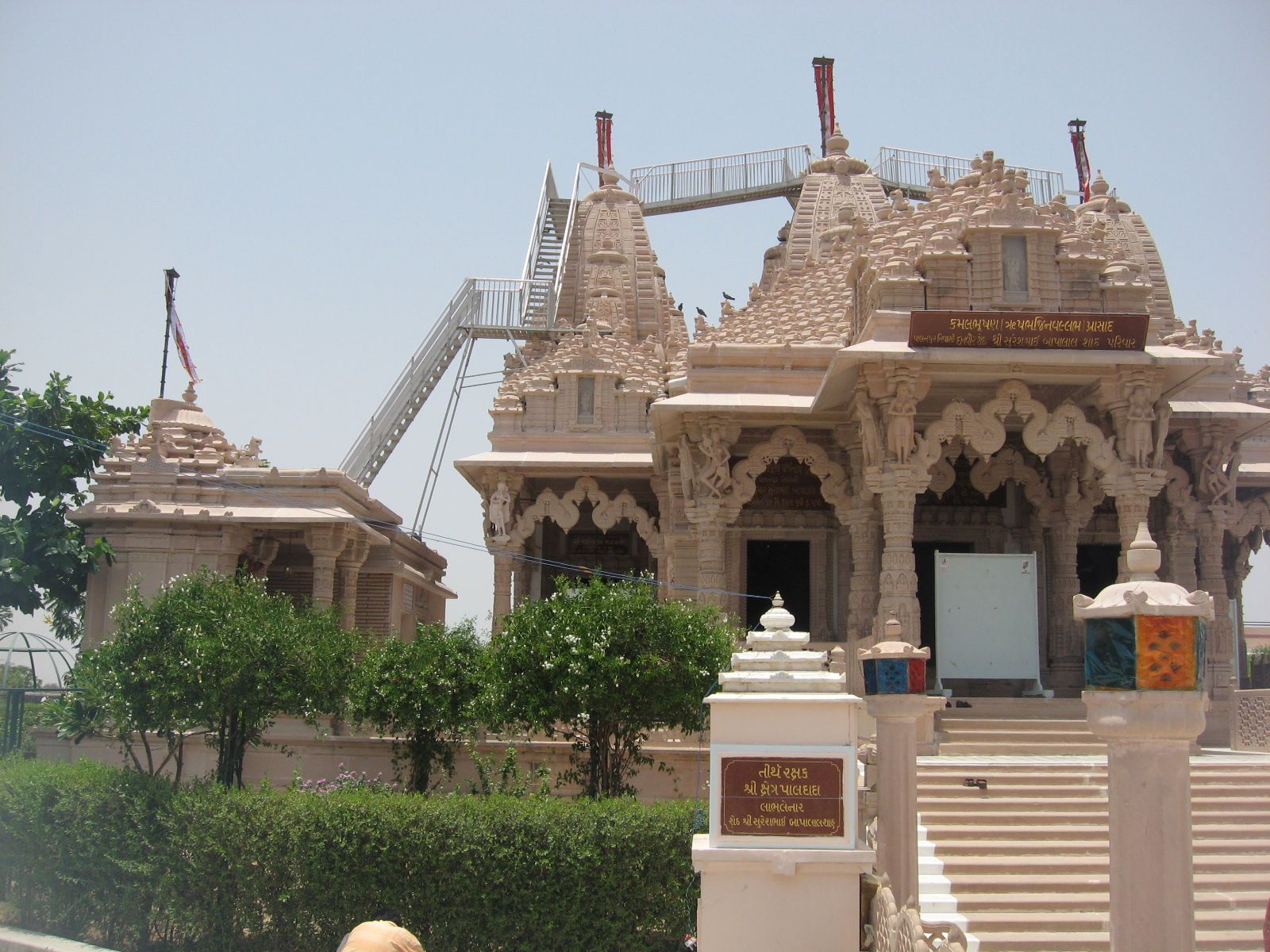
- Vataman Temple
- Nickname: Vatamanu
- Location in Gujarat, India Vataman (India)
- Coordinates: 22.53°N 72.42°E
- Country: India
- State: Gujarat
- District: Ahmedabad
- Taluka: Dholka

Population (2001)
  - Total: 5,906
  - Rank: 2nd in Dholka

Languages
  - Official: Gujarati, Hindi
- Time zone: UTC+5:30 (IST)
- PIN: 382265
- Vehicle registration: GJ
- Nearest city: Dholka
- Literacy: 9%
- Website: gujaratindia.com

Vataman or Vataman Chowkdi is a small village in the western state of Gujarat in India, located at a crossroads about an hour and a half from Ahmedabad or Amdavad airport on the road to Palitana. Vataman is famous for its Jain derasar. Vataman village is famous for guava fruit many cast of people live in vataman like rajput, garasiya, Devipujak Samaj, Koli patel, bharavad, etc. The cast of Garasiya are Gohil and The cast of Rajputs are Barad, Dabhi, Rathod, Parmar, Chavda, etc. Vataman village is also famous for temples like Ranmukteshwar Mahadev temple, Swaminarayan temple, Ramji Mandir, Laghurajswami temple, Bhathavali Meldi Maa temple etc. and Khedut Bazar mini mall(agro) also situated at Vataman Chowkadi by Hathisang Bhikhubha Barad and Barad Krupalsinh Hathisang.

== Demographics ==
In the 2001 India census, the village of Vataman had 5,906 inhabitants, 51.9% (3,067) male and 48.1% (2,839) female, for a gender ratio of 926 females per thousand males.

== Jain Temple ==
This Jain temple is dedicated to the Bhagwan (Lord) Adinath or Rishabha that was consecrated with great fanfare and devotion by Anilaben and Sureshbhai Bapalalbhai Shah of Palanpur and Mumbai in April 2003. The main temple also houses statues of Rishabhanatha, Mahavira swami, Parshvanath swami, Vasupujya swami and Kunthunath swami. This temple belongs to the Śvetāmbara sect of Jainism.

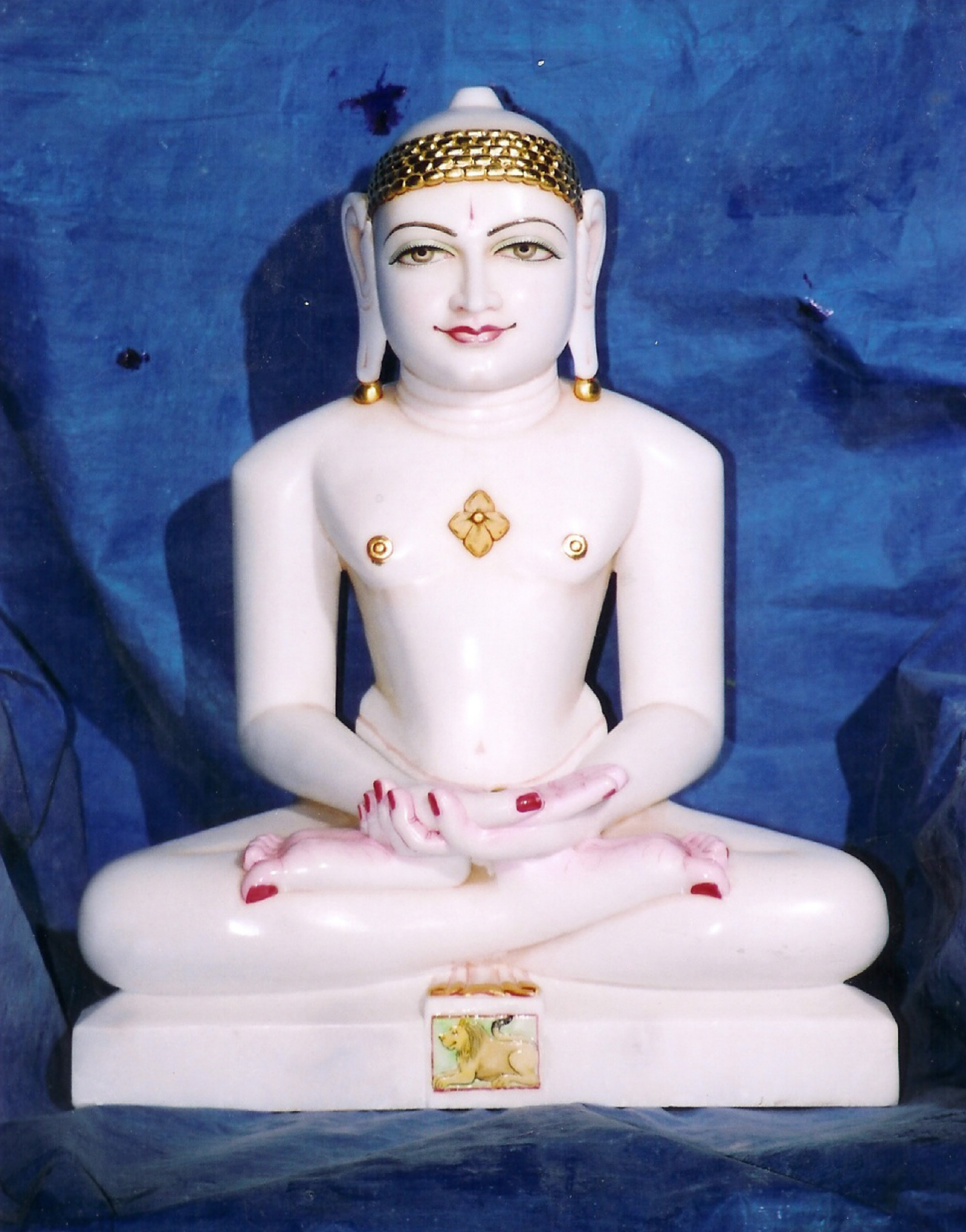
Mahavir bhagwan

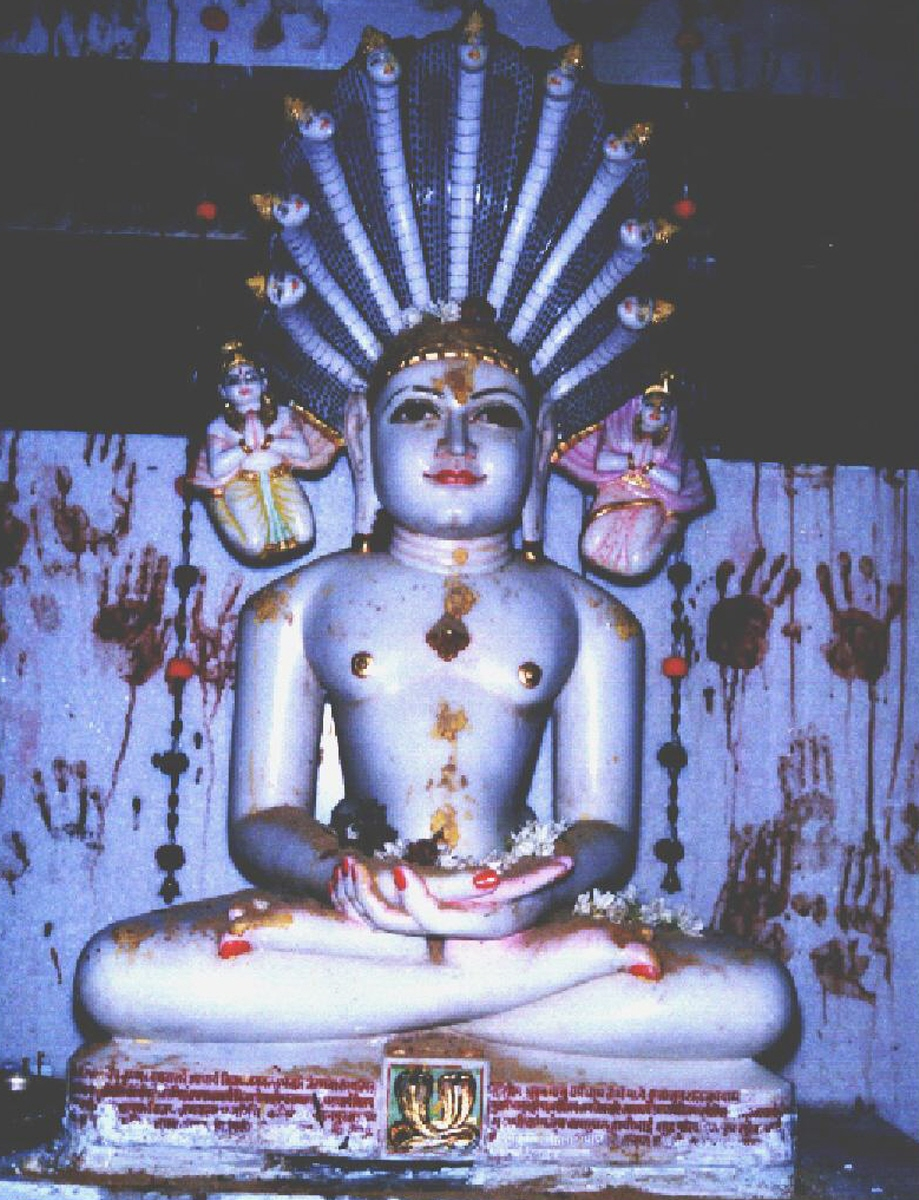
Parshvanath bhagwan

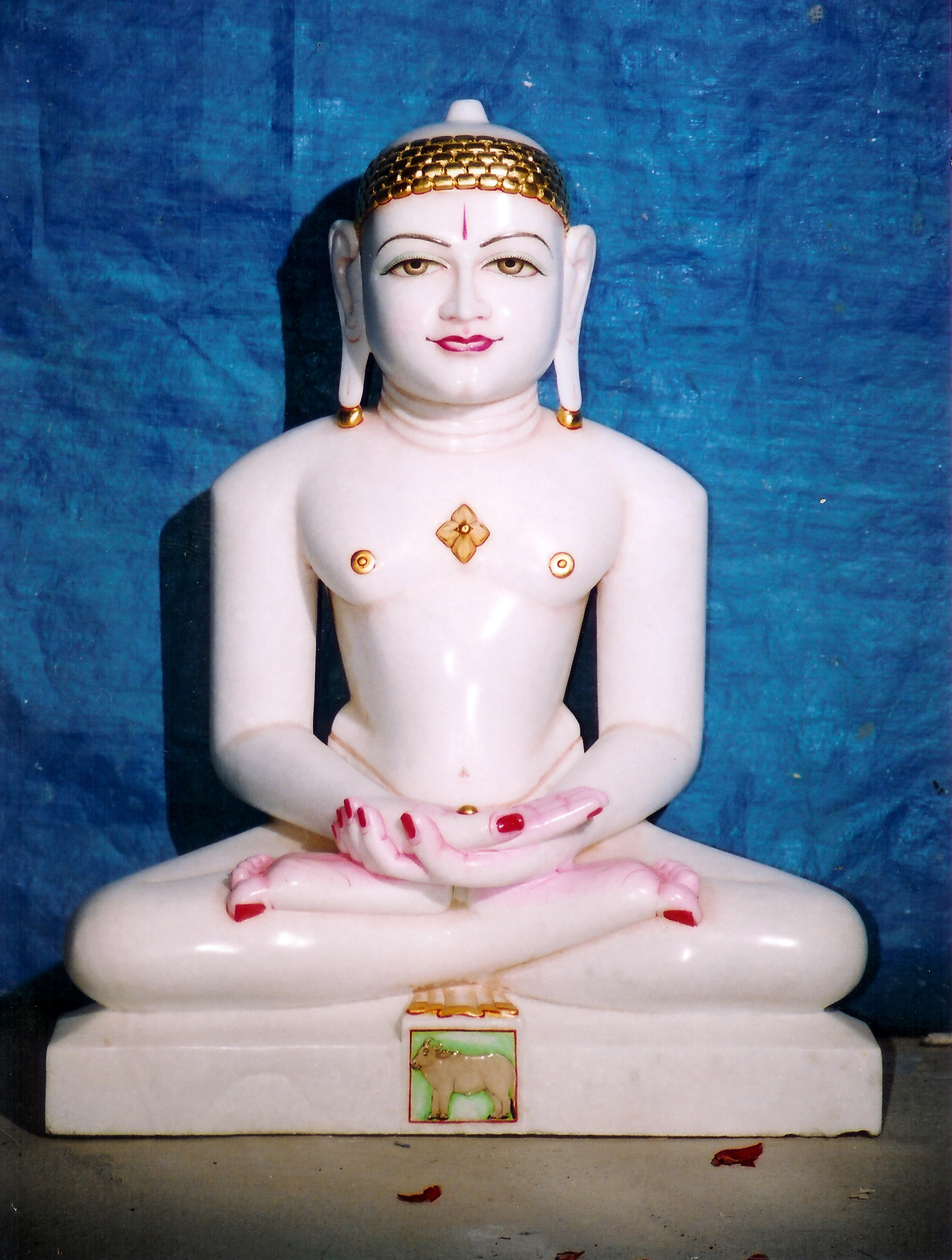
Vasupujya bhagwan

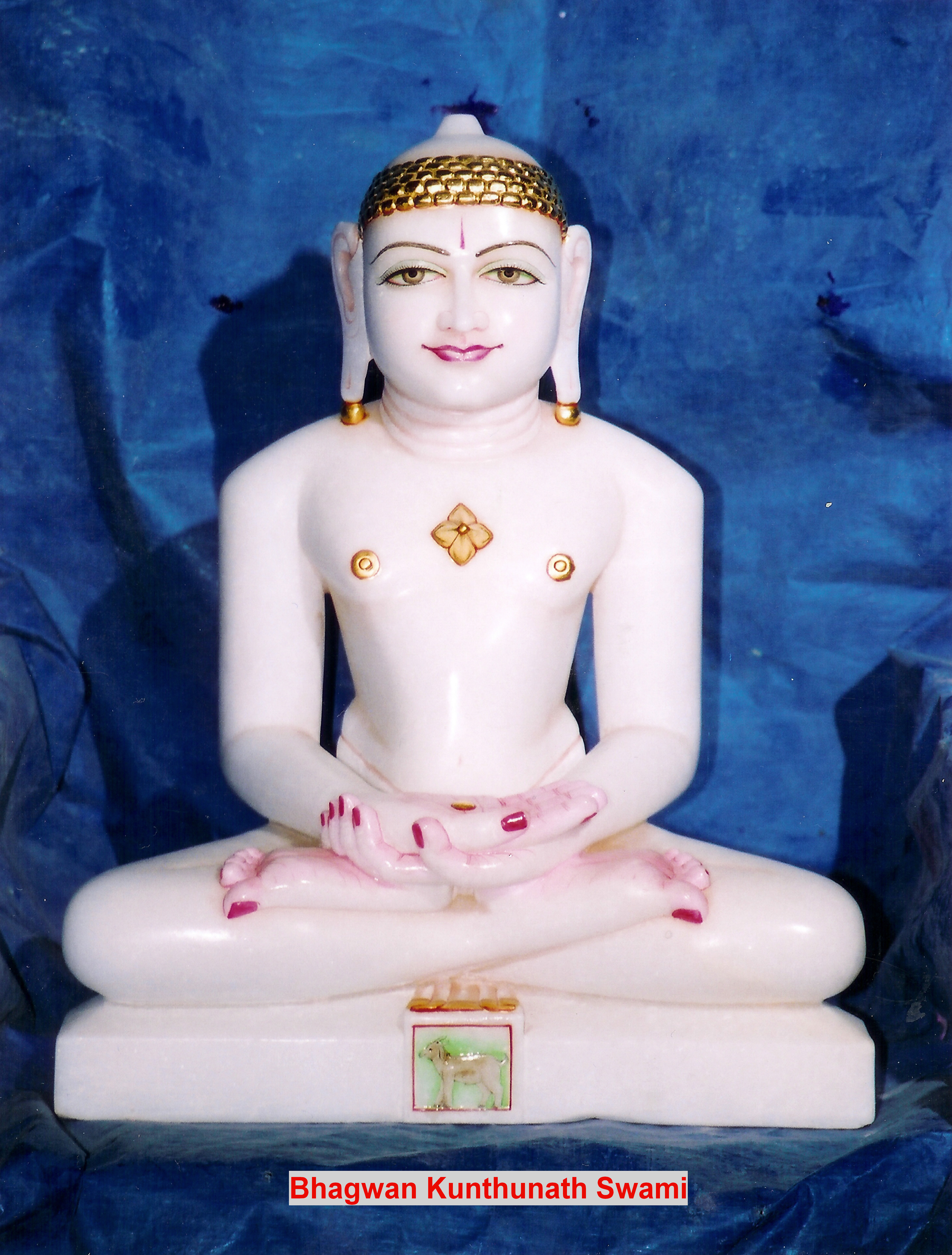
Kunthunath bhagwan
