= National Highway 51 (India) =

National Highway of India

National Highway 51
- Map of National Highway 51 in red

Route information
- Length: 790 km (490 mi)

Major junctions
- From: Beyt Dwarka, Gujarat
- To: Bhavnagar, Gujarat

Location
- Country: India
- States: Gujarat
- Primary destinations: Okha - Dwarka - Bhogat - Gandhvi - Porbandar - Mangrol - Veraval - Somnath - Kodinar - Dolasa - Una - Pipavav - Mahuva - Bhavnagar - Sihor - Gadhada - Botad - Limbdi - Surendranagar - Dhrangadhra.

Highway system
- Roads in India; Expressways; National; State; Asian
← NH 50	→ NH 52

National Highway 51 (NH 51) is an Indian National Highway entirely within the state of Gujarat. This Highway links Beyt Dwarka with Dhrangadhra and is covering 790 km (490 mi) long distance. Old Number of this Highway was National Highway 8E (NH 8E)

== Route ==
Bet Dwarka including Signature Bridge, Okha, Dwarka, Bhogat, Gandhvi, Porbandar, Mangrol, Veraval, Somnath, Kodinar, Dolasa, Una, Pipavav, Mahuva, Bhavnagar, Sihor, Gadhada, Botad, Limbdi, Surendranagar, Dhrangadhra. This Highway is mostly 4 lane with 4 lanning going on last 114 km (71 mi) stretch.

== See also ==
- List of national highways in India
- National Highways Development Project
