= 2010 renumbering of national highways in India =

On 28 April 2010, the Ministry of Road Transport and Highways officially notified the rationalized number system of the national highway network in the Gazette of the Government of India. It is a systematic numbering scheme based on the orientation and the geographic location of the highway. This was adopted to ensure more flexibility and consistency in the numbering of existing and new national highways. According to the system all north–south oriented highway will have even numbers increasing from the east to the west. Similarly all east–west oriented highways will be odd numbered increasing from the north to the south of the country.

The longest National Highway in new numbering scheme is National Highway 44.

The longest National Highway under the old numbering scheme was the NH 7 which was from Varanasi to Kanyakumari passing through Uttar Pradesh, Madhya Pradesh, Maharashtra, Telangana, Andhra Pradesh, Karnataka and Tamil Nadu covering a distance of 4,572 km (2,841 mi), as of Sep 2011 as per National Highways Authority of India. The shortest National Highway was the NH 47A (5.9 km (3.7 mi)), which connected Kundanoor Junction of Maradu in Kochi city to the Kochi port at Willingdon Island. India has the distinction of having the world's highest drivable highway connecting Manali to Leh in Ladakh, Kashmir.

The table below shows the list of National Highways, prior to their renumbering in 2010–11 and their newly assigned numbers. For the list of current highway numbers see List of national highways in India.

== List of highways ==
Old NH No.	Route	Length in State (km)	Total Length	New NH No.
1	Delhi – Ambala – Jalandhar – Amritsar – Indo-Pak Border	Delhi (22), Haryana (180), Punjab (254)	456 km (283 mi)	NH 3 / NH 44
1A	Jalandhar – Madhopur – Jammu – Udhampur – Banihal – Srinagar – Baramulla – Uri	Punjab (108), Himachal Pradesh (14), Jammu & Kashmir (541)	663 km (412 mi)	NH 1/NH 44
1B	Batote – Doda – Kishtwar – Symthan pass – Khanbal	Jammu & Kashmir (274)	274 km (170 mi)	NH 244
1C	Domel – Katra	Jammu & Kashmir (8)	8 km (5.0 mi)	NH 144
1D	Srinagar – Kargil – Leh	Jammu & Kashmir (), Ladakh ()	422 km (262 mi)	NH 1
2	Delhi – Mathura – Agra – Etawah – Auraiya – Akbarpur – Sachendi – Panki – Kanpur – Chakeri – Allahabad – Varanasi – Mohania – Barhi – Dhanbad – Asansol – Palsit – Dankuni	Delhi (12), Haryana (74), Uttar Pradesh (752), Bihar (202), Jharkhand (190), West Bengal (235)	1,465 km (910 mi)	NH 19 / NH 27 / NH 44
2A	Sikandra – Bhognipur	Uttar Pradesh (25)	25 km (16 mi)	NH 519
2B	Bardhaman – Bolpur	West Bengal (52)	52 km (32 mi)	NH 114
2B Ext	The highways starting from Bolpur connecting Prantik, Mayureswar and terminating at Mollarpur at the junction of NH-60	West Bengal (54)	54 km (34 mi)	
2C	Dehri – Akbarpur – Jadunathpur – Bihar/UP Border	Bihar (105)	105 km (65 mi)	NH 119
3	Agra – Dholpur – Morena – Gwalior – Shivpuri – Guna, India – Indore – Dhule – Nashik – Thane – Mumbai	Uttar Pradesh (26), Rajasthan (32), Madhya Pradesh (712), Maharashtra (391)	1,161 km (721 mi)	NH 27 / NH 44 / NH 46 / NH 48 / NH 52 / NH 60
3A	Dholpur – Bharatpur		75 km (47 mi)	NH 123
4	Junction with NH 3 near – New.Delhi -Gurugram -Manesar-Bhiwadi -Kotputli -Jaipur -Ajmer -Bhilwar -Chittorgarh -Udaipur -Himatnagar -Ahmedabad -Nadiad -Anand -Vadodara -Bhuruch -Surat -Vapi -Vasai Virar -Thane -Panvel -Lonavala -Pune -Satara- Kolhapur – Belgaum – Hubli – Davangere – Chitradurga – Tumkur – Bangalore – Kolar – Chittoor – Ranipet – Walajapet – Chennai	Delhi – Haryana – Rajasthan – Gujarat – Maharashtra Karnataka Andhra Pradesh Tamil Nadu	km|1.744 mi)	NH 40 / NH 48 / NH 69 / NH 75
4A	Belgaum – Anmod – Ponda – Panaji	Karnataka (82), Goa (71)	153 km (95 mi)	NH 748
4B	Jawahar Lal Nehru Port Trust near KM 109 – Palspe	Maharashtra (20)	20 km (12 mi)	NH 348
4C	NH-4 near Kalamboli at KM 116 junction with NH-4B near KM 16.687	Maharashtra (7)	7 km (4.3 mi)	NH 548
5	Junction with NH 6 near Baharagora -Baripada- Cuttack – Bhubaneswar – Visakhapatnam – Eluru – Vijayawada – Guntur – Ongole – Nellore – Gummidipoondi – Chennai	Odisha (488), Andhra Pradesh (1000), Tamil Nadu (45)	1,533 km (953 mi)	NH 18 / NH 16
5A	Junction with NH 5 near Haridaspur – Paradip Port	Odisha(77)	77 km (48 mi)	NH 53
6	Hazira – Surat – Dhule – Jalgaon – Akola – Amravati – Nagpur – Durg – Raipur – Sambalpur – Baharagora – Kharagpur – Howrah – Kolkata	Gujarat (177), Maharashtra (813), Chhattisgarh (314), Odisha (462), Jharkhand (22), West Bengal (161)	1,949 km (1,211 mi)	NH 18 / NH 16 / NH 49
7	Varanasi – Mangawan – Rewa – Jabalpur – Lakhnadon – Nagpur – Hyderabad – Kurnool – Chikkaballapur – Bangalore – Hosur – Krishnagiri – Dharmapuri – Salem – Namakkal – Karur – Dindigul – Madurai – Virudunagar – Tirunelveli – Kanyakumari	Uttar Pradesh (128), Madhya Pradesh (504), Maharashtra (232), Andhra Pradesh (753), Karnataka (125), Tamil Nadu (627)	2,369 km (1,472 mi)	NH 30 / NH 34 / NH 35 / NH 44 / NH 48 / NH 135
7A	Palayamkottai – Tuticorin Port	Tamil Nadu (51)	51 km (32 mi)	NH 138
8	Delhi – Jaipur – Ajmer – Udaipur – Ahmedabad – Vadodara – Surat – Mumbai	Delhi (13), Haryana (101), Rajasthan (635), Gujarat (498), Maharashtra (128)	1,428 km (887 mi)	NH 48 / NH 58 / NH 64 / NH 448
8A	Ahmedabad – Limbdi – Morvi – Kandla – Mandvi – Vikhadi – Kothra – Naliya – Narayan Sarover	Gujarat (618)	618 km (384 mi)	NH 41 / NH 141 / NH 47 / NH 27
8B	Bamanbore – Rajkot – Porbunder	Gujarat (206)	206 km (128 mi)	NH 27
8C	Chiloda – Gandhinagar – Sarkhej	Gujarat (46)	46 km (29 mi)	NH 147
8D	Jetpur – Somnath	Gujarat (127)	127 km (79 mi)	NH 151
8E	Bhavnagar – Somnath – Porbunder- Dwarka	Gujarat (445)	445 km (277 mi)	NH 51
NE1	Ahmedabad – Vadodara Expressway	Gujarat (93)	93 km (58 mi)	
9	Pune – Solapur – Hyderabad-Suryapet-Vijayawada – Machillipatnam	Maharashtra (336), Karnataka (75), Andhra Pradesh (430)	841 km (523 mi)	NH 65
10	Delhi – Rohtak – Hissar – Fatehabad – Sirsa – Fazilka – Indo-Pak Border	Delhi (18), Haryana (313), Punjab (72)	403 km (250 mi)	NH 7 / NH 9
11	Agra – Jaipur – Bikaner	Uttar Pradesh (51), Rajasthan (531)	582 km (362 mi)	NH 11 / NH 21 / NH 52
11A	Manoharpur – Dausa – Lalsot – Kothum	Rajasthan (145)	145 km (90 mi)	NH 23 / NH 148
11B	Lalsot – Karauli – Dholpur	Rajasthan (180)	180 km (110 mi)	NH 23
11C	Old alignment of NH no. 8 passing through Jaipur from km 220 to 273.50	Rajasthan (53)	53 km (33 mi)	NH 248
12	Jabalpur – Bhopal – Khilchipur – Aklera – Jhalawar – Kota – Bundi – Devli – Tonk – Jaipur	Madhya Pradesh (490), Rajasthan (400)	890 km (550 mi)	NH 45 / NH 46 / NH 52
12A	Jhansi – Jabalpur – Mandla- Chilpi – Simga near Raipur	Madhya Pradesh (482), Chhattisgarh (128), Uttar Pradesh (7)	617 km (383 mi)	NH 30 / NH 34 / NH 539 / NH 934
13	Solapur – Bijapur – Hospet – Chitradurga – Shimoga – Mangalore	Maharashtra (43), Karnataka (648)	691 km (429 mi)	NH 48 / NH 50 / NH 52 / NH 67 / NH 69 / NH 369
14	Beawar – Sirohi – Radhanpur	Rajasthan (310), Gujarat (149)	450 km (280 mi)	NH 25 / NH 27 / NH 62 / NH 162
15	Pathankot – Amritsar – Tarn Taran Sahib – Bhatinda – Ganganagar – Bikaner – Jaisalmer – Barmer – Samakhiali	Punjab (350), Rajasthan (906), Gujarat (270)	1,526 km (948 mi)	NH 11 / NH 7 / NH 54 / NH 27 / NH 62
16	Nizamabad – Jagtial – Mancherial – Chinnur – Jagdalpur	Andhra Pradesh (220), Maharashtra (30), Chhattisgarh (210)	460 km (290 mi)	NH 30 / NH 63
17	Panvel – Pen – Nagothana – Indapur – Mangaon – Mahad – Poladpur – Khed – Chiplun – Sangameshwar – Ratnagiri – Lanja – Rajapur – Kharepatan – Vaibhavwadi – Kankavli – Kudal – Sawantwadi – Pernem – Mapusa – Panaji – Karwar – Udupi – Suratkal – Mangalore – Kasaragod – Kannur – Kozhikode – Ferokh – Kottakkal -Kuttippuram- Ponnani – Chavakkad – North Paravur Junction with NH 47 near Edapally at Kochi	Maharashtra (482), Goa (139), Karnataka (280), Kerala (368)	1,269 km (789 mi)	NH 66
17A	Junction with NH 17 near Cortalim – Murmugao	Goa (19)	19 km (12 mi)	NH 366
17B	Ponda – Verna – Vasco	Goa (40)	40 km (25 mi)	NH 566
18	Junction with NH 7 near Kurnool – Nandyal – Cuddapah – Junction with NH 4 near Chittoor	Andhra Pradesh (369)	369 km (229 mi)	NH 40
18A	Puthalapattu – Tirupati	Andhra Pradesh (50)	50 km (31 mi)	NH 140
19	Ghazipur – Balia – Patna	Bihar (120), Uttar Pradesh (120)	240 km (150 mi)	NH 31 / NH 22
20	Pathankot – Nurpur-Kangra-Nagrota Bagwan-Palampur-Baijnath-Joginder Nagar-Mandi	Punjab (10), Himachal Pradesh (210)	220 km (140 mi)	NH 154
20A	Junction with NH 20 in Nagrota – Ranital – Dehra – Junction with NH 70 in Mubarikpur	Himachal Pradesh (91)	91 km (57 mi)	NH 1 / NH 503
21	Junction with NH 22 near Chandigarh – Ropar – Bilaspur – Mandi – Kullu – Manali	Chandigarh (24), Punjab (67), Himachal Pradesh (232)	323 km (201 mi)	NH 3 / NH 154 / NH 205 / NH 5 / NH 7 / NH 303 / NH 503
21A	Pinjore – Nalagarh – Swarghat	Haryana (16), Himachal Pradesh (49)	65 km (40 mi)	NH 105
22	Ambala – Kalka – Solan – Shimla – Theog – Narkanda – Kumarsain – Rampur – Indo China Border near Shipkila	Haryana (30), Punjab (31), Himachal Pradesh (398)	459 km (285 mi)	NH 152 / NH 5
23	Chas – Bokaro – Ranchi – Rourkela – Talcher – Junction with NH 42	Jharkhand (250), Odisha (209)	459 km (285 mi)	NH 20 / NH 320 / NH 143 / NH 149 / NH 49
24	Delhi – Moradabad – Bareilly – Lucknow	Delhi (7), Uttar Pradesh (431)	438 km (272 mi)	NH 30 / NH 530 / NH 9
24A	Bakshi Ka Talab – CHINHAT (NH 28)	Uttar Pradesh (17)	17 km (11 mi)	NH 230
24B	Lucknow – Raebareli – Unchahar – Allahabad	Uttar Pradesh	185 km (115 mi)	NH 40
25	Lucknow – Unnao – Kanpur Barah – Jhansi – Shivpuri	Uttar Pradesh (270), Madhya Pradesh (82)	352 km (219 mi)	NH 27
25A	Km 19 (NH 25) – Bakshi Ka Talab	Uttar Pradesh (31)	31 km (19 mi)	NH 230
26	Jhansi – Lakhnadon	Uttar Pradesh (128), Madhya Pradesh (268)	396 km (246 mi)	NH 44
26A	Junction NH 26 in Sagar – Jeruwakhera – Khurai – Bina	Madhya Pradesh (75)	75 km (47 mi)	NH 30
26B	Junction NH 26 in Narsinghpur – Amarwara – Chhindwara – Savner via NH-69	Madhya Pradesh (195), Maharashtra (26)	221 km (137 mi)	NH 547
27	Allahabad – Mangawan	Uttar Pradesh (43), Madhya Pradesh (50)	93 km (58 mi)	NH 30 / NH 35
28	Junction with NH 31 Near Barauni – Muzaffarpur – Pipra – Kothi – Gorakhpur – Lucknow	Bihar (259), Uttar Pradesh (311)	570 km (350 mi)	NH 122 / NH 28 / NH 27
28A	Junction with NH 28 near Pipra – Kothi – Sagauli – Raxaul – Indo-Nepal Border	Bihar (68)	68 km (42 mi)	NH 257D
28B	Junction with NH 28A at Chhapra – Bettiah – Lauriya – Bagaha – Junction with NH 28 near Kushinagar	Bihar (121) Uttar Pradesh (29)	150 km (93 mi)	NH 727
28C	Junction with NH 28 nearBarabanki – Bahraich – Nepalganj	Uttar Pradesh (140)	184 km (114 mi)	NH 927
29	Varanasi – Ghazipur – Gorakhpur – Pharenda – Sunali	Uttar Pradesh (306)	306 km (190 mi)`	NH 27 / NH 24 / NH 31
30	Junction with NH 2 near Mohania – Arrah – Patna – Bakhtiarpur	Bihar (230)	230 km (140 mi)	NH 20 / NH 431 / NH 22 / NH 922 / NH 319 / NH 231 / NH 31 / NH 27 / NH 33
30A	Fatuha – Chandi – Harnaut – Barh	Bihar (65)	65 km (40 mi)	NH 431
31	Junction with NH 2 near Barhi – Bakhtiarpur – Mokameh – Purnea – Dalkhola – Siliguri – Sevok – Cooch Behar- North Salmara – Nalbari – Charali – Amingaon Junction with NH 37	Bihar (393), West Bengal (366), Assam (322), Jharkhand (44)	1,125 km (699 mi)	NH 10 / NH 117 / NH 517 / NH 717
31A	Sevok – Gangtok	West Bengal (30), Sikkim (62)	92 km (57 mi)	NH 10
31B	North Salmara – Junction with NH 37 near Jogighopa	Assam (19)	19 km (12 mi)	NH 17
31C	Near Galgalia – Bagdogra – Chalsa – Nagrakata – Goyerkata – Dalgaon – Hasimara – Rajabhat Khawa – Kochgaon – Sidili – Junction with NH 31 near Bijni	West Bengal (142), Assam (93)	235 km (146 mi)	NH 317
31D	Junction with NH 31 near Siliguri – Fulbari – Mainaguri – Dhupguri Falakata – Sonapur – Junction with NH 31C near Salsalabari	West Bengal (147)	147 km (91 mi)	NH 27
32	Junction with NH 2 near Gobindpur – Dhanbad – Chas – Jamshedpur	Jharkhand (107), West Bengal (72)	179 km (111 mi)	NH 118 / NH 18
33	Junction with NH 2 near Barhi – Ranchi – Jamshedpur Junction with NH 6 near Baharagora	Jharkhand (352)	352 km (219 mi)	NH 18 / NH 20
34	Junction with NH 31 near Dalkhola – Baharampur – Barasat – Dum Dum	West Bengal (443)	443 km (275 mi)	NH 12
35	Barasat – Bangaon – Petrapole on India–Bangladesh border	West Bengal (61)	61 km (38 mi)	NH 112
36	Nowgong – Dimapur (Manipur Road)	Assam (167), Nagaland (3)	170 km (110 mi)	NH 29 / NH 27
37	Junction with NH 31B near Goalpara – Guwahati – Jorabat – Kamargaon – Makum – Saikhoaghat – Roing	Assam (680) Arunachal Pradesh (60)	740 km (460 mi)	NH 2 / NH 115 / NH 17 / NH 127 / NH 27 / NH 715 / NH 15
37A	Kuarital – Junction with NH 52 near Tezpur	Assam (23)	23 km (14 mi)	NH 2
38	Makum – Ledo – Lekhapani	Assam (54)	54 km (34 mi)	NH 315
39	Numaligarh – Imphal – Pallel – Indo-Burma border	Assam (115), Nagaland (110), Manipur (211)	436 km (271 mi)	NH 2 / NH 102 / NH 129 / NH 29
40	Jorabat – Shillong – Bangladesh–India border near Dawki – Jowai	Meghalaya (216)	216 km (134 mi)	NH 6 / NH 106 / NH 206
41	Junction with NH 6 near Kolaghat – Tamluk – Haldia Port	West Bengal (51)	51 km (32 mi)	NH 116
42	Junction with NH 6 Sambalpur Angul Junction with NH 5 near Cuttack	Odisha (261)	261 km (162 mi)	NH 55
43	Raipur – Jagdalpur – Vizianagaram Junction with NH 5 near Natavalasa	Chhattisgarh (316), Odisha (152), Andhra Pradesh (83)	551 km (342 mi)	NH 63 / NH 26 / NH 30
44	Nongstoin – Shillong – Passi – Badarpur – Agartala – Sabroom	Meghalaya (277), Assam (111), Tripura (335)	723 km (449 mi)	NH 37 / NH 106 / NH 6 / NH 8
44A	Aizawl – Manu	Mizoram (165), Tripura (65)	230 km (140 mi)	
45	Chennai – Tambaram – Tindivanam – Villupuram – Trichy – Manapparai – Dindigul- Periyakulam – Junction with NH 49 near Theni	Tamil Nadu (472)	387 km (240 mi)	NH 183 / NH 32 / NH 83 / NH 132
45A	Villupuram – Pondicherry – Chidambaram – Nagapattinam	Tamil Nadu (147), Puducherry (43)	190 km (120 mi)	NH 32 / NH 332
45B	Trichy – Viralimalai – Melur – Madurai – Tuticorin	Tamil Nadu (257)	257 km (160 mi)	NH 38
45C	Junction with NH 67 near Thanjavur – Kumbakonam – Vriddhachalam – NH-45 near Ulundurpettai	Tamil Nadu (159)	159 km (99 mi)	NH 36
46	Krishnagiri – Ranipet – Walajapet	Tamil Nadu (132)	132 km (82 mi)	NH 48
47	Salem – Sankagiri – Chithode – Perundurai(Erode bypass) – Perumanallur – Avinashi – Coimbatore – Palghat – Trichur – Kochi – Alappuzha – Quilon – Trivandrum – Nagercoil – Kanyakumari	Tamil Nadu (224), Kerala (416)	640 km (400 mi)	NH 544 / NH 66
47A	Junction with NH 47 at Kundanoor – Willington Island in Kochi	Kerala (6)	6 km (3.7 mi)	NH 966B
47B	Junction with NH 47 at Nagercoil – Junction with NH 7 near Kavalkinaru	Tamil Nadu (45)	45 km (28 mi)	NH 944
47C	Junction with NH 47 at Kalamassery – Vallarpadom ICTT in Kochi	Kerala (17)	17 km (11 mi)	NH 966A
48	Bangalore – Hassan – Mangalore	Karnataka (328)	328 km (204 mi)	NH 73 / NH 75
49	Kochi – Madurai – Dhanushkodi	Tamil Nadu (290), Kerala (150)	440 km (270 mi)	NH 87 / NH 85
50	Chitradurga-Hosapete-Kushtagi-Hungud-mangoli-Vijayapura-Sindagi-Jevargi-Kalaburagi-Humnabad-Bidar	751.4 km	Km|466.9|Mi)	NH 60
51	Paikan – Tura – Dalu	Assam (22), Meghalaya (127)	149 km (93 mi)	NH 217
52	Baleguli-Yellapur-kalaghatgi-Hubli-Navalgund-Nargund-Gaddanakeri-Bilgi-Kolhar-Vijayapura-Zalki-Solapur-Tuljapur-Osmanabad-Beed-Aurangabad-Dhule-Sendhwa-Pithampur-Indore-Dewas-Shajapur-Biaor-Khilchipur-Aklura-Jhalwar-Kota-Tonk-Jaipur-Sikar-Fatehpur-Churu-Sadulpur-Hisar-Barwala-Narwana-Sangrur	Karnataka-Maharashtra-Madhyapradesh-Rajasthan-Hariyana	Km|1.440|Mi)	NH 515 / NH 13 / NH 15
52A	Banderdewa – Itanagar – Gohpur	Assam (15), Arunachal Pradesh (42)	57 km (35 mi)	NH 415
52B	Kulajan – Dibrugarh	Assam (31)	31 km (19 mi)	NH 15 / NH 215
53	Junction with NH 44 near Badarpur – Jirighat – Silchar – Imphal	Assam (100), Manipur (220)	320 km (200 mi)	NH 37
54	Dabaka – Lumding – Silchar – Aizawl – Tuipang	Assam (335), Mizoram (515)	850 km (530 mi)	NH 2 / NH 306 / NH 27
54A	Theriat – Lunglei	Mizoram (9)	9 km (5.6 mi)	NH 302
54B	Venus Saddle – Saiha	Mizoram (27)	27 km (17 mi)	NH 502
55	Siliguri – Darjeeling	West Bengal (77)	77 km (48 mi)	NH 110
56	Lucknow – Varanasi	Uttar Pradesh (285)	285 km (177 mi)	NH 31 / NH 731
56A	Chenhat(NH 28) – Km16(NH 56)	Uttar Pradesh (13)	13 km (8.1 mi)	NH 230
56B	Km15(NH 56) – km 6(NH 25	Uttar Pradesh ((19)	19 km (12 mi)	NH 230
57	Muzaffarpur – Darbhanga – Forbesganj – Purnea	Bihar (310)	310 km (190 mi)	NH 27
57A	Junction of NH 57 near Forbesganj – Jogbani	Bihar (15)	15 km (9.3 mi)	NH 527
58	Delhi – Ghaziabad – Meerut – Haridwar – Badrinath – Mana Pass	Uttar Pradesh (165), Uttarakhand (373)	538 km (334 mi)	NH 7 / NH 334 / NH 34
59	Ahmedabad – Godhra – Dhar – Indore – Raipur – Nuapada – Kharial – Baliguda – Surada – Asika – Hinjilicut – Brahmapur – Gopalpur-on-Sea	Gujarat (211), Madhya Pradesh (139), Chhattisgarh, Odisha (438)	1,735.5 km (1,078.4 mi)	NH 47
59A	Indore – Betul	Madhya Pradesh (264)	264 km (164 mi)	NH 47
60	Balasore – Kharagpur – Raniganj – Siuri – Moregram (junction at NH 34 )	Odisha (57), West Bengal (389)	446 km (277 mi)	NH 14 / NH 16
61	Kohima – Wokha – Mokokchung – Jhanji	Nagaland (220), Assam (20)	240 km (150 mi)	NH 2
62	Damra – Baghmara – Dalu	Assam (5), Meghalaya (190)	195 km (121 mi)	NH 217
63	Ankola – Hubli – Hospet – Gooty	Karnataka (370), Andhra Pradesh (62)	432 km (268 mi)	NH 50 / NH 52 / NH 67
64	Chandigarh – Rajpura – Patiala – Sangrur – Bhatinda – Dabwali	Punjab (256)	256 km (159 mi)	NH 7 / NH 54
65	Ambala – Kaithal – Hissar – Fatehpur – Jodhpur – Pali	Haryana (240), Rajasthan (450)	690 km (430 mi)	NH 62 / NH 152 / NH 58 / NH 52
66	Pondicherry – Tindivanam – Gingee – Thiruvannamalai – Krishnagiri	Puducherry (6), Tamil Nadu (208)	214 km (133 mi)	NH 32 / NH 77
67	Nagapattinam – Tiruchirapalli – Karur – Palladam – Coimbatore – Mettupalayam – Coonoor – Ooty – Gundlupet	Tamil Nadu (520), Karnataka (35)	555 km (345 mi)	NH 36 / NH 81 / NH 83 / NH 181
68	Ulundrupet – Chinnasalem – Kallakkurichchi – Attur – vazhapadi – Salem	Tamil Nadu (134)	134 km (83 mi)	NH 79
69	Nagpur – Obedullaganj	Maharashtra (55), Madhya Pradesh (295)	350 km (220 mi)	NH 46
69A	Multai – Seoni	Madhya Pradesh (158)	158 km (98 mi)	NH 47
70	Jalandhar – Hoshiarpur – Hamirpur – Dharmapur – Mandi	Himachal Pradesh (120), Punjab (50)	170 km (110 mi)	NH 3
71	Jalandhar – Moga – Sangrur -Jind- Rohtak – Rewari – Bawal	Punjab (130), Haryana (177)	307 km (191 mi)	NH 7 / NH 703 / NH 52 / NH 352
71A	Rohtak – Gohana – Panipat	Haryana (72)	72 km (45 mi)	NH 709
71B	Rewari – Dharuhera – Taoru – Sohna – Palwal	Haryana (74)	74 km (46 mi)	NH 919
72	Ambala – Nahan – Paonta Sahib – Dehradun – Haridwar	Haryana (50), Himachal Pradesh (50), Uttarakhand (100)	200 km (120 mi)	NH 7 / NH 344
72A	Chhutmalpur – Biharigarh – Dehradun	Uttarakhand (15), Uttar Pradesh (30)	45 km (28 mi)	NH 307
73	Roorkee – Saharanpur – Yamuna Nagar – Saha – Panchkula	Haryana (108), Uttar Pradesh (59), Uttarakhand (21)	188 km (117 mi)	NH 7 / NH 344
74	Haridwar – Najibabad – Nagina – Dhampur- Kashipur – Kichha – Pilibhit – Bareilly	Uttar Pradesh (147), Uttarakhand (153)	300 km (190 mi)	NH 734
75	Bantwal-Uppinangadi-Sakleshpur-Alur-Hassan-Channarayapattana-Kunigal-Nelamangala-Bengaluru-Hoskote-Kolar-Mulbagal-Venkatagirikota-Pernambut-Gudiyatham-Katpadi-Vellore	Karnataka-Andhra Pradesh-Tamil Nadu		
76	Pindwara – Udaipur – Mangalwar – Kota – Shivpuri – Jhansi – Banda – Allahabad	Madhya Pradesh (60), Uttar Pradesh (467), Rajasthan (480)	1,007 km (626 mi)	NH 3 / NH 339
77	Hajipur – Sitamarhi – Sonbarsa	Bihar (142)	142 km (88 mi)	
78	Katni – Shahdol – Surajpur – Jashpurnagar – Gumla	Madhya Pradesh (178), Chhattisgarh (356), Jharkhand (25)	559 km (347 mi)	
79	Ajmer – Nasirabad – Neemuch – Mandsaur – Indore	Madhya Pradesh (280), Rajasthan (220)	500 km (310 mi)	NH 156
79A	Kishangarh(NH 8) – Nasirabad(NH 79)	Rajasthan (35)	35 km (22 mi)	NH 48
80	Mokameh – Rajmahal – Farrakka	Bihar (200), Jharkhand (100), West Bengal (10)	310 km (190 mi)	NH 33
81	Kora – Katihar – Malda	Bihar (45), West Bengal (55)	100 km (62 mi)	NH 31
82	Gaya – Bihar Sharif – Mokameh	Bihar (130)	130 km (81 mi)	NH 120
83	Patna – Jahanabad – Gaya – Bodhgaya – Dhobi	Bihar (130)	130 km (81 mi)	NH 22
84	Arrah – Buxar	Bihar (60)	60 km (37 mi)	NH 922
85	Chappra – Gopalganj	Bihar (95)	95 km (59 mi)	NH 531
86	Kanpur – Ramaipur – Ghatampur – Chhatarpur – Sagar – Bhopal – Dewas	Uttar Pradesh (180), Madhya Pradesh (494)	674 km (419 mi)	NH 146
87	Rampur – Pantnagar – Haldwani – Nainital	Uttar Pradesh (32), Uttarakhand (51)	83 km (52 mi)	NH 109
88	Shimla – Bilaspur – Hamirpur – Nadaun – Kangra, Himachal Pradesh – Mataur, Himachal Pradash – NH 20	Himachal Pradesh (245)	245 km (152 mi)	NH 3 / NH 303 / NH 503
90	Baran – Aklera	Rajasthan (100)	100 km (62 mi)	NH 752
91	Ghaziabad – Aligarh – Eta – Kannauj – Bilhaur – Shivrajpur – Chobepur – Mandhana – Kalianpur – Rawatpur – Kanpur	Uttar Pradesh (405)	405 km (252 mi)	NH 34
92	Bhongaon – Etawah – Gwalior	Uttar Pradesh (75), Madhya Pradesh (96)	171 km (106 mi)	NH 719
93	Agra – Aligarh – Babrala – Chandausi – Moradabad	Uttar Pradesh (220)	220 km (140 mi)	NH 509
94	Rishikesh – Ampata – Tehri – Dharasu – Kuthanur – Yamunotri	Uttarakhand (160)	160 km (99 mi)	NH 134
95	Kharar(Chandigarh) – Ludhiana – Jagraon – Ferozepur	Punjab (225)	225 km (140 mi)	NH 5
96	Faizabad – Sultanpur – Pratapgarh – Allahabad	Uttar Pradesh (160)	160 km (99 mi)	NH 330
97	Ghazipur – Zamania – Saiyedraja	Uttar Pradesh (45)	45 km (28 mi)	NH 24
98	Patna – Aurangabad – Rajhara	Bihar (156), Jharkhand (51)	207 km (129 mi)	NH 139
99	Dobhi – Chatra – Chandwa	Jharkhand (110)	110 km (68 mi)	NH 22
100	Chatra – Hazaribagh – Bagodar	Jharkhand (118)	118 km (73 mi)	NH 522
101	Chhapra – Baniapur – Mohammadpur	Bihar (60)	60 km (37 mi)	NH 331
102	Chhapra – Rewaghat – Muzaffarpur	Bihar (80)	80 km (50 mi)	NH 722
103	Hajipur – Mushrigharari	Bihar (55)	55 km (34 mi)	NH 322
104	Chakia – Sitamarhi – Jainagar – Narahia	Bihar (160)	160 km (99 mi)	NH 227
105	Darbhanga – Aunsi – Jainagar	Bihar (66)	66 km (41 mi)	NH 527B
106	Birpur – pipra – Madhepura – Bihpur	Bihar (130)	130 km (81 mi)	NH 131 / NH 131A
107	Maheshkhunt – Sonbarsa Raj – Simri Bakhtiyarpur – Bariahi – Saharsa – Madhepura – Purnea	Bihar (145)	145 km (90 mi)	NH 527B
108	Dharasu – Uttarkashi – Yamunotri – Gangotri Dham	Uttarakhand	127 km (79 mi)	NH 34
109	Rudraprayag – Guptkashi – Kedarnath Dham	Uttarakhand	76 km (47 mi)	NH 107
110	Junction with NH 98 – Arwal – Jehanabad – Bandhuganj – Kako – Ekangarsarai Bihar Sharif – Junction with NH 31	Bihar (89)	89 km (55 mi)	NH 33
111	Bilaspur – Katghora – Ambikapur-Surajpur on NH 78	Chhattisgarh (200)	200 km (120 mi)	NH 130
112	Bar Jaitaran – Bilara – Kaparda – Jodhpur – Kalyanpur- Pachpadra – Balotra – Tilwara – Bagundi – Dhudhwa – Madhasar – Barmer	Rajasthan (343)	343 km (213 mi)	NH 25
113	Nimbahera – Bari – Pratapgarh – Zalod – Dahod	Rajasthan (200), Gujarat (40)	240 km (150 mi)	NH 56
114	Jodhpur – Balesar – Dachhu – Pokaran	Rajasthan (180)	180 km (110 mi)	NH 125
116	Tonk – Uniara – Sawai Madhopur	Rajasthan (80)	80 km (50 mi)	NH 552
117	Haora – Bakkhali	West Bengal (119)	119 km (74 mi)	NH 12
119	Pauri – kotdwara-Najibabad-Bijnor- Meerut	Uttarakhand (135), Uttar Pradesh (125)	260 km (160 mi)0	NH 534
121	Kashipur – Bubakhal	Uttarakhand (252)	252 km (157 mi)	NH 309
123	Barkot – Vikasnagar	Uttarakhand (85), Himachal Pradesh (10)	95 km (59 mi)	NH 507
125	Sitarganj – Pithorgarh	Uttarakhand (201)	201 km (125 mi)	NH 9
150	Aizawl – Churachandpur – Imphal – Ukhrul – Jessami – Kohima	Manipur (523), Mizoram (141), Nagaland (36)	700 km (430 mi)	NH 2 / NH 202
*150A	Jevargi Shahapur Shorapur Lingasugur Maski Sindhanur Siruguppa Ballari Challakere Hiriyur Huliyar Kibbinahalli Bellur Nagamangala Pandavapura Srirangapattana Mysuru Nanjangud Chamarajanagara	618|Km	Km|384|Mi)	
*150E	Kalaburagi-Afzalpur-Akkalkot-Solapur-Vairag-Burshi	Karnataka-Maharashtra	KM|65|MI)	
151	Karimganj – Indo-Bangladesh border	Assam (14)	14 km (8.7 mi)	NH 37
152	Patacharkuchi – Bhutan-India Border	Assam (40)	40 km (25 mi)	NH 127A
153	Ledo – Lekhapani – Indo-Myanmar border	Assam (20), Arunachal Pradesh (40)	60 km (37 mi)	NH 315
154	Dhaleswar – Bairabi – Kanpui	Assam (110), Mizoram (70)	180 km (110 mi)	
155	Tuensang – Shamator – Meluri – Kiphire – Pfütsero	Nagaland (342)	342 km (213 mi)	NH 202
157	Kanpur – Raebareli – Sultanpur – Azamgarh – Siwan – Muzaffarpur	Uttar Pradesh (430), Bihar (151)	581 km (361 mi)	
160	Thane-Shahapura-Nashik-sinnar-Shirdi-Ahmednagar-Daund-Phaltan-Miraj-Kagwad-Chikkodi-Sankeshwar-	Karnataka Maharashtra		
167	Paramadevanahalli-Alur-Adoni-Madhavaram-Raichur-Shaktinagar-Marikal-Mahabubnagar-Kalwakurthy-Mallepalli-Peddavoora-Haliya-Tripuraram-Venkatadripelam-Maryalaguda-Hujurnagar-Kadad	Karnataka-Aandhrapradesh-Telangana	(183 km-300 mi)	
169	Mangalore-mudbidri-Bajagoly-Sanklapura-Hariharapura-Koppa-Thirthahalli-Gajanur-Shivamogga	Karnataka|215 km	(215.134 km|134Mi)	
169A	Udupi-Manipal-Hebri-Agumbe-Megaravalli-Thirthwhalli	Karnataka|87 km	57Mi)|	
173	Mudigere-Chikkamagaluru-Kadur	(72.10 km)	72.10 km|44.80Mi)	
200	Chhapra – Siwan – Gopalganj	Bihar (95)	95 km (59 mi)	
201	Borigumma – Bolangir – Bargarh	Odisha (310)	310 km (190 mi)	
202	Hyderabad – Warangal – Venkatapuram – Bhopalpatnam	Andhra Pradesh (244), Chhattisgarh (36)	280 km (170 mi)	NH 163
203	Bhubaneswar – Puri	Odisha (59)	59 km (37 mi)	
204	Ratnagiri – Pali – Sakharpa – Malakapur – Shahuwadi – Kolhapur – Sangli – Pandharpur – Solapur – Tuljapur – Latur – Nanded – Yavatmal – Wardha – Nagpur	Maharashtra (126)	974 km (605 mi)	NH 166
205	Anantpur – Renigunta – Chennai	Andhra Pradesh (360), Tamil Nadu (82)	442 km (275 mi)	NH 716 / NH 71
206	Tumkur – Shimoga – Honnavar	Karnataka (363)	363 km (226 mi)	
207	Hosur – Bagalur – Sarjapur – Hoskote – Devanhalli – Doddaballapura -Dobbaspet	Karnataka (135), Tamil Nadu (20)	155 km (96 mi)	NH 648
208	Kollam – kundara – kottarakkara – Punalur – Thenmala -Aryankavu – Sengottai – Tenkasi – Rajapalayam – Thirumangalam(Madurai)	Kerala (81), Tamil Nadu (125)	206 km (128 mi)	NH 744
209	Dindigul – Palani – Pollachi – Coimbatore – Punjai Puliampatti – Sathyamangalam – Chamrajnagar – Kollegal – Malavalli – Kanakapura – Bangalore	Tamil Nadu (286), Karnataka (170)	456 km (283 mi)	NH 948
210	Trichy – Pudukottai – Karaikudi – Devakottai – Ramanathapuram	Tamil Nadu (160)	160 km (99 mi)	NH 336 / NH 536
211	Solapur – Osmanabad – Aurangabad – Dhule	Maharashtra (400)	400 km (250 mi)	
212	Kozhikode – Mysore – Kollegal	Karnataka (160), Kerala (90)	250 km (160 mi)	NH 766
213	Palghat – Kozhikode	Kerala (130)	130 km (81 mi)	NH 966
214	Kathipudi – Kakinada – Pamarru	Andhra Pradesh (270)	270 km (170 mi)	NH 165
214A	Digamarru – Narsapur – Machilipatnam – Challapalle – Avanigadda – Repalle – Bapatla – Chirala – Ongole	Andhra Pradesh (255)	255 km (158 mi)	
215	Panikoili – Keonjhar – Rajamunda	Odisha (348)	348 km (216 mi)	NH 20 / NH 520
216	Raigarh – Sarangarh – Saraipali	Chhattisgarh (80)	80 km (50 mi)	NH 153
217	Raipur – Asika	Chhattisgarh (70), Odisha (438)	508 km (316 mi)	NH 16 / NH 516 / NH 53 / NH 353 / NH 59
218	Bijapur – Hubli	Karnataka (176)	176 km (109 mi)	
219	Madanapalle – Kuppam – Krishnagiri	Andhra Pradesh (128), Tamil Nadu (22)	150 km (93 mi)	
220	Kollam – Kottarakkara – Adoor – Kottayam – Pampady – Ponkunnam – Kanjirappalli – Mundakayam – Peermade – Vandiperiyar – Kumily – Theni	Kerala (210), Tamil Nadu (55)	265 km (165 mi)	
221	Vijayawada – Bhadrachalam – Jagdalpur	Andhra Pradesh (155), Chhattisgarh (174)	329 km (204 mi)	NH 30
222	Kalyan – Murbad – Aalephata – Ahmednagar – Tisgaon – Pathardi -Yeli – Kharwandi – Padalsingi- Majalgaon – Pathri – Manwat – Parbhani – Nanded -Bhokar – Bhisa – Nirmal	Maharashtra (550), Andhra Pradesh (60)	610 km (380 mi)	NH 61
223	Port Blair – Baratang – Mayabunder	Andaman & Nicobar (300)	300 km (190 mi)	NH 4
224	Khordha – Nayagarh – Sonapur – Balangir	Odisha (298)	298 km (185 mi)	NH 57
226	Perambalur – Pudukkottai – Sivagangai – Manamadurai	Tamil Nadu (204)	204 km (127 mi)	
227	Trichy – Chidambaram	Tamil Nadu (136)	136 km (85 mi)	NH 36
228	Sabarmati Ashram – Nadiad – Anand – Surat – Navsari -Dandi	Gujarat (374)	374 km (232 mi)	
229	Tawang – Pasighat	Arunachal Pradesh (1090)	1,090 km (680 mi)	
230	Madurai – Sivagangai – Thondi	Tamil Nadu (82)	82 km (51 mi)	
231	Raibareli – Jaunpur	Uttar Pradesh	169 km (105 mi)	
232	Ambedkarnagar (Tanda) – Banda		305 km (190 mi)	NH 335
232A	Unnao – Lalganj (Junction of NH-232)		68 km (42 mi)	
233	India-Nepal border – Varanasi Azamgarh		292 km (181 mi)	
234	Mangalore – Belthangady – Belur – Huliyar – Sira – Chintamani – Venkatagirikota – Gudiyatham – Katpadi- Vellore – Thiruvannaamalai – Villuppuram	Karnataka (509), Andhra Pradesh (23), Tamil Nadu (234)	780 km (480 mi)	NH 69
235	Meerut – Hapur – Gulaothi – Bulandshahr	Uttar Pradesh (66)	66 km (41 mi)	
275	Bengaluru-Kengeri-Bidadi-Ramanagara-Channapatna-Maddur-Mandya-Srirangapattana-Mysuru-Hunsur-Periyapatna-Bylakuppe-Kushalnagar-Madikeri-Sullia-Puttur-Bantwal-	Karnataka (367)	367 km (228 mi)	
367	Gadankere-Bagalkote-Guledagudda-Badami-Bellur-Jaalihaal-Gajendragadh-Yalburga-Kukanur-Bhanapura	Karnataka (157)	157 km (98 mi)	

== See also ==
- List of national highways in India
- List of national highways in India by state
  - List of national highways in India by state (old numbering)
- List of national highways in India by union territory
- National Highways Authority of India
- National Highways Development Project
