= Kuthannur =

Kuthannur or Kuthannoor may refer to

- Kuthannur-I, a village in Palakkad district, Kerala, India
- Kuthannur-II, a village in Palakkad district, Kerala, India
- Kuthannoor (gram panchayat), a gram panchayat serving the above villages
