= National Highway 107 (India, old numbering) =

Old numbering of road in India

National Highway 107

Route information
- Length: 145 km (90 mi)

Major junctions
- From: Maheshkhunt
- To: Purnia

Location
- Country: India
- States: Bihar : 145 km (90 mi)
- Primary destinations: Sonbarsa Raj – Simri Bakhtiyarpur - Saharsa – Madhepura – Banmankhi

Highway system
- Roads in India; Expressways; National; State; Asian
← NH 106	→ NH 108

National Highway 107 connected Maheshkhunt and Purnia in Bihar, India. The highway was 145 km (90 mi) long and ran only in Bihar. In 2010, the highway was renumbered to form the majority of present-day NH 231.

== Route ==
- Sonbarsa Raj
- Simri Bakhtiyarpur
- Saharsa
- Madhepura
- Banmankhi

== See also ==
- List of national highways in India
- National Highways Development Project
