= National Highway 57 (India, old numbering) =

Old numbering of road in India

National Highway 57

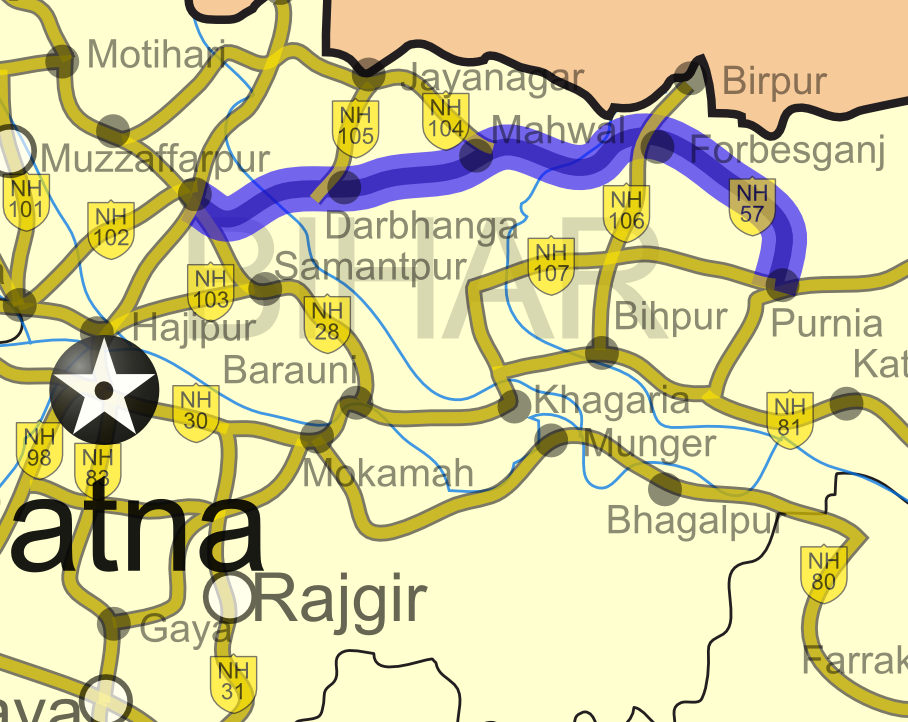

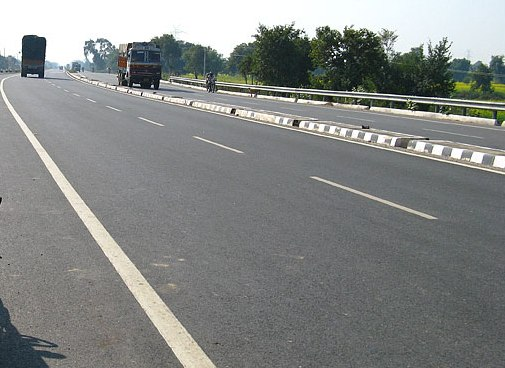
- Old NH 57 in Bihar

Route information
- Length: 310 km (190 mi)

Major junctions
- From: Muzaffarpur
- NH 77, NH 106
- To: Purnea

Location
- Country: India
- States: Bihar
- Primary destinations: Darbhanga - Muria - Sakri - Jhanjharpur - Bhaptiyahi - Simrahi - Narahia - Narpatganj - Forbesganj - Araria

Highway system
- Roads in India; Expressways; National; State; Asian
← NH 56	→ NH 57A

Former National Highway 57 linked Muzaffarpur to Purnea in the Indian state of Bihar. It was 310 km (190 mi) long. In 2010 the national highway numbering system was rationalized and renumbered. The entire stretch of the old national highway 57 is now part of new National Highway 27.

== Route ==
This former national highway passed through Muzaffarpur, Darbhanga, Muria, Supaul, Narahia, Narpatganj, Forbesganj, Araria, Jhanjharpur and Purnia.

== See also ==
- 2010 renumbering of national highways in India
- List of national highways in India
- National Highways Development Project
- Transport in Bihar
- List of national highways in India by state
