= National Highway 77 (India, old numbering) =

Old numbering of road in India

National Highway 77

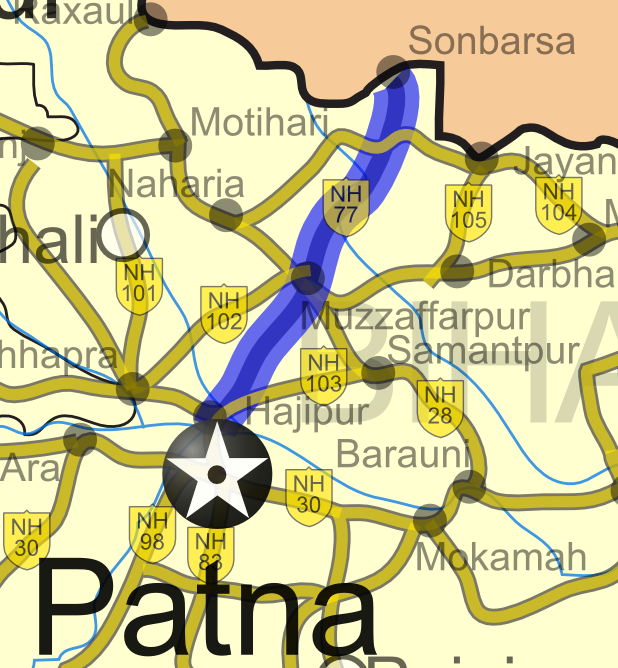
- Road map of India with National Highway 77 highlighted in blue

Route information
- Length: 142 km (88 mi)

Major junctions
- From: Hajipur
- To: Sonbarsa

Location
- Country: India
- States: Bihar
- Primary destinations: Hajipur - Muzaffarpur district - Mehsi - Sheohar - Sitamarhi district

Highway system
- Roads in India; Expressways; National; State; Asian
← NH 76	→ NH 78

National Highway 77 is a National Highway of India entirely within the state of Bihar that links Hajipur to Sonbarsa near India-Nepal border, and is 142 km (88 mi) long. In 2010, the highway was renumbered to form part of present-day NH 22.

== See also ==
- National highways of India
- List of national highways in India
- National Highways Development Project

The national highway has very important from commercial Point view as it connects North Bihar with South Bihar. It also important because it directly connects south Bihar with the International Border of Nepal.
