= National Highway 105 (India, old numbering) =

Old numbering of road in India

National Highway 105

Route information
- Length: 66 km (41 mi)

Major junctions
- From: Darbhanga
- To: Jainagar

Location
- Country: India
- States: Bihar: 66 km (41 mi)
- Primary destinations: Khirma

Highway system
- Roads in India; Expressways; National; State; Asian
← NH 104	→ NH 106

National Highway 105 (NH 105) connected Darbhanga and Jainagar in Bihar. The highway was 66 km (41 mi) long and ran only in Bihar. In 2010, the highway was renumbered to present-day NH 527B.

== Route ==
- Darbhanga
- Khirma
- Ladari
- paradih
- darima
- Keoti
- Ranway
- Aunshi
- Rahika
- Pokharauni
- Kapsiya
- Loha
- Kaluahi
- Dullipatti
- Jainagar

It has been decided to construct the forelane road in the strategically sensitive border area due to neighbouring country Nepal.

== See also ==
- List of national highways in India
- National Highways Development Project
