= NH 106 =

NH 106 may refer to:

- National Highway 106 (India)
- New Hampshire Route 106, United States
