= Mananpur, Jehanabad =

Mananpur विगहा पर
- Village
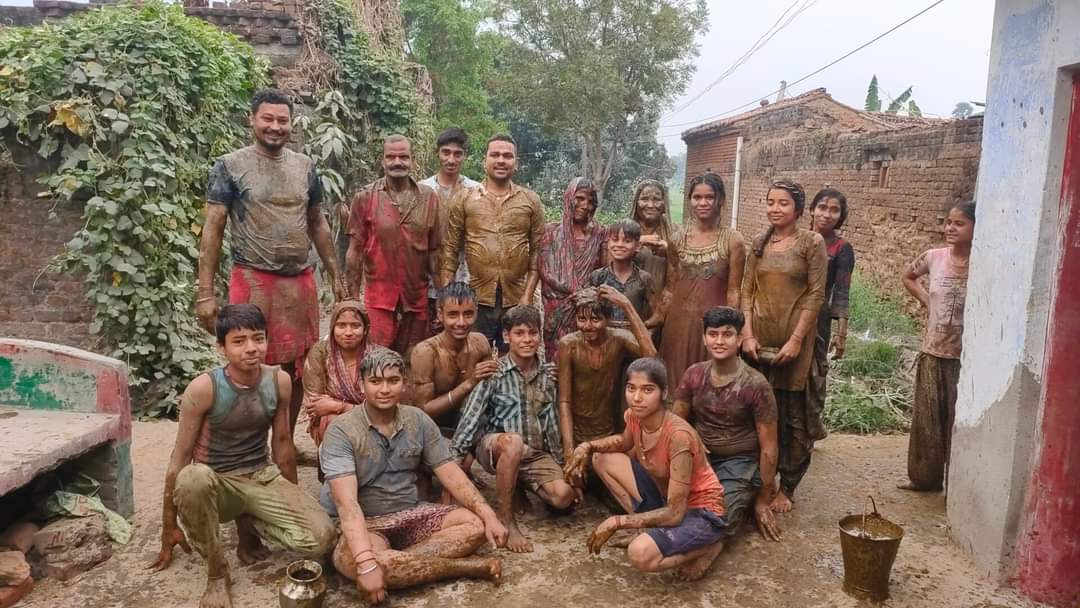
- People are Celebrating holi festival in 2023

- Location in Bihar, India Mananpur (India)
- Coordinates: 25°12′4.11″N 85°9′55.33″E
- Country: India
- State: Bihar
- District: Jehanabad
- Named for: (Hindi:विगहा पर)

Languages
  - Official: Magdhi, Hindi
- Time zone: UTC+5:30 (IST)
- PIN: 804432
- ISO 3166 code: IN-BR
- Coastline: 0 kilometres (0 mi)

Mananpur (Hindi:मननपुर) is a village, which comes under Okari block in Jehanabad District of Bihar State in India. It is located 5 km from Bandhuganj and at 3.5 km from Telhara tadpar. The village, situated about 9.3 km east of Kako, has a population of around 1637.

== History ==
The people of Pariyanva village established a new village as people have maximum land that was far from their residence, so they founded the Village, Mananpur.

== Agriculture ==
The mostly farmers are doing the agriculture of rice and wheat. Crop like maize and Grams also grown in this Village.

After about 2014–2015, the people of the village stopped cultivating sugarcane, but earlier farmers used to cultivate it from almost all the houses here. Still only 8-10% are found doing the cultivation of sugarcane.

== Educations ==
Mananpur village has higher literacy rate compared to Bihar. In 2011, literacy rate of Mananpur village was 87% compared to 61.80% of Bihar. In Mananpur Male literacy stands at 95% while female literacy rate was 79%

== Natives ==
Average people of the village are working as farmer, however, few educated villagers are employed in Jehanabad and Patna or other states. The people of Mananpur mostly speak Hindi & Magdhi. The natives here mostly used these two languages to communicate.

== Schools ==
School type	Name	Board	Classes
Middle, Government	Rajkiye Madhya Vidyalaya	BSEB	1st to 8th
Primary, Private	Holy Child Public School, Mananpur	CBSE	N.C to 5th
