= NH 111 =

NH 111 may refer to:

- National Highway 111 (India)
- New Hampshire Route 111, United States
