= NH 127 =

NH 127 may refer to:

- National Highway 127 (India)
- New Hampshire Route 127, United States
