= NH 115 =

NH 115 may refer to:

- National Highway 115 (India)
- New Hampshire Route 115, United States
