= National Highway 112 (India, old numbering) =

Old numbering of road in India

National Highway 112

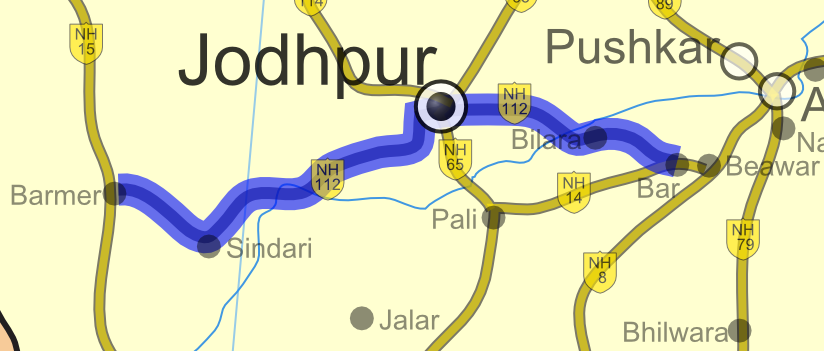

Route information
- Length: 343 km (213 mi)

Major junctions
- From: Bar
- To: Barmer

Location
- Country: India
- States: Rajasthan: 343 km (213 mi)
- Primary destinations: Jaitaran - Bilara - Jodhpur - Pachpadra - Balotra - Kawas

Highway system
- Roads in India; Expressways; National; State; Asian
← NH 111	→ NH 113

National Highway 112 (NH 112) is a National Highway in India entirely within the state of Rajasthan. NH 112 links Bar on NH 14 with Barmer on NH 15 and is 343 km (213 mi) long.

== Route ==
- Jaitaran
- Bilara
- Kaparda
- Jodhpur
- Pachpadra
- Balotra
- Tilwara
- Baytu
- Kawas

== See also ==
- List of national highways in India
- National Highways Development Project
