= National Highway 28 (India, old numbering) =

Old numbering of road in India

National Highway 28
- Map of Old NH28 in red

Route information
- Length: 570 km (350 mi) EW: 512 km (318 mi) (Lucknow - Muzaffarpur - Barauni )

Major junctions
- West end: Lucknow, Uttar Pradesh
- East end: Barauni, Bihar

Location
- Country: India
- States: Uttar Pradesh: 311 km (193 mi); Bihar: 259 km (161 mi)
- Primary destinations: Lucknow - Ayodhya - Gorakhpur - Barauni

Highway system
- Roads in India; Expressways; National; State; Asian
← NH 27	→ NH 28A

National Highway 28 is a National Highway in India that links Lucknow in Uttar Pradesh to Barauni in Bihar. It crosses into Bihar about 20 km (12 mi) from Kushinagar. It joins National Highway 31 at Barauni north of the river Ganges. The total length of NH 28 is 570 km (350 mi). It traverses 259 km (161 mi) in Bihar and 311 km (193 mi) in Uttar Pradesh.

== Span ==
National Highway 28 links the industrial town of Barauni in Bihar with the capital city of Uttar Pradesh, Lucknow, via Gorakhpur. It spans across the districts of Begusarai, Samastipur, Muzaffarpur, East Champaran and Gopalganj in Bihar and Kushinagar, Deoria, Gorakhpur, Sant Kabir Nagar, Basti, Ayodhya, Barabanki and Lucknow in Uttar Pradesh and touches some major cities and towns on the way.

== Start ==
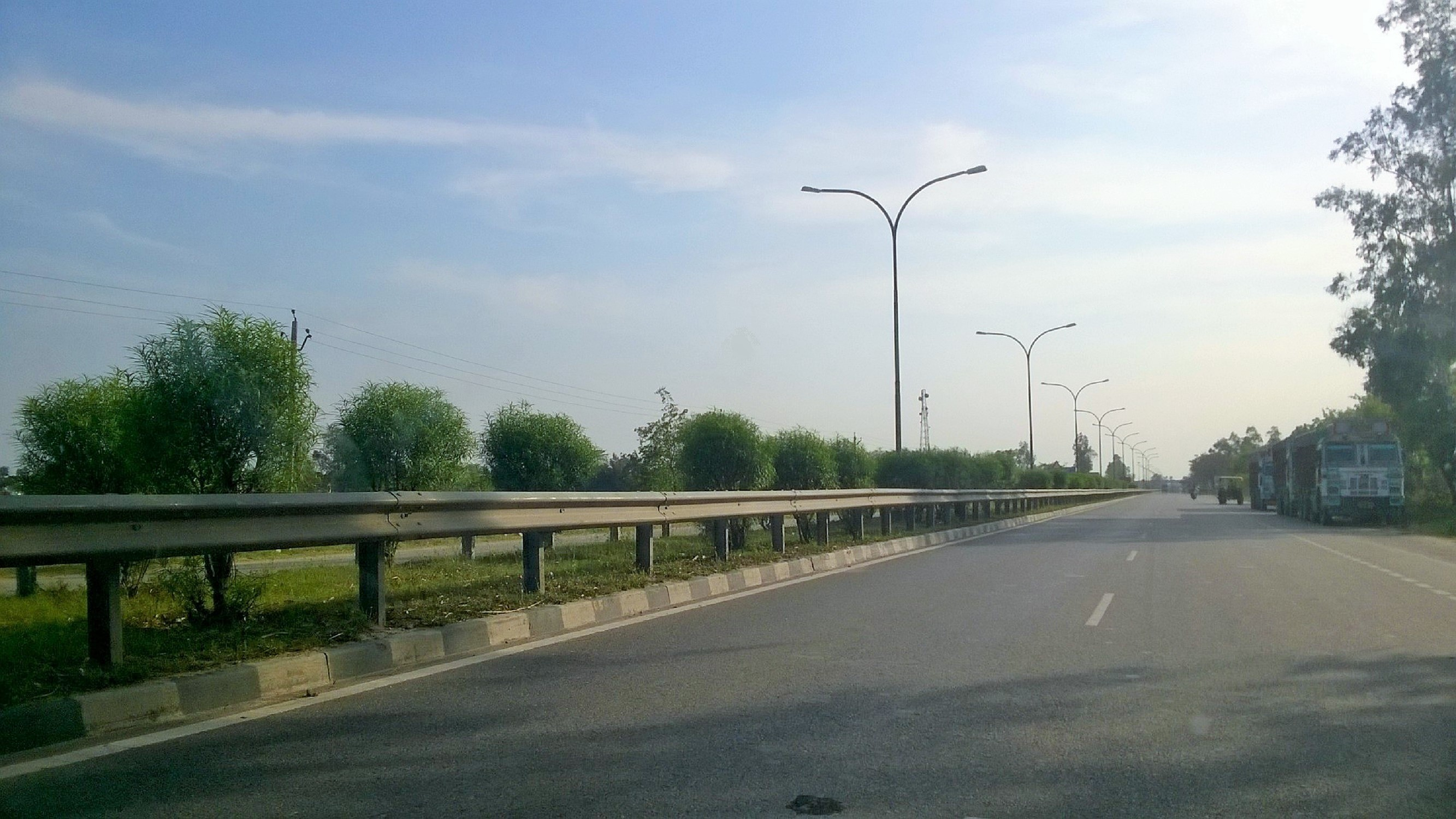
NH 28 near Basti

National Highway 28 starts at the junction with National Highway 31 near Barauni and passes north-west through DalsinghSarai, Samastipur, Muzaffarpur, Mehsi turns westwards at Piprakothi about 10 km (6.2 mi) before Motihari, again becomes north-west bound near Gopalganj and leaves the state past Kuchai Kot to enter Uttar Pradesh. National Highway 28 is 259 km (161 mi) - long in Bihar.

== End ==
In Uttar Pradesh, Kasia is the first major settlement that lies along the National Highway 28. Kushinagar, Uttar Pradesh is 58 km (36 mi) north-west of Gopalganj. The highway then touches Gorakhpur, Basti, Khalilabad, Ayodhya and Barabanki, before terminating at Lucknow. National Highway 28 is 331 km (206 mi) - long in Uttar Pradesh.

== Ditch patch ==
Although well maintained otherwise, NH 28 has bad strip of 40 km (exact) in between Saryu river bridge and UP-Bihar border (near Gopalganj, Bihar). This portion of the highway is full of unsafe and eroded ditches (the depth of which is very difficult to judge from beyond 3 ft). If driving through NH28 in a light-vehicle, it is advisable to cross this patch of highway before dark and avoid it during heavy rains. The situation of this part is generally attributed to lower topography, heavy rains and indifferent attitude of corrupt representatives.

== Accidents ==
It is one of busiest national highway in country and also facing various frequent life losing accidents on it. The main cause behind accidents are unexpected broken road-divider by local population for their ease to cross road. Recently an accident blocking the highway for around 5 hours (which led to around 35 kilometer-long close traffic on NH), took place by students of Sri Ramswaroop Memorial College of Engineering and Management Lucknow because of frequent deaths of students and staff of the college.

== Other important locations ==
Lauria Areraj, the historic town of Ayodhya and Tanda and Rajesultanpur - renowned for its handloomed cotton cloth industry - are some tourist places situated near the National Highway 28, at various points on the way.

== See also ==
- List of national highways in India
- National Highways Development Project
- Lucknow
- Ayodhya
- Gorakhpur
