= Benibad =

Indian village in Muzaffarpur, Bihar

- Village
- Location in Bihar, India Benibad (India)
- Coordinates: 26°08′46.4″N 85°41′27.9″E
- Country: India
- State: Bihar
- District: Muzaffarpur
- Elevation: 14 m (46 ft)

Languages
  - Official: Hindi
- Time zone: UTC+5:30 (IST)
- PIN: 847107
- Telephone code: 06272
- ISO 3166 code: IN-BR
- Nearest city: Samastipur Darbhanga
- Avg. summer temperature: 40 °C (104 °F)
- Avg. winter temperature: 2 °C (36 °F)

Benibad is a village in the Gaighat Block of Muzaffarpur district and is also designated as a notified area in the Indian state of Bihar.

== Geography ==
It is situated approximately 28.37 km away from Muzaffarpur city, on the banks of the River Baghmati, adjacent to National Highway Number 57, part of the East-West Expressway in Bihar. The village is home to more than 20,000 residents. Benibad is renowned for the Baghmati River, which has caused flooding and land erosion. Although Benibad has its own police post (Naka), it falls under the jurisdiction of the Gaighat Police Station, located about 3-4 kilometers away from the village towards Muzaffarpur on NH-57. The village also falls under the Gaighat Assembly Constituency. The main post office serving Benibad is Keotsa Baruari, located approximately 3-4 kilometers away from the village towards Darbhanga on NH-57. Benibad has an Urdu Medium Middle School, a Madrasa (Madrasa Qasmia) for religious education, and a primary school. In addition, it has a Water Ways Office, petrol pumps, and a thriving marketplace.

== Demographics ==
The population of the village is diverse, with Muslims being the predominant community. The educational and economic conditions in the village are satisfactory, and it enjoys excellent transportation connectivity due to the East-West Expressway passing through the village. No train route is available in Benibad, so to access the village one has to go by roadways only.

== Culture ==
For worshippers in the village, there is a large temple and a Jama Masjid located adjacent to each other, symbolizing unity between Hindus and Muslims. Additionally, the village has two smaller mosques. Shopping facilities are readily available in the village's market, drawing people from neighbouring villages who come to purchase essential goods for their daily lives.
