= NH 110 =

NH 110 may refer to:

- National Highway 110 (India)
- New Hampshire Route 110, United States
