= National Highway 69A (India, old numbering) =

Old numbering of road in India

National Highway 69A

Route information
- Length: 158 km (98 mi)

Major junctions
- West end: Multai, Madhya Pradesh
- NH 69 in Multai NH 26-B at Iklahara near Chhindwara; NH 26-B in Chhindwara NH 7 in Seoni
- East end: Seoni, Madhya Pradesh

Location
- Country: India
- States: Madhya Pradesh: 158 km
- Primary destinations: Multai-Seoni

Highway system
- Roads in India; Expressways; National; State; Asian
← NH 69	→ NH 7

National Highway 69A (NH 69A), was a National Highway in India that ran entirely within the state of Madhya Pradesh. The western terminal was in Multai and the eastern terminal was in Seoni. The length of the highway NH 69 A was 158 km.

== New numbering ==
Due to a notification from Ministry of Road Transport and Highways, NH 69A has been renumbered as National Highway 347.

== Major cities en route ==
Multai, Chhindwara, Chaurai Khas and Seoni.

== See also ==
- List of national highways in India
- National Highways Development Project
