= NH 149 =

NH 149 may refer to:

- National Highway 149 (India)
- New Hampshire Route 149, United States
