= National Highway 1 (India, old numbering) =

Old numbering of road in India

National Highway 1
- Map of Old National Highway 1 in red
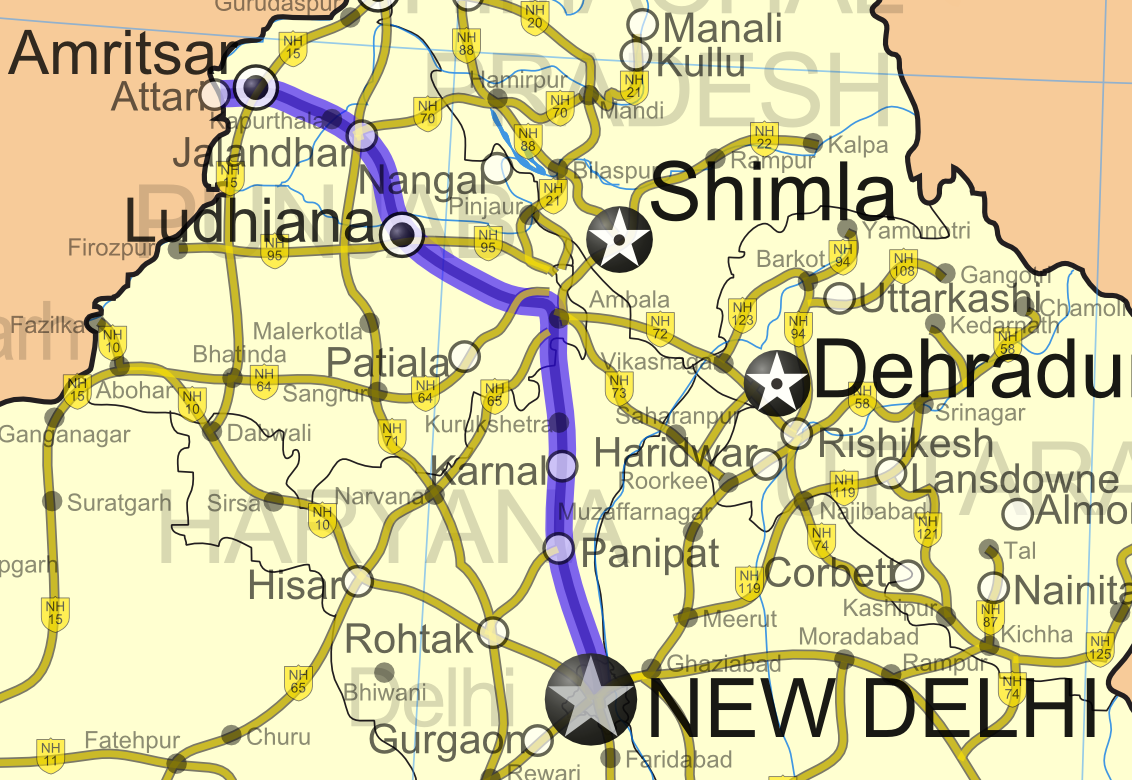
- Road map of India with National Highway 1 highlighted in solid blue colour

Route information
- Part of AH1 AH2
- Length: 456 km (283 mi) NS: 380 km (240 mi) (New Delhi – Jalandhar); Phase III: 49 km (30 mi)

Major junctions
- South end: Delhi
- NH 2 in Delhi NH 8 in Delhi; NH 21 to Manali/Leh in Ambala; NH 22 to Shimla in Ambala; NH 10 in burari NH 71 in Jalandhar NH 15 in Amritsar
- North end: Attari, Punjab

Location
- Country: India
- States: Delhi: 22 km (14 mi); Haryana: 180 km (110 mi); Punjab: 254 km (158 mi)
- Primary destinations: Delhi – Panipat- Kurukshetra – Ambala – Jalandhar – Ludhiana – Phagwara – Amritsar – Indo-Pak Border

Highway system
- Roads in India; Expressways; National; State; Asian
← NH 234	→ NH 1A

National Highway 1 or NH 1 was a National Highway in Northern India that linked the national capital New Delhi to the town of Attari in Punjab near the India–Pakistan border. Old National Highway 1 in its entirety, was part of historic Grand Trunk Road or simply known as GT Road.

== New numbering ==
As of 2010 notification from Ministry of Road Transport and Highways, NH 1 has been renumbered as follows.

- Attari – Amritsar – Jalandhar section is part of new National Highway No. 3
- Jalandhar – Ludhiana – Ambala – Panipat – Delhi section is part of new National Highway No. 44

== National Highways Development Project ==
Approximately 380 km (240 mi) stretch of the old NH 1 from Jalandhar to Delhi is a part of the North-South Corridor.

== See also ==
- List of national highways in India
- National Highways Development Project
