= National Highway 116 (India, old numbering) =

Old numbering of road in India

National Highway 116

Route information
- Length: 80 km (50 mi)

Major junctions
- From: Tonk
- To: Sawai Madhopur

Location
- Country: India
- States: Rajasthan: 80 km (50 mi)

Highway system
- Roads in India; Expressways; National; State; Asian
← NH 114	→ NH 117

National Highway 116 (NH 116) starts from Tonk (junction with NH 12) and ends at Sawai Madhopur, both places in the state of Rajasthan. The highway is 80 km (50 mi) long and runs only in the state of Rajasthan. Route= Tonk, Chandlai, Kakor, Uniara, Kushtala, Sawai Madhopur.

== See also ==
- List of national highways in India
- National Highways Development Project
