= NH 141 =

NH 141 may refer to:

- National Highway 141 (India)
- New Hampshire Route 141, United States
