= National Highway 127A (India) =

National highway in India

National Highway 127A
- Map of National Highway 127A in red

Route information
- Length: 38 km (24 mi)

Major junctions
- From: Pathsala
- To: Bhutan Border

Location
- Country: India
- States: Assam

Highway system
- Roads in India; Expressways; National; State; Asian
← NH 127	→ NH 127A

National Highway 127A (NH 127A) is a National Highway in India.
