= National Highway 111 (India, old numbering) =

Old numbering of road in India

National Highway 111

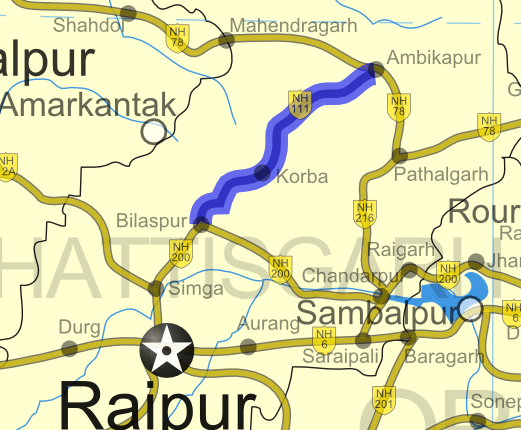

Route information
- Length: 200 km (120 mi)

Major junctions
- From: Bilaspur
- To: Ambikapur

Location
- Country: India
- States: Chhattisgarh: 200 km (120 mi)
- Primary destinations: Ratanpur - Katghore - Kendai

Highway system
- Roads in India; Expressways; National; State; Asian
← NH 110	→ NH 112

National Highway 111 (NH 111) was a National Highway in India entirely within the state of Chhattisgarh. NH 111 linked Bilaspur with Ambikapur and was 200 km (120 mi) long. In 2010, the highway was renumbered to form part of present-day NH 130.

== Route ==
- Ratanpur
- Pali
- Katghora
- Kendai

== See also ==
- List of national highways in India
- National Highways Development Project
