= National Highway 117 (India) =

National highway in India

National Highway 117
- Map of National Highway 117 in red

Route information
- Auxiliary route of NH 17
- Length: 15 km (9.3 mi)

Major junctions
- South end: Tunulgia, North Salmara
- North end: Rakhaldubi near Bongaigaon, Bijni

Location
- Country: India
- States: Assam

Highway system
- Roads in India; Expressways; National; State; Asian
← NH 17	→ NH 27

National Highway 117 (NH 117) is a national highway in India. This route was earlier part of old national highway 31. It is a secondary route of National Highway 17. NH-117 runs through the state of Assam in India.

== Route ==
NH117 connects North Salmara and Bijni in the state of Assam in India.

== Junctions ==
NH 17 Terminal near Tulungia, North Salmara
NH 27 Terminal near Rakhaldubi near Bongaigaon.

== See also ==
- National Highway 12 (formerly numbered 117 and part of which due for return to state)
- List of national highways in India
- List of national highways in India by state
- National Highways Development Project
