= National Highway 70 (India, old numbering) =

National Highway in India

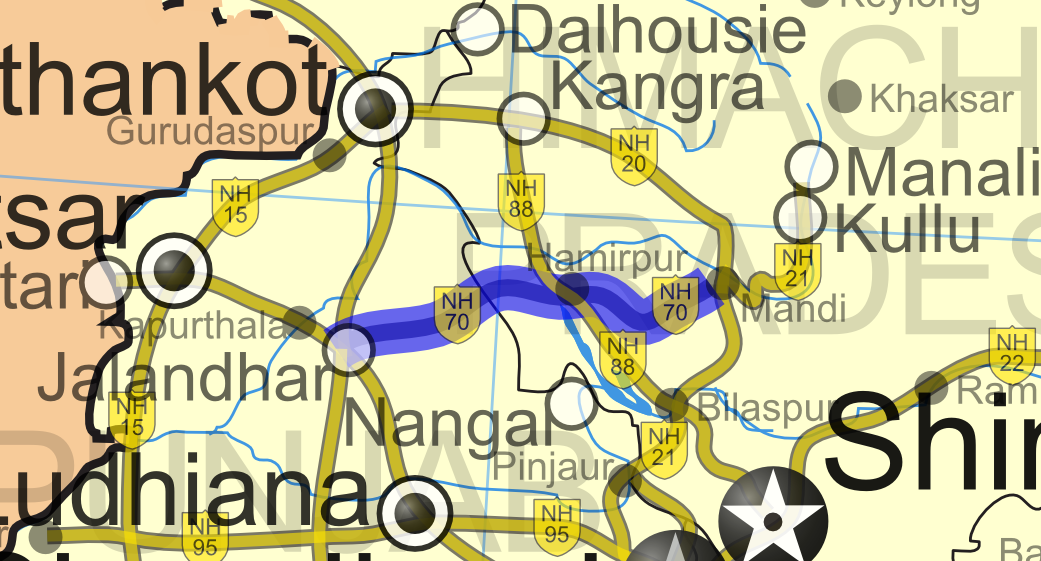
Map of National Highway 70

National Highway 70 (NH 70) was a National Highway in Northern India linking Jalandhar in Punjab to Mandi in Himachal Pradesh. After renumbering of all national highways by National Highway Authority of India in 2010, the old NH 70 has now been subsumed in new National Highway 3 (India) or NH 3.

The highway was 170 km (110 mi) long, of which 50 km (31 mi) was in Punjab and 120 km (75 mi) was in Himachal Pradesh.

== Route ==
- Hoshiarpur
- Hamirpur
- Dharmapur
- Kotli

== See also ==
- List of national highways in India
- National Highways Development Project
