= National Highway 56B (India, old numbering) =

Old numbering of road in India

National Highway 56B
- Map of Old NH 56B in red

Route information
- Length: 19 km (12 mi)

Major junctions
- East end: Gosaiganj at NH 56 km 16
- West end: NH 25 km 19

Location
- Country: India
- States: Uttar Pradesh
- Primary destinations: Mohanlalganj

Highway system
- Roads in India; Expressways; National; State; Asian
← NH 56A	→ NH 57

National Highway 56B or NH 56B, was a former national highway started at NH 56 km 16 and ended at NH 25 km 19 in Uttar Pradesh, India. The total length of the highway is 19 km and runs only in the state of Uttar Pradesh. In 2010, it was renumbered to form part of present-day NH 230.

== See also ==
- List of national highways in India
- National Highways Development Project
