= Kuthannoor Gram Panchayat =

Gram Panchayat in Kerala, India

Coordinates: 10.7333°N 76.5361°E

Kuthannoor (or Kuthanur, Kuthannur, Kuthanoor) is a gram panchayat in the Palakkad district, state of Kerala, India. It is a local government organisation that serves the villages of Kuthannur-I and Kuthannur-II. It is a part of the Tharoor assembly constituency.

One of the six "sangams" or associations of Tholpavakoothu, a form of puppetry, originated in Kuthanur. Krishnan Kutty Pulavar Memorial Tolpavakoothu & Puppet Centre perform puppetry performances at Nadumannath Bhagawathi and Kuthannur Kavu temples in Kuthanur.

Megalithic relics have been discovered in ten acres of reserved forest at Muppuzha, Kuthanoor. These comprise 100 port-hole cists that show strong similarities with dolmens from different parts of Europe, such as the Iberian Peninsula, France, Caucasus mountains, Great Britain, Ireland, the Netherlands, Denmark, Sweden and Israel. The Encyclopaedia of Indian Archaeology describes a port-hole cist thus: "a box-like burial chamber, largely underground and built of gneissic orthostats floorstone and capstone but arranged inside a rectangular pit scooped out of the native laterite. The e. orthostat has a port-hole which is blocked by a small slab on the outside. The entire structure is surrounded by a stone circle. The cist sometimes has a bench inside ..."
