= National Highway 94 (India) =

Highway in Uttrakhand, India

National Highway 94

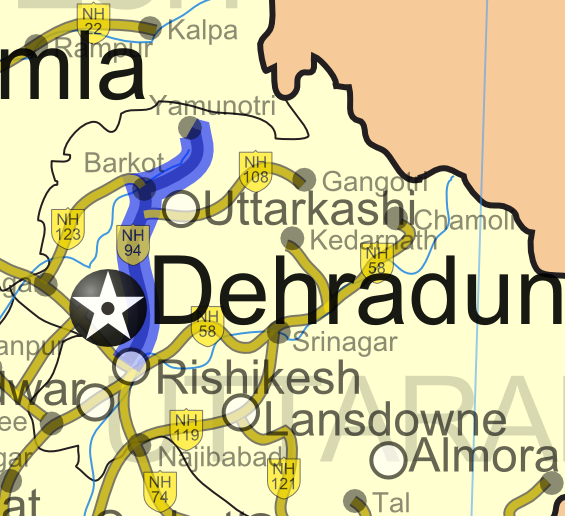

Route information
- Length: 160 km (99 mi)

Major junctions
- From: Hrishikesh
- To: Yamunotri

Location
- Country: India
- States: Uttarakhand: 160 km (99 mi)
- Primary destinations: Ampata - Tehri - Dharasu

Highway system
- Roads in India; Expressways; National; State; Asian
← NH 93	→ NH 95

National Highway 94 (NH 94) starts from Hrishikesh and ends at Yamunotri, both places in the state of Uttarakhand. The highway is 160 km (99 mi) long and runs only in the state of Uttarakhand.

== Route ==
- Ampata
- Tehri
- Dharasu

== See also ==
- List of National Highways in India (by Highway Number)
- List of National Highways in India
- National Highways Development Project
