= National Highway 56A (India, old numbering) =

Old numbering of road in India

National Highway 56A

Route information
- Length: 13 km (8.1 mi)

Major junctions
- From: Chenhat (junction with NH 28)
- To: NH 56 km 16

Location
- Country: India
- States: Uttar Pradesh

Highway system
- Roads in India; Expressways; National; State; Asian
| ← NH 56 | → NH 56B |

National Highway 56A or NH 56A starts at Chenhat (junction with NH 28) and ends at km 16 of NH 56 in Uttar Pradesh, India. The total length of the highway is 13 km and runs only in the state of Uttar Pradesh.

== See also ==
- List of national highways in India
- National Highways Development Project
