= National Highway 26B (India, old numbering) =

Old numbering of road in India

National Highway 26B
- Map of Old NH26B in red

Route information
- Length: 221 km (137 mi)

Major junctions
- South end: Savner, Maharashtra
- NH 69 in Savner NH 69 A at Iklahara near Chhindwara; NH 69 A in Chhindwara NH 26 in Narsingpur
- North end: Narsinghpur, Madhya Pradesh

Location
- Country: India
- States: Maharashtra, Madhya Pradesh
- Primary destinations: Savner, Sausar, Chhindwara, Amarwara, Narsinghpur

Highway system
- Roads in India; Expressways; National; State; Asian
← NH 69	→ NH 26

National Highway 26B (NH 26B), was a National Highway in India that ran entirely within the states of Maharashtra and Madhya Pradesh. The northern terminus was in Narsinghpur and the southern terminus was in Savner. Under new renumbering rules NH 26B was renumbered to NH 547. The length of the NH 26B was 221 kilometres (137 mi).

== Major cities en route ==
Savner, Sausar, Chhindwara, Amarwara, and Narsinghpur

== See also ==
- List of national highways in India
- National Highways Development Project
