= Bandhuganj =

Bandhuganj Dayalpur
- Village
- Location in Bihar, India Bandhuganj (India)
- Coordinates: 25°9′0″N 85°4′0″E
- Country: India
- State: Bihar
- District: Jehanabad

Languages
  - Official: Magdhi, Hindi
- Time zone: UTC+5:30 (IST)
- PIN: 804432
- ISO 3166 code: IN-BR
- Coastline: 0 kilometres (0 mi)

Bandhuganj is a village in Modanganj block, Jehanabad district of Bihar state, India.

== Geography ==
It is in the Jehanabad district of Bihar, and surrounded by the Falgu river and Chunukpur village to the east, Kako block to the west, Modanganj to the north, and Korma village to the south.

== Location ==
National Highway 110 passes through Bandhuganj. The nearest airport is Patna Airport. The nearest railway stations are Eknagar Sarai (11 km) and Jehanabad (14 km). The nearest market is Bandhuganj itself.

== Other ==
It is also known for its watermelon, muskmelon, and desi bhanta.
