= Bariahi =

- Village
- Nickname: Kittu
- Location in Bihar, India Bariahi (India)
- Coordinates: 25°51′0″N 86°33′0″E
- Country: India
- State: Bihar
- District: Saharsa

Languages
  - Official: Maithili, Hindi, Language
- Time zone: UTC+5:30 (IST)
- PIN: 852212
- ISO 3166 code: IN-BR
- Coastline: 0 kilometres (0 mi)

Bariahi is a village in Saharsa district of Bihar state, India. In 2011, Bariahi had a population of 4,177 in 807 families.

== Geography ==
It is located at .

== Location ==
National Highway 107 passes through Bariahi. Nearest airport is Saharsa Airport.
