= Madhavaram, Kurnool =

Madhavaram
- village
- Location in Andhra Pradesh, India
- Coordinates: 15.935858918356892°N 77.35516866861961°E
- Country: India
- State: Andhra Pradesh
- District: Kurnool

Government
  - Body: Village Panchayat

Population
  - Total: 6,059

Languages
  - Official: Telugu
- Time zone: UTC+5:30 (IST)
- ISO 3166 code: IN-AP
- Vehicle registration: AP
- Nearest city: Mantralayam
- Website: ap.gov.in

Madhavaram, is a village in Mantralayam Taluk, Kurnool district in the state of Andhra Pradesh in India.

== Demographics ==
Total Number of Household : 1216
Population	Persons	Males	Females
Total	6,059	3,010	3,049
In the age group 0–6 years	963	474	489
Scheduled Castes (SC)	887	425	462
Scheduled Tribes (ST)	703	341	362
Literates	1,932	1,246	686
Illiterate	4,127	1,764	2,363
Total Worker	3,502	1,798	1,704
Main Worker	3,061	1,616	1,445
Main Worker - Cultivator	233	147	86
Main Worker - Agricultural Labourers	2,456	1,204	1,252
Main Worker - Household Industries	64	40	24
Main Worker - Other	308	225	83
Marginal Worker	441	182	259
Marginal Worker - Cultivator	25	9	16
Marginal Worker - Agriculture Labourers	339	137	202
Marginal Worker - Household Industries	6	2	4
Marginal Workers - Other	71	34	37
Marginal Worker (3-6 Months)	413	164	249
Marginal Worker - Cultivator (3-6 Months)	21	6	15
Marginal Worker - Agriculture Labourers (3-6 Months)	320	126	194
Marginal Worker - Household Industries (3-6 Months)	6	2	4
Marginal Worker - Other (3-6 Months)	66	30	36
Marginal Worker (0-3 Months)	28	18	10
Marginal Worker - Cultivator (0-3 Months)	4	3	1
Marginal Worker - Agriculture Labourers (0-3 Months)	19	11	8
Marginal Worker - Household Industries (0-3 Months)	0	0	0
Marginal Worker - Other Workers (0-3 Months)	5	4	1
Non Worker	2,557	1,212	1,345
