= Ramaipur =

- Village
- Interactive map of Ramaipur
- Country: India
- State: Uttar Pradesh
- District: Bhadohi district

Ramaipur is a village in Bhadohi district, Uttar Pradesh, state India. The village is located on the link road which connects Chauri Bazar at Varanasi-Bhadohi road to Maharazganj Bazar on Varanasi-Allahabad road. The nearest railway station is Parasipur railway station on the line connecting Lucknow to Varanasi via Bhadohi. The Parasipur railway station is 7 kilometres (4.3 miles) from the village. The village market is spread adjacent to the pitch road. The bazaar has at least 10 grocery shops, three primary schools, four barber shops at least half a dozen sweet shops and dozen chai and pan shops. The weekly sabzi bazar is conducted on Thursday. The market provides daily use items to nearby villages too. there are more than twenty self-appointed medical practitioners, none qualified academically. However, these jhola chap doctors offer primary health services to many people around Ramaipur.the most famous person in this village is Pt Samar Nath Mishra. He is about 85 years now.

== Worker ==
The major economic activity of the village is agriculture, mainly subsistence based, and carpet weaving. The landless people weave the famous bhadohi woolen carpets but not the people from higher caste of Brahmins. Many people have migrated to Kolkata and Mumbai and post order money is a very prominent source of income. There is one rabi crop of wheat and another kharif crop of rice mainly with help of irrigation by ground water pumped through a government-installed bore well and a couple of private ones. There is hardly any commercial cropping. Much of land is alkaline, posing a great difficulty to agricultural activity.
