= Paramadevanahalli =

Village in Karnataka, India

Coordinates: 15°09′N 77°03′E

Paramadevanahalli is a village in the southern state of Karnataka, India.

== See also ==
- Bellary
- Districts of Karnataka
