= National Highway 67 (India, old numbering) =

National highway in India

National Highway 67

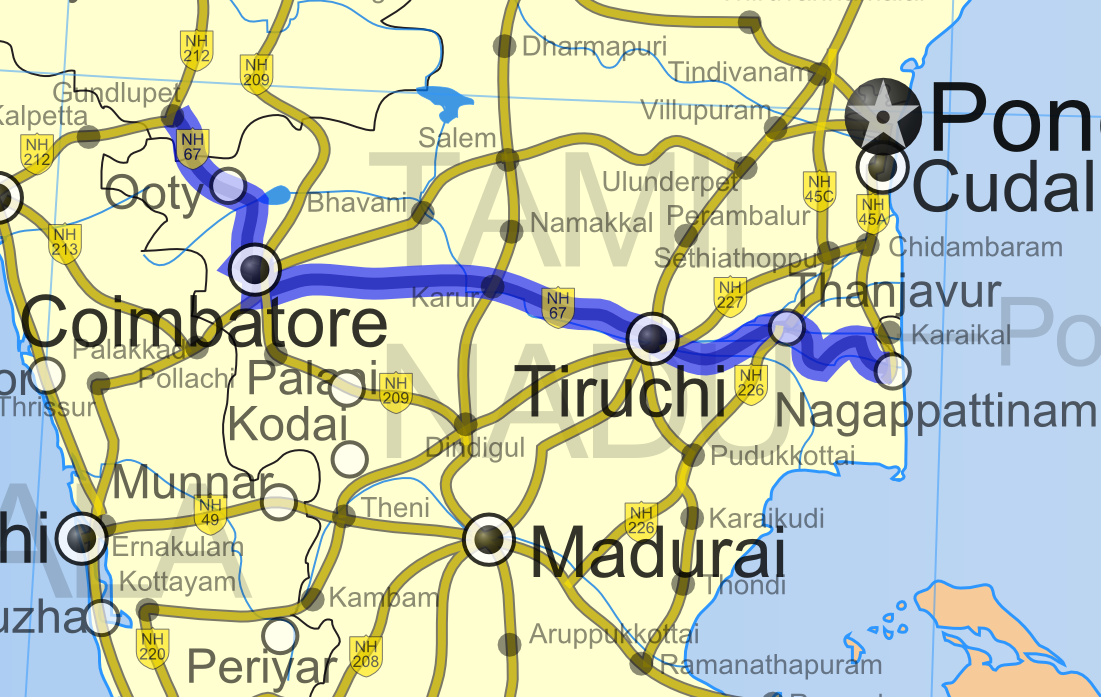

Route information
- Length: 520 km (320 mi)

Major junctions
- From: Nagapattinam, Tamil Nadu
- To: Gundlupet, Karnataka

Location
- Country: India
- States: Tamil Nadu: 505 km Karnataka: 50 km
- Primary destinations: Nagapattinam - Thanjavur - Tiruchirappalli - Karur - Coimbatore - Udagamandalam - Gudalur - Gundlupet

Highway system
- Roads in India; Expressways; National; State; Asian
← NH 66	→ NH 68

National Highway 67 is a National Highway in Southern Indian states of Tamil Nadu and Karnataka. It runs from Nagapattinam, a sea-side town in Tamil Nadu to Gundlupet in Karnataka near the intersection of National Highway 212. The most important cities connected by this highway are Coimbatore and Tiruchirappalli and other important towns connected by this highway are Nagapattinam, Thiruvarur, Thanjavur, Karur, Kangayam, Mettupalayam, Ooty. This highway traverses the wider middle region of Tamil Nadu. The total length of NH 67 runs to 555 km (345 mi). The National Highway 67 along with National Highway 212 connects city of Mysuru via Gundlupet with Ooty. The NH 67 passes through Sathyamangalam Wildlife Sanctuary and Bandipur National Park in Karnataka state. There has been reports of wild animals being killed by speeding vehicles in this highway.

== Route ==
Nagappattinam, Thiruvarur, Thanjavur, Tiruchirappalli, Kulithalai, Karur, Vellakoil, Kangayam, Palladam, Coimbatore, Sathyamangalam, Mettupalayam, Coonoor, Ooty, Naduvattam and Gundlupet.

And there is a proposal for extension of this highway as NH 67-A, which splits from Karur towards Erode, and reaches Mysore through Sathy & Chamarajanagar and to Bangalore through Anthiyur & Kanakapura.

== Road upgrading ==
NH 67 runs along the southern banks of Kaveri river between Tiruchirappalli and Karur. The road between Karur and Coimbatore for a distance of 114.4 km (71.1 mi) is being widened into two/four lanes expressway and the project will be complete by August 2009. The 67 km (42 mi) distance between Thanjavur and Tiruchirappalli is widened by Madhucon Projects Ltd. The 79.7 km (49.5 mi) distance between Tiruchirappalli and Karur is widened by Reliance Infrastructure. The Coonoor-Mettupalayam section was shut in 2010 due to landslides caused by heavy rains in the region. Subsequently, the National Highways Authority of India had the road re-laid which got eroded, again due to rains. In 2012, the Highways Department decided to initiate criminal proceedings against the NHAI, under Section 133 of Criminal Penal Code, dealing with acts endangering human life, due to non maintenance of the road.

The Coimbatore-Karur section is 10 metres wide, with one-metre hard way on either side, while 30 km of the road, covering important towns, is four-lane, and the remaining two-lane till Karur. The Karur-Tiruchirappalli section is being upgraded by Reliance Infrastructure on BOT basis. The Karur - Tiruchirappalli section upgradation from two to four lane has been completed and toll collection has been started by Reliance Infrastructure. The Tiruchirappalli-Thanjavur section is being upgraded by Madhucon on a BOT basis. In 2010, the State Government sent a proposal to the centre for upgrading the Thanjavur-Nagapattinam section of the highway.

== Gallery ==
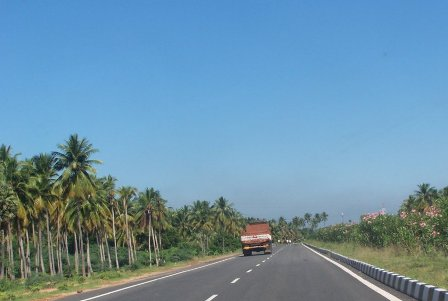
NH 67

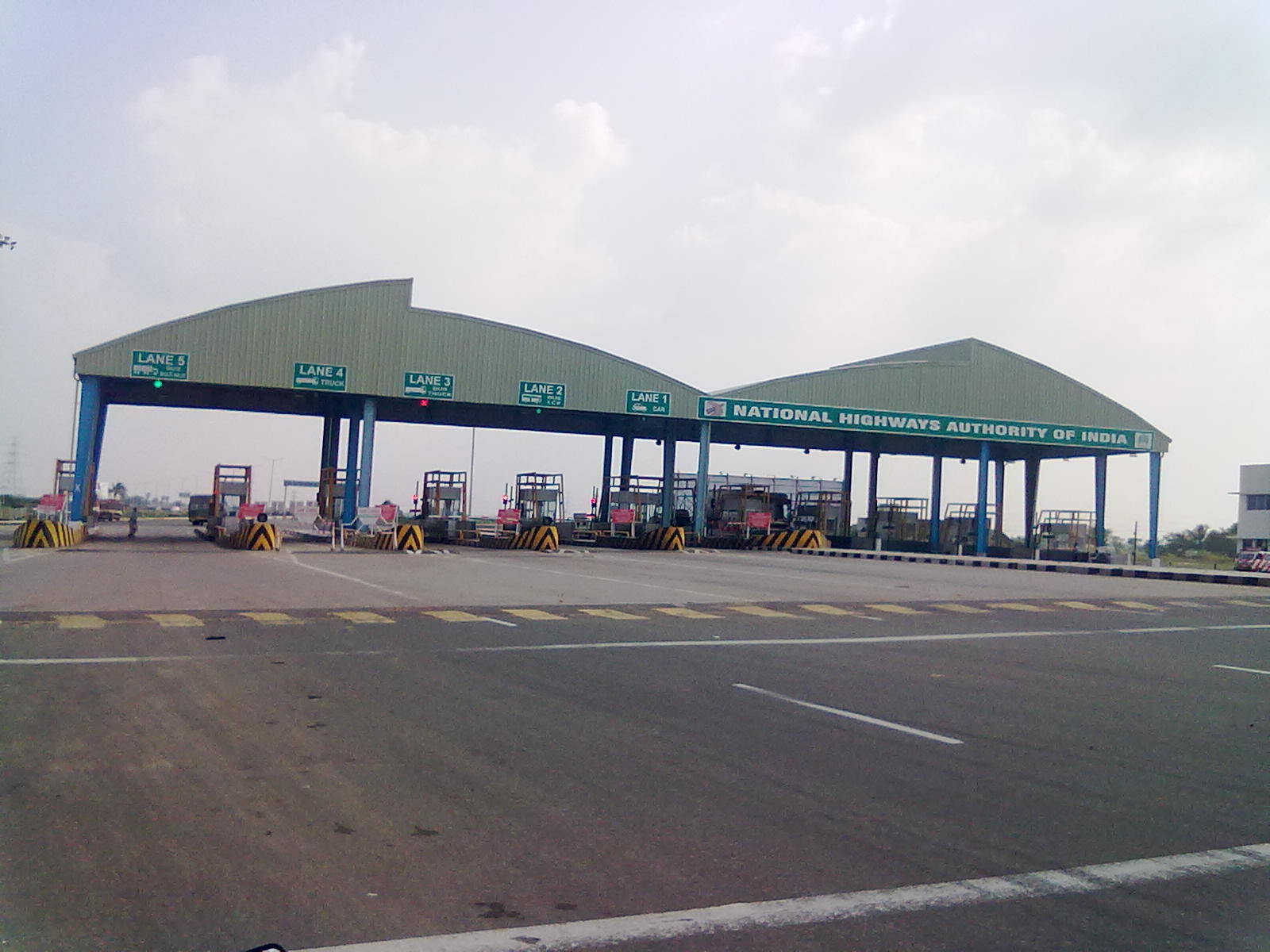
Toll Gate in Tiruchirappalli on NH 67

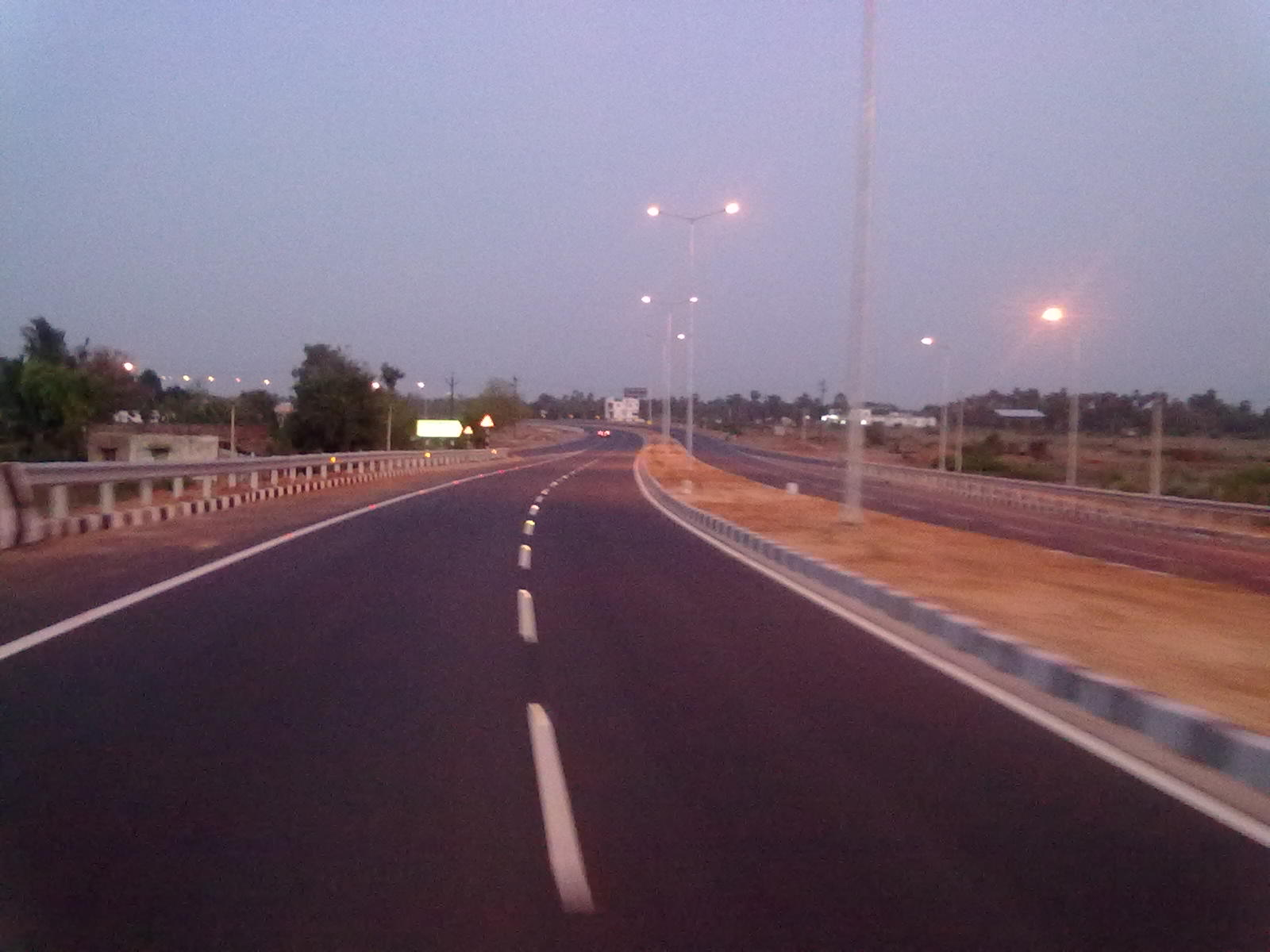
NH 67 in Thanjavur, Tamil Nadu

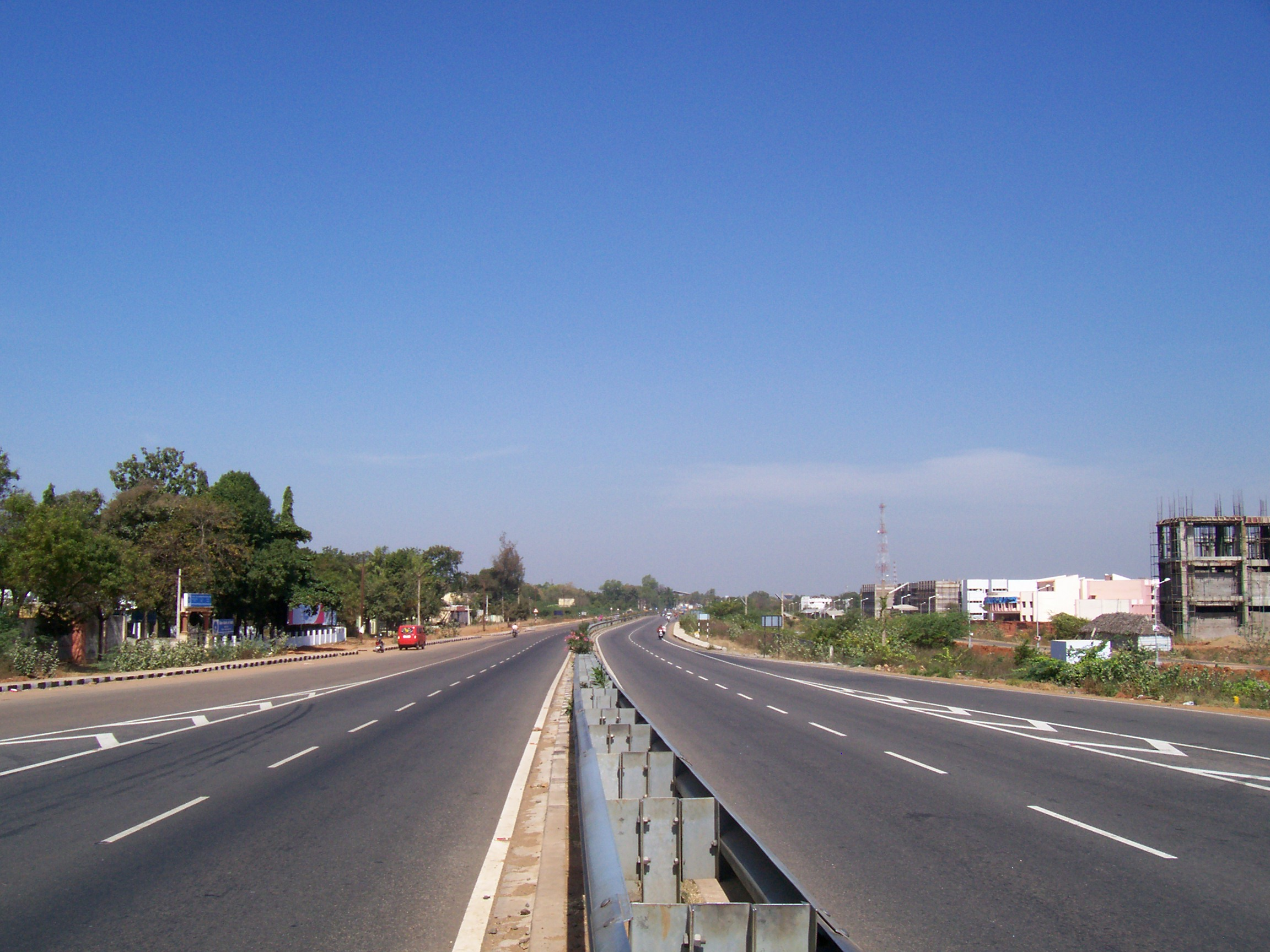
NH 67 Tiruchirappalli-Thanjavur section.
