= Sachendi =

- suburb
- Location in Uttar Pradesh, India
- Coordinates: 26.371165°N 80.112300°E
- Country: India
- State: Uttar Pradesh
- District: Kanpur Nagar
- Founded by: Raja Hindu Singh

Government
  - Type: Village Panchayat
  - Body: Sachendi Gram Panchayat

Population (2011)
  - Total: 19,424

Languages
  - Official: Hindi
- Time zone: UTC+5:30 (IST)
- PIN 209304: 209304
- Vehicle registration: UP-78
- Kanpur: Kanpur
- Literacy: 76.20%
- Lok Sabha constituency: Akbarpur
- Website: kanpurnagar.nic.in

Sachendi is a suburb in Kanpur, India, situated about 10 km from Kanpur on the NH 19 to Delhi. The population was 19,424 as of the 2011 census. It has a 76,20% literacy rate and is 7 km from Panki, a Kanpur suburb. It is considered part of the Kanpur Metropolitan Area.

== Transportation ==
Sachendi has a bus station and UPSRTC Busses of Kanpur have routes from Sachendi to different localities.

Nearest railway stations from Sachendi are Bhaupur railway station on the Kanpur-Delhi line and Bhimsen Jn. on the Kanpur-Jhansi line.

Kanpur Civil Airport is nearest airport.

== Tourist attractions ==
The tourist hub of Kanpur is 10 km from the town. Dharmangadpur is a large nearby village.
