= Zalaki =

- village
- Location in Karnataka, India Zalaki (India)
- Coordinates: 17°15′25″N 75°48′10″E
- Country: India
- State: Karnataka
- District: Vijayapur, Karnataka
- Boroughs: Vijayapur, Karnataka

Government
  - Body: Gram panchayat

Population (2011)
  - Total: 2,707

Languages
  - Official: Kannada
- Time zone: UTC+5:30 (IST)
- ISO 3166 code: IN-KA
- Vehicle registration: KA
- Website: karnataka.gov.in

Zalaki is a village in the southern state of Karnataka, India. It is located in the Chadachan Taluk of Vijayapur district, Karnataka.

== Demographics ==
In the 2011 census, Zalaki reported a population of 2,686 inhabitants.

As of the 2011 India census, Zalaki is a large village located in Indi Taluk of Vijayapur district, Karnataka with total 489 families residing. The Zalaki village has population of 2686 of which 1370 are males while 1316 are females as per Population Census 2011.

In Zalaki village population of children with age 0-6 is 402 which makes up 14.97 % of total population of village. Average Sex Ratio of Zalaki village is 961 which is lower than Karnataka state average of 973. Child Sex Ratio for the Zalaki as per census is 861, lower than Karnataka average of 948.

Zalaki village has lower literacy rate compared to Karnataka. In 2011, literacy rate of Zalaki village was 70.32 % compared to 75.36 % of Karnataka. In Zalaki Male literacy stands at 81.54 % while female literacy rate was 58.85 %.

As per constitution of India and Panchyati Raaj Act, Zalaki village is administrated by Sarpanch (Head of Village) who is elected representative of village.

== Agriculture ==
The village mainly grows sugarcane, grapes, pomegranates, maize, and sorghum (jawar), as well as small area of lemon, onion, and turmeric etc. Irrigation via water canals, bore-wells and open wells.

== Literacy Rate ==
The village literacy rate is about 66.37%. Males has 76.37% and Female has 55.63% of literacy.

== Politics ==
Zalaki comes under Indi Assembly Constituency and Vijayapur Parliamentary Constituency.

== Transportation ==
Village is well connected to district headquarter Vijayapur via Horti also Indi and Chadchan. National Highway 52 passes near the village

== Climate and Temperature ==
Climate data for Hanamasagar
Month	Jan	Feb	Mar	Apr	May	Jun	Jul	Aug	Sep	Oct	Nov	Dec	Year
Mean daily maximum °C (°F)	29.2 (84.6)	32.8 (91.0)	35.9 (96.6)	37.9 (100.2)	37.5 (99.5)	34.0 (93.2)	31.1 (88.0)	31.0 (87.8)	31.1 (88.0)	31.0 (87.8)	29.5 (85.1)	29.0 (84.2)	32.5 (90.5)
Mean daily minimum °C (°F)	15.5 (59.9)	17.6 (63.7)	22.6 (72.7)	24.0 (75.2)	25.0 (77.0)	23.0 (73.4)	22.2 (72.0)	22.0 (71.6)	22.7 (72.9)	20.2 (68.4)	16.7 (62.1)	13.0 (55.4)	20.4 (68.7)
Average rainfall mm (inches)	8.6 (0.34)	3.1 (0.12)	6.0 (0.24)	10.0 (0.39)	16.2 (0.64)	61.1 (2.41)	77.1 (3.04)	74.5 (2.93)	62.0 (2.44)	51.6 (2.03)	27.2 (1.07)	3.5 (0.14)	400.9 (15.79)

Village has a semi-arid climate. It has an average elevation of 606 metres (1988 ft).

The climate is generally dry and healthy. In summer, especially in April and May it is too hot; at that time the temperature lays between 40 degree Celsius to 42 degree Celsius. In winter season, from November to January the temperature is between 20 degree Celsius to 30 degree Celsius. Usually the district has dry weather, so the humidity varies from 10% to 30%.

== See also ==
- Bijapur district, Karnataka
- Districts of Karnataka
