= North–South and East–West Corridor =

Road in India

- Highway map of India with the corridor highlighted

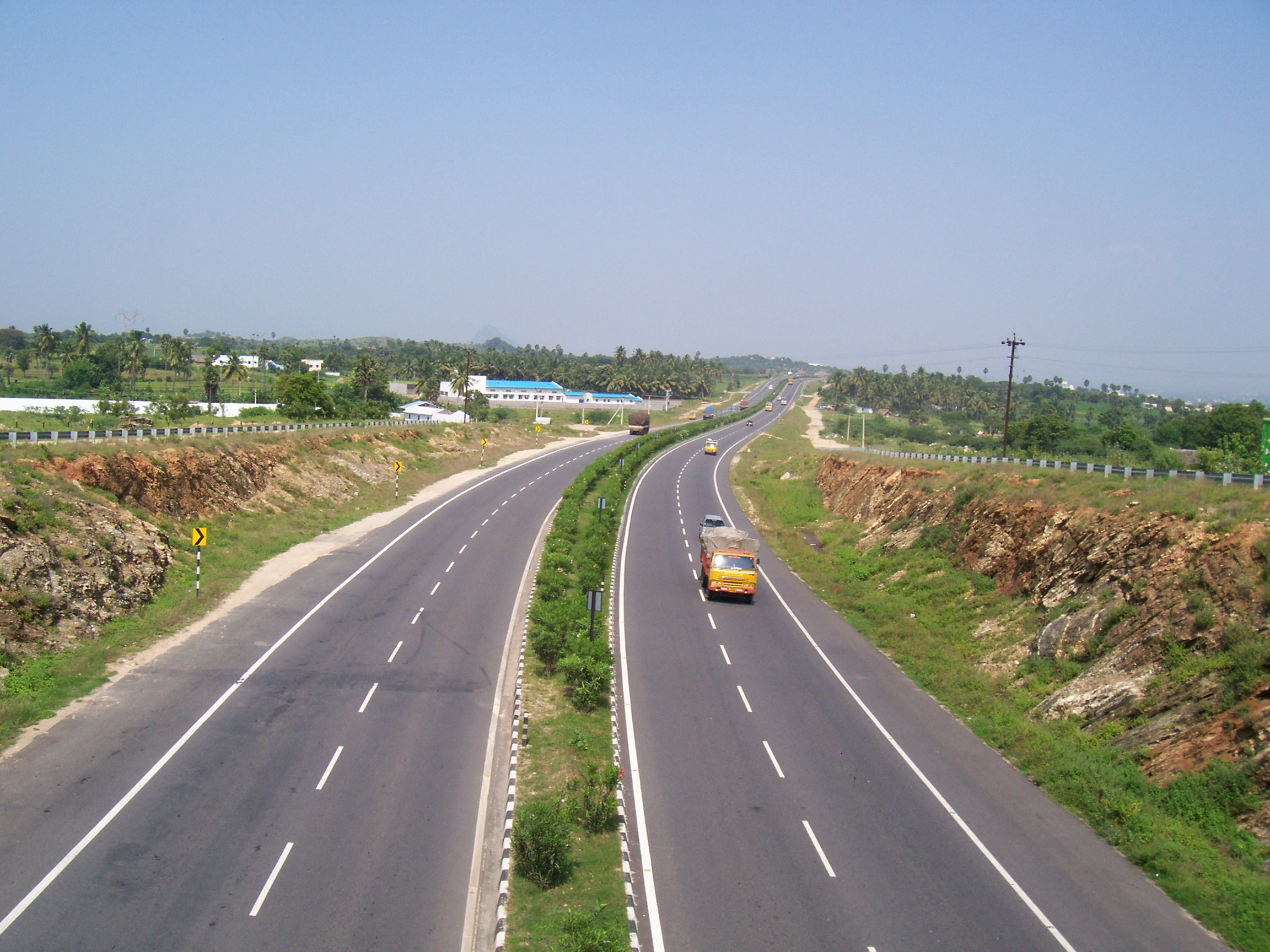
- A section of the North-South corridor

Route information
- Maintained by NHAI
- Length: 7,300 km (4,500 mi)

NH-44 and NH-544
- Length: 4,000 km (2,500 mi)
- North end: Srinagar
- South end: Kanyakumari; Kochi

NH-27
- Length: 3,300 km (2,100 mi)
- East end: Silchar
- West end: Porbandar

Location
- Country: India

Highway system
- Roads in India; Expressways; National; State; Asian

The North–South and East–West Corridor is a network of national highways connecting major cities of India. It consists of two highway systems – the North–South highway extending 4,000 km (2,500 mi) from Srinagar in the north to Kanyakumari in the south with a spur to Kochi and the East–West highway extending 3,300 km (2,100 mi) from Silchar in the east to Porbandar in the west.

The project was part of the first phase of the National Highways Development Project executed by the Government of India. The roads were constructed and are maintained by the National Highway Authority of India under the purview of the Ministry of Road Transport and Highways. The road system consists of access controlled four or six-lane highways, built at a cost of US$12.32 (equivalent to $23.81 in 2025) billion. As of 2017, about 6,579 km (4,088 mi) of the project was complete.

== Background and planning ==
In 1998, the Government of India launched the National Highways Development Project (NHDP). The project envisaged the development of about 13,150 km (8,170 mi) of four and six lane highways at an estimated cost of ₹540 billion (equivalent to ₹2.3 trillion or US$27 billion in 2023). The North–South and East–West Corridor project is part of the second phase of NHDP, and involved the construction of 7,300 km (4,500 mi) of multi-lane highways connecting the major cities. It was intended to establish better and faster transport networks thereby reducing costs, and drive economical growth by providing better access to markets.

== Construction ==
National Highways Authority of India (NHAI) was tasked with the implementation of the project. As per the original plan, the project was intended to be completed by 2007. As of 2001, about 675 km (419 mi) were converted to four-laned roads. Only 11% of the work was completed by December 2005 and the revised deadline was set for December 2009. However, the government informed the Parliament of India in 2009 that only 59% of the work was complete. A parlimenatry panel probe revealed that about 6,031 km (3,747 mi) of the highways were complete in 2012 and the panel further criticised NHAI for the delay in the project citing inadequate planning. As of 2017, about 6,579 km (4,088 mi) of the project has been completed.

== Network ==
The North–South and East–West Corridor consists 7,300 km (4,500 mi) of multi-lane highways connecting major cities. It consists of two highway systems – the North–South highway extending 4,000 km (2,500 mi) from Srinagar in the north to Kanyakumari in the south with a spur to Kochi and the East–West highway extending 3,300 km (2,100 mi) from Silchar in the east to Porbandar in the west.

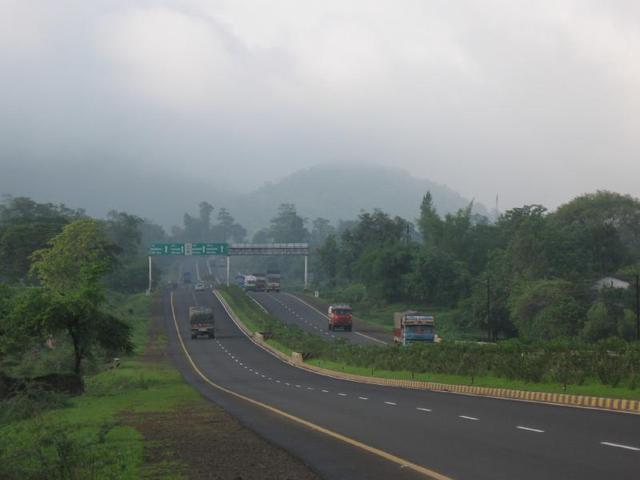
A section of North-South corridor

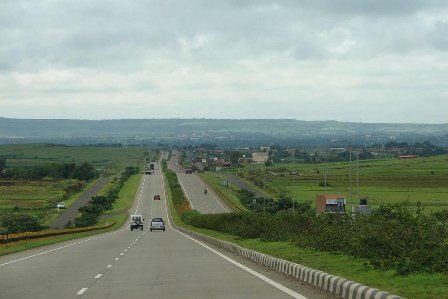
A section of East-West corridor

Segment	Terminii	Length	National Highway	States/UTs
North-South	Srinagar–Kanyakumari/Kochi	4,000 km (2,500 mi)	NH-44 and NH-544	Andhra Pradesh – 261 km (162 mi); Haryana – 180 km (110 mi); Himachal Pradesh – 14 km (8.7 mi); Jammu and Kashmir – 14 km (8.7 mi); Karnataka – 125 km (78 mi); Kerala – 160 km (99 mi); Madhya Pradesh – 524 km (326 mi); Maharashtra – 232 km (144 mi); Punjab – 296 km (184 mi); National Capital Territory – 34 km (21 mi); Rajasthan – 32 km (20 mi); Telangana – 492 km (306 mi); Tamil Nadu – 851 km (529 mi); Uttar Pradesh – 268 km (167 mi)
East-West	Silchar–Porbandar	3,300 km (2,100 mi)	NH-27	Assam – 753 km (468 mi); Bihar – 517 km (321 mi); Gujarat – 654 km (406 mi); Madhya Pradesh – 142 km (88 mi); Rajasthan – 480 km (300 mi); Uttar Pradesh – 548 km (341 mi); West Bengal – 366 km (227 mi)
	7,300 km (4,500 mi)			

=== Major towns ===
Major towns
Segment	State/UT						
North-South	Andhra Pradesh	Haryana	Himachal Pradesh	Jammu and Kashmir	Karnataka	Kerala	Madhya Pradesh
North-South	Anantapur; Gooty; Kurnool; Penukonda	Ambala; Faridabad; Hodal; Karnal; Kundli; Palwal; Panipat		Banihal; Jammu; Kathua; Srinagar	Bengaluru	Palakkad; Thrissur; Ernakulam	Datia; Gwalior; Lakhnadon; Morena; Narsimhapur; Sagar; Seoni
North-South	Maharashtra	National Capital Territory	Punjab	Rajasthan	Tamil Nadu	Telangana	Uttar Pradesh
North-South	Jamb; Nagpur; Pandharkawada	Delhi	Jalandhar; Ludhiana; Mukerian; Pathankot; Rajpura	Dhaulpur	Coimbatore; Dharmapuri; Dindigul; Erode; Hosur; Kanyakumari; Karur; Krishnagiri; Madurai; Salem; Tirunelveli	Adilabad; Nirmal; Ramayampet; Hyderabad	Agra; Jhansi; Lalitpur; Mathura
East-West	Assam	Bihar	Gujarat	Madhya Pradesh	Rajasthan	Uttar Pradesh	West Bengal
East-West	Bongaigaon; Bijni; Dispur; Haflong; Lumding; Nagaon; Nalbari; Patacharkuchi	Araria; Darbhanga; Forbesganj; Gopalganj; Muzaffarpur; Purnia	Bamanbore; Morvi; Palanpur; Radhanpur; Samakhiali	Ganj; Shivpuri	Baran; Chittaurgarh; Kota; Pindwara; Udaipur	Faizabad; Gorakhpur; Jhansi; Kanpur; Lucknow	Dalkola; Dhupguri; Falakata; Islampur; Jalpaiguri; Mainaguri; Siliguri; Sonapur

== See also ==
- Bharatmala
- Sagar Mala project
- UDAN
