= Mubarikpur =

- village
- Location within Madhya Pradesh Location within India
- Coordinates: 23.3139194°N 77.3138769°E
- Country: India
- State: Madhya Pradesh
- District: Bhopal
- Tehsil: Huzur
- Elevation: 502 m (1,647 ft)

Population (2011)
  - Total: 1,526
- Time zone: UTC+5:30 (IST)
- ISO 3166 code: MP-IN
- 2011 census code: 482461

Mubarikpur is a village in the Bhopal district of Madhya Pradesh, India. It is located in the Huzur tehsil and the Phanda block. Hindi is the local language.

== Demographics ==
According to the 2011 census of India, Mubarikpur has 248 households. The effective literacy rate (i.e. the literacy rate of population excluding children aged 6 and below) is 69.43%.

Demographics (2011 Census)
	Total	Male	Female
Population	1526	785	741
Children aged below 6 years	221	119	102
Scheduled caste	193	101	92
Scheduled tribe	13	4	9
Literates	906	525	381
Workers (all)	834	428	406
Main workers (total)	532	298	234
Main workers: Cultivators	114	75	39
Main workers: Agricultural labourers	191	91	100
Main workers: Household industry workers	19	8	11
Main workers: Other	208	124	84
Marginal workers (total)	302	130	172
Marginal workers: Cultivators	22	11	11
Marginal workers: Agricultural labourers	92	42	50
Marginal workers: Household industry workers	6	6	0
Marginal workers: Others	182	71	111
Non-workers	692	357	335
