= Kamargaon =

Village in Maharashtra

Coordinates: 20°37′N 77°30′E

Kamargaon is a village on the Pune to Ahmednagar State Highway in India. There is a windmill farm 20 km outside town. The village deity is Kamaksha Devi. Pincode of Kamargaon is 414005

History of Kamargaon-

Recently a Marathi film Fandry was shot at location of Kamargaon lake. the village is ancient and historic place

Karmargoan also have buildings built in medieval period There is a Gadhi of Sardar Antaji Mankeshwar Gandhe in Karmargoan Chhatrapati shahu Maharaj (First) appointed Sardar Antaji Mankeshwar Gandhe in Delhi to look at Maratha Empire He last breath in Panipat-II war and was martyred The Gadhi of Sardar Gandhe is still present
