= Kochgaon =

- village
- Interactive map of Kochgaon
- Coordinates: 26°46′04″N 93°08′37″E
- Country: India
- State: Assam
- District: Biswanath district

Government
  - Body: Gram panchayat

Languages
  - Official: Assamese
- Time zone: UTC+5:30 (IST)
- ISO 3166 code: IN-AS
- Vehicle registration: AS
- Coastline: 0 kilometres (0 mi)

Kochgaon is a village under Sakomatha block in Biswanath district, Assam, India.

== Location ==
National Highway 31C passes through Kochgaon.
