= Kuthannur-II =

- village
- Country: India
- State: Kerala
- District: Palakkad

Population (2011)
  - Total: 6,620

Languages
  - Official: Malayalam, English
- Time zone: UTC+5:30 (IST)
- PIN: 6XXXXX
- Vehicle registration: KL-

Kuthannur-II is a village in Palakkad district in the state of Kerala, India.

== Demographics ==
As of 2011 India census, Kuthannur-II had a population of 6,620 with 3,227 males and 3,393 females.
