= Narahia =

- Village
- Location in Bihar, India
- Coordinates: 26°22′0″N 86°32′0″E
- Country: India
- State: Bihar
- District: Madhubani

Area
  - Total: 11.55 km^{2} (4.46 sq mi)
- Elevation: 58 m (190 ft)

Population (Census of 2011)
  - Total: 13,740
  - Density: 1,190/km^{2} (3,081/sq mi)

Languages
  - Official: Maithili, Hindi
- Time zone: UTC+5:30 (IST)
- Postal code: 847108
- ISO 3166 code: IN-BR
- Coastline: 0 kilometres (0 mi)
- Nearest city: Madhubani, Darbhanga
- Website: https://madhubani.nic.in/

Narahia is a large village in Madhubani district of the Indian state of Bihar. Narahia is also called for the Mithalanchal land of Bihar.

== Geography ==
Narahia is located in north Bihar, near the border of India and Nepal (about 30 km by road). It is surrounded by Balan and Bihul rivers. Narahia is located in Laukahi Block of Madhubani district.

It is alongside the East-west corridor (Porbander to Silcher NH 27).

== Demographics ==
2762 families residing there. Its population includes 13740 of which 7019 are males while 6721 are females as per Population Census 2011.

In Narahia village population of children aged 0-6 is 2646 which makes up 19.26% of the population. The average sex ratio of Narahia village is 958 which is higher than Bihar state average of 918. The child sex ratio as per census is 938 was higher than Bihar's average of 935.

Narahia village has lower literacy rate compared to Bihar. In 2011, the literacy rate was 53.17% compared to 61.80% for Bihar. Male literacy stands at 64.33% while female literacy rate was 41.58%.

== Administration ==
This village comes under Laukahi police station, and Laukha laukahi Vidhan sabha kshetra, and Phulparas constituency. One Police outpost is also located here.

== Education ==
Apart from government primary school and middle School one High School is located here (S.S.P.High School). Several other public schools are also available here.

== Economy ==
Narahia supports a business hub.

Narahia hosts a branch of State Bank of India branch (IFSC code -SBIN0015928) and Uttar Bihar Gramin Bank IFSC code- CBIN0R10001. It has two ATMs. One Post Office (PIN- 847108) is also available here.

== Transport ==
National Highway 27 and National Highway 104 pass through Narahia. The closest railway station is Nirmali (Station code- NMA) and Ghoghardiha. The Narahia bazaar is located alongside the East West Corridor National Highway-27.

The nearest airport is Patna Airport some 200 km away. Darbhanga Airport is about 65 km .
