= National Highway 115 (India) =

National highway in India

National Highway 115
- Map of National Highway 115 in red

Major junctions
- From: Dum Duma
- To: Roing

Location
- Country: India
- States: Assam

Highway system
- Roads in India; Expressways; National; State; Asian
← NH 37	→ NH 115

National Highway 115 is a national highway of India. It starts from Dum Duma and terminates at Roing in the Indian state of Assam.
