= National Highway 141 (India) =

National highway in India

National Highway 141
- Map of National Highway 141 in red

Route information
- Length: 31 km (19 mi)

Major junctions
- From: Gandhi Dam
- To: Kandla Port

Location
- Country: India
- States: Gujarat

Highway system
- Roads in India; Expressways; National; State; Asian

National Highway 141 is a national highway of India.
