= National Highway 149 (India) =

National highway in India

National Highway 149
- Map of National Highway 149 in red

Major junctions
- From: Pallahara
- To: Banarpal Square

Location
- Country: India
- States: Odisha

Highway system
- Roads in India; Expressways; National; State; Asian
← NH 32	→ NH 79

National Highway 149 is a national highway of India.

== Old Route & New Re-Alignment ==
Pallahara - Samal Barrage - Godibandha - Talcher - Nuahata was the old alignment of NH 149. But from 2024, NH 149 alignment was changed to Nauhatta - Talcher - Godibandha - Bajrakote - Rengali - Deogarh. The old alignment of Pallahara - Samal Barrage - Godibandha - Talcher is new labeled as NH 53. This has ensured trucks & vehicles reaching the 6 lane wide NH49 very quickly. The old route of NH53 via Rengali-Deogarh used to take a long time as it had multiple ghat sections.
