= Patacharkuchi =

- town
- Location in Assam, India Patacharkuchi (India)
- Coordinates: 26°31′0″N 91°16′0″E
- Country: India
- State: Assam
- District: Bajali
- Elevation: 45 m (148 ft)

Languages
  - Official: Assamese
- Time zone: UTC+5:30 (IST)
- PIN: 781326
- Vehicle registration: AS
- Coastline: 0 kilometres (0 mi)
- Nearest city: Pathsala, Nalbari, Barpeta Road, Sarupeta
- Lok Sabha constituency: Barpeta

Patacharkuchi is a town in Bajali district, Assam, India.

== Geography ==
It is located at an elevation of 45 m above MSL.

== Location ==
Located in the Bajali Subdivision of Barpeta district. National Highway 152 starts at Patacharkuchi and ends at Indo-Bhutan Border. It is located on the bank of river Kaldia. NH 31 passes through it. NH 31 is actually Gohain Kamal Ali which was built by Senapati Gohain-Kamal of Beer Chilarai of Koch kingdom.

== About Patacharkuchi ==
Patacharkuchi, the name came from Patshar kuchi or king's place, was the administrative center of the Bajali Pargana since long time back. In 1548 AD Koch king Narnarayana appointed Purosottam Dev Choudhury (Bojeila Choudhury) as the Choudhury (chief administrative officer) for Bajali Pargona. Later Ahom and Mughol kings also made Patacharkuchi the administrative center. It remained so until recently the administrative center was shifted to Pathsala as the sub divisional center.

Patacharkuchi Vidyapith is one of the oldest higher secondary schools established in 1935 by Late Harendra Nath Sarma and Late Hareshwar Dev Choudhury. Late Sarma was the first principal (that time headmaster) of the school. In 1960 the school opened the higher secondary classes with three streams arts, science and commerce.

Patacharkuchi is strategically placed on the bank of river Kaldia. In the early 19th century, a dak bungalow (a rest camp for the Post man and Government officers) and a thana (police station) was established by the British. This was the only police station in Bajali circle. Patacharkuchi Nimna Buniyadi School (Primary school) is one of the oldest primary school in that area established way back in 1862. By 1976, education in Patacharkuchi was advanced with a degree college named Pragjyoti College. Later the location and name of the college was changed to Nirmal Haloi College.

In 1965, a girls high school was established to promote the woman education in that area and that was a giant leap toward woman empowerment in that region. The school was founded by its founding president Dr. Homeswar Devchoudhury with his hard work and small contributions from villagers of nearby villages. Now Patacharkuchi has four more English medium high schools.

Dr. Rabin Dev Choudhury from Patacharkuchi was the first person from North East India to be director general of the National Museum in New Delhi.

The entire area is surrounded by lush greenery and paddy fields. Agriculture is still the primary activity like any other typical places in Assam.

== Educational institutions ==
Nirmal Haloi College, Patacharkuchi, the only degree college with B.A and B.com.

Patacharkuchi Vidyapith Higher Secondary School, established in 1935 and is one of the beacons in educational filed in this region.

Patacharkuchi Balika Vidyapith, Girls School up to HSLC level.

Bajali Teacher's Training Institute

Jnanpith Jatia Vidyalaya

Jnandweep Academy

Sarkardeva Sishu Niketan

62 No. Patacharkuchi Primary school

New vision school

Zenith Academy

== Cultural educational institutions ==
- Bajali Art Academy (affiliated to Nalbari Art School)
- Srishti Bikash Kendra
- Jnanpith Sangeet Vidyalaya (affiliated to Bhatkhande sangeet Vidyalaya, Lucknow)
- Sudhakantha Sangeet Vidyalaya (affiliated to Bhatkhande sangeet Vidyalaya, Lucknow)
