= North Salmara =

- Sub-division
- Location in Assam, India North Salmara (India)
- Coordinates: 26°22′0″N 90°36′0″E
- Country: India
- State: Assam
- District: Bongaigaon

Languages
  - Official: Assamese
- Time zone: UTC+5:30 (IST)
- ISO 3166 code: IN-AS
- Vehicle registration: AS-
- Coastline: 0 kilometres (0 mi)
- Nearest city: Bongaigaon
- Climate: Tropical monsoon (Köppen)

North Salmara is a sub-division in Bongaigaon district, Assam, India. The sub-division is headquartered at Abhayapuri.

== Geography ==
It is located at 26°22′0″N 90°36′0″E at an elevation of 40 m above MSL.

== Location ==
National Highway 31B starts from North Salmara.

== Tourist places ==
Mahadev Hill, Nigamghola, Kakoijana Reserve forest, Taamranga Lake, Dolani Beel, Abhayapuri, 10th-century Ganesh Temple, Koya Eco Park, The Great Giant Banyan Tree, Jogighopa Cave
