= Sonbarsa =

Sonbarsa सोनबर्षा
- Village development committee
- Location in Nepal
- Coordinates: 27.22°N 84.79°E
- Country: Nepal
- Zone: Narayani Zone
- District: Parsa District

Population (2011)
  - Total: 7,158
- Time zone: UTC+5:45 (Nepal Time)

Sonbarsa is a village development committee in Parsa District in the Narayani Zone of southern Nepal.

== Demographics ==
At the time of the 2011 Nepal census it had a population of 7,158 people living in 1114 individual households. There were 3,664 males and 3,494 females at the time of census.
