= Kuthannur-I =

- village
- Country: India
- State: Kerala
- District: Palakkad

Population (2011)
  - Total: 17,471

Languages
  - Official: Malayalam, English
- Time zone: UTC+5:30 (IST)
- PIN: 6XXXXX
- Vehicle registration: KL-

Kuthannur-I is a village in Palakkad district in the state of Kerala, India.

== Demographics ==
As of the 2011 India census, Kuthannur-I had a population of 17,471 with 8,450 males and 9,021 females.
