= National Highway 110 (India) =

National highway in India

National Highway 110
- Map of National Highway 110 in red

Route information
- Length: 76 km (47 mi)

Major junctions
- From: Siliguri
- To: Darjeeling.

Location
- Country: India
- States: West Bengal :76 km (47 mi)
- Primary destinations: Kurseong

Highway system
- Roads in India; Expressways; National; State; Asian
← NH 10	→ NH 10

National Highway 110 (NH 110), formerly known as NH 55 and popularly called the Hill Cart Road, is a 77 kilometre-long national highway in West Bengal, India, that links Siliguri to Darjeeling. This highway passes through Sukna, Tindharia, Kurseong, Sonada and Ghoom.

== Route ==
The highway begins at Darjeeling More in Siliguri. It ascends to Darjeeling, covering a distance of approximately 77 kilometres. The 32km stretch between Kurseong and Darjeeling is exclusively served by NH 110, passing through urban locations like Jorebangla, Ghoom, Rongbull, and Sonada. The road traverses densely populated areas, where encroachment from houses and shops has reduced the scope for widening in many narrow sections.

== See also ==
- List of national highways in India
- National Highways Development Project
- Transport in Bihar
