= National Highway 127 (India) =

National highway in India

National Highway 127
- Map of National Highway 127 in red

Route information
- Length: 42 km (26 mi)

Major junctions
- Barghat Flyover end: Nagaon
- New Gatanga
- Kaliabor Flyover end: Jakhalabandha Town

Location
- Country: India
- States: Assam

Highway system
- Roads in India; Expressways; National; State; Asian
← NH 27	→ NH 715

Old NH-37 is now National Highway 127. It's a national highway of India. It connects Nagaon, New Gatanga and Jakhalabandha in Highway of Assam. New Gatanga Highway (2.5KM) is a Part of this Highway Road.

== Route ==
National Highway 127 connects mainly Nagaon District's Uriagaon, Puranigudam, Samaguri, New Gatanga, Rangagorah, Amoni, Missa, Kaliabor Tiniali, Kuwaritol and Jakhalabandha Town. This road under as Asian Highway 1 (AH-1) and Assam Trunk Road (AT Road)

== New Gatanga Highway ==
New Gatanga Highway is a Main Road of New Gatanga. New Gatanga Highway also Known as New Gatanga Road. New Gatanga Highway is under AT Road, NH-127, AH-1. This road Total Length 2.5 KM. New Gatanga Highway Located in New Gatanga. This is a complete 4 Lane High Speed Road. This Road Start Point is New Gatanga West Crossing and End Point is New Gatanga East Crossing (New Gatanga Engineering College Gate)

== New Gatanga ==
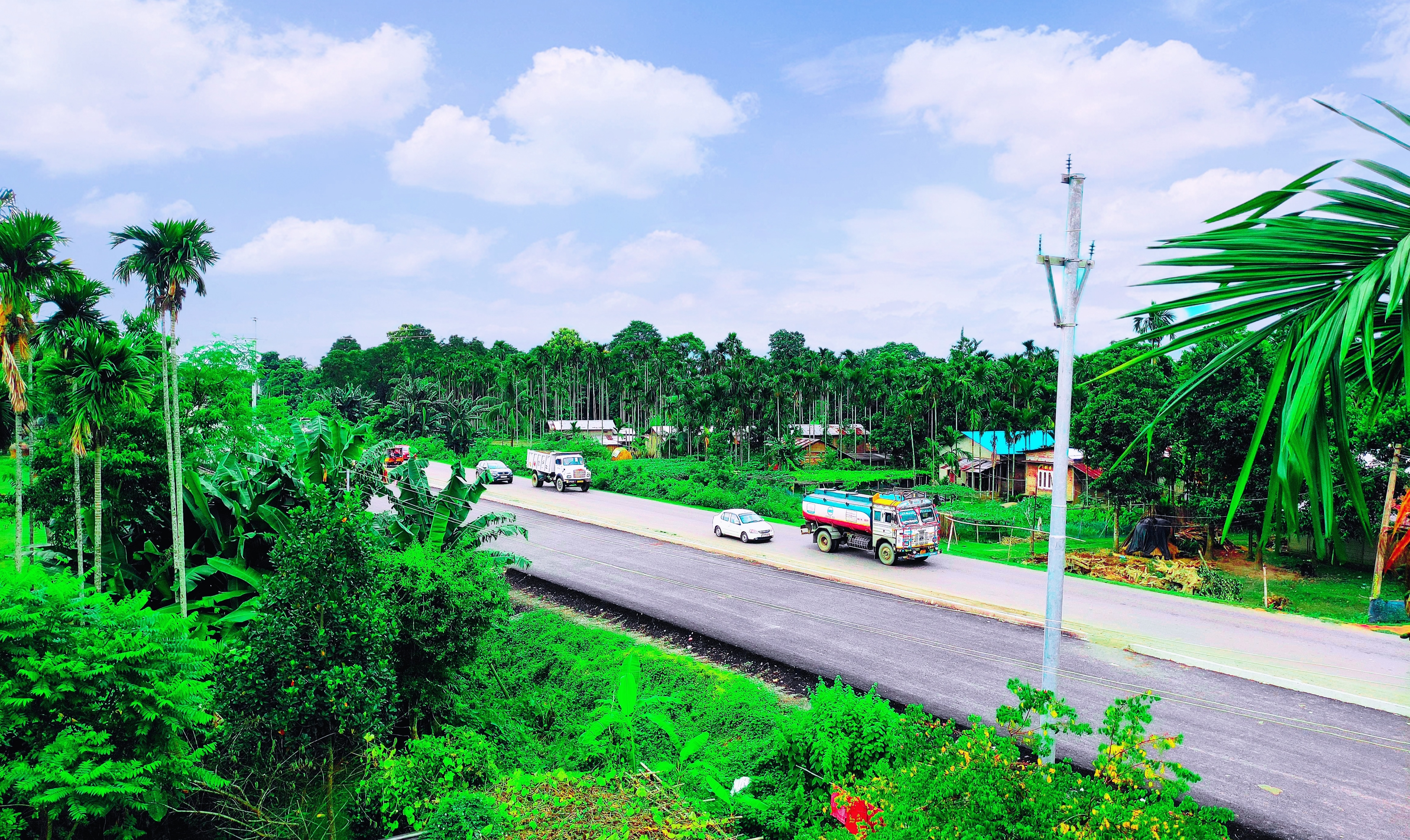
New Gatanga Highway

New Gatanga is a Town of Nagaon District. New Gatanga Located New Gatanga Highway. New Gatanga old name is Gotonga. National Highway 127 (New Gatanga Highway) & Kolong River Passes through the center of New Gatanga Village. New Gatanga Famous for newly established New Gatanga Engineering College (Nagaon Engineering College). New Gatanga Culturally famous for Gatanga Temple Naam Kirtan Festival & Shitala Puja & Mela. New Gatanga also Known as Temple City. New Gatanga famous Building Landmark is Gatanga Shopping Complex- Building it's also located near New Gatanga Highway. New Gatanga Total Population is more than 3000. New Gatanga is Now Developed Industries, Educational Sectors, Highway Connectivity & more. New Gatanga also have many fisheries like Gatanga Beel, Gatanga Fisheries Point, Gatanga-Kuthani Beel etc. The Kolong River, A tributary of Brahmaputra River flows through in the New Gatanga and is the border between the regions of New Gatanga and Chokitup.

New Gatanga Divided in 4 Sectors: New Gatanga North (Central Division), New Gatanga East, New Gatanga West, New Gatanga South

New Gatanga North (Central Division)- New Gatanga Business Hub, New Gatanga Petrol Pump, New Gatanga Highway, Gatanga Temple, Gatanga Shopping Complex- Building.

New Gatanga East- New Gatanga Engineering College, Food Craft Institute, New Gatanga Educational Hub.

New Gatanga West- Gatanga Bengali LP School, New Dasgupta Market

New Gatanga South- Gatanga Fisheries & Reserve Area.

New Gatanga Official Language: Assamese

New Gatanga Mostly Spoken Language: Bengali

New Gatanga Headquarters: New Gatanga Central Division

New Gatanga Nearest Town: Nagaon (25 KM), Tezpur (38 KM)

New Gatanga Nearest Railway Station: Samaguri (3KM), Amoni (5KM), Chaparmukh Junction (48KM)

New Gatanga Nearest Bus Stop: New Gatanga Highway Bus Stand

New Gatanga Nearest Airport: Tezpur Airport (42KM), Guwahati Airport (160KM)

New Gatanga Famous College/University: New Gatanga Engineering College (Nagaon Engineering College), Food Craft Institute.

New Gatanga Famous Temple: Gatanga Temple.

New Gatanga Famous Festival: Naam Kirtan Festival & Shitala Puja.
