= National Highway 106 (India) =

National highway in India

National Highway 106
- Map of the National Highway 106 in red

Route information
- Part of AH1 AH2
- Length: 82 km (51 mi)

Major junctions
- From: Shillong
- To: Nongstoin

Location
- Country: India
- States: Meghalaya

Highway system
- Roads in India; Expressways; National; State; Asian
← NH 6	→ NH 106

National Highway 106 (NH 106) is a highway in India running through the Indian state of Meghalaya. It connects Shillong and Nongstoin. The small stretch from Shillong to junction near Mylliem is part of Asian highway network AH1 and AH2.

== See also ==
- List of national highways in India
- National Highways Development Project
