= National Highways Development Project =

Project to upgrade major highways in India

The National Highways Development Project (NHDP) was a project of four laning of existing national highways and six laning of selected major national highways of India. The project was started in 1998 under the leadership of Prime Minister, Atal Bihari Vajpayee. National Highways account for only about 2% of the total length of roads, but carry about 40% of the total traffic across the length and breadth of the country. This project is managed by the National Highways Authority of India (NHAI) under the Ministry of Road, Transport and Highways. The NHDP represents 49,260 km of roads and highways work and construction in order to boost economic development of the country. The government has planned to end the NHDP program in early 2018 and subsume the ongoing projects under a larger Bharatmala project.

The Network of National Highways in India

== Project phases ==
The project is composed of the following phases:

- Phase I: The Golden Quadrilateral (GQ; 5,846 km) connecting the four major cities of Delhi, Mumbai, Chennai and Kolkata. This project, connecting four metro cities, is 5,846 km (3,633 mi). Total cost of the project is Rs.300 billion (US$6.8 billion), funded largely by the government’s special petroleum product tax revenues and government borrowing. In January 2012, India announced the four-lane GQ highway network as complete.
- Phase II: North-South and East-West corridors comprising national highways connecting four extreme points of the country. The North–South and East–West Corridor (NS-EW; 7,142 km) connecting Srinagar in the north to Kanyakumari in the south, including spur from Salem to Kanyakumari (Via Coimbatore and Kochi) and Silchar in the east to Porbandar in the west. Total length of the network is 7,142 km (4,438 mi). As of 31 October 2016, 90.99% of the project had been completed, 5.47% of the project work is under Implementation and 3.52% of the total length is left. It also includes Port connectivity and other projects — 435 km (270 mi). The final completion date to 28 February 2009 at a cost of Rs.350 billion (US$8 billion), with funding similar to Phase I.
- Phase III: The government on 12 April 2007 approved NHDP-III to upgrade 12,109 km (7,524 mi)of national highways on a Build, Operate and Transfer (BOT) basis, which takes into account high-density traffic, connectivity of state capitals via NHDP Phase I and II, and connectivity to centres of economic importance.
- Phase IV: The government on 18 June 2008 approved widening 20,000 km (12,000 mi) of highway that were not part of Phase I, II, or III. Phase IV will convert existing single-lane highways into two lanes with paved shoulders.
- Phase V: As road traffic increases over time, a number of four-lane highways will need to be upgraded/expanded to six lanes. On 5 October 2006 the government approved for upgrade of about 5,000 km (3,100 mi) of four-lane roads.
- Phase VI: The government is working on constructing 1,000 km (620 mi) expressways that would connect major commercial and industrial townships. It has already identified 400 km (250 mi) of Vadodara (earlier Baroda)-Mumbai section that would connect to the existing Vadodara (earlier Baroda)-Ahmedabad section. The World Bank is studying this project. The project will be funded on BOT basis. The 334 km (208 mi) Expressway between Chennai—Bangalore and 277 km (172 mi) Expressway between Kolkata—Dhanbad has been identified and feasibility study and DPR contract has been awarded by NHAI.
- Phase VII: This phase calls for improvements to city road networks by adding ring roads to enable easier connectivity with national highways to important cities. In addition, improvements will be made to stretches of national highways that require additional flyovers and bypasses given population and housing growth along the highways and increasing traffic. The government has planned to invest Rs. 16,680 Cr for this phase. The 19 km (12 mi) long Chennai Port—Maduravoyal Elevated Expressway is being executed under this phase.

National Highways Development Project at a glance
NHDP Phase	Particulars	Length	Indicative cost ₹ ( in cr)
NHDP-I & II	Balance work of GQ and EW-NS corridors	13,000 km (8,100 mi)	42,000
NHDP-III	4-laning	10,000 km (6,200 mi)	55,000
NHDP-IV	2-laning	20,000 km (12,000 mi)	25,000
NHDP-V	6-laning of selected stretches	5,000 km (3,100 mi)	17,500
NHDP-VI	Development of expressways	1,000 km (620 mi)	15,000
NHDP-VII	Ring Roads, Bypasses, Grade Separators, Service Roads etc.	700 km (430 mi)	15,000
	Total	45,000 km (28,000 mi)	1,690,500 (Revised to 2,200,000)

Note: 1 crore= 10 million

Timeline of the National Highways Development Project
Priority	NHDP Phase	Length (km)	Status	Approval	Completion Target
1	Phase I	5,846 km (3,633 mi)	Complete	December 2000	December 2006
2	Phase II	7,300 km (4,500 mi)	Complete	December 2003	December 2009
3	Phase III A	4,000 km (2,500 mi)	Largely completed	March 2005	December 2009
4	Phase V	6,500 km (4,000 mi)	Largely completed	November 2005	December 2012
5	Phase III B	6,000 km (3,700 mi)	Largely completed	March 2006	December 2012
6	Phase VII A	700 km (430 mi)	Partially completed / transferred	December 2006	December 2012
7	Phase IV A	5,000 km (3,100 mi)	Transferred to Bharatmala or later programmes	December 2006	December 2012
8	Phase VII B		Transferred / not implemented as NHDP	December 2007	December 2013
9	Phase IV B	5,000 km (3,100 mi)	Transferred to Bharatmala or later programmes	December 2007	December 2013
10	Phase VI A	400 km (250 mi)	Completed or transferred	December 2007	December 2014
11	Phase VII C		Transferred / not implemented as NHDP	December 2008	December 2014
12	Phase IV C	5,000 km (3,100 mi)	Transferred to Bharatmala or later programmes	December 2008	December 2014
13	Phase VI B	600 km (370 mi)	Transferred / superseded	December 2008	December 2015
14	Phase IV D	5,000 km (3,100 mi)	Transferred to Bharatmala or later programmes	December 2009	December 2015

"Financing of the National Highway Development Programme" (PDF). Archived from the original (PDF) on 28 February 2007.

== Status from NHAI website ==
National Highways Development Project is being implemented in all phases. The present phases are improving more than 49,260 km of arterial routes of NH network to international standards. The project-wise details of NHDP all phases is below as of 18 May 2021:

NATIONAL HIGHWAY DEVELOPMENT PROJECT(NHDP)
Projects		Total Length(Km.)	Already 4/6 Laned(Km.)	Under Implementation (Km.)	Contracts Under Implementation (No.)	Balance length for award(Km.)
NHDP	GQ	5,846	5,846 (100.00%)	0	0	-
NHDP	NS - EW Ph. I & II	7,142	6,568	300	28	274
NHDP	Port Connectivity	435	383	52	7	-
NHDP	NHDP Phase III	11,809	7,621	2,161	71	2,027
NHDP	NHDP Phase IV	13,203	4,058	6,050	105	3,095
NHDP	NHDP Phase V	6,500	2,564	1,428	33	2,508
NHDP	NHDP Phase VI	1,000	-	184	9	816
NHDP	NHDP Phase VII	700	22	94	4	584
NHDP	NHDP Total	46,635	27,062	10,269	257	9,304
Others (Ph.-I, Ph.-II & Misc.)		2,048	1,743	305	18	-
SARDP -NE		110	110	0	1	-
Total by NHAI		48,589	28,915*	10,574	276	9,304
*Total 20,000 km was approved under NHDP Phase IV, out of which 13,203 km was assigned to NHAI and remaining Km with MoRTH.

== Subsummation in Bharatmala project ==
National Highway Development Project will close by first half of 2018, with the launch of Bharatmala project. 10,000 km of highway construction left under NHDP will be merged with Phase I of the Bharatmala. Following the launch of Bharatmala Pariyojana in 2017, the remaining works under the NHDP were subsumed into Bharatmala Phase I. Concurrently, the government of India launched complementary infrastructure programmes such as Sagarmala for port led development and Setu Bharatam for the construction of road over bridges and under passes on National Highways.

== See also ==
Similar rail development

- Future of rail transport in India, rail development

Similar roads development

- Bharatmala
  - Diamond Quadrilateral, Subsumed in Bharatmala
  - Golden Quadrilateral, completed national road development connectivity older scheme
  - North-South and East-West Corridor, Subsumed in Bharatmala
- India-China Border Roads, Subsumed in Bharatmala
- Expressways of India
- Setu Bharatam, river road bridge development in India

Similar ports and river transport development

- Indian Rivers Inter-link
- List of national waterways in India
- Sagar Mala project, national water port development connectivity scheme

Similar air transport development

- Indian Human Spaceflight Programme
- UDAN, national airport development connectivity scheme

Highways in India

- List of national highways in India

General

- Transport in India
