= Transport in Bihar =

This article deals with the system of transport in Bihar, both public and private.

== Road transport ==
Bihar has national highways with total length of 5,358 km (3,329 mi) and state highways with total length of 4,006 km (2,489 mi). Also. Bihar has 921 km (572 mi) of proposed Expressways.

The state is being equipped with more sustainable energy sources, CNG filling stations are being put up in different cities.

To manage overall road transport facilities in the state, Bihar State Road Transport Corporation (BSRTC) was set up in 1959 under the provisions of Road Transport Corporation Act, 1950.

BSRTC operates and maintains a fleet of more than 300 buses connecting all cities and towns within state of Bihar and neighboring states too. BSRTC not only connects every nook and corner of the state but also links this state with other surrounding regions including Uttar Pradesh, Jharkhand, Chhattisgarh, West Bengal and Odisha. However, contract for operation and maintenance of the buses has been given to two private companies viz. GIPL and Royal Cruiser. This contract is based upon public-private partnership (PPP)

=== Expressways ===
Expressways in Bihar are as follows:

==== Within Patna city ====
These are intra-city short expressways.

Name	States	Total Length (km/mi)	Length Bihar (km/mi)	Cost (₹cr)	Type	Status	Direction	Comment
Outer Ring Road, Patna	Bihar	140 km (87 mi)	140 km (87 mi)		Greenfield	Under-construction	E to W	
Loknayak Ganga Path, Patna	Bihar	39.5 km (24.5 mi)	39.5 km (24.5 mi)	3,160	Greenfield	Under-construction phase 2	E to W	Riverfront project within Patna.

==== West-East ====
Within West-East direction listed from north to south:

Name	States	Total Length (km/mi)	Length Bihar (km/mi)	Cost (₹cr)	Type	Status	Direction	Comment
Gorakhpur-Siliguri Expressway	Uttar Pradesh, Bihar, West Bengal	519 km (322.5 mi)		32,000	Greenfield	Under- Survey	W to E	
Buxar-Bhagalpur Expressway (included Buxar-Patna Expressway and Munger-Mirzachowki Expressway)	Bihar	308 km (191.4 mi)	308 km (191.4 mi)		Mixed	Under- Survey	W to E	From UP border to WB border through central Bihar along Ganga river. Buxar-Bhagalpur Expressway includes Buxar-Patna Expressway (Purvanchal Expressway's extension, target completion 2026) and Munger-Mirzachowki Expressway (125 km, under-construction, completion 2028, Rs 8000 crore.

==== Northwest-Southeast ====
Within Northwest-Southeast direction listed from north to south:

Name	States	Total Length (km/mi)	Length Bihar (km/mi)	Cost (₹cr)	Type	Status	Direction	Comment
Varanasi–Ranchi–Kolkata Expressway	Uttar Pradesh, Bihar, Jharkhand, West Bengal	686 km (426 mi)		24,275	Greenfield	Under-construction	NW to SW	Via South West Bihar to Kolkatta.
Bettiah-Patna Expressway	Bihar	200 km (120 mi)		6,500	Greenfield	Under-construction	NW to SW	Target completion 2028.
Dumaria Ghat-Bakarpur Expressway (Gorakhpur-Patna Expressway)	Bihar	73 km (45 mi)	73 km (45 mi)	1,543	Greenfield	Under-construction	NW to Central SW	Connects to Gorakhpur via NH-27 & NH-28, target completion 2028.
Patna-Kolkata Expressway	Bihar, Jharkhand, West Bengal	450 km (280 mi)			Greenfield	DPR	NW to SW	To be taken up in Bharatmala-II.
Raxaul-Haldia Expressway	Bihar, Jharkhand, West Bengal	695 km (432 mi)		54,000	Greenfield	DPR	NW to SW	Under-construction, target completion 2028, via Samastipur.

==== Northeast-Southwest ====
Name	States	Total Length (km/mi)	Length Bihar (km/mi)	Cost (₹cr)	Type	Status	Direction	Comment
Darbhanga-Aurangabad Expressway (Amas-Darbhanga Expressway)	Bihar	199 km (123.7 mi)	199 km (123.7 mi)	8,000	Greenfield	Under-construction	Central NE to SW	Central Bihar to South West Bihar. Target completion 2028.
Sasaram-Patna Expressway (part of Sasaram-Patna-Purnia Expressway)	Bihar	118 km (73.3 mi)	118 km (73.3 mi)	4,000	Greenfield	Under-construction	NE to SW	Target completion 2028, Sasaram in northeast to Ara and Patna in southwest.
Patna-Purnia Expressway (part of Sasaram-Patna-Purnia Expressway)	Bihar	215 km (133.6 mi)	215 km (133.6 mi)	8,000	Greenfield	Under-construction	NE to SW	Target completion 2028: Patna in northeast to Purnia in southwest.

=== National Highways ===
Number	Length (km)	Length (mi)	Southern or western terminus	Northern or eastern terminus	Formed	Removed	Notes
NH 19GQ	206.0	128.0	Uttar Pradesh, Mohania, Aurangabad, Dobhi-Jharkhand		—	—	
NH 20	107.7	66.9	Junction with NH-31 near Bakhtiyarpur - Bihar Sharif, Nawada, Rajauli -Jharkhand		—	—	
NH 22	282.3	175.4	Sonbarsa (Indo/Nepal Border), Sitamarhi, Muzaffarpur, Hajipur, Patna, Punpun, Gaya, Bodh Gaya, Dobhi - Jharkhand.		—	—	
NH 27EW	487.0	302.6	Uttar Pradesh Gopalganj, Pipra Kothi, Muzaffarpur, Darbhanga, Forbesganj, Araria, Purnia, in the State of BiharWest Bengal		—	—	
NH 31	415.0	257.9	The highway starting from its junction with NH-27 near Unnao connecting Lalganj, Raebareli, Salon, Pratapgarh, Machhlishahr, Jaunpur, Varanasi, Ghazipur, Ballia in the State of Uttar Pradesh Chhapra, Hajipur, Bakhtiyarpur, Mokama, Begusarai, Khagaria, Bihpur, Kora, Katihar in the State of Bihar, Harishchanderpur and terminating at its junction with NH-12 near Pandua in the State of West Bengal.		—	—	
NH 33	332.0	206.3	The highway starting from its junction with NH-139 from Arwal connecting Jahanabad, Bandhuganj, Ekangarsarai, Biharsharif, Mokama, Luckeesarai, Munger, Bhagalpur, Kahalgaon in the State of Bihar, Sahibganj, Rajmahal, Barharwa in the State of Jharkhand and terminating at its junction with NH-12 near Farakka in the State of West Bengal.		—	—	
NH 119	93.0	57.8	The highway starting from its junction with NH-19 near Dehri connecting Akbarpur, Jadunathpur and terminating at Bihar/UP Border near Jadunathpur in the State of Bihar.		—	—	
NH 120	244.0	151.6	Junction with NH-20 near Bihar Sharif connecting Nalanda, Rajgir, Hisua, Gaya, Daudnagar, Nasriganj, Karakat, dawath, Nawanagar, and terminating at its junction with NH-922 near Dumraon		—	—	
NH 122	110.0	68.4	Junction with NH-22 near Muzaffarpur - Dholi, Mushrigharari - junction with NH-31 near Barauni		—	—	
NH 122A	31.8	19.8	Vishwanathpur Chowk on NH-22 - Koili, a- Nanpur on NH-527C		—	—	
NH 131	136.0	84.5	The highway starting from its junction with NH-31 near Bihpur connecting Kishanganj, Madhepura and terminating at Birpur in the State of Bihar near Indo/Nepal Border.		—	—	
NH 131A	81.2	50.5	West Bengal- Ahmedabad, Manihari, Katihar on NH-31 - Purnia on NH-27		—	—	
NH 133	10.9	6.8	The highway starting from its junction with NH-33 in the state of Bihar connecting Godda and terminating at Choupa More on NH-114A in the state of Jharkhand.		—	—	
NH 133B	5.0	3.1	Jharkhand Border- Manihar (NH-31)		—	—	
NH 139	153.6	95.4	The highway starting from its junction with NH-39 near Rajhara connecting Chhatarpur, Hariharganj in the State of Jharkhand, Aurangabad, Daudnagar, Arwal, Naubatpur and terminating at its junction with NH-31 near Patna in the State of Bihar.		—	—	
NH 219	46.8	29.1	The highway starting from its junction with new NH No. 19 near Mohania connecting Bhabhua, Chainpur, Chand in the State of Bihar and terminating at its junction with NH-19 near Chandauli in the state of Uttar Pradesh		—	—	
NH 227	215.0	133.6	The highway starting from its junction with NH-27 near Chakia connecting Narhar, Pakri Bridge, Madhuban, Shivhar, Sitamarhi, Harlakhi, Umgaon, Jaynagar, Laukaha, Laukahi and terminating at its junction with NH-27 near Narahia in the State of Bihar.		—	—	
NH 227A	137.0	85.1	Up / Bihar Border - Siwan - Mashrakh - Chakia		—	—	
NH 227F	36.3	22.6	The highway starting from its junction with NH- 227 near Chakia (Chorma chowk) connecting Pakridayal, Dhaka, Phulwaria Ghat and terminating at Bairgania in the state of Bihar near Indo / Nepal Border.		—	—	
NH 227J	30.0	18.6	The highway starting from its junction with NH- 227 near Saharghat connecting Uchhait, Benipatti and terminating at its junction with NH- 527B near Rahika in the state of Bihar		—	—	
NH 227L	20.4	12.7	The highway starting from its junction with NH- 227 near Umagaon connecting Basopatti and terminating at its junction with NH- 527B near Kalnahi in the state of Bihar.		—	—	
NH 231	209.0	129.9	The highway starting from its junction with NH-31 near Maheshkund in the State of Bihar connecting Sonbarsa Raj, Simri Bakhtiyarpur, Saharsa, Madhepura, Sarsi, Purnia and terminating at its junction with NH-31 near Kora in the State of Bihar.		—	—	
NH 319	125.0	77.7	Junction with NH-19 near Mohania - Dinara, Charpokhari, a- junction with NH-922 near Ara		—	—	
NH 322	58.0	36.0	The highway starting from its junction with NH-22 near Hazipur and terminating at its junction with NH-122 near Mushrigharari in the State of Bihar.		—	—	
NH 327	233.5	145.1	The highway starting from Galgalia on N.H-327 (W.B/Bihar) Thakurganj, Raniganj, Bahadurganj, Araria, Bhargama, Tribeniganj, Pipra, Supaul, (Bariyahi Bazar)Bangaon and terminating at Maheshi (Tarapeeth) in the state of Bihar.		—	—	
NH 327A	25.0	15.5	The highway starting from Supaul on NH-327 and terminating at Bhaptiahi on NH-27 in the state of Bihar.		—	—	
NH 331	65.0	40.4	The highway starting from its junction with NH-31 near Chhapra connecting Baniapur, and terminating at its junction with NH-27 near Muhumadpur the State of Bihar.		—	—	
NH 333	141.2	87.7	The highway starting from Bariyarpur on NH-33 connecting Kharagpur, Laxmipur, Jamui, Chakai in the state of Bihar-Jharkhand		—	—	
NH 333A	198.9	123.6	The highway starting from its junction with NH-33 near Bar Bigha connecting Shekhpura, Sikandra, Jamui, Jha-Jha, Banka in the State of Bihar and terminating at its junction with NH-133 near Godda in the State of Jharkhand.		—	—	
NH 333B	17.7	11.0	The highway starting from its junction with NH33 at Munger and terminating at its junction with NH No-31 at Khagaria in the state of Bihar.		—	—	
NH 431	69.0	42.9	The highway starting from its junction with NH-31 near Phatuha connecting Chandi, Harnaut and terminating at its junction with NH-31 near Barh in the State of Bihar.		—	—	
NH 527	9.3	5.8	The highway starting from its junction with NH-27 near Forbesganj and terminating at Jogbani in the State of Bihar.		—	—	
NH 527A	75.3	46.8	The highway starting from its junction with new NH No.527 B near Pokhrauni Chowk connecting Madhubani, Rampatti, Jhanjharpur, Samey Chowk, Awam, Laufa, Bheja, Bakaur and terminating at its junction with NH No. 327 near Parsarma in the State of Bihar.		—	—	
NH 527B	53.8	33.4	The highway starting from its junction with NH-27 near Darbhanga connecting Aunsi and terminating at its junction with NH-227 near Jaynagar in the State of Bihar.		—	—	
NH 527C	64.2	39.9	The highway starting from Majhauli on NH-27 connecting Katra, Jajuar, Pupri and terminating at Charout on NH-227 in the state of Bihar.		—	—	
NH 527D	67.2	41.8	The highway starting from its junction with NH-27 near Piprakothi connecting Sagauli, Raxaul, in the State of Bihar and terminating at Indo/Nepal Border.		—	—	
NH 531	95.0	59.0	The highway starting from its junction with NH-31 near Chhapra, Siwan and terminating at its junction with NH-27 near Gopalganj in the State of Bihar.		—	—	
NH 722	75.0	46.6	The highway starting from its junction with NH-22 near Muzaffarpur connecting Rewaghat and terminating at its junction with NH-31 near Chhapra in the State of Bihar.		—	—	
NH 727	112.0	69.6	The highway starting from its junction with NH-27 near Kushinagar in the State of Uttar Pradesh connecting Chhitanuni Rail-cum-Road Bridge, Bagaha, Lauriya, Bettiah and terminating at its junction with NH-527 D near Chhapwa in the State of Bihar.		—	—	
NH 727A	4.5	2.8	Uttar Pradesh and terminating at its junction with NH 227A near Mairwa		—	—	
NH 727AA	13.0	8.1	The highway starting from its junction with NH-727 near Manuapul connecting Patzirwa, Paknaha in the state of Bihar, Pipraghat and terminating at its junction with NH-730 near Sevrahi in the state of Uttar Pradesh.		—	—	
NH 922	138.0	85.7	The highway starting from its junction with NH-22 near Patna connecting Ara, Bhojpur and terminating near Buxar in the State of Bihar.		—	—	

== Rail transport ==
There are more than 700 railway stations in the state of Bihar. The East Central Railway is the main railway zone under which most of the railway stations fall. In recent times, from 2022-23 to 2025-26, a lot of railway projects have been completed and commissioned and many more projects are ongoing in the state of Bihar.

=== Urban Rail ===
- Patna Metro - Under construction
- Patna Monorail - Proposed
- Patna tram - defunct since 1903

== Water transport ==
Map showing national inland waterway-1 and various river ports or terminals along its stretch.

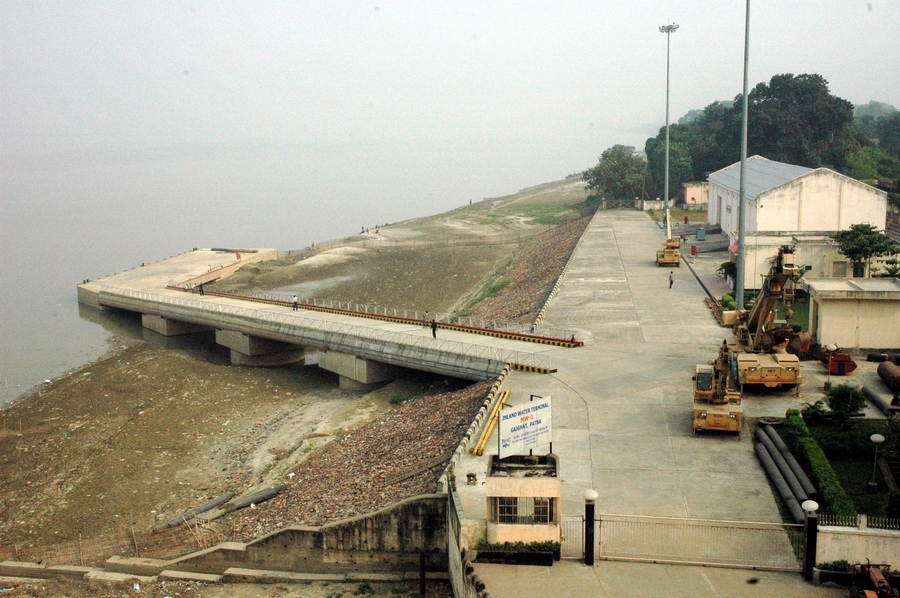
Patna river port on national inland waterway-1 at Gai Ghat

Bihar is connected by National Waterway No. 1 which was established in October 1986. This waterway has fixed terminals at Haldia, BISN (Kolkata), Pakur, Farrakka and Patna. It also has floating terminals facilities at Haldia, Kolkata, Diamond Harbour, Katwa, Tribeni, Baharampur, Jangipur, Bhagalpur, Semaria, Doriganj, Ballia, Ghazipur, Varanasi, Chunar and Allahabad.

== Air transport ==
Patna airport is well connected to cities like Delhi, Mumbai, Kolkata, Bengaluru and many other cities in India. It is categorized as a restricted international airport, with customs facilities to receive international chartered flights. Gaya Airport, is Bihar's only international airport and offers seasonal flights that connect the city to Thailand, Bhutan, and Myanmar. Airlines like IndiGo, SpiceJet and Air India connect various airports in Bihar to cities across India. Darbhanga Airport is another domestic airport in Bihar which is connected with various cities across India. The Darbhanga Airport was built as civil enclave.

City served	Airport name	ICAO	IATA	Category	Role
Bihta	Bihta Air Force Station	—	—	Defence	Air base
Bhagalpur	Bhagalpur Airport	—	—	Domestic	No scheduled flights
Darbhanga	Darbhanga Airport	VE89	DBR	Domestic	Civil enclave
Gaya	Gaya Airport	VEGY	GAY	Customs^{[GAY]}	Commercial
Jogbani	Jogbani Airport	—	—	Domestic	Closed
Munger	Munger Airport	—	—	Domestic	No scheduled flights
Muzaffarpur	Muzaffarpur Airport	VEMZ	MZU	Domestic	No scheduled flights
Patna	Jay Prakash Narayan Airport	VEPT	PAT	Customs^{[PAT]}	Commercial
Purnea	Purnea Airport	VEPU	PXN	Domestic	Civil enclave
Raxaul	Raxaul Airport	VERL	—	Domestic	Closed

- ^{GAY} The airport usually serves domestic flights only, but the city being a pilgrimage city, the airport operates seasonal flights to international destinations.
- ^{PAT} The airport is classified as a restricted international airport due to its short runway and serves only domestic flights.

== See also ==
- Ministry of Transport (Bihar)
- Transport in India
- Indian Railways
- National highways of India
  - List of national highways in India
- List of airports in India
- List of railway stations in India
- Bridges in Bihar
