= National Highway 31 (India) =

National highway in India

National Highway 31
- Map of National Highway 31 in red

Route information
- Part of AH42
- Length: 990 km (620 mi)

Major junctions
- West end: Gadan Khera Chauraha, Unnao
- East end: Kodubari Morh, Gazole

Location
- Country: India
- States: Uttar Pradesh, Bihar, West Bengal
- Primary destinations: Unnao, Lalganj, Raebareli, Salon, Pratapgarh, Machhlishahr, Jaunpur, Varanasi, Ghazipur, Ballia, Chhapra, Hajipur, Patna, Bakhtiyarpur, Barh, Mokama, Begusarai, Khagaria, Bihpur, Naugachia, Gosaingaon, Kursela, Kora, Katihar, Harishchandrapur, Tulshihata, Chanchal, Samsi, Malda

Highway system
- Roads in India; Expressways; National; State; Asian
← NH 27	→ NH 12

NH-31 (near Deedarganj in Patna)

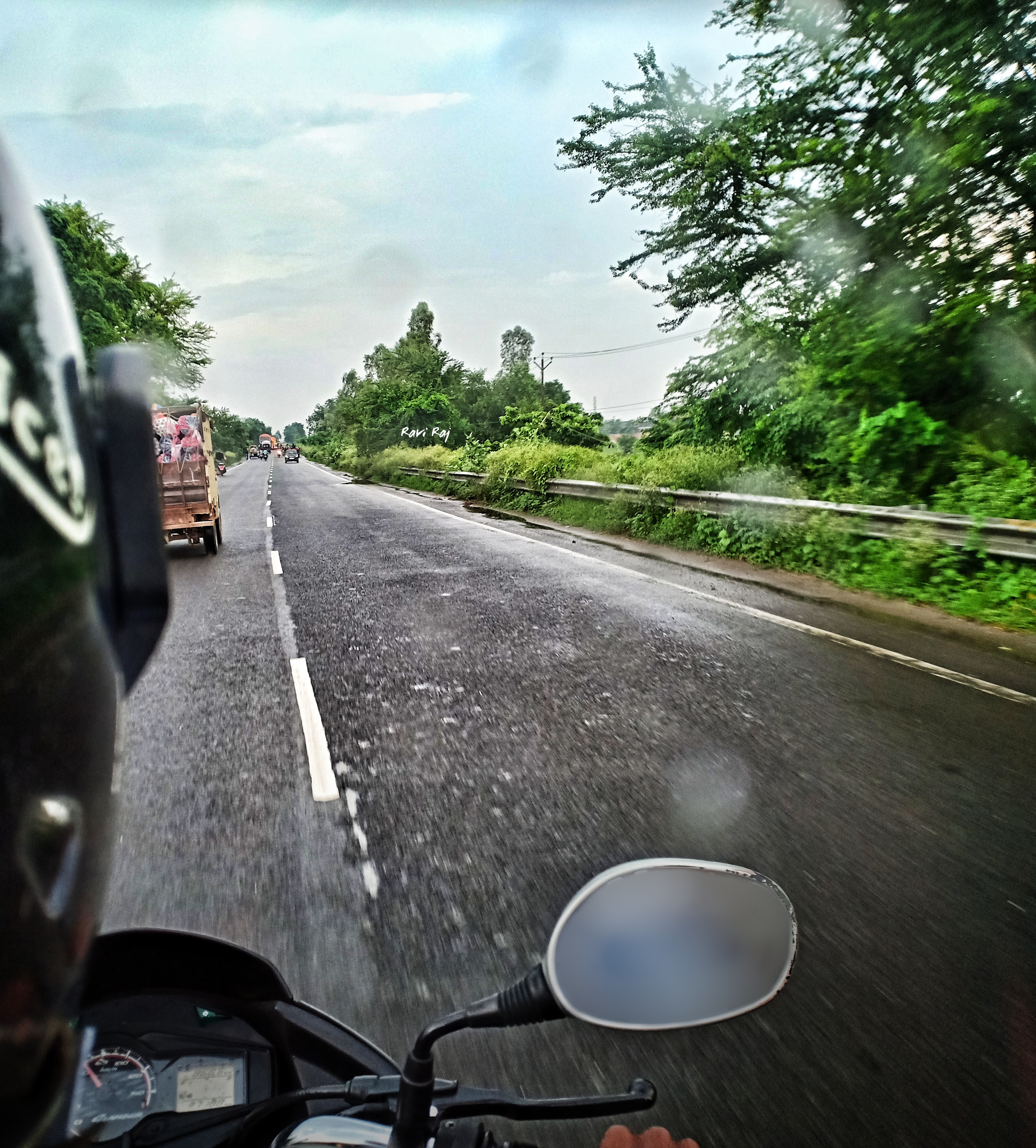
NH-31 (near Purnea)

National Highway 31 (NH 31) is a primary National highway of India. It starts from Gadan Khera in Unnao at Uttar Pradesh, passes through Bihar, and terminates at its crossing with State Highway 10 (West Bengal) at Kodubari Morh in Gazole at Malda district of West Bengal. The road continues as SH 10 (WB), which connects Gazole to Hili near Bangladesh Border (Hili Railway Station).

== Route ==
National highway 31 transits 1,047 kilometres (651 mi) across three states of India in east - west direction.

=== Uttar Pradesh ===
Unnao, Lalganj, Raebareli, Salon, Pratapgarh, Machhlishahr, Jaunpur, Babatpur, Varanasi, Ghazipur, Ballia, Suraimanpur

=== Bihar ===
Chhapra, Hajipur, Patna, Bakhtiyarpur, Barh, Mokama, Barauni, Begusarai, Khagaria, Naugachhia, kursela, korha, Katihar, maniyan, bastaul, pranpur, Labha,purnia,

=== West Bengal ===
Chandpur, Harishchandrapur, Tulsihata, Chanchal, Malatipur, Samsi, Akalpur, Kodubari Morh at Gazole.

== Junctions list ==
Uttar Pradesh

NH 27 Terminal at Unnao
NH 335 near Lalganj
NH 30 near Raebareli
NH 931A near Salon
NH 731A near Pratapgarh
NH 931 near Pratapgarh
NH 330 near Pratapgarh
NH 319D near Mungra Badshahpur
NH 731 near Jaunpur
NH 135A near Jaunpur
NH 128A near Jaunpur
NH 28 near Varanasi
NH 24 near Ghazipur
NH 128D near Phephna
NH 727B near Ballia

Bihar
NH 922 near Buxar
NH 531 near Chhapra
NH 331 near Chhapra
NH 722 near Chhapra
NH 22 near Hajipur
NH 322 near Hajipur
NH 922 near Patna
NH 431 near Fatuha
NH 20 near Bakhtiyarpur
NH 431 near Barh
NH 33 near Mokama
NH 122 near Barauni
NH 333B near Munger
NH 231 near Maheshkhunt
NH 131 near Bihpur
NH 231 near Kora
NH 131A near Katihar
NH 131A in labha
West Bengal
NH 12 Terminal near Malda
SH 10 (WB) near Kodubari Morh in Gazole.

== Interactive map ==
Map of NH31 in red, spur routes in blue

== Ongoing development ==
As per Satellite imagery from Google Maps, the national Highway 31 is being made 4 lane currently between Unnao & Raebareli, between Ghazipur & Ballia, between Bakhtiyarpur & Barauni, between Katihar & Labha. 4 lane Bypass is under construction between Labha & Harishchandrapur for bypassing Chandpur (West Bengal). 4 Lane bypass is under construction at Chanchal to bypass Chanchal Town bottleneck. Once these bypasses are built, the Highway length will shorten to 992.25 kilometres (616.56 mi) & reducing travel time. 4 lane stretch is already operational in patches between Raebareli & Ghazipur, between Hajipur & Bakhtiyarpur & between Katihar & Barauni.

== See also ==
- List of national highways in India
- List of national highways in India by state
