= National Highway 727B (India) =

National Highway in India

National Highway 727B

Route information
- Auxiliary route of NH 27
- Length: 129.4 km (80.4 mi)

Major junctions
- North end: Tamakuhi
- South end: Ballia

Location
- Country: India
- States: Uttar Pradesh

Highway system
- Roads in India; Expressways; National; State; Asian
| ← NH 27 | → NH 31 |

National Highway 727B, commonly referred to as NH 727B is a national highway in India. It is a secondary route of National Highway 27. NH-727B runs in the state of Uttar Pradesh in India.

== Route ==
NH727B connects , Tamakuhi, Bhingari, Bhatpar Rani, Salempur, Esharou, Bhagalpur, Ubhaon, Sikandrapur, Baheri, Sukhpura, Hanumanganj and Ballia in the state of Uttar Pradesh.

== Junctions ==
NH 27 Terminal near Tamakuhi.
NH 727A near Salempur
NH 227A near Karmi Juned
NH 31 Terminal near Ballia.

== See also ==
- List of national highways in India
- List of national highways in India by state
