= National Highway 327B (India) =

National highway in India

National Highway 327B
- Map of the National Highway in red

Route information
- Part of AH2

Major junctions
- From: NH 327 in Panitanki
- To: NH01 in Mechi Bridge

Location
- Country: India
- States: West Bengal

Highway system
- Roads in India; Expressways; National; State; Asian
← NH 327A	→ NH 327C

National Highway 327B, commonly called NH 327B is a national highway in state of West Bengal in India. NH 327B is smallest national highway in India. It is a branch of National Highway 327. NH 327B is a very small stretch linking border town Panitanki in India to border town Kakarbhitta in Nepal.

== Route ==
Panitanki to Mechi Bridge across Mechi River.

== See also ==
- List of national highways in India
