= National Highway 327AD (India) =

National highway in India

Route information
- Length: 10.63 km (6.61 mi)

Major junctions
- From: National Highway 327A
- To: National Highway 131

Location
- Country: India
- States: Bihar

Highway system
- Roads in India; Expressways; National; State; Asian

National Highway 327AD, commonly called NH 327AD, is a national highway in the state of Bihar in India. It is a secondary route of National Highway 27.

== See also ==
- List of national highways in India
