= National Highway 27 (India) =

National highway in India

National Highway 27
- National Highway 27 is shown in red on the map.
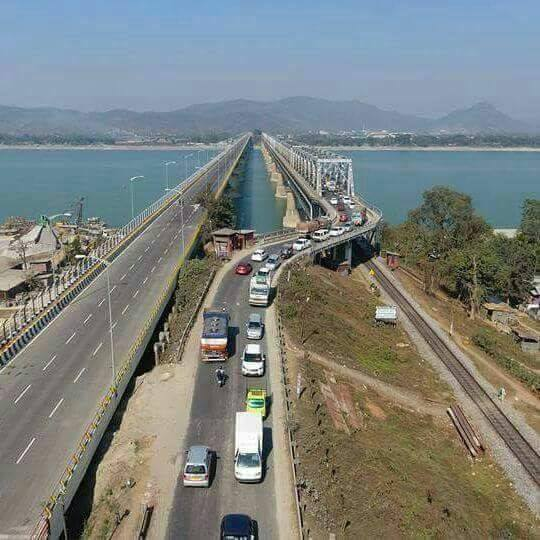
- New and Old Saraighat bridges

Route information
- Part of AH1 AH2 AH42 AH48
- Length: 3,507 km (2,179 mi)

Major junctions
- West end: NH 151 AD in Porbandar, Gujarat
- List: NH 51 in Porbandar, Gujarat; NH 47 in Bamanbore, Gujarat; NH 41 in Samakhiali, Gujarat; NH 68 in Radhanpur, Gujarat; NH 58 in Palanpur, Gujarat; NH 62 in Pindwara, Rajasthan; NH 58 in Udaipur, Rajasthan; NH 48 from Udaipur to Chittorgarh, Rajasthan; NH 56 in Chittorgarh, Rajasthan; NH 52 in Kota, Rajasthan; NE 4 in Karariya, Rajasthan; NH 46 in Shivpuri, Madhya Pradesh; NH 39 / NH 44 in Jhansi, Uttar Pradesh; NH 19 from Barah to Kanpur, Uttar Pradesh; NH 34 in Kanpur, Uttar Pradesh; NE 6 in Kanpur, Uttar Pradesh; NH 31 in Unnao, Uttar Pradesh; NE 10 in Unnao, Uttar Pradesh; NE 6 in Lucknow, Uttar Pradesh; NH 30 in Lucknow, Uttar Pradesh; NH 28 in Basti, Uttar Pradesh; NH 24 in Gorakhpur, Uttar Pradesh; NH 22 in Muzaffarpur, Uttar Pradesh; NH 12 in Dalkola, West Bengal; NH 10 in Siliguri, West Bengal; NH 17 in Dalkola, West Bengal; NH 15 in Baihata, Assam; NH 6 / NH 17 in Guwahati, Assam; NH 29 in Daboka, Assam
- East end: NH 37 in Silchar, Assam

Location
- Country: India
- States: Gujarat, Rajasthan, Madhya Pradesh, Uttar Pradesh, Bihar, West Bengal, Assam
- Primary destinations: Bamanbore - Morvi, Samakhiali - Radhanpur - Palanpur- Abu Road - Pindwara - Udaipur -Bansen - Chittaurgarh, Kota - Baran- Shivpuri - Karera - Jhansi - Kanpur - Lucknow - Barabanki - Ayodhya - Basti - Gorakhpur - Kushinagar - Gopalganj - Chakia - Muzaffarpur - Darbhanga - Jhanjharpur - Saraygarh - Simrahi - Forbesganj - Araria - Purnia - Dalkola - Siliguri - Bongaigaon - Rangia - Guwahati - Dispur - Dobaka - Haflong

Highway system
- Roads in India; Expressways; National; State; Asian
← NH 26	→ NH 28

National Highway 27 (NH 27) is an East-West National highway in India that starts in Porbandar and ends in Silchar. The highway passes through the states of Gujarat, Rajasthan, Madhya Pradesh, Uttar Pradesh, Bihar, West Bengal and Assam. NH-27 was laid and is maintained by the Ministry of Road Transport and Highways (MoRTH). It is the second longest National Highway in India (after NH-44) and is a part of NS-EW Corridor of NHAI.

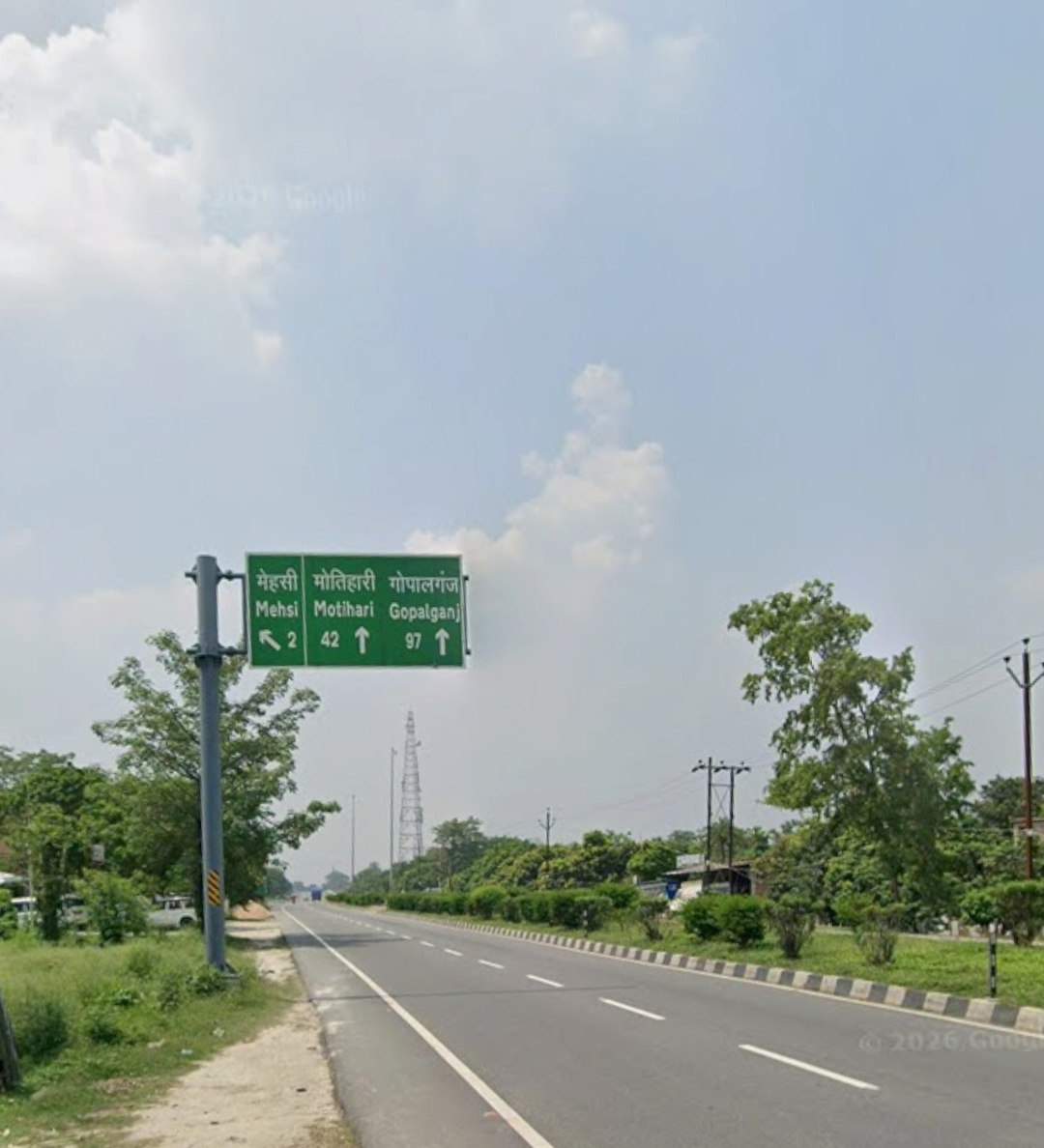
National Highway 27 near Mehsi, East Champaran, Bihar

== Route ==
National Highway 27 transits across seven states of India in east - west direction.

=== Gujarat ===
Porbandar, Kutiyana, Upleta, Dhoraji, Jetpur, Gondal, Rajkot, Bamanbore, Morvi, Samakhiali, Radhanpur, Thara, Deesa, Palanpur

=== Rajasthan ===
Abu Road, Pindwara, Udaipur, Mangalwar, Chittaurgarh, Kota, Baran

=== Madhya Pradesh ===
Shivpuri, Karera, Dinara

=== Uttar Pradesh ===
Jhansi, Orai Kanpur, Unnao, Lucknow, Barabanki, Ayodhya, Basti, Khalilabad, Gorakhpur, Kushinagar

=== Bihar ===
Gopalganj, Motihari, Chakia, Muzaffarpur, Darbhanga, Jhanjharpur, Supaul, Forbesganj, Araria, Purnia and Kishanganj.

=== West Bengal ===
Dalkhola, Islampur, Bagdogra, Siliguri, Jalpaiguri, Mainaguri, Dhupguri, Falakata, Coochbehar, Sonapur, Alipurduar, Kamakhyaguri Barobisha

=== Assam ===
Bongaigaon, Bijni, Howly, Patacharkuchi, Nalbari, Rangiya, Guwahati, Nagaon, Hojai, Lanka, Lumding, Haflong, Silchar

== Junctions list ==
Gujarat

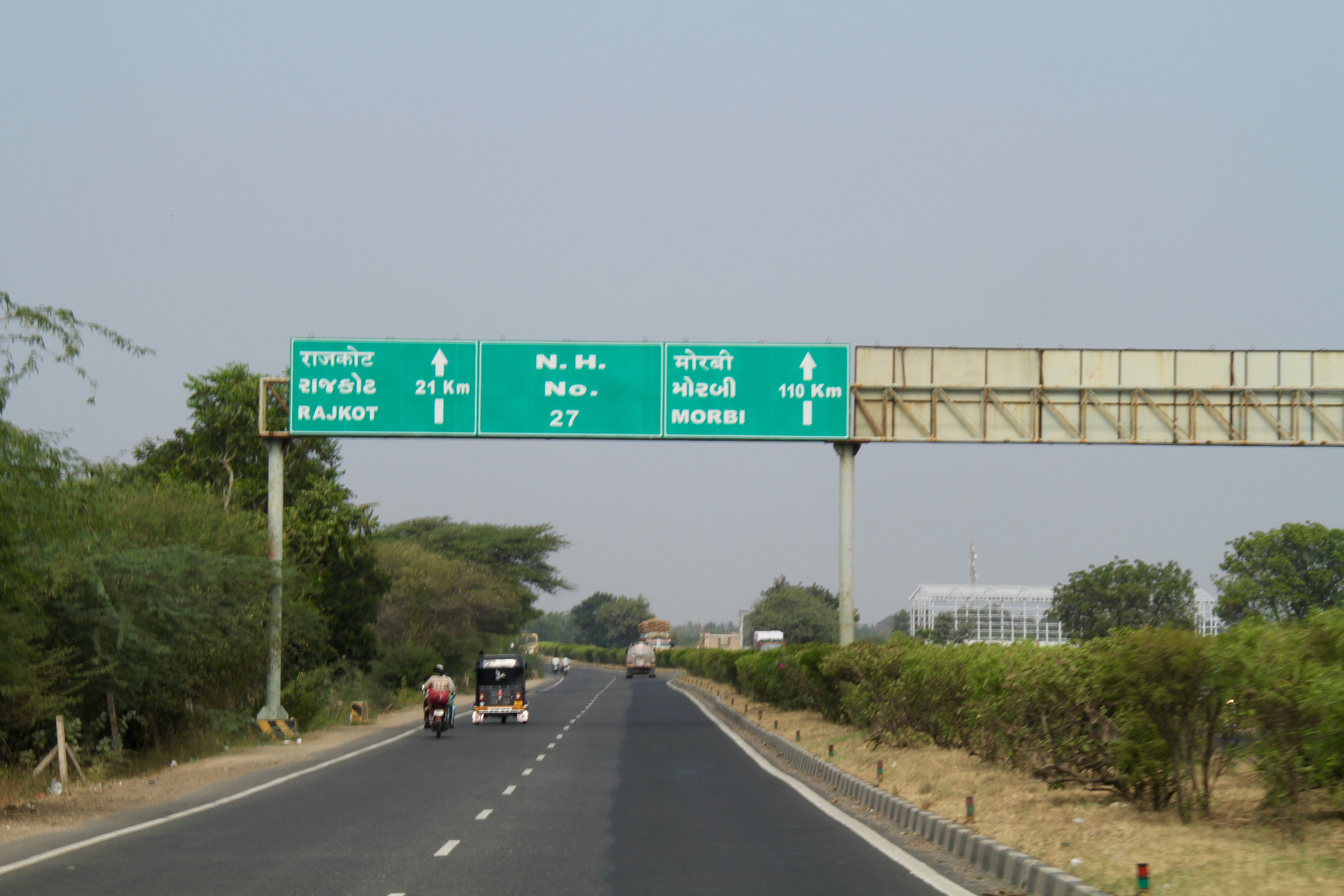
4 lane highway, Gujarat

NH 151AD Terminal near Porbandar
NH 51 near Porbandar
NH 927D near Dhoraji
NH 151 near Jetpur
NH 351 near Jetpur
NH 47 Interchange near Bamanbore
NH 41 Interchange near Samakhiali
NH 68 near Radhanpur
NH 168A near Deesa
Rajasthan

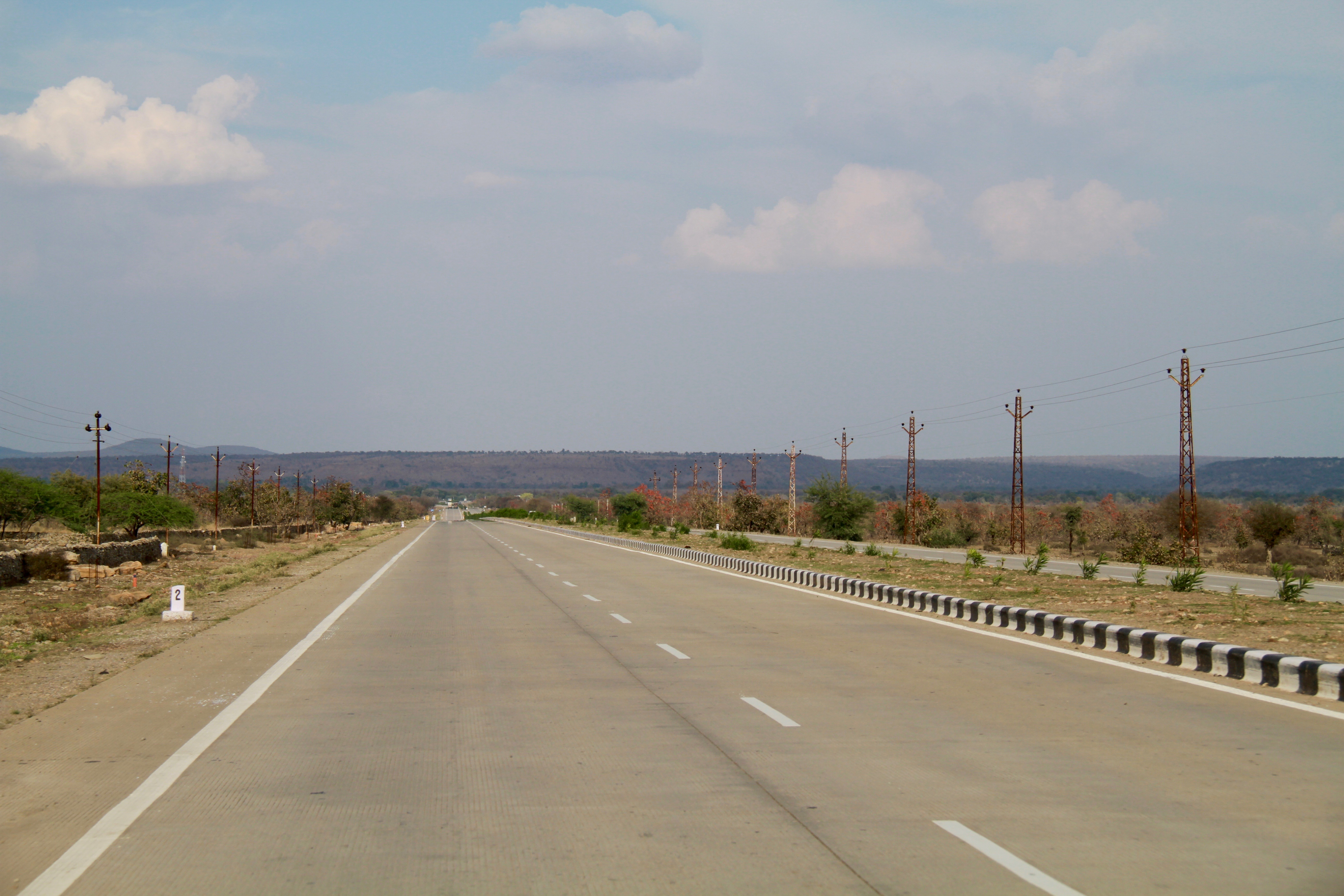
NH 27 in Rajasthan

NH 927A near Swaroopganj
NH 62 Interchange near Pindwara
NH 58 near Udaipur
NH 48 near Udaipur
NH 162 near Bhatevar (162EXT)
NH 48 interchange near Chittorgarh
NH 56 interchange near Chittorgarh
NH 758 near Ladpura
NH 52 near Kota
NH 752 interchange near Baran

Madhya Pradesh
NH 46 near Shivpuri

Uttar Pradesh

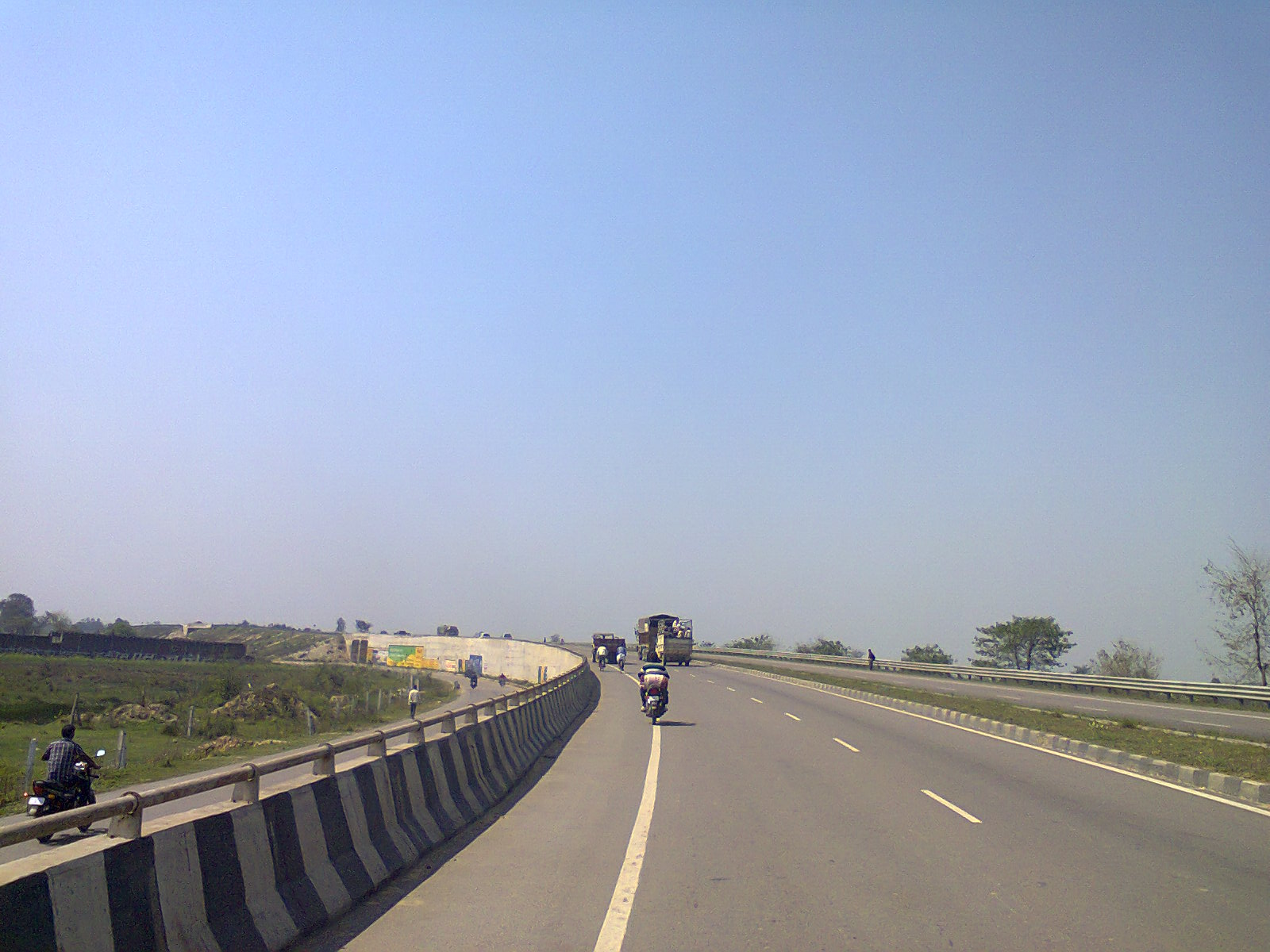
NH 27 & NH 28 shared route near Basti, Uttar Pradesh

NH 44 near Jhansi
NH 552 near Chirgaon
NH 519 near Bhognipur
NH 19 interchange near Barah village
NH 34 near Kanpur
NH 31 near Unnao
NH 30 at Lucknow
NH 927 near Barabanki
NH 330C near Ayodhya
NH 330A near Ayodhya
NH 330 near Ayodhya
NH 135A near Ayodhya
NH 227B near Ayodhya
NH 227A near Ayodhya
NH 28 near Basti
NH 24 near Gorakhpur
NH 727A near Gorakhpur
NH 727 near Kushinagar

Bihar

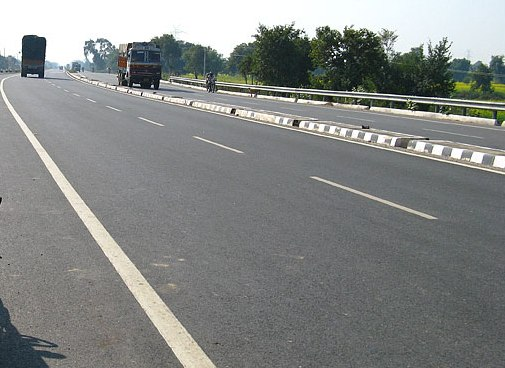
NH 27 in Bihar

NH 531 near Gopalganj]]
NH 227F near Chakia
NH 227A near Barauli
NH 227A near Chakia
NH 331 near Mohammadpur
NH 527D near Pipra Kothi
NH 227 near Chakia
NH 22 near Muzaffarpur
NH 122 near Muzaffarpur
NH 527C near Mehsi
NH 527B near Darbhanga
NH 527A near Jhanjharpur
NH 227 near Narahia
NH 122A near Mehsi
NH 327A near Bhaptiahi
NH 131 near Simrahi
NH 527 near Forbesganj
NH 327 near Araria
NH 231 near Purnia
NH 131A near Purnia

West Bengal
NH 12 near Dalkhola
NH 327C near Ghoshpukur
NH 327 near Bagdogra
NH 10 near Siliguri
NH 717 near Mainaguri
NH 517 near Dhupguri
NH 17 near Falakata
NH 317 near Salsabari

Assam

NH 127B near Srirampur
NH 117A near Garubhasa
NH 127C near Shyamthai
NH 117 near Bijni
NH 427 near Howly
NH 127A near Pathsala
NH 127E near Barama
NH 127D near Rangia
NH 15 near Baihata
NH 427 near Jalukbari
NH 17 near Guwahati
NH 6 near Jorabat
NH 715A near Nakhola
NH 627 near Nelle
NH 127 near Nagaon
NH 29 near Dabaka
NH 329 near Lumding
NH 627 near Jatinga, Haflong
NH 37 Terminal near Silchar

== Toll plazas ==
List of toll plazas (statewise) while going from Silchar to Porbandar (East to West).

Assam
Mikirati Hawgaon
Raha
Nazirakhat
Madanpur
Bijni (Dahalapara)
Patgaon
Srirampur
West Bengal
Paschim Madati
Surjapur
Kamakhyaguri (Guabari)
Dhupguri(Jaldhaka)
Bihar
Barsoni (Purnia)
Araria
Kosi Mahasetu
Raje
Chakia (Mehsi)
Maithi
Uttar Pradesh
Madhya Pradesh
Rajasthan
Udwariya
Malera
Gujarat

== Interactive map ==
Map of NH27 in red, spur routes in blue

== See also ==
- List of national highways in India
- List of national highways in India by state
