= National Highway 527 (India) =

National highway in India

National Highway 527
- Map of National Highway 527 in red

Route information
- Length: 14 km (8.7 mi)

Major junctions
- North end: NH08 in Jogbani at India/Nepal border
- South end: NH 27 in Forbesganj

Location
- Country: India
- States: Bihar

Highway system
- Roads in India; Expressways; National; State; Asian
← NH 427	→ NH 527A

National Highway 527 (NH 527) is a National Highway in India. NH 527 starts at NH-27 near Forbesganj and terminating at Jogbani in the State of Bihar. The entire stretch of this high way is about 9.26 km.

== See also ==
- List of national highways in India
- List of national highways in India by state
