= National Highway 227F (India) =

National Highway in India

National Highway 227F

Route information
- Auxiliary route of NH 27
- Length: 36.3 km (22.6 mi)

Major junctions
- South end: Chakia
- North end: Bairgania

Location
- Country: India
- States: Bihar

Highway system
- Roads in India; Expressways; National; State; Asian
← NH 227	→ NH 227J

National Highway 227F, commonly referred to as NH 227F is a national highway in Chakia, India. It is a secondary route of National Highway 27. NH-227F runs in the state of Bihar in India.

== See also ==
- List of national highways in India
- List of national highways in India by state
