= National Highway 727AA (India) =

National Highway in India

National Highway 727AA

Route information
- Auxiliary route of NH 27
- Length: 39 km (24 mi)

Major junctions
- East end: Manuapul (Bettiah)
- West end: Sevrahi

Location
- Country: India
- States: Bihar, Uttar Pradesh

Highway system
- Roads in India; Expressways; National; State; Asian
| ← NH 727 | → NH 730 |

National Highway 727AA, commonly referred to as NH 727AA is a national highway in India. It is a secondary route of National Highway 27. NH-727AA runs in the states of Bihar and Uttar Pradesh in India.

== Route ==
NH727AA connects Chaminia (Bettiah), Patjirwa, Srinagar and Sevrahi in the states of Bihar and Uttar Pradesh.

== Junctions ==
NH 727 Terminal near Manuapul (Bettiah).
NH 730 Terminal near Sevrahi.

== See also ==
- List of national highways in India
- List of national highways in India by state
