= NH 90 =

NH 90

- National Highway 90 (India)
- NHI NH90, medium-sized, twin-engine, multi-role military helicopter manufactured by NHIndustries.
