= Dhobwal =

Dhobwal is a small village in Saran (Chhapra) district of Baniapur block. It is just 4 km from Baniapur. It has two primary schools, one Urdu and one Hindi. It has one Masjid and one Madrasa. In that madrasa, about 25 poor Muslim orphans live and study. There is a Kali mandir in the village and a Hanuman mandir in the bazaar.

The famous market of Dhobwal is Fancy Market where every usable thing is available. It is spreading very rapidly.

Approximately 300 families live in Dhobwal.

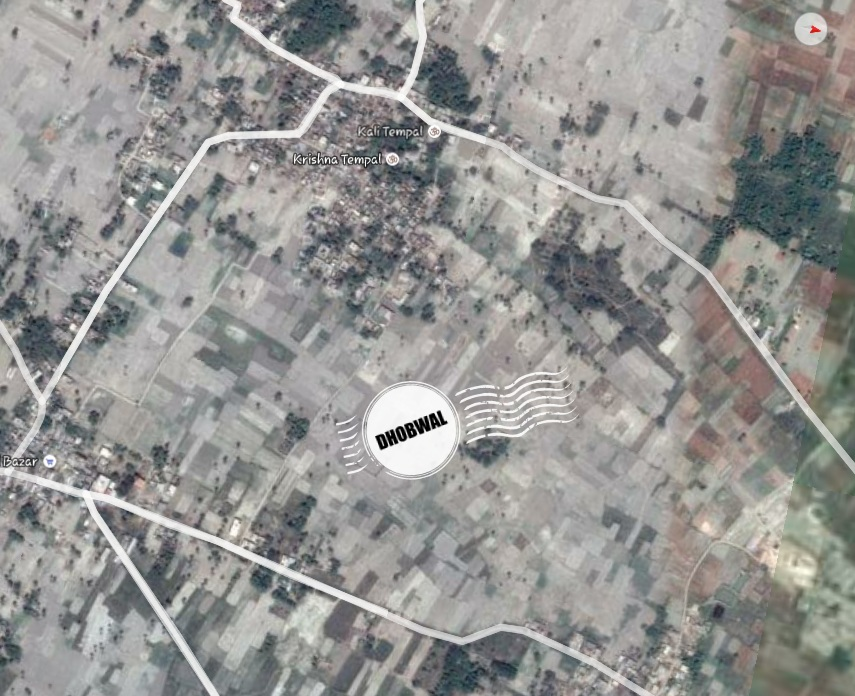
Dhobwal
