= NH 101 =

NH 101 may refer to:

- National Highway 101 (India)
- New Hampshire Route 101, United States
