= National Highway 227 (India) =

National highway in India

National Highway 227
- Map of National Highway 227 upto Chakia in red

Route information
- Auxiliary route of NH 27
- Length: 214 km (133 mi)

Major junctions
- From: NH 27 in Chakia
- List: NH 22 in Sitamarhi; NH28 in Shrikhandi Bhittha; NH 527C in Choraut; SH 75 in Basuki Chowk; NH 227J in Saharghat; NH 227L in Umgaon; NH 527B in Jainagar
- To: NH 27 in Narahia

Location
- Country: India
- States: Bihar

Highway system
- Roads in India; Expressways; National; State; Asian
| ← NH 127E | → NH 227A |

National Highway 227 (NH 227) is an auxiliary National Highway in India, located entirely within the state of Bihar.

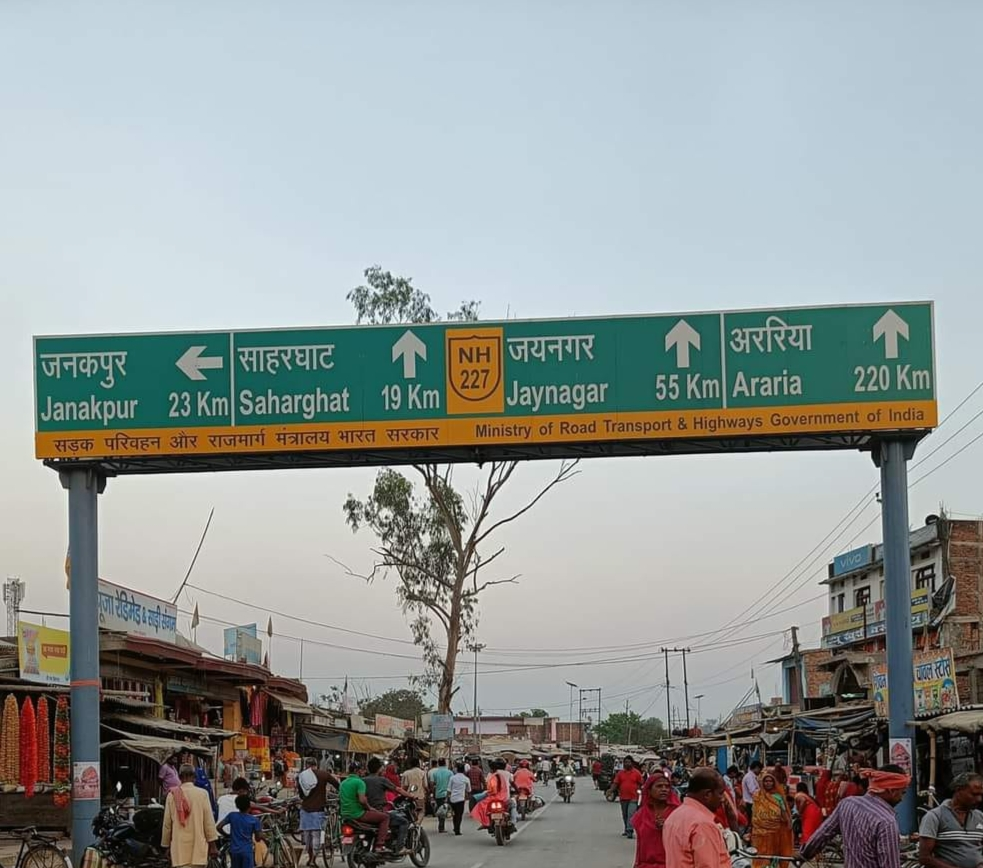
NH 227 signage board at Bhitthamore Border

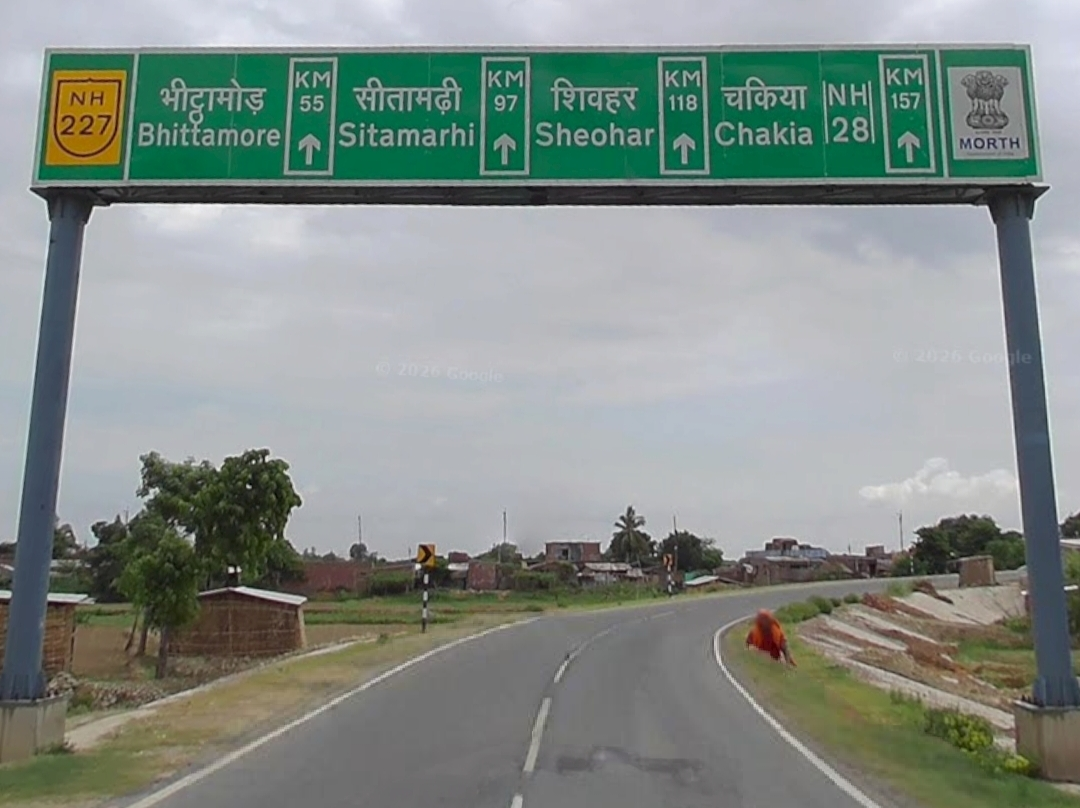
nh227 signage board at Jainagar

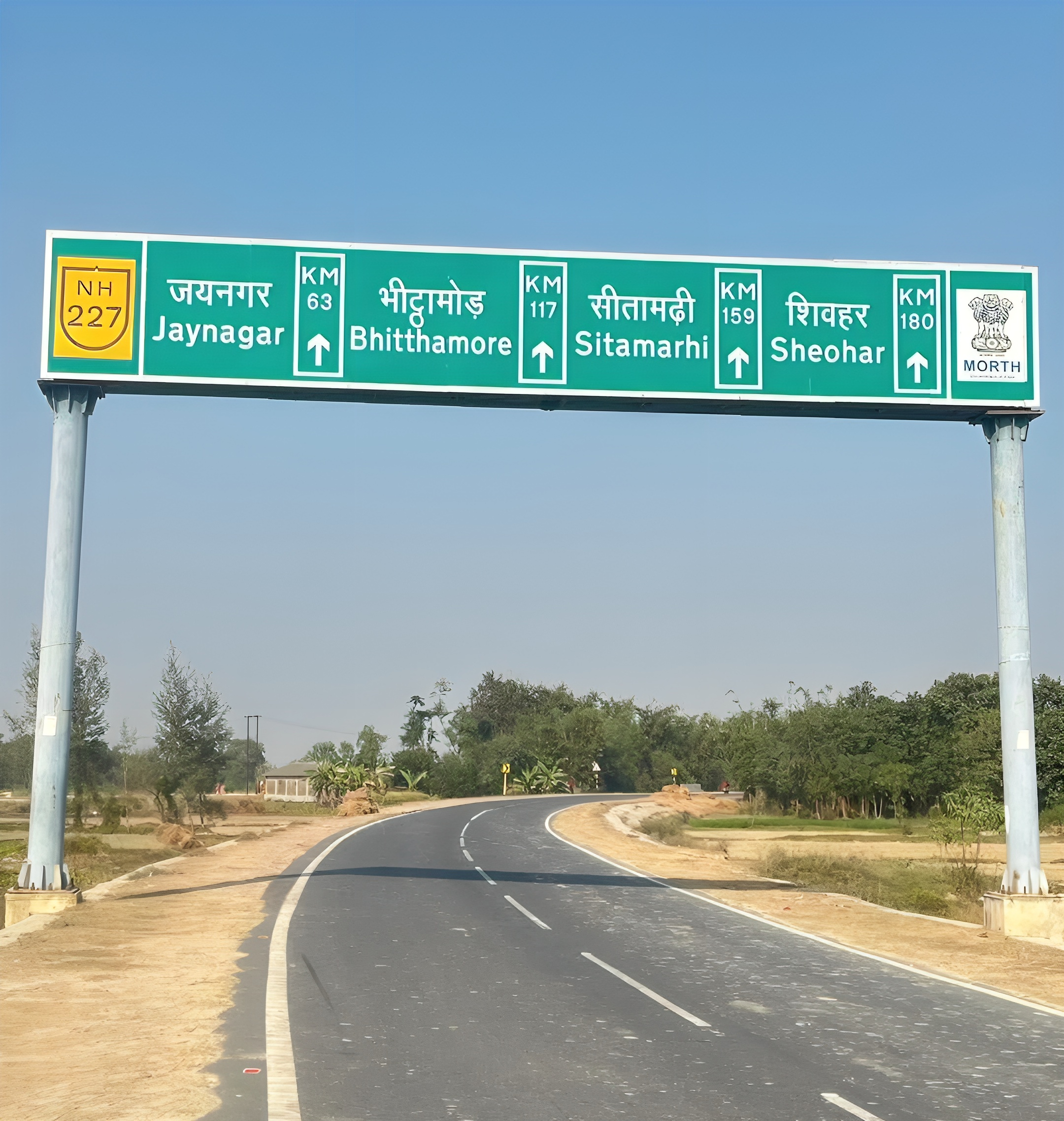
NH 227 signage board by the Ministry of Road Transport and Highways

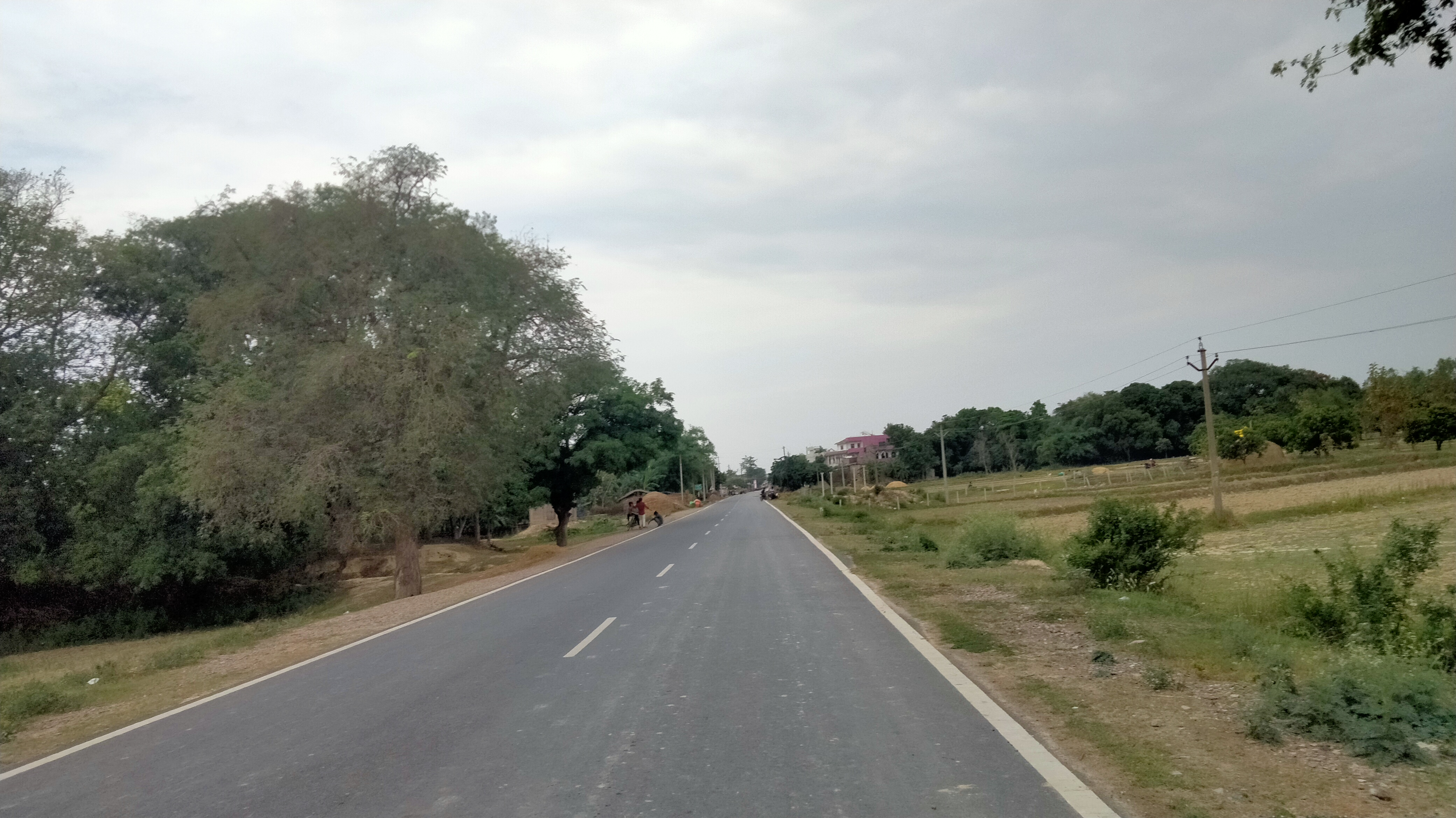
View of the NH 227 at the entry of Basuki Bihari South village.

== Route ==
Chakia is situated on NH 227, which provides road connectivity to major cities in Bihar and other parts of India. NH 227 also links up with Nepal's NH28 in Shrikhandi Bhittha.
