= National Highway 22 (India) =

National highway in India

National Highway 22
- Map of the National Highway in red
- Schematic map of National Highways in India

Route information
- Part of AH42
- Length: 450 km (280 mi)

Major junctions
- North end: NH32 in Sonbarsa, Bihar
- List: NH 227 in Sitamarhi, Bihar; NH 122A in Runni Saidpur, Bihar; NH 27 / NH 122 / NH 527C / NH 722 in Muzaffarpur, Bihar; NH 31 / NH 322 in Muzaffarpur, Bihar; NH 139 in Patna, Bihar; NH 33 in Jehanabad, Bihar; NH 120 in Gaya, Bihar; NH 19 in Dobhi, Bihar; NH 522 in Chatra, Jharkhand
- South end: NH 39 in Chandwa, Jharkhand

Location
- Country: India
- States: Bihar, Jharkhand

Highway system
- Roads in India; Expressways; National; State; Asian
← NH 21	→ NH 23

National Highway 22 (NH 22) is a National Highway in India. This highway runs from Sonbarsa (Sitamarhi district) in Bihar to Chandwa in Jharkhand. Sonbarsa is situated on India/ Nepal border.

== History ==
In August 2026, the Union cabinet approved the 4-lane road project worth 3,590 crore rupees connecting Muzaffarpur to Nepal border town of Sonabarsa as part of NH22.

== Route ==
NH-22 passes through following cities in Bihar and Jharkhand from north to south direction:

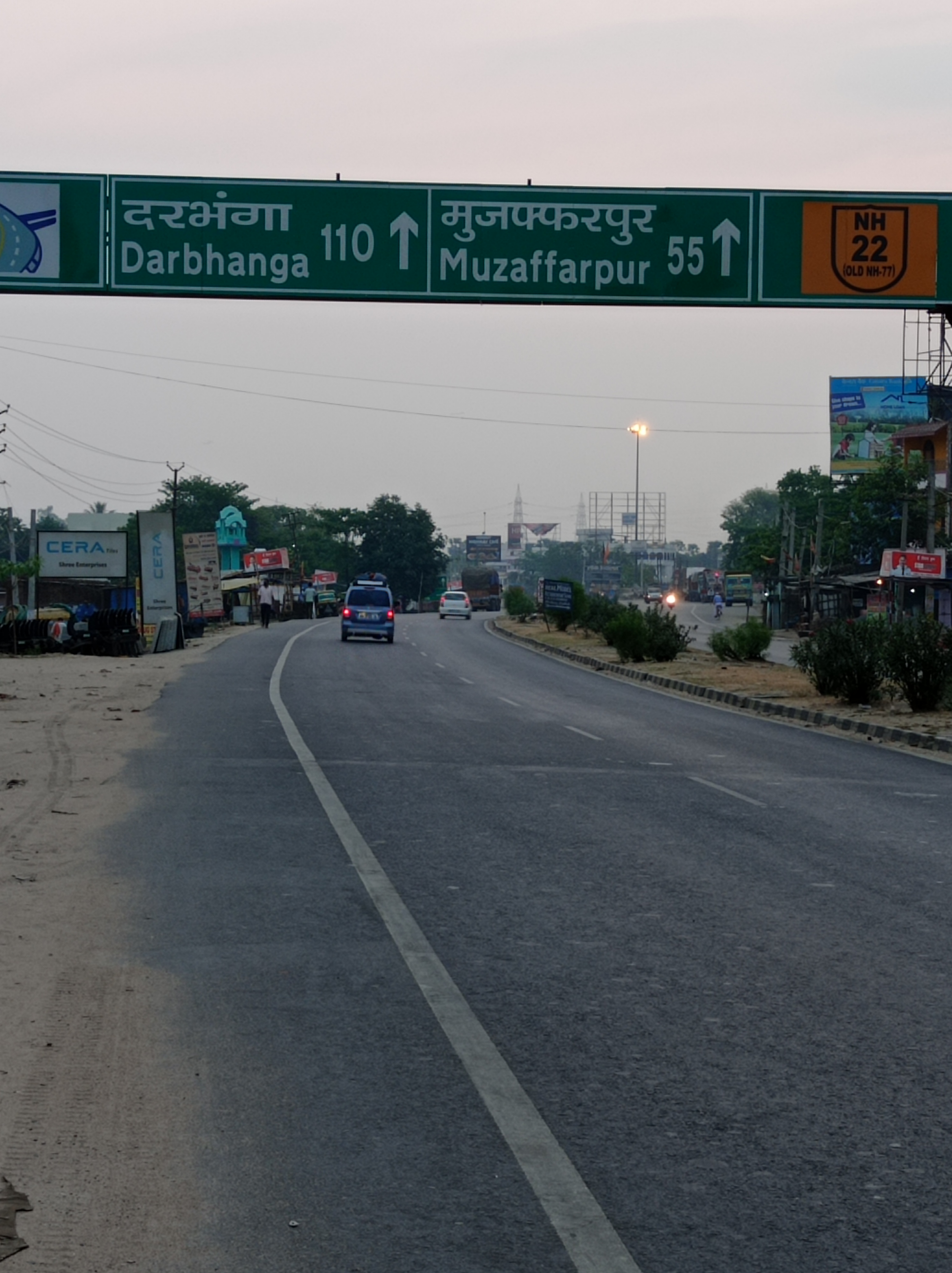
NH-22 at Hajipur-Muzaffarpur route.

=== Bihar ===
- Sonbarsa (Indo-Nepal border)
- Dumra (Sitamarhi)
- Runni Saidpur
- Bairia, Muzaffarpur
- Goraul (Vaishali)
- Bhagwanpur
- Dighikala, Hajipur
- Kumhrar, Patna (connecting NH-31)
- Punpun
- Masaurhi (Patna)
- Jehanabad (connecting NH-33)
- Belaganj
- Gaya
- Bodh Gaya
- Dobhi (connecting GT Road/NH-19)

=== Jharkhand ===
- Hunterganj
- Jori Kalan
- Chatra
- Balumath
- Chandwa (Latehar) (connecting NH-39)

== See also ==
- List of national highways in India
- List of national highways in India by state
