= National Highway 427 (India) =

National highway in India

National Highway 427
- Map of National Highway 427 in red

Route information
- Length: 85 km (53 mi)

Major junctions
- West end: Howly
- NH 27 near Howly
- East end: Jalukbari

Location
- Country: India
- States: Assam
- Primary destinations: Howly – Barpeta – Hajo – Jalukbari

Highway system
- Roads in India; Expressways; National; State; Asian
← NH 27	→ NH 27

National Highway 427 (NH 427) is an east–west national highway in India that starts from Howly and terminates in Jalukbari. The highway passes through the north bank districts of Western Assam. NH-427 was laid and is maintained by Central Public Works Department (CPWD).
