= National Highway 327C (India) =

National Highway in India

National Highway 327C
- Map of National Highway 327C in red

Route information
- Auxiliary route of NH 27
- Length: 11 km (6.8 mi)

Major junctions
- West end: Khoribari
- East end: Ghoshpukur

Location
- Country: India
- States: West Bengal

Highway system
- Roads in India; Expressways; National; State; Asian
← NH 327	→ NH 27

National Highway 327C, commonly referred to as NH 327C is a national highway in India. It is a secondary route of National Highway 27. NH-327C runs in the state of West Bengal in India.

== Route ==
NH327C connects Khoribari and Ghoshpukur in the state of West Bengal.

== Junctions ==
NH 327 Terminal near Khoribari.
NH 27 Terminal near Ghoshpukur.

== See also ==
- List of national highways in India
- List of national highways in India by state
