= National Highway 127D (India) =

National highway in India

National Highway 127D
- Map of the National Highway in red

Route information
- Length: 49 km (30 mi)

Major junctions
- South end: Rangiya
- North end: Darrangamela

Location
- Country: India
- States: Assam

Highway system
- Roads in India; Expressways; National; State; Asian
← NH 27	→ NH 27

National Highway 127D, commonly called NH 127D is a national highway in India. It is a spur road of National Highway 27. NH-127D traverses the state of Assam in India. This highway is located in Kamrup district of Assam.

== Route ==
Rangia - Indo/Bhutan border near Samdrup Junjkhar in Bhutan.

== Junctions ==
NH 27 Terminal near Rangia.

== See also ==
- List of national highways in India
- List of national highways in India by state
