= National Highway 122A (India) =

National highway in India

National Highway 122A
- Map of National Highway 122A in red

Major junctions
- West end: Pupri
- East end: Mehsi

Location
- Country: India
- States: Bihar

Highway system
- Roads in India; Expressways; National; State; Asian
← NH 22	→ NH 527C

National Highway 122A (NH 122A) is a national highway in the Indian state of Bihar. It begins near Pupri and terminates at Mehsi, where it meets National Highway 27. The highway forms an important east–west road corridor across northern Bihar, connecting Pupari the surrounding region with Mehsi and the East–West Corridor (NH 27). NH 122A is a spur of National Highway 22.

== Route ==
Pupri, Runni Saidpur, Taryani, Tetaria, Mehsi.

== Junctions ==
- NH 27 Terminal near Mehsi.
- NH 527C Terminal near Pupri.

== See also ==
- List of national highways in India
- List of national highways in India by state
