= National Highway 627 (India) =

National highway in India

National Highway 627
- Map of the National Highway in red

Route information
- Length: 244 km (152 mi)

Major junctions
- North end: Nelle
- South end: Harangajao

Location
- Country: India
- States: Assam

Highway system
- Roads in India; Expressways; National; State; Asian
← NH 27	→ NH 27

National Highway 627, commonly referred to as NH 627 is a national highway in India. It is a spur road of National Highway 27. NH-627 traverses the state of Assam in India.

== Route ==
Nelle (Amsoi Gate), Rajagaon, Diyungbra, Umrangso, Khobak, Harangajao.

== Junctions ==
NH 27 Terminal near Nelle.
NH 27 Terminal near Harangajao.

== See also ==
- List of national highways in India
- List of national highways in India by state
