= Mechi Bridge =

Bridge connecting India and Nepal

Mechi Bridge मेची पुल
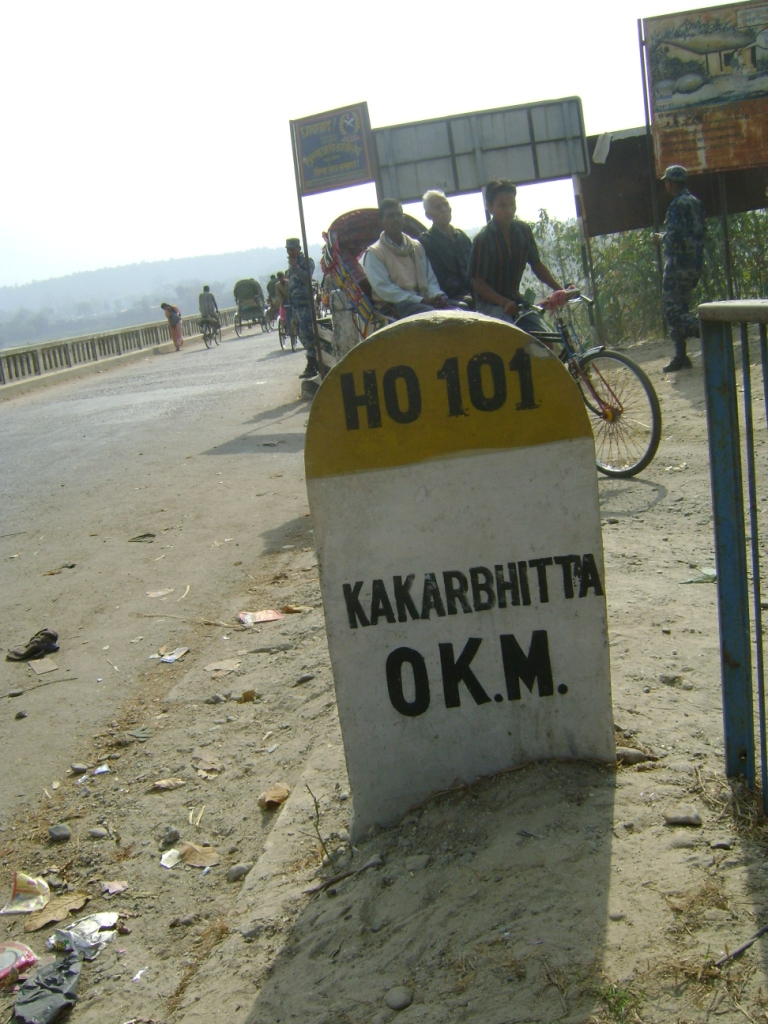
- Start of Mechi bridge in Nepal side
- Coordinates: 26°48′41.3″N 88°09′44.1″E
- Crosses: Mechi River
- Locale: Mechinagar Municipality, Jhapa District Nepal
- Official name: Bridge01/H01 Mechi Bridge
- Maintained by: National Highways and Infrastructure Development Corporation Limited (NHIDCL)

Characteristics
- Total length: 583 m (1,913 ft)
- Longest span: 20 m (66 ft)

History
- Constructed by: Dineshchandra R. Agrawal Infracon (DRA Infracon)

The Mechi Bridge (Nepali: मेची पुल) is a bridge that connects Nepal from the Jhapa District to the Darjeeling district in West Bengal, India. Built over Mechi River, this bridge is considered an Eastern Trade point between Nepal and India. It was inaugurated in January 2019.

== Location ==
Connecting Kakarbhitta Town and Panitanki Bazaar, this bridge is located at Jhapa District of Koshi Province, Nepal and Darjeeling district of West Bengal, India. It is around 20 kilometres (12 mi) east of the trade city Birtamod and around 110 kilometres (68 mi) kilometers from the capital of Province No. 1, Biratnagar. It is around 26 kilometres (16 mi) from Siliguri Town of West Bengal.

== Construction ==
The Mechi Bridge was constructed by India's National Highways and Infrastructure Development Corporation Limited (NHIDCL) and the EPC contractor was Dineshchandra R. Agrawal Infracon Private Limited (DRA Infracon).

== Connection with highways ==
The Mechi Bridge connects National Highway 327B and Mahendra Highway, which are also part of Asian Highway (AH2).

== See also ==
- Mahakali Bridge
- Karnali Bridge
- Narayani Bridge
- Sankhamul Bridge
- Sino-Nepal Friendship Bridge
