= Rewaghat =

- Village
- Country: India
- State: Bihar
- District: Muzaffarpur

Languages
  - Official: Bhojpuri, Hindi
- Time zone: UTC+5:30 (IST)
- ISO 3166 code: IN-BR

Rewaghat is a village in Muzaffarpur district, Bihar, India.

== Location ==
National Highway 722 passes through Rewaghat. It is the last village on Muzaffarpur side while crossing the Gandak river bridge on NH 722 towards Chhapra. A huge rush of people is there on Rewaghat during the annual fair " Rewa Mela" held around Kartik Purnima when People from even far off villages come to bathe in Gandak river and buy Household utensils, furniture and toys in the fair. Naulakha temple is near the ghat. Rewaghat is also an important Cremation ground in the region. Like much of North Bihar, it is often affected by flooding of the Gandaki River.
