= Sita Kund, Motihari =

Sacred pond related to Sita in Motihari

Sita Kund
- सीता कुंड

Religion
- Affiliation: Hinduism; Places in the Ramayana
- District: East Champaran
- Region: Mithila
- Deity: Goddess Sita
- Festivals: Ram Navami, Sita Navami
- Ecclesiastical or organizational status: Hindu Teerth
- Patron: Government of Bihar

Location
- Location: Bedivan Madhuban Panchayat, Chakiya block, Motihari
- State: Bihar
- Country: India
- Interactive map of Sita Kund
- Coordinates: 26.5145506°N 84.9860146°E

Architecture
- Founder: King Janaka
- Established: Treta Yuga
- Groundbreaking: An ancient Shivalinga excavated from underground on 2 December 2025
- Designated as NHL: Ramayana circuit

Sita Kund (Maithili: सीता कुंड) in Motihari is a legendary sacred pond related to the Indian epic Ramayana. According to legend, it is believed that during the Treta Yuga, Lord Rama's wedding procession (Ram Baraat) stopped at this place in Motihari and took rest for a night. It is located at outskirts of Motihari town at Vedivan (Bedivan) Madhuban Panchayat in the Chakiya block of the East Champaran district in the Mithila region of the Indian subcontinent. In the ancient times, the village was in the Videha Kingdom ruled by King Janaka. It is believed that the princess Sita of Mithila took her bath in this pond during her stay at this village.

== Description ==
The Sita Kund is also known for organizing a grand religious fair. Every year a large religious fair is organised in the campus of the kund on the occasion of Ramnavami. It is a circular pond having diameter 140 feet. It is situated near the middle of an unnamed old fort.

The legendary place of the Sita Kund has been recognised as a Hindu tourist destination by the Government of Bihar. The government has recently approved a budget of fund Rs 13 crore and 10 Lakh for the development, renovation and beautification of the legendary site for tourism.

== Excavation of an ancient Shivalinga ==
On 2 December 2025, an ancient Shivalinga was found during the excavation for the ongoing reconstruction of the site at the Sita Kund Dham.

After the excavation of the ancient Shivalinga from the ground of the Sita Kund, a large number of devotees flocked there at the site. They took darshan and worshiped the excavated ancient Shivalinga. It was kept at the premises of the Sita Kund Dham.
