= Bansen =

- Village
- Location in Rajasthan, India
- Coordinates: 24.7327°N 74.4497°E
- Country: India
- State: Rajasthan
- District: Chittorgarh
- Established: 650 A.D.

Government
  - Body: Gram panchayat
  - Sarpanch: Bhagvanti devi nahar

Area
  - Total: 5 km^{2} (1.9 sq mi)
- Elevation: 394.6 m (1,295 ft)

Population (2011)
  - Total: 5,315
  - Density: 1,100/km^{2} (2,800/sq mi)

Languages
  - Official: Hindi, English, Mewari
- Time zone: UTC+5:30 (IST)
- PIN: 312024
- Area code(s): +91-01470-XXXXXX
- Vehicle registration: RJ-09

Bansen is a small village situated in the Chittorgarh district of Rajasthan, India. It is situated on national highway 76 and has a population of around 5000, mostly farmers. The village is settled near by NH 76 so it is linked with all the country. The most transport vehicles from here are roadway busses and private vehicles.bansen village a big market area either its nearly villages its contant a big market share of around 30 to 35 villages.

Bansen has its own public market where all daily things can be found. Many hotels are near the village. Most of the residents depend on agriculture.
