= AH42 =

Road in Asia

Asian Highway 42

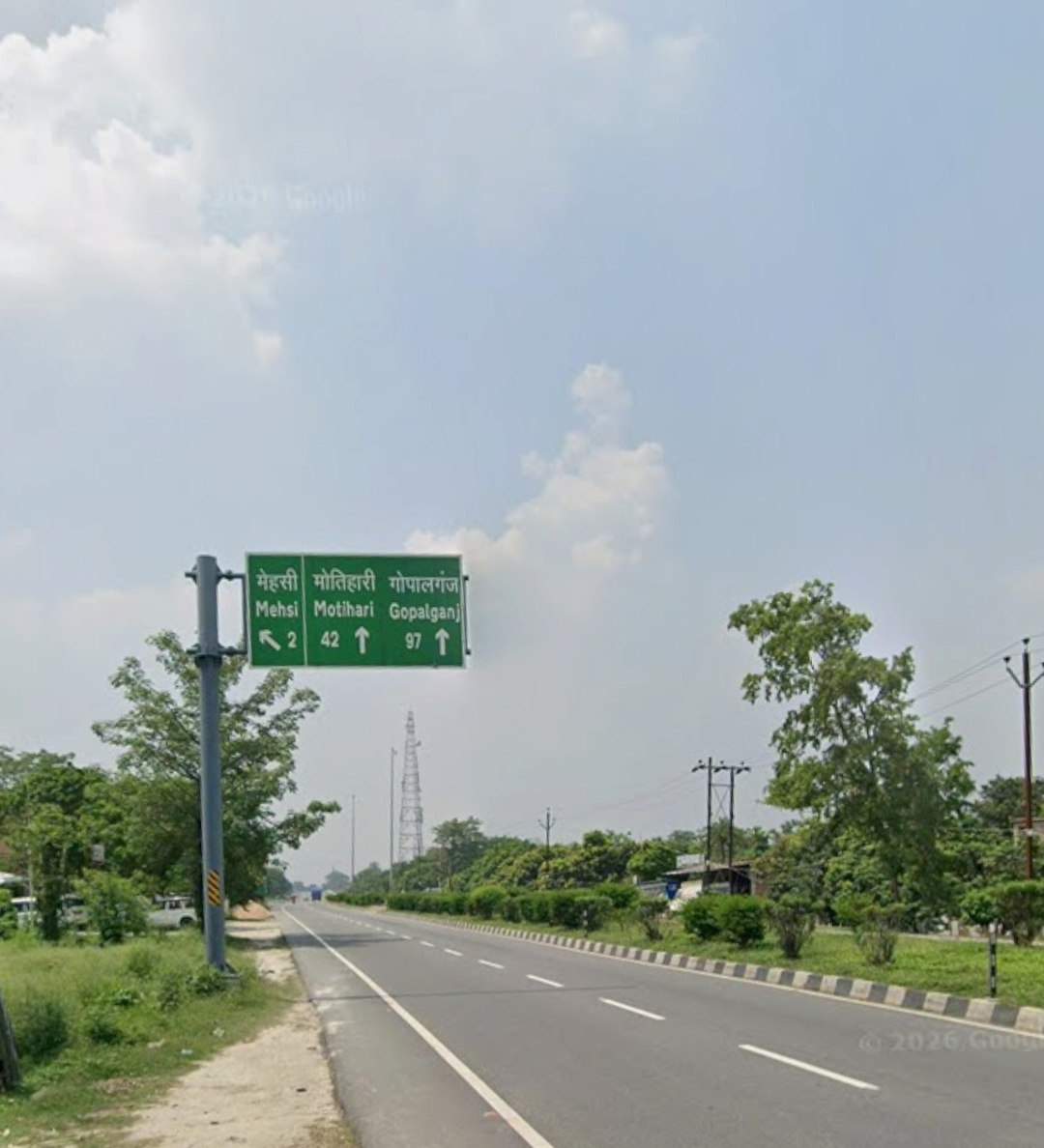
- Asian Highway 42 (NH 27) near Mehsi, East Champaran, Bihar, India

Route information
- Length: 3,754 km (2,333 mi)

Major junctions
- North end: Lanzhou, China
- Bakhari, Mehsi, Bihar, India
- South end: Barhi, India

Location
- Countries: China, Nepal, India

Highway system
- Asian Highway Network
← AH41	→ AH43

Asian Highway 42 (AH42) is a route of the Asian Highway Network, running 3,754 kilometres (2,333 mi) from AH5 in Lanzhou, China to AH1 in Barhi, India.

The route passes through China, Nepal, and India. It is the nearest Asian Highway to Mount Everest.

More than half of the route, from Lhasa to Lanzhou in China, is labelled as a "Potential Asian Highway."

== China ==
It passes through the following cities in China

- G6: Lanzhou - Xining - Golmud - Lhasa (when complete)
  - At the moment, Golmud - Nagqu uses G109.
- G318: Lhasa - Zhangmu

== Nepal ==
Map of AH42 in Nepal

- NH34 (Araniko Highway): Kodari - Kathmandu
- NH41 (Tribhuvan Highway): Kathmandu - Narayangarh (AH2) - Pathlaiya (AH2) - Birgunj

== India ==
Map of AH42 in India

- NH 527D Raxaul - Motihari - pipra kothi, Mehsi
- NH 27 Pipra Kothi - Mehsi - Muzaffarpur
- NH 22 Muzaffarpur
- NH 122 Muzaffarpur - Barauni
- NH 31 Barauni - Barh - Bakhtiarpur
- NH 20 Bakhtiarpur - Bihar Sharif - Nawada - Barhi
