= National Highway 227B (India) =

National Highway in India

National Highway 227B
- 84-Kosi Parikrama Marg

Route information
- Length: 240 km (150 mi)

Major junctions
- From: Makhauda Dham, Basti
- To: Ayodhya

Location
- Country: India
- States: Uttar Pradesh

Highway system
- Roads in India; Expressways; National; State; Asian

National Highway 227B (NH 227B), also known as the 84-Kosi Parikrama Marg, is a newly declared national highway in the state of Uttar Pradesh, India. It roughly follows the traditional 84-kosi (about 240 km) circumambulation route around the sacred city of Ayodhya. The highway spans five districts – Ayodhya, Basti, Ambedkar Nagar, Barabanki, and Gonda – linking numerous temples and pilgrimage sites associated with Lord Rama.

== Route description ==
NH 227B forms a loop ("parikrama") around Ayodhya. The road starts near Makhauda Dham in Basti district and terminates in the city of Ayodhya. Major waypoints include Sarpur (Basti), Gosaiganj (Barabanki), Bikapur and Patranga (Ayodhya/Ambedkar Nagar), and Bahuwan (near the Ambedkar Nagar/Gonda boundary). Key junctions include a crossing of NH 27 (Lucknow–Varanasi highway) near Gosaiganj.

Location	District	Distance from Makhauda (km)	Notes
Makhauda Dham (start)	Basti	0.0	Temple/pilgrimage site (84-kosi start)
Sarpur	Basti	29.0	Rural town
Gosaiganj	Barabanki	47.9	Junction with NH 27
Bikapur	Ayodhya	73.3	Town on route to Ayodhya
Patranga	Ambedkar Nagar	140.96	-
Bahuwan Madar Majha	Ambedkar Nagar*	160.20	Near Ambedkar Nagar/Gonda border
Ayodhya (Ramkot area)	Ayodhya	~240	End of route

- Approximate district.

== Historical and cultural significance ==
The 84-kosi parikrama around Ayodhya is an ancient Hindu pilgrimage tradition associated with Lord Rama. Completing the full parikrama, which touches dozens of sacred sites (up to 148), is believed to have great religious merit. The Ayodhya development plan includes the "Sri Ram Avtaran Corridor" along this route, linking 21 major Rama-related temples and ghats.

== Infrastructure and construction ==
NH 227B is being built/upgraded mainly as a two-lane highway with wide paved shoulders. The project is divided into multiple construction packages:

- Package I: Jagarnathpur–Makhauda–Sarpur (~36 km)
- Package II: Sarpur–Gosaiganj (~18.88 km)
- Package III: Gosaiganj–Bikapur (~25.5 km)
- Package IV: Bikapur–Patranga (~67.66 km)

In December 2024, HG Infra secured a ₹899 crore contract to upgrade a 63.84 km portion between Bahuwan Madar Majha and Jagarnathpur. Pre-construction activities, including land acquisition and surveying, are underway.

== Government initiatives and funding ==
NH 227B was formally notified by the Ministry of Road Transport & Highways. A 2022 Gazette notification refers to the "improvement and up-gradation of newly declared NH-227B (84 Kosi Parikrama Marg)". Funding has been reported at around ₹4,200 crore, shared between NHAI and the Uttar Pradesh Public Works Department.

== Connectivity and transport importance ==
NH 227B improves connectivity in Purvanchal by linking five districts around Ayodhya. It connects existing highways, including NH 27 at Gosaiganj, providing a continuous road circuit for pilgrims and local travelers. It supports regional trade, tourism, and religious events, particularly linked to the new Ram Temple in Ayodhya.
