= Korha, Katihar =

Korha कोढ़ा
- Town
- Nickname: Gerabari गेराबाड़ी
- Location in Bihar, India
- Coordinates: 25.6210°N 87.3995°E
- Country: India
- State: Bihar
- District: Katihar
- Elevation: 24 m (79 ft)

Languages
  - Official: Hindi, Urdu
- Time zone: UTC+5:30 (IST)
- Postal code: 854108
- Lok Sabha constituency: Purnia
- Vidhan Sabha constituency: Korha

Korha कोढ़ा is a town and tehsil (sub-district) in the Katihar district, Bihar state, India. The name is sometimes spelled Kora.

According to the 2011 census, the Korha sub-district (census code 01143) 54527 households and 282813 inhabitants (including 61647 children aged 0–6), and a literacy rate of 50%.

The village of Korha proper (census code 224355) had 962 households and 4584 inhabitants (including 808 children aged 0–6), and its literacy rate was 69%.

== Geography ==
Korha has an average elevation of 24 metres (79 ft). It is located about 280 km west of Patna, and 22 km northwest of Katihar. It is also 15 km north of the Ganges River, just downstream of the mouth of the Kosi River, and 81 km south of the border with Nepal.

Korha is on NH 31, where it turns from east to north into the Barauni-Purnea Highway. The nearest commercial airport is in Darbhanga (153 km).

== History ==
The history of Korha is largely tied to that of the city of Katihar, including its inclusion in the state of Bihar when the Bengal Province was split into the states of Bihar, Bengal and Odisha.

The region around Korha was the main center of jute industry in Bihar which attracted workers from the Mithilanchal, Magadh, and Bhojpuri areas of Bihar, as well from Nepal and other regions, including many adivasis from Jharkhand.

In the partition of India, a majority of the Muslims who lived in the area chose to remain, while many Hindus who came from Pakistan and Bangladesh settled at Korha. The Government of India provided the Hindu immigrants with land plots now known as Colonies No.1 and No.2, where they mixed with Bengali Hindus who were already in Korha.

There are sizeable populations of Marwari and Sindhi in Korha, mostly engaged in trading.

== Economy ==
The major source of living is agriculture, including rice, jute, bananas, wheat, pulses, and makhana.

== Education ==
Schools in town include the Government High School, Korha, Katihar, Government inter college, Korha, Katihar and the Project Girls High School, Korha.

== Places of worship ==
Korha has two Hindu temples, dedicated to Hanuman and Kali, Durga Mandir.
