= Patna Monorail =

Proposed monorail system for the city of Patna

Overview
- Locale: Patna, Bihar
- Transit type: straddle-beam Monorail
- Number of lines: 4 (planned)
- Daily ridership: 32,000 (Estd.)

Operation
- Began operation: Government of Bihar preferred metro rail over mono rail
- Train length: 4 coaches

Technical
- System length: 32 kilometers (20 mi)
- Electrification: 750 V DC
- Average speed: 31 km/h (19 mph)
- Top speed: 80 km/h (50 mph)

Patna Monorail was a proposed monorail system for the city of Patna.

== Network ==
There were 4 lines proposed to be built. RITES, the consultancy arm of Indian Railways had begun soil inspection as well as ground survey for the monorail network.

- Patna Junction to Gandhi Maidan.
- Patna Junction to Patliputra Colony.
- Patna Junction to Lok Nayak Jayaprakash Airport.
- Patna Junction to Kankarbagh.

== Project detail ==
The total estimated cost of the project was ₹2000-2500 Crore. The total length of the proposed 4 monorail corridors in Patna would be 32 km and in the first phase route length between 20 km and 25 km was to be completed.

As of 2021 the project has not commenced.

== See also ==
- Patna metro
