= National Highway 752 (India) =

National highway in India

National Highway 752
- Map of National Highway 752 in red

Route information
- Length: 92 km (57 mi)

Major junctions
- From: Aklera
- To: Baran

Location
- Country: India
- Primary destinations: Atru

Highway system
- Roads in India; Expressways; National; State; Asian
← NH 52	→ NH 27

National Highway 752 (NH 752) is a National Highway in India.
