= National Highway 527A (India) =

National highway in India

National Highway 527A
- Map of National Highway 527A in red

Route information
- Auxiliary route of NH 27
- Length: 75.3 km (46.8 mi)

Major junctions
- West end: Pokhrauni Chowk
- East end: Parsarma

Location
- Country: India
- States: Bihar

Highway system
- Roads in India; Expressways; National; State; Asian
← NH 527B	→ NH 327

National Highway 527A, commonly referred to as NH 527A is a national highway in India. It is a spur road of National Highway 27. NH-527A traverses the state of Bihar in India.

== Route ==
NH527A connects Pokhrauni Chowk, Madhubani, Rampatti, Jhanjharpur, Samey Chowk, Awam, Laufa, Rahua-Sangram, Bheja, Bakaur and Parsarma in the state of Bihar.

== Tourist places adjacent to highway ==
Bideshwar Sthan
सिद्ध पीठ माँ चामुण्डा मंदिर, पचही, मधेपुर
Parasmaninath Mandir
Laxminath gosain sthal

== Junctions ==
NH 527B Terminal near Pokhrauni.
NH 27 near Jhanjharpur.
NH 327 Terminal near Parsarma.

== See also ==
- List of national highways in India
- List of national highways in India by state
