= National Highway 127E (India) =

National highway in India

National Highway 127E
- Map of the National Highway in red

Route information
- Length: 65 km (40 mi)

Major junctions
- South end: Barama
- North end: Subankhata

Location
- Country: India
- States: Assam

Highway system
- Roads in India; Expressways; National; State; Asian
← NH 27	→ NH 27

National Highway 127E, commonly called NH 127E is a national highway in India. It is a spur road of National Highway 27. NH-127E traverses the state of Assam in India.

== Route ==
Barama, Baska, Baganpara, Subankhata, Indo/Bhutan border near Chowki.

== Junctions ==
Barama- Barbari- Nikashi- Chaulkara (Sohabari)- Subankhata- Uttarkuchi

Terminal with National Highway 27 near Barama.

== See also ==
- List of national highways in India
- List of national highways in India by state
