= National Highway 722 (India) =

National highway in India, previously NH 102

National Highway 722
- Map of National Highway 722 in red

Route information
- Length: 74 km (46 mi)

Major junctions
- From: Muzaffarpur
- To: Chhapra

Location
- Country: India
- States: Bihar
- Primary destinations: Rewaghat

Highway system
- Roads in India; Expressways; National; State; Asian
← NH 22	→ NH 31

National Highway 722 (NH 722) is a National Highway in India. This highway runs entirely in the state of Bihar.
