= Baniapur =

Baniapur is a town in the Saran district of Bihar state, India.

In January and February, a big fair (mela) is held at Baniapur.

== Transport ==
National Highway 85 and National Highway 101 pass through Baniapur. The nearest airport is Patna Airport, and the nearest railway station is Ekma Railway Station. The nearest railway junction is Chhapra Junction, which is about 25 kilometres (16 mi) away from the town. It falls under Kanhauli Sangram panchayat and Maharajganj Loksabha seat.

== Economy ==
The people of Baniapur are solely dependent on small-scale businesses. Baniapur had an estimated distributed population of nearly 30,000 according to 2011 Census India.
