= Manian, Iran =

Manian مانيان
- cities
- Location within Iran
- Coordinates: 28°34′38″N 53°12′57″E
- Country: Iran
- Province: Fars
- County: Jahrom
- Bakhsh: Central
- Rural District: Jolgah

Population (2006)
  - Total: 663
- Time zone: UTC+3:30 (IRST)
  - Summer (DST): UTC+4:30 (IRDT)

Manian (Persian: مانيان, also Romanized as Mānīān, Māneyān, and Mānīyān) is a village in Jolgah Rural District, in the Central District of Jahrom County, Fars province, Iran. At the 2006 census, its population was 663, in 141 families.
