= Chandpur, Malda =

Village and gram panchayet in West Bengal, India

Chandpur
- Village & Gram Panchayet
- Location in West Bengal, India Chandpur (India)
- Coordinates: 25.371349°N 87.798996°E
- Country: India
- State: West Bengal
- District: Malda

Government
  - Prodhan: shibji
  - Member: Shish Mohammad

Population (2011)
  - Total: 5,060

Language
  - Local: Bengali
  - Official: Bengali

Food
  - Main: Fish Rice
- PIN Code: 732125
- Booth no: 48(A) and 48(B)
- Vidhan Sabha: Harischandrapur

Chandpur is a village and gram panchayat in Malda district, West Bengal, India. Chandpur's Gram panchayat is located in Chandpur. Most of the villagers are Muslim, but there are also Hindu people in the area. It contains Sadhu Baba temple which is well known in the area. Many residents work in Kolkata or Mumbai. Some have businesses or are involved in farming.

== Religion ==
The village contains four Juma Masjid (Mosque). One Islamic madrasah and few other Moktobs, Waktiya Masjid.

== Education ==
The village contains four moktobs and two modern Kinder Garden schools, Chandpur children's Academy and Adarsha Sishu Bikash Shiksa Niketan. There are also government primary schools. The village also contains a Tabliki Madrasah named Chandpur Chandipur Riyajul Ulm.

== Healthcare ==
The village has one Primary Health Center called Chandpur Primary Hospital.

== Farming ==
Most of the villagers of Chandipur are farmers. A Krishi sambai Samiti was established here for farming development.
