= National Highway 727A (India) =

National highway in India

National Highway 727A
- Map of the National Highway in red

Route information
- Length: 106 km (66 mi)

Major junctions
- North end: Gorakhpur
- South end: Mairwa

Location
- Country: India
- States: Bihar, Uttar Pradesh

Highway system
- Roads in India; Expressways; National; State; Asian
← NH 27	→ NH 227A

National Highway 727A, commonly referred to as NH 727A is a national highway in India. It is a spur road of National Highway 27. NH-727A traverses the states of Bihar and Uttar Pradesh in India.

== Route ==
Uttar Pradesh

Gorakhpur, Deoria, Salempur - Bihar border.

Bihar

U.P. border - Mairwa.

== Junctions ==
NH 27 Terminal near Gorakhpur.
NH 227A Terminal near Mairwa.

== See also ==
- List of national highways in India
- List of national highways in India by state
