= National Highway 527C (India) =

National highway in India

National Highway 527C
- Map of the National Highway in red

Major junctions
- South end: Mehsi
- North end: Pupari

Location
- Country: India
- States: Bihar
- Primary destinations: Mehsi – Minapur – Muzaffarpur – Aurai – Jajuar – Katra – Pupri

Highway system
- Roads in India; Expressways; National; State; Asian
← NH 27	→ NH 227

National Highway 527C (NH 527C) is a national highway in the Indian state of Bihar.

It starts at Mehsi, where it connects with National Highway 27, and runs northwards through Minapur, Muzaffarpur, Aurai, Jajuar, Katra and terminates at Pupari in Bihar.

It is a spur road of National Highway 27.

== Route ==
The highway passes through Mehsi, Minapur, Muzaffarpur, Majhauli, Katra, Jajuar, Pupri and Choraut.

- Asian Highway 42 – Concurrency at Mehsi.
- NH 27 – Terminal at Mehsi.
- NH 227 – Junction near Choraut.

== See also ==
- List of national highways in India
- List of national highways in India by state
