= National Highway 231 (India) =

National highway in India

National Highway 231
- Map of National Highway 231 in red

Route information
- Length: 196 km (122 mi)

Major junctions
- West End end: Maheshkhunt
- East End end: Kora

Location
- Country: India
- State: Bihar
- Districts: Saharsa; Madhepura; Purnia; Katihar; Khagaria
- Primary destinations: Maheshkhunt; Sonbarsa; Simri Bakhtiyarpur; Saharsa; Madhepura; Murliganj; Banmankhi; Purnia; Kora

Highway system
- Roads in India; Expressways; National; State; Asian; State Highways in Bihar
← NH 31	→ NH 31

National Highway 231 (NH 231) is a National Highway in India. It connects Maheshkhunt, Sonbarsa Raj, Simri Bakhtiyarpur, Saharsa, Madhepura, Purnia and Kora.

== Route ==
National highway 231 transits across one state of India in east – west direction. It is spur road of NH 31

=== Bihar ===
- Maheshkhunt
- Sonbarsa Raj
- Simri Bakhtiyarpur
- Bangaon
- Saharsa
- Madhepura
- Murliganj
- Banmankhi
- Purnea
- Kora

== Junction ==
NH 31 Terminal at Maheshkhunt.
NH 327 near Bangaon
NH 131 near Madhepura
NH 131A near Line Bazar, Purnea
NH 27 near Gulabbagh, Purnia
NH 31 Terminal at Kora.
