= Jajuara =

Yajuar Yajuāda
- Village
- Location in Bihar, India Yajuar (India)
- Coordinates: 26°18′17″N 85°40′7″E
- Country: India
- State: Bihar
- District: Muzaffarpur District
- Region: Mithila region
- Named after: Yajurveda

Area
  - Total: 18.76 km^{2} (7.24 sq mi)
- Elevation: 57 m (187 ft)

Population (2011)
  - Total: 25,875
  - Density: 1,379/km^{2} (3,572/sq mi)
- Demonym: Maithil

Languages
  - Official: Maithili, Hindi
- Time zone: UTC+5:30 (IST)
- PIN: 843360
- ISO 3166 code: IN-BR
- Nearest city: Darbhanga, Muzaffarpur, Sitamarhi
- Sex ratio: 1089 ♂ / 1000 ♀
- Lok Sabha constituency: Muzaffarpur
- Vidhan Sabha constituency: Aurai
- Seat of Yajurveda in Mithila

Jajuara (Romanised: Yajuāda) also written Jajuar and Yajuar, is the largest village in the Muzaffarpur district of Bihar in India, and the second-largest village in Bihar. It was a prominent centre for learning Sanskrit and Vedic studies in Mithila. It was an important seat of Yajurveda. In the ancient period, it was an educational centre for learning Yajurveda in the Mithila Kingdom of the Indian subcontinent.

== Etymology ==
The original name Yajuar comes from Yajur vedasaya agara yasya Yajuara, which means "Village of people who know Yajurveda one of the four Veda in Hinduism".

== Geography and climate ==
The Yajuar region is situated in the district of Muzaffarpur in Bihar, India. The village covers 1,876 hectares (18.76 km^{2}), the largest village in Katra block. It is 55 km (34 mi) from Muzaffarpur, and 51.2 km (31.8 mi) from Darbhanga. There is no easy way to reach its district Muzaffarpur during rainy season. In recent times, solar energy has become very popular, but nowadays it is electricity.

The climate is mainly dry and cool. In summer the temperature varies from 35 °C (95 °F) to 45 °C (113 °F). In winter it is typically 5 °C (41 °F) to 15 °C (59 °F). The elevation is 51m close to sea level. The soil is suited for agriculture, which is the main economic activity of the region.

== Administration ==
There are three panchayats in Yajuar, namely Yajuar East, Yajuar Middle and Yajuar West Village. Jajuar is part of Katra CD block. Its revenue village name is Jajuara. Now yajuar got its own Police Station in 2023

== Demographics ==
As of the 2011 Census of India the population of Jajuara was 25,875 making it the second most populated village in Bihar. The male to female ratio in the village was 1,089/1,000. The literacy rate in the city was about 60%, male literacy being 69% and female literacy being 50%.

=== Language ===
Since Yajuar is a part of Mithila, Maithili language is spoken by all of the population. Hindi is the second most common language and limited use of English language is seen.

== Culture ==
The culture is very traditional. All the major Indian festivals are celebrated here.

=== Religious places and festivals ===
There are many spiritual places in Yajuar. Badi pokhar where the God of the village Shri Dihbaad Baba's temple is situated under the Peepal tree. Several other temples are also situated on the bank of the Pokhar. Some of the other important religious places in the village are yajuar kali asthan where kali puja is celebrated on diwali Sarvnath Mahadev asthan near water tank, Bhagvati Sthan, Dev nagar (near Gudri Bazar Bhira), Dhelmara Gosai, and Chaupaaid Mahadev sthan, Hanuman Mandir in Panchobh Tola near the high school. Devi Shakti peeth "Chamunda Mata mandir" is situated in Katra (block office) which is 8 km (5.0 mi) from Yajuar.

Yajuar celebrates a variety of festivals such as Holi, Ganesh Chaturthi, Chaurchan, Kojagara, Durga Puja, Diwali and Kali Puja, and Bhaiya Dooj or better known as Bhardutiya among others. The Chhath Puja of Yajuar is very famous among all the nearby villages. In Durga Puja as well as Kali Puja, a group of people commonly known as the orchestra are invited by the committee members to entertain the people with their dancing and singing acts. Durga Puja is celebrated in the premises of the Bari Pokhar temple while Kali Puja is celebrated in Rajkiya Madhya Vidyalaya yajuar Anusuchit (Popularly known as Harijan school)

== Economy ==
Agriculture is the main economic activity of this village. The main crops are rice, wheat, pulses, moong, urad, arhar, jute (with a recent decline in its production), and maize.

Apart from these, yajuar also produces many fruits including mangoes. Although mango trees can be found in the whole village, there is a special place called Bhagwanpur toal where a variety of mango trees can be found. As estimated, there are more than 25,000 mango trees in Bhagwan pur toal.

The economy is not robust and the village is considered one of the poorest in India. Flooding destroys enormous amounts of crops every year. Due to the absence of industry, a weak educational infrastructure, and criminal politics, the majority of the area's youth have had to relocate for education and earnings.

There is only one Regional Rural Bank situated here near Gobind Chauk.

== Education ==
There are many private and government schools in village. There is one high school and many middle schools like Harijan school, Middle school etc. & one college Ram Janki inter Mahavidyalaya for higher education which is situated near badi pokhar. In private schools, Gaytree Vidya Mandir is most popular
