= National Highway 527D (India) =

National highway in India

National Highway 527D
- Map of National Highway 527D in red

Route information
- Part of AH42
- Length: 69 km (43 mi)

Major junctions
- South end: NH 27 in Piprakothi
- NH 727 in Chhapwa
- North end: NH41 in Raxaul

Location
- Country: India
- States: Bihar
- Primary destinations: Sagauli – Raxaul – Motihari

Highway system
- Roads in India; Expressways; National; State; Asian
| ← NH 27 | → NH 527D |

National Highway 527D (NH 527D) is a National Highway in India.

National Highway 527D was previously known as NH-28A. NH527D is the part of NH27 which is the second largest National Highway in India after NH44.

NH527D connects Nepal to major Indian sea ports as Kolkata and Haldiya Port for the import and export of good to and from various countries.

It starts from Piprakothi East Champaran, Bihar and ends at the India-Nepal border at Raxaul Town. It passes through Motihari (District Headquarter of East Champaran), Sugauli, Ramgarhwa and ends at the India-Nepal border connecting the Indian city of Raxaul to Nepal's bordering town Birgunj.

It intersects State Highway 54 at Chhatauni Chowk, Motihari. It is a two lane highway between Piprakothi to Raxaul having large crowd of vehicles struggling at intersections in cities.

The highway 527D Connects to its junction with NH-27 near where NH227 also connects to Chakia, connecting Narhar, Pakri Bridge, Madhuban, Shivhar, Sitamarhi, Harlakhi, Umgaon, Jaynagar, Laukaha, and Laukahi.

Chakia is the town where NH227A, coming from Ayodhya via Siwan, connects to NH27, NH527D, and NH227F.

NH227F starts from its junction with NH- 227 near Chakia (Chorma chowk) connecting Pakridayal, Dhaka, Phulwaria Ghat and terminating at Bairgania in the state of Bihar near the India-Nepal border.
