= Mohammadpur, Bihar =

Mohammadpur
- Town
- Location in Bihar, India Mohammadpur (India)
- Coordinates: 26.351928°N 84.699405°E
- Country: India
- State: Bihar
- District: Gopalganj

Languages
  - Official: Hindi
  - Regional: Bhojpuri
- Time zone: UTC+5:30 (IST)
- PIN: 841423

Mohammadpur is a town located in the Gopalganj district of the Indian state of Bihar. It comes under the administrative jurisdiction of Mohammadpur Police Station.

== Geography ==
Mohammadpur is situated in the northern part of Bihar and is part of the fertile Gangetic plains.

== Administration ==
The town is administered under Mohammadpur Police Station, which is part of Gopalganj district police jurisdiction.

== Mohammadpur Police Station ==
Mohammadpur Police Station serves the local area of Mohammadpur and nearby villages. It is responsible for maintaining law and order, crime investigation, and public safety in its jurisdiction under Gopalganj district police.

== Transport ==
The area is connected by road to nearby towns and district headquarters Gopalganj. The nearest major railway connectivity is available at nearby railway stations in the district.

== See also ==
- Gopalganj district
- Bihar Police
