= National Highway 431 (India) =

National highway in India

National Highway 431
- Map of National Highway 431 in red

Route information
- Length: 70 km (43 mi)

Major junctions
- From: Fatuha
- To: Barh

Location
- Country: India
- Primary destinations: Chandi - Harnaut

Highway system
- Roads in India; Expressways; National; State; Asian
← NH 331	→ NH 531

National Highway 431 (NH 431) is a National Highway in India.

It runs from Fatwah, south to Daniawan, South east to Nagar Nausa, then to Chandi, then East through Jaitipur More, North east to Narsanda then East to Harnaut, then Belchhi and then north to Barh
