= National Highway 727 (India) =

National highway in India

National Highway 727
- Map of National Highway 727 in red

Route information
- Auxiliary route of NH 27
- Length: 169 km (105 mi)

Major junctions
- West end: Kushinagar, Uttar Pradesh
- East end: Chhapwa, near Sugauli, Bihar

Location
- Country: India
- States: Bihar, Uttar Pradesh

Highway system
- Roads in India; Expressways; National; State; Asian
← NH 27	→ NH 527D

National Highway 727 (NH 727) is a national highway in India.
