= National Highway 331 (India) =

National highway in India

National Highway 331
- Map of National Highway 331 in red

Route information
- Length: 65 km (40 mi)

Major junctions
- From: Chhapra
- To: Mohammadpur

Location
- Country: India
- Primary destinations: Jalalpur, Baniapur, Sahajitpur, Bhagwanpur, Malmaliya

Highway system
- Roads in India; Expressways; National; State; Asian
| ← NH 231 | → NH 431 |

National Highway 331 (NH 331) is a National Highway in India.
