= Howly =

Howly Howly
- city
- Location in Assam, India Howly (India)
- Coordinates: 26.43°N 90.97°E
- Country: India
- State: Assam
- District: Barpeta

Government
  - Body: Howly Town municipality
- Elevation: 43 m (141 ft)

Population (2001)
  - Total: 15,958

Languages
  - Official: Assamese
- Time zone: UTC+5:30 (IST)
- Postal code: 781316
- Vehicle registration: AS 15
- Website: howlymb.in

Howly (IPA:ˈhaʊlɪ) is a town and a municipality in Barpeta district in the Indian state of Assam.

== Geography ==
Howli is located at 26.43°N 90.97°E. It has an average elevation of 43 metres (141 feet).

- Population: Around 18,300 (as per 2011 census)
- Literacy Rate: Exceptionally high at 97%, with male literacy at 99% and female literacy at 96%
- Divided into Howly and Ghilazari mouzas, with over 50 revenue villages like Joypur, Jashihati in the surrounding area

== Demographics ==
As of 2001 India census, Howly had a population of 15,958. Males constitute 52% of the population and females 48%. Howly has an average literacy rate of 97%, higher than the national average of 59.5%: male literacy is 99%, and female literacy is 96%. In Howly, 14% of the population is under 6 years of age.
