= National Highway 327A (India) =

National highway in India

National Highway 327A
- Map of the National Highway in red

Route information
- Length: 25 km (16 mi)

Major junctions
- South end: Supaul
- North end: Bhaptiahi

Location
- Country: India
- States: Bihar

Highway system
- Roads in India; Expressways; National; State; Asian
← NH 327	→ NH 27

National Highway 327A, commonly called NH 327A is a national highway in India. It is a spur road of National Highway 27. NH-327A traverses the state of Bihar in India.

== Route ==
Supaul - Bhaptiahi.

== Junctions ==
NH 327 Terminal near Supaul.
NH 27 Terminal near Bhaptiahi.

== See also ==
- List of national highways in India
- List of national highways in India by state
