= National Highway 227A (India) =

National highway in India

National Highway 227A

Route information
- Length: 329 km (204 mi)

Major junctions
- West end: Ayodhya
- East end: Chakia

Location
- Country: India
- States: Uttar Pradesh, Bihar

Highway system
- Roads in India; Expressways; National; State; Asian

National Highway 227A (NH 227A) is a national highway in India connecting Ayodhya in the state of Uttar Pradesh with Chakia in East Champaran district, Bihar. The highway terminates at Chakia, where it intersects with National Highway 27, serving as an important transport and connectivity point in northern Bihar.

It is a spur road of National Highway 27.

== Route ==
Ayodhya → Faizabad → Barhalganj → Barhaj → Bihar border → Siwan region → Mashrakh → Chakia

== Map (OpenStreetMap) ==
https://www.openstreetmap.org/relation/11648226

== Route ==
Ayodhya → Faizabad → Eastern Uttar Pradesh → Bihar border → Chakia

== Route ==
Uttar Pradesh

Ayodhya - Chhawni ( Ch 0.00) - Kalwari - Barhalganj - Barhaj - Bihar Border - 218 km.

Bihar

Uttar Pradesh Border - Siwan - Barauli - 111.3 km.

== Junctions ==
NH 27 Terminal near Ayodhya.
NH 27 Terminal near Chakia.

== See also ==
- List of national highways in India
- List of national highways in India by state

[4]
