= National Highway 531 (India) =

National highway in India

National Highway 531
- Map of National Highway 531 in red

Route information
- Length: 93 km (58 mi)

Major junctions
- From: Chhapra
- To: Gopalganj

Location
- Country: India
- States: Bihar
- Primary destinations: Siwan

Highway system
- Roads in India; Expressways; National; State; Asian
← NH 431	→ NH 731

National Highway 531 (NH 531) is a National Highway in India.
