= Chakia, Bihar =

Chakia Bara chakia
- Town
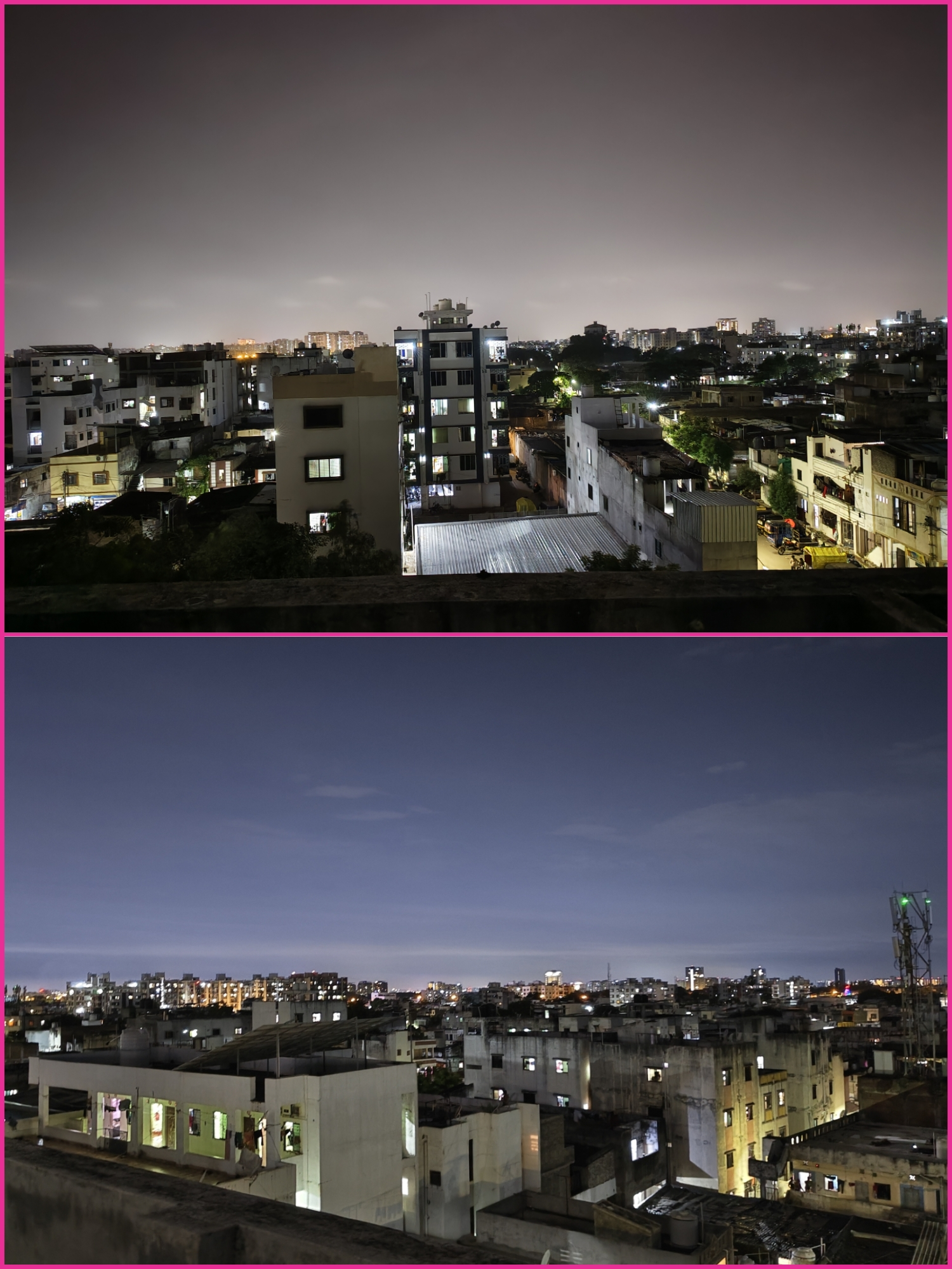
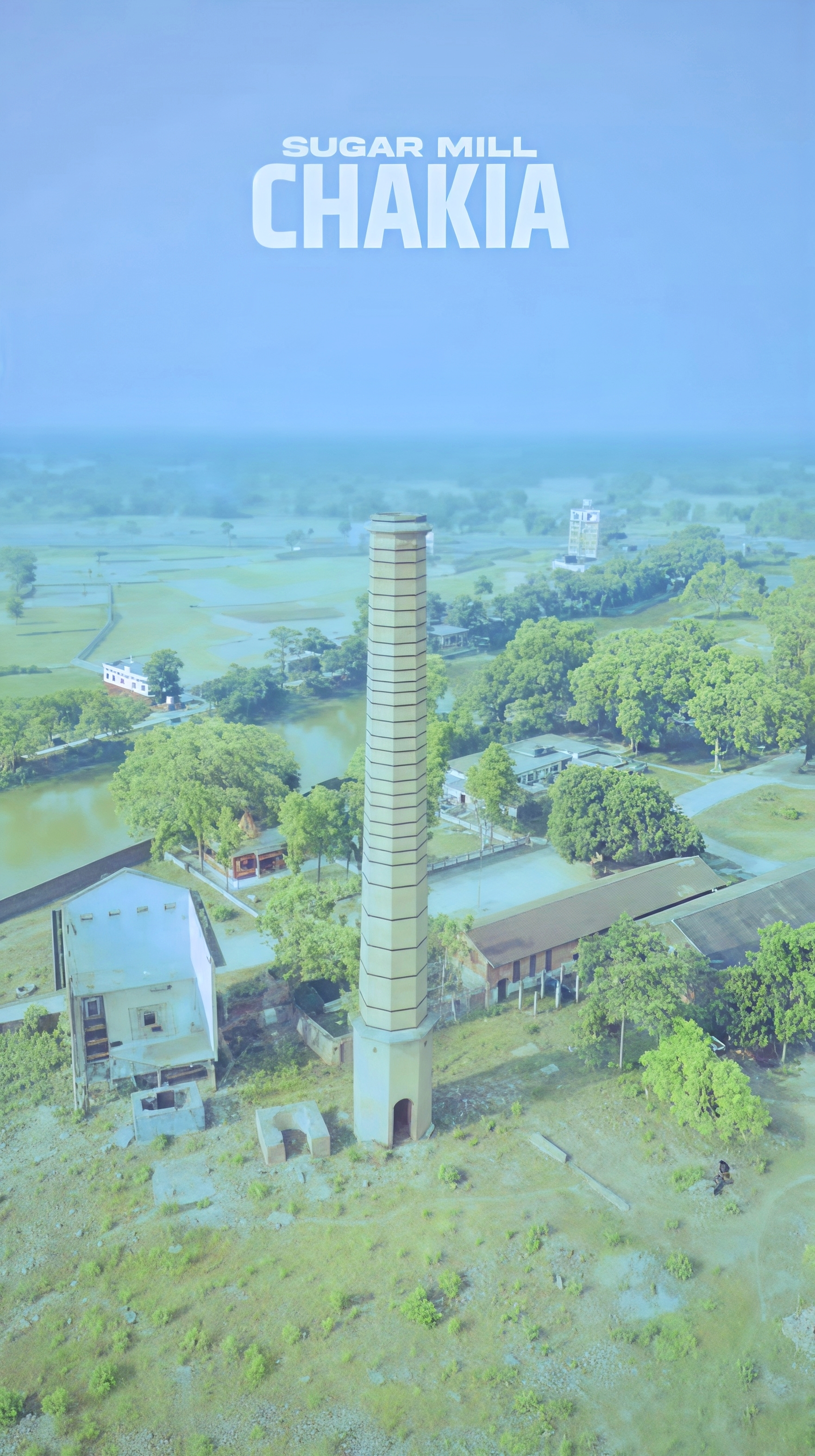
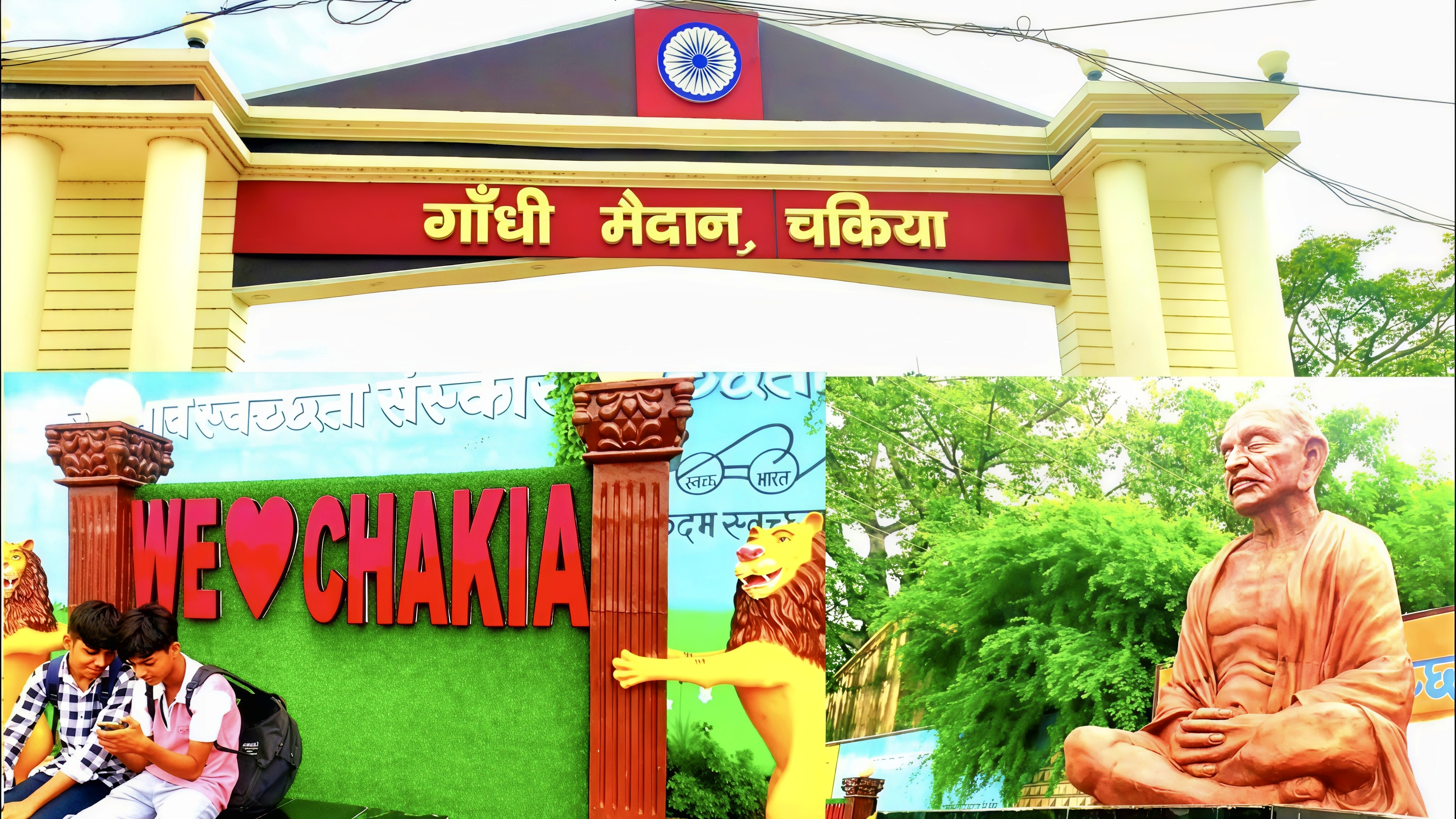
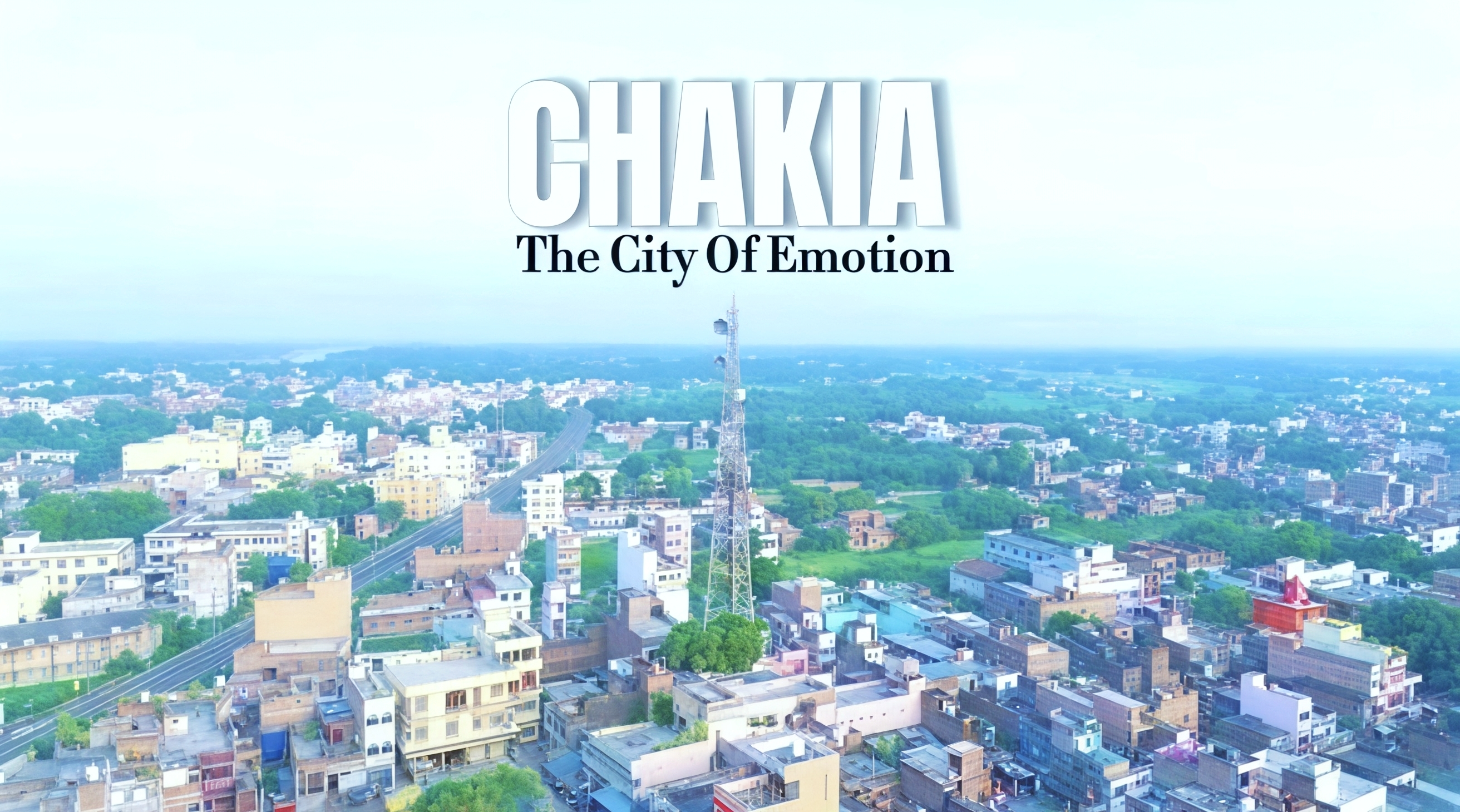
- chakia city night view sugar mill chakia Gandhi maidan chakia chakia drone view

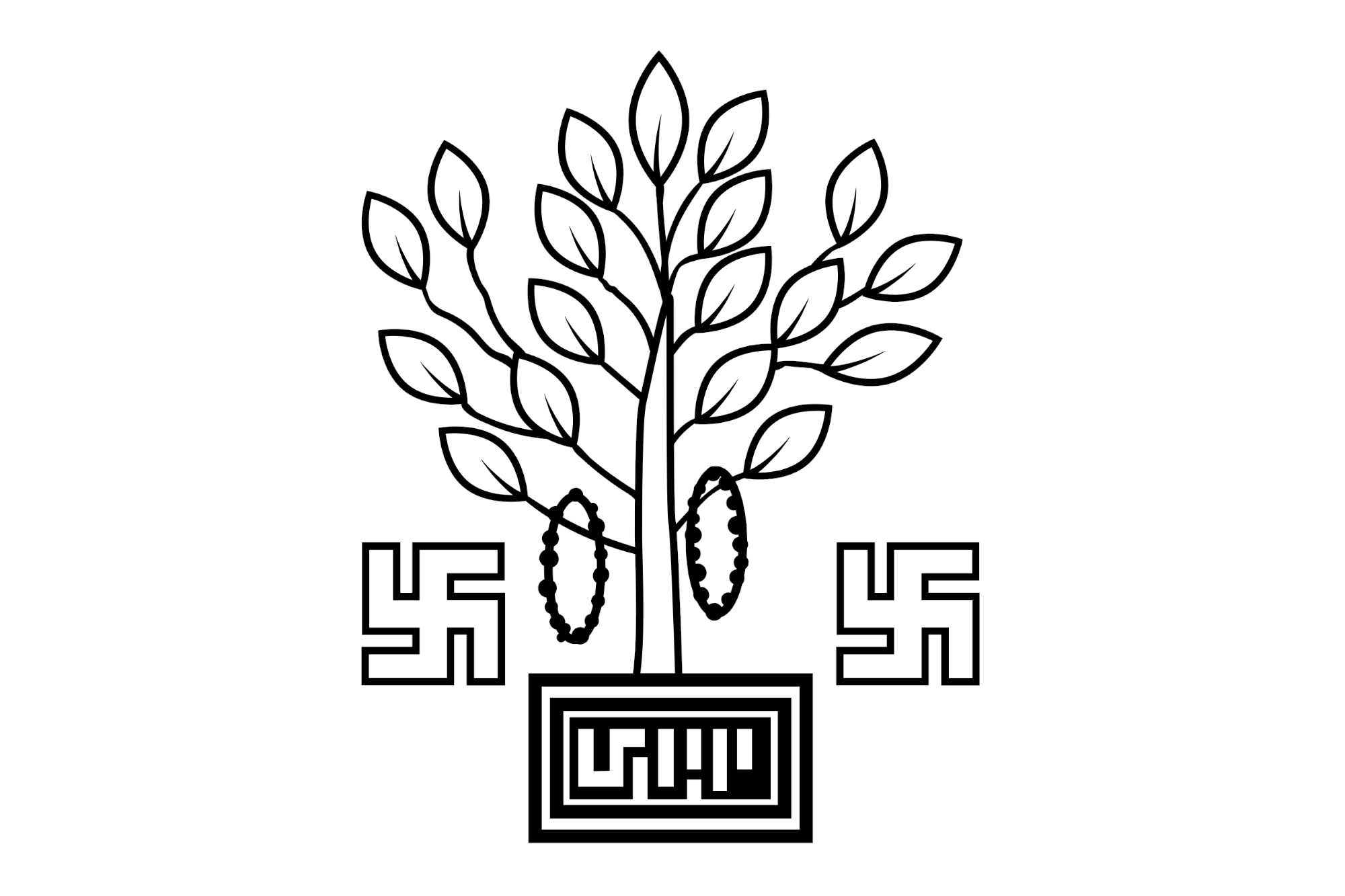
- Coat of arms
- Nickname: Chakia
- Location in East Champaran, Bihar, India
- Coordinates: 26.42°N 85.05°E
- Country: India
- State: Bihar
- District: East Champaran
- Ward(s): 25

Government
  - Type: Nagar Parishad
  - Body: Chakia Nagar Parishad
- Elevation: 52 m (171 ft)

Population (2011)
  - Total: 16,618
  - Rank: 4th
  - Density: 3,320/km^{2} (8,600/sq mi)
- Demonym: Chakiawasi

Languages
  - Official: Hindi, Urdu
  - Regional/Spoken: Bhojpuri
- Time zone: UTC+5:30 (IST)
- PIN: 845412
- Telephone code: 06257
- ISO 3166 code: IN-BR
- Vehicle registration: BR05
- Lok Sabha constituency: Purvi Champaran
- Vidhan Sabha constituency: Pipra
- Website: https://www.e-chakia.com/

Chakia is a town in East Champaran district in the Indian state of Bihar. It is located approximately 48 Kilometres northwest of Muzaffarpur. 32 kilometers southeast of Motihari.

== Religious ==
=== Sita Kund ===
Sita Kund (Maithili: सीता कुंड) in Chakia is a legendary sacred pond related to the Indian epic Ramayana. According to legend, it is believed that during the Treta Yuga, Lord Rama's wedding procession (Ram Baraat) stopped at this place in Motihari and took rest for a night. It is located at outskirts of Chakia town at Vedivan (Bedivan) Madhuban Panchayat in the Chakiya block of the East Champaran district in the Mithila region of the Indian subcontinent. In the ancient, the village was in the Videha Kingdom ruled by King Janaka. It is believed that the princess Sita of Mithila took her bath in this pond during her stay at this village.

=== Maa Kali Mandir ===
The Maa Kali Mandir is a historical temple dedicated to Goddess Kali in Chakia. It is located at the ward number 6 of the town. It was built 150 years ago by the then Maharaja Kashi Naresh. The temple also holds three Shivalingas of Lord Shiva in its sanctum sanctorum. There is a centuries-old tradition in the temple that the worship of Goddess Kali is conducted and guided by only Maithili Brahmins. The tradition is still alive and practiced.

== Transportation ==
Chakia town is served by road and rail transport. It is located on the Muzaffarpur–Motihari corridor.

- Ram Janki Marg
- NH-27
- NH-227
- NH-227A
- NH-227F

Chakia railway station is on the Muzaffarpur–Gorakhpur main line under the Samastipur railway division.

== Demographics ==
As of 2011 India census, Chakia had a population of 16,618. Males constitute 53% of the population and females 47%. Chakia has an average literacy rate of 51%, lower than the national average of 59.5%; with male literacy of 60% and female literacy of 40%. 20% of the population is under 6 years of age.

== Blocks ==
The Chakia Tehsil (subdivision) is divided into 4 Community development block: Chakia/Pipra, Mehsi, Kesariya, Kalyanpur
