= National Highway 327 (India) =

National highway in India

National Highway 327
- Map of National Highway 327 in red
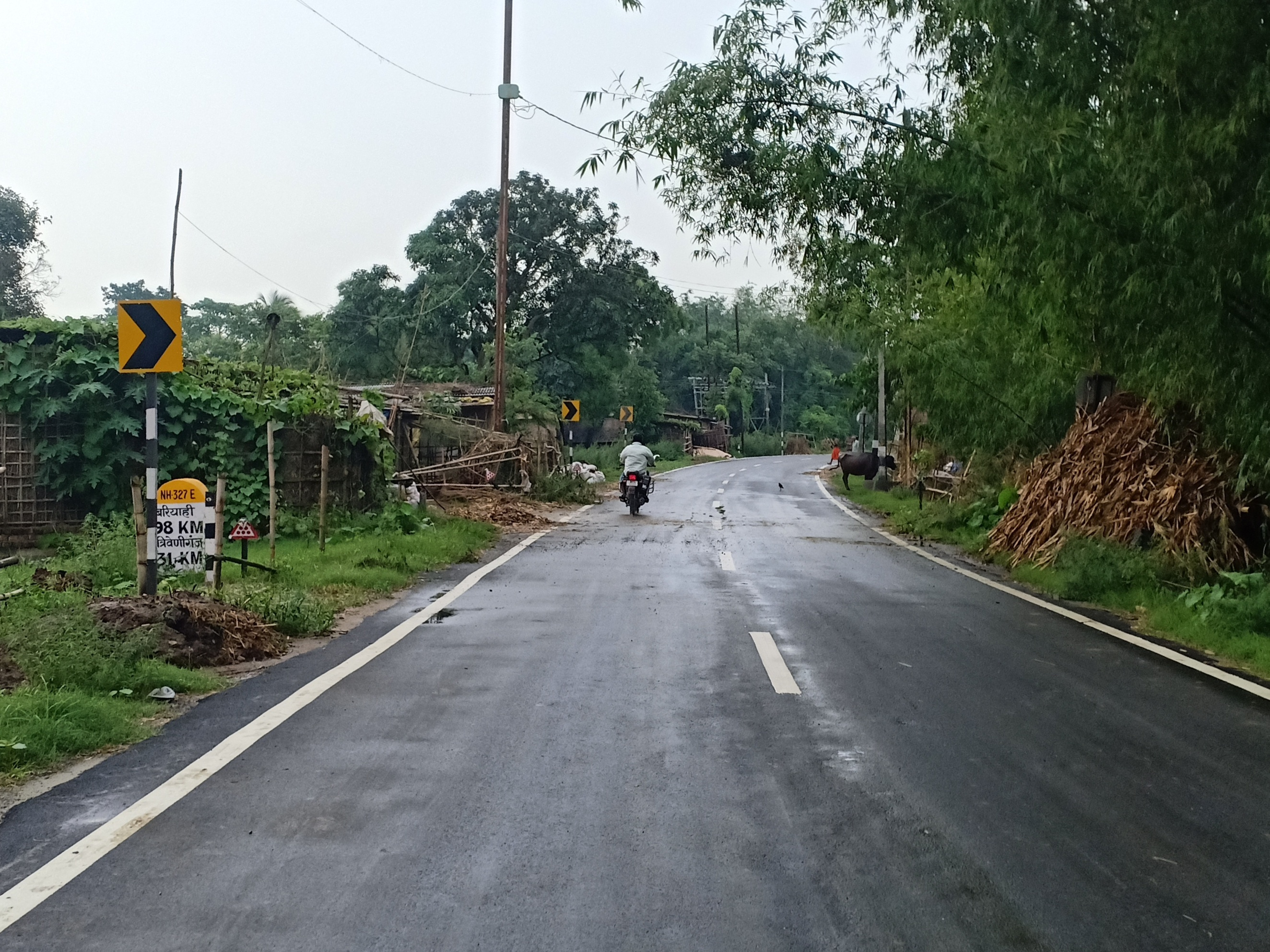

Route information
- Part of AH2
- Length: 32 km (20 mi)

Major junctions
- From: Bagdogra
- To: Bangaon

Location
- Country: India
- States: West Bengal
- Primary destinations: Naksal Bari

Highway system
- Roads in India; Expressways; National; State; Asian
← NH 27	→ NH 231

National Highway 327 (NH 327) is a National Highway in India. It is a spur road of National Highway 27. NH327 route was extended from Galgalia in Bihar to Bangaon in Bihar.

== See also ==
- List of national highways in India
- List of national highways in India by state
