= Lakhiganj =

Village in Assam, India

- village
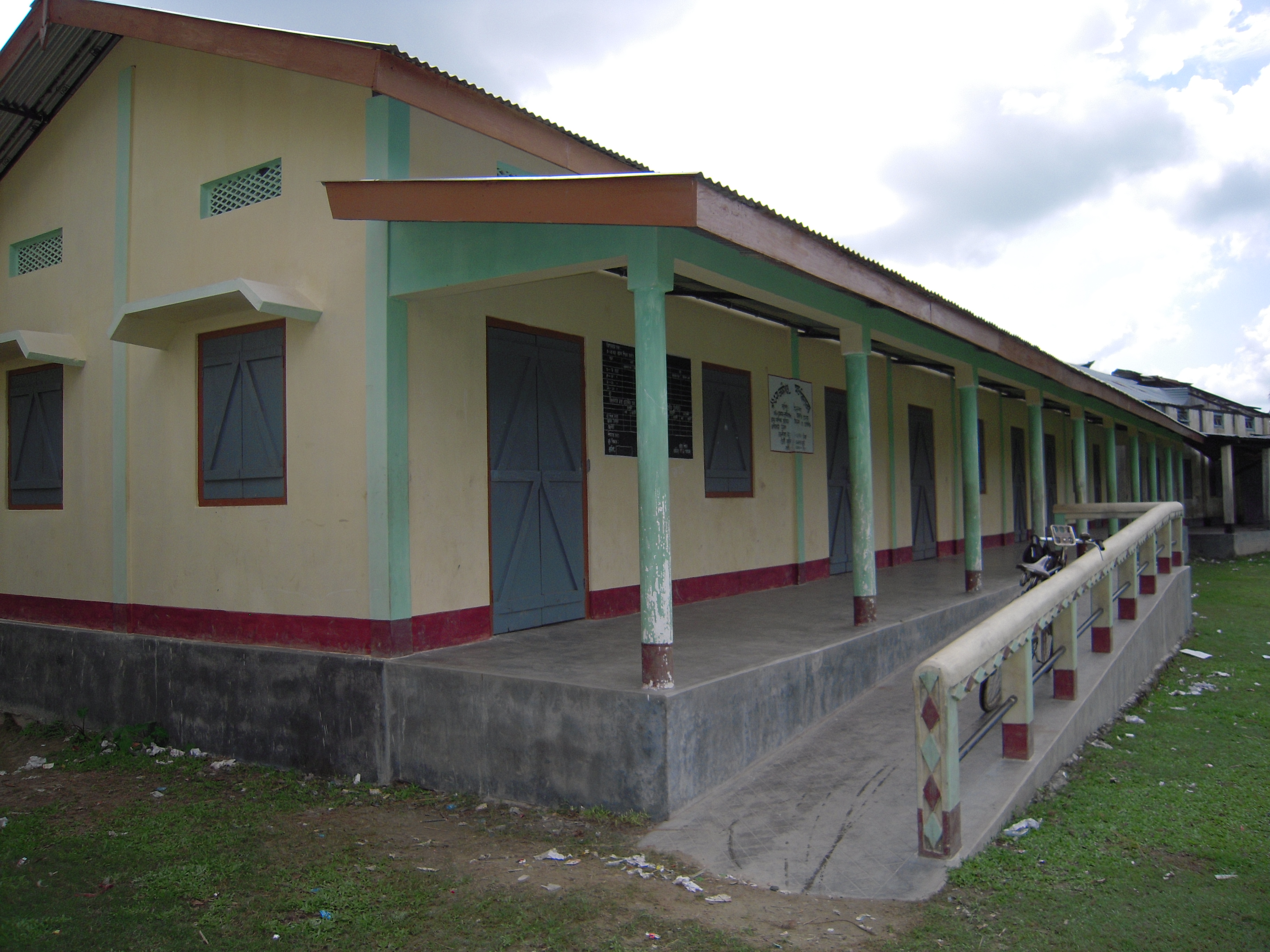
- Lakhiganj Maktab School (2008)

- Location in Assam, India Lakhiganj (India)
- Coordinates: 26°17′23″N 90°13′41″E
- Country: India
- State: Assam
- District: Dhubri

Population (2011)
  - Total: 2,011

Languages
  - Official: Assamese
- Time zone: UTC+5:30 (IST)
- PIN: 783351
- Telephone code: 03667 284000
- Vehicle registration: AS
- Nearest city: Bilasipara
- Lok Sabha constituency: Dhubri
- Vidhan Sabha constituency: Bilasipara East

Lakhiganj is a village in the Dhubri district of Assam, around 8 kilometres (5.0 mi) north of Bilasipara. It is situated on the NH 117A between Bilasipara and Kokrajhar, around 12 kilometres (7.5 mi) from Kokrajhar and 9 kilometres (5.6 mi) from Fakiragram Junction railway station. In 2011, it had a population of 2,011 and a 75% literacy rate.

== Overview ==
Goalpariya and Assamese are the main dialects spoken in Lakhiganj, with Marwari, Bihari and Bengalis making up secondary ethnolinguistic groups.

The village's primary educational institution is the Lakhiganj Higher Secondary School (established 1952). Other schools include Lakhiganj J. B. School, established 1866; Lakhiganj Middle English Madrassa, established 1928; Lakhiganj Maktab (Primary) School, established 1928; Lakhiganj M. V. School; Lakhiganj Girls’ High School at Chokapara; and Nabadaya Jatiya Bidyalaya. Mandirs Lakhiganj Jam-e Masjid and Hafizia Madrassa, for Kali and Durga, respectively, are the main religious centers of the locality Lakhiganj Bright Club and Library is a popular recreational hub for the local youth. The town is also home to a bazaar, post office, a Gaon Panchayat, a police outpost, a bank and a state dispensary.

== Economy ==
Lakhiganj is primarily dependent on small-scale business. A regional office of Jute Corporation of India (JCI) purchases, stores and operates in the village. The M. S. Dugar Group of Companies was established in Lakhiganj in 1906 and provides warehousing facility to JCI.
