= Harirhat =

Harirhat Harirhat Bazar
- Village
- Location in Assam, India Harirhat (India)
- Coordinates: 26.179422°N 89.834128°E
- Country: India
- State: Assam
- District: Dhubri

Government
  - Type: Panchayat
  - Body: Harirhat Gaon

Population (2011)
  - Total: 3,073

Languages
  - Official: Assamese
- Time zone: UTC+5:30 (IST)
- PIN: 783334
- Vehicle registration: AS

Harirhat is a small village and marketplace located in the Golakganj subdivision Dhubri district of Assam, India. It is part of the "Village of Purni" area, an ancient settlement. The local panchayat office is situated at Purni Gaon and administers Harirhat Gaon Panchayat.

== Location ==
Harirhat is situated approximately 214 kilometers from Dispur, the state capital of Assam. Other nearby state capitals include Gangtok (156.8 km), Shillong (232.6 km), and Agartala (317.7 km). Harirhat is close to several other towns, including Dhubri, Gauripur, Golakganj, Agomani, and Cooch Behar.

The nearest railway stations to Harirhat are located in Agomani, Golakganj, Dhubri, and Bongaigaon. The nearest airport is Rupsi Airport, which is approximately 12 kilometers from Harirhat.

== Education ==
Harirhat is home to educational institutions including:

- M.E. School (Harirhat Bazar)
- Kachakhana Higher Secondary School
- Kachakhana M.V. School
- Shankar Dev Shishu Niketan Kachakhana (Purni)
