= National Highway 17 (India) =

National highway in India

National Highway 17
- Map of National Highway 17 in red

Route information
- Part of AH48
- Length: 592 km (368 mi)

Major junctions
- West end: NH 10 in Sevoke
- List: NH 717A in Bagrakote; NH 717 in Chalsa; NH 517 / AH48 in Telipara; NH 317 in Birpara; NH 27 in Falakata; NH 127B in Tamarhat Mor; NH 117A in Bilasipara; NH 117 in North Salmara; NH 217 in Paikan; NH 217 in Dudhnai
- East end: NH 27 in Guwahati

Location
- Country: India
- States: West Bengal & Assam

Highway system
- Roads in India; Expressways; National; State; Asian
← NH 10	→ NH 27

National Highway 17 (NH 17) is a National Highway in India running from Sevoke in West Bengal to Guwahati in Assam, with extension to Rangapara in Assam going on currently

== Route ==
=== Bengal ===
It starts from its junction with NH-10 at Coronation Bridge in Sevoke, Darjeeling district and connects

- Mongpong, Kalimpong district,
- Damdim Tea Estate, Kalimpong district,
- Bagrakote, Chalsa, Murti, Chapramari, Dhupjhora, Nagarkata, Binnaguri, Telipara Jalpaiguri district,
- Birpara, Falakata, Sonarpur Alipurduar district
- Coochbehar, Tufanganj Cooch Behar district in West Bengal;

=== Assam ===
Upon entering Assam, this highway is connecting

- Agomani, Golakganj, Bilasipara, Dhubri district,
- North Salmara, Bongaigaon district,
- Goalpara, Goalpara district,
- Bijoynagar, Boko, Kamrup Metropolitan district. and terminating at its junction with NH-27 near Guwahati in Assam

== Extension ==
Further 72 kilometres (45 mi) extension of this Highway is being done to connect Rangapara via Rangiya, Goreswar, Tangla, Udalguri.

== See also ==
- List of national highways in India
- National Highways Development Project
- National Highway 66 (India) previously NH-17 before 2010 A.D.
