= 80 Medium Regiment (India) =

Indian Army artillery unit

- Active: 1965 – present
- Country: India
- Allegiance: India
- Branch: Indian Army
- Type: Artillery
- Size: Regiment
- Nickname(s): Mighty 80; Team LXXX; Kirni Killers
- Motto(s): Sarvatra, Izzat-O-Iqbal (Everywhere with Honour and Glory).
- Colors: Red & Navy Blue
- Equipment: 130 mm guns

Insignia
- Abbreviation: 80 Med Regt

80 Medium Regiment is part of the Regiment of Artillery of the Indian Army.

== Formation ==
80 Medium Regiment was raised on 1 March 1965 at Chardwar under the command of Lieutenant Colonel NGK Nair. It consists of 801, 802 and 803 medium batteries.

== Equipment ==
The regiment has been equipped with 130 mm guns since 2012. Prior to 2012, the regiment had the following guns in the chronological order-

- 3.7 inch gun
- 75/24 pack howitzer
- 25-pounder gun
- 122 mm howitzer
- 105 mm Light Field Gun
- 105 mm Indian Field Gun

== Operations ==
The regiment has taken part in the following operations –

- Indo-Pakistan War of 1965: In the nascent days of the regiment, when the guns and equipment were yet to be issued, a company strong column under Major SK Verma saw action in Golakganj in an infantry role.
- Operation Meghdoot:
  - In 1984, 2nd Lieutenant DS Bisht was tasked to occupy the observation post at Siachen glacier. Before he could reach the location, he was informed that the post was occupied by the Pakistan Army. He engaged the enemy using mortars providing effective artillery fire to destroy them. He was subsequently awarded the Sena Medal.
  - Two gun detachments of the regiment were heli-dropped and assembled under the guidance of Captain Vijay Kohli. These guns occupied the highest known gun position in the world at 18,000 feet.
  - In 2002, Captain Badal Singh Sikarwar was posthumously awarded the Sena Medal for his gallant action, when he destroyed an enemy mortar position and a heavy machine gun post.
- Operation Kasba : In August – September 1991, the unit was deployed in Poonch sector to provide fire support to the infantry engaged in evicting Pakistani troops who had crossed the Line of Control into the Kasba village. The regiment carried guns along mountainous terrain and was especially effective on the night of 1/2 September 1991. It supported 93 Infantry Brigade and 192 Mountain Brigade for the re-capture of Kirni village between 28 August and 3 September 1991. During these operations, Havildar S Nagarajan was awarded the Sena Medal and Gunner Virupaxappa was awarded the COAS Commendation Card.
- Operation Vijay : The regiment was part of an Infantry Division during the Kargil war.
- In 2001, the regiment was inducted into the Nowshera sector, where it provided artillery fire support at the Line of Control.
- In 2011, the regiment was located at Gangtok and occupied the highest observation post in the Eastern sector. It was also responsible for raising four porter companies. The regiment provided timely assistance and relief during the earthquake which hit Sikkim on 18 September 2011.
- Operation Parakram : 2000-2003 - counter insurgency operations
- Operation Rakshak : 2005-2009 - counter insurgency operations
- Operation Snow Leopard : 2018-2020 The regiment participated actively in Op Snow Leopard. The regiment was one of the first regiment to be inducted into Area of operations as soon as the hostile situation arrived. The unit was instrumental in coordination of artillery support plan of Infantry deployment of five units and established observation grid for the operations.

== Honours and awards ==
- Personnel from the regiment have been awarded the following –
  - Sena Medals – 7
  - COAS Commendation Cards – 8
  - GOC-in-C Commendation Cards – 24
- The regiment has produced five Generals and three Brigadiers.
- The regiment has been awarded the following unit citations -
  - GOC-in-C Southern Command Citation - 2017
  - GOC-in-C Southwestern Command Citation - 2023

== Motto ==
The motto of the regiment is Veluvom, Veluvom, Vetricondu Selluvom, which translates to Victory, Victory, Ahead with Victory. The battle cry is Veeravel Vetrivel, a war cry used in ancient Tamil and means Victorious Vel, Courageous Vel. (Vel is the holy spear of Murugan, the Hindu war deity).

== Notable personnel ==
- Brigadier Gurmeet Kanwal – He was commissioned into the regiment and was a noted author and strategic analyst.

== See also ==
- List of artillery regiments of Indian Army
