= Borokalia Nashkara =

Village in India, Assam

- Village
- Nickname: Nashkara
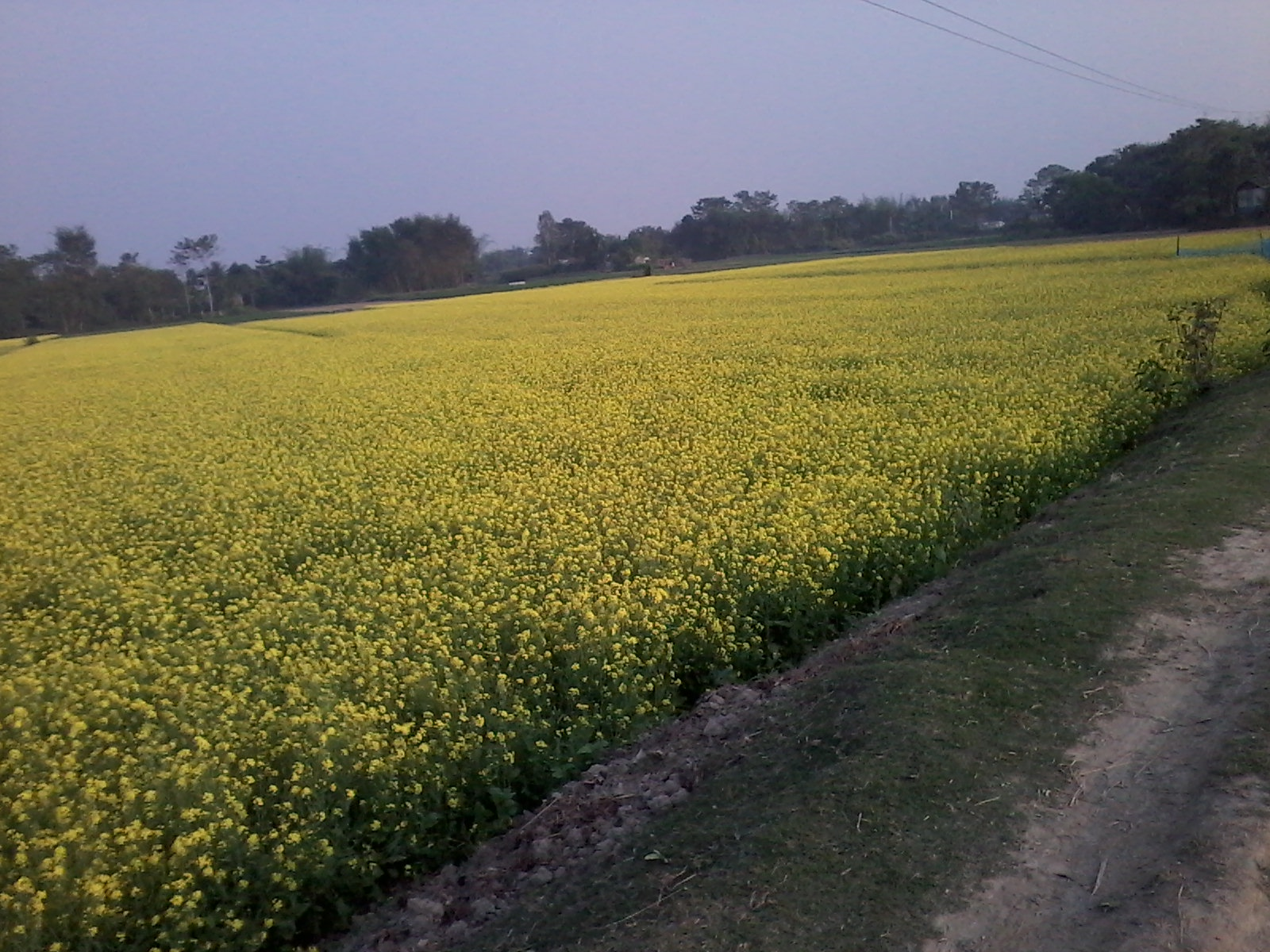

- Location on the map of Assam
- Coordinates: 25.9308°N 90.0740°E
- Country: India
- Seat: South Salmara

Population (2011)
  - Total: 8,273
- Time zone: UTC+5:30 (Indian Time)
- Postal code: 783330
- ISO 3166 code: IN-AS-DB

Borokalia Nashkara is a revenue village under South Salmara in Dhubri district, India. There are several other small villages associated with this village. A revenue village consisting of about 10 small villages and three major villages. This also covered the Nashkara Gaon Panchayat. The distance from Nashkara village to the state capital Dispur is around 177 km. The state capital of Lucknow is different from Nashkara and is 245.5 km. Nearby prosperous capitals include Silong 184.6 km, Gangtok 213.7 km, Agartala 261.9 km.

== Name origin ==
There is no proper history or evidence on how the name of this village was Borokalia Nashkara. But according to a report, in the old days, there was a Raba named "Naskar" living in the area. And the name of the village is Nashkara as per the name of the same one. Another report says that dates "juice" were produced more in this village in the old days. And elderly people also called "juice" as "nos". Therefore, the "made" verb is said to have been added and discarded as the juice or the nos were produced in this place. (i.e. the place where the juice is made).

== Peoples ==
According to the Census 2011 the population of the most visited village is 8273 and among them 4180 males and 4093 females.

== Villages of Nashkara Village ==
- Choochbari
- Dhapan Para
- Boro Nashkara
- Soto Nashkara
- Nashkara Bilpara
- Chinabari
- Radhuram Chala
- Shershow Bhanger Par
- Shimulchala
- Amchala

=== The village and distance near the Nashkara ===
- Bauskata 7.7 km,
- Baladoba 6.9 km,
- Rawatary 6.6 km,
- Hamidabad 5.4 km,
- Tumani 11.0 km,
- Fakirganj 5.4 km,
- Patakata 13.8 km,
- Airkata 4.0 km.

== Language ==
The first language of The Nashkara is Assamese, Bengali. Though the public language of the village is Assamese but most people use the Bengali at home or with others. A public event or government office can only be seen using Assamese language. Besides, it is also forced to speak Assamese language in school colleges etc. People from Nashkara village can be seen using Assamese language for communication when they go to the city or city or other places in Assam.

== Special ==
The Nashkara village is located in the UTC 5.30 time area and following this Indian Standard Time (IST). The time when the snare swells is changed from IST to 30 minutes. The direction of driving vehicles in the Nashkara is left and all vehicles have to be left while driving. The national currency of the Nashkara is used by the people of India and its international currency code is INR. Nashkara phones and mobiles can be accessed by associating the Indian country's dialing code +91 from abroad. People of The Nashkara follow the format dated day/month/year in their daily life.

== Main Occupation ==
Most of the people in this village are living in agriculture. A few people do government jobs. Though the main occupation of the village is agriculture but there is not enough land, the villagers have made a different way. For example, some people shopkeeping. Some fishing, some go to Guwahati or other states and work in a private company. Some have again made money by setting up non-government schools. Some work in the textile industry (looms) of Assam. In looms, the cloth sits on the ground and sells them to the places of The Meghalaya, Hatsingimari, Mankachar etc.

== Crops produced in the plantation ==
Rice, Jute, Wheat, Sari, Tichi, Peas, Boots, Sugarcane, Chillies, Potatoes, Vendors, Kerala, Jatilao, Pumpkin, Tomatoes, Beans, Cabbage, Cauliflower, Oalkavi, Belas, Carrots, Onion, Garlic etc.

== Traffic ==
Most roads or roads in Nashkara village are raw. Though some roads are seen to be wet but they are very bad.

=== Railway Station ===
The railway station near Naska is Dhubri railway station which is about 13.9 km away (which is to be taken by water way). The following table shows its distance from other railway stations and Mamakudy.

Dhubri Railway Station	13.9 km
Gologanj Railway Station	30.9 km
Gauripur Railway Station	20.9 km

=== Airport ===
The airport near Rupsi which is 28.9 km from Nashkara village away. It was built by the British government during World War II. Mainly for military purposes. Till 1983, Indian Airlines and some private commercial flights operated regularly between Kolkata, Guwahati and Dhubri. The port was closed for almost 36 years thereafter. The GoI is yet to complete the repair of this Rupsi airport after nearly 36 years.

== Town ==
The city/important place near the Borokalia Nashkara village is 14.1 km away from Dhubri district. The cities surrounding the Nashkara are as follows.

Dhubri	14.1 km
Gauripur	20.9 km
Bilasipara	37.3 km
Lakhipur	A. 30 km

== Educational Institutions ==
There are a number of government and non-government educational institutions in the country. Which have been playing a great role in building the future of the students of this region.

=== Government Schools ===
- Dakhin Nashkara Bilpara LP School
- Santipur Boraibar Girls ME Madrassa
- West Shimuchala LP School
- 174 No Amchala LP School
- Barkalia Nashkara High School
- 2163 No A.K. Mondal Memorial LP School

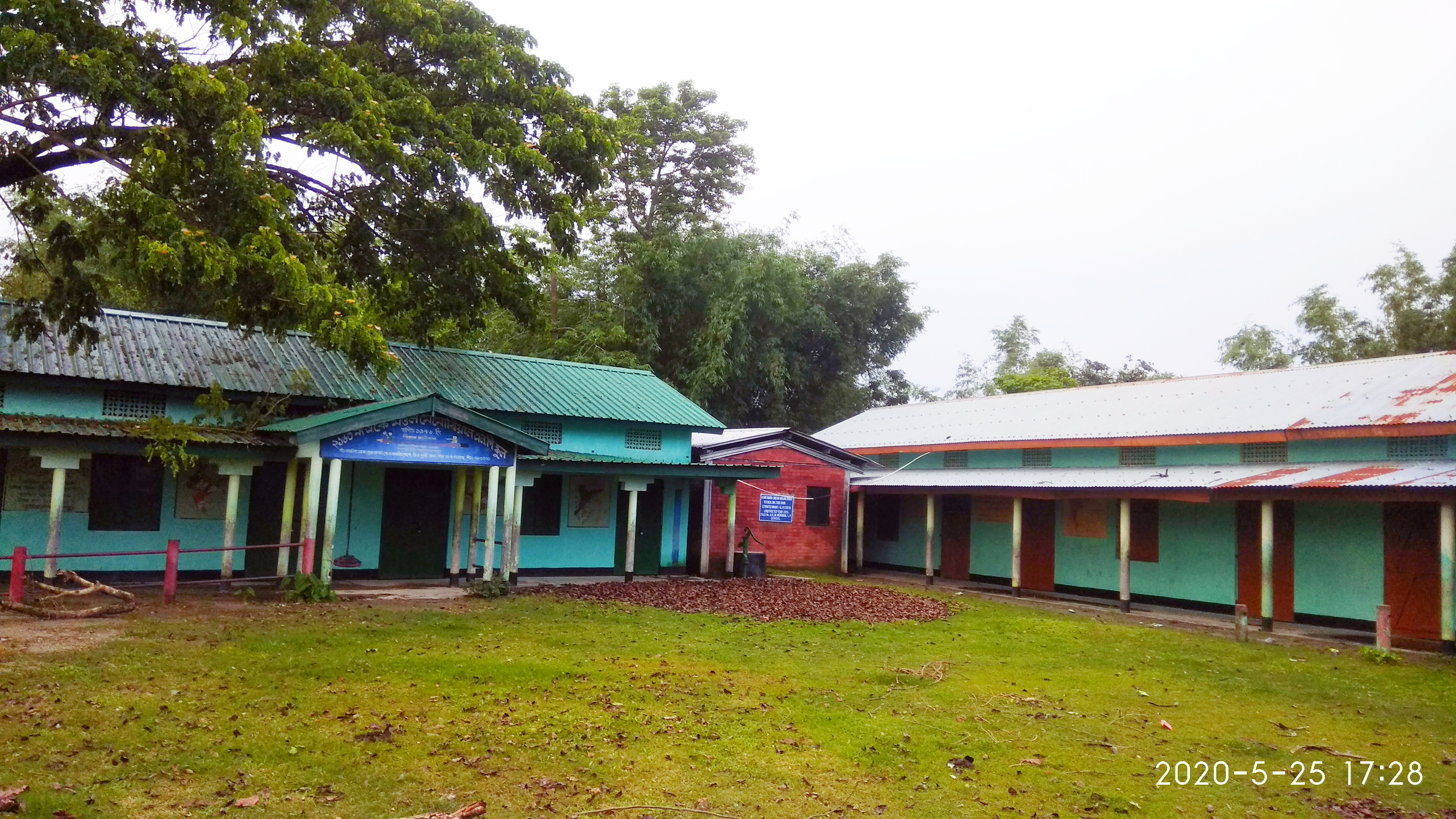
2163 No AK Mondal Memorial LP School

- Abu Bakkar Bepari Memorial LP School
- Jyoti High Madrassa
- Shershow Bhangerpar Girls School
- JU Ahmed Memorial LP School
- Chinabari LP School
- Nashkara Noyapara LP School
- 1185 No Nashkara LP School
- Shimualchala LP School
- Chandipara LP School
- Radhuram Chariali Pre-Sanior Madrasa
- B N Bilpara LP School
- Barkalia Noshkora Navamilan ME School
- Khedaimari Char LP School
- 267 No Baro Kaliarpar LP School
- Mir Boxo Khan Memorial LP School
- Radhuram Chala LP School
- Nashkara ME School
- Chandipara ME Madrasa

=== Private Sector Schools ===
- Chandipara Smart Account, Chandipara
- MB Jatiya Bidyalaya, Radharam Chala
- Jonaky Jatiya Bidyalaya, Shimuchala
- Dr. Zakir Husain Academy, Amchala
- S.B. Vidhya Pith, Amchala
