= Kheksialy =

Village in Dhubri district, Assam, India

Kheksialy খেকশিয়ালী
- Village
- Location of Kheksialy in Assam
- Coordinates: 26.0785°N 89.8625°E
- Country: India
- State: Assam
- District: Dhubri district
- Sub-district: Golakganj (Part)
- Development block: Rupshi
- Gaon Panchayat: Dhepdhepi

Area
  - Total: 375.18 ha (927.1 acres)

Population (2011)
  - Total: 2,826
  - Density: 753.2/km^{2} (1,951/sq mi)
- Time zone: UTC+5:30 (IST)
- Postal Index Number: 783334
- Vehicle registration: AS17
- Police station: Golakganj
- Post office: Debottar Hasdaha
- Nearest market: Dhep Dhepi Bazar

Kheksialy is a small rural village located in the Golakganj sub-district of Dhubri district in the Indian state of Assam. The village falls under the administrative jurisdiction of the Dhepdhepi Gaon Panchayat and is part of the Rupshi Development Block. It is situated near Dhep Dhepi Bazar.

Kheksialy Village Map, Dhubri, Assam

== Location ==
it is located in Dhubri district in western Assam. It has the coordinates 26°04′42″N 89°51′45″E. village is located near Dhepdhepi Bazar.

== Administration ==
it is under local government office Dhepdhepi Gram Panchayat in Rupshi development block. It falls under Golakganj sub-district of Dhubri district.

== Demographics ==
According to the 2011 Census of India, the total population of Kheksialy was 2,826. The census village code is 280872."District Census Handbook: Dhubri, Assam". Office of the Registrar General and Census Commissioner of India. 2011.

== Language and community ==
There is a large Koch Rajbongshi community in the village and Goalpariya is spoken.

== Education ==
Here are 4 primary schools:

Uttar Pub Kheksialy LP School 312 No. Khekshiali LPS Dakhin Pub Kheksialy L.P. School Paschim Kheksialy LP School.
