= Chokapara =

- village
- Location in Assam, India Chokapara (India)
- Coordinates: 26°17′2″N 90°13′35″E
- Country: India
- State: Assam
- District: Dhubri

Population (2001)
  - Total: 1,148

Languages
  - Official: Assamese
- Time zone: UTC+5:30 (IST)
- PIN: 783351
- Telephone code: 91-3667
- Vehicle registration: AS
- Nearest city: Bilasipara
- Lok Sabha constituency: Dhubri
- Vidhan Sabha constituency: Bilasipara East

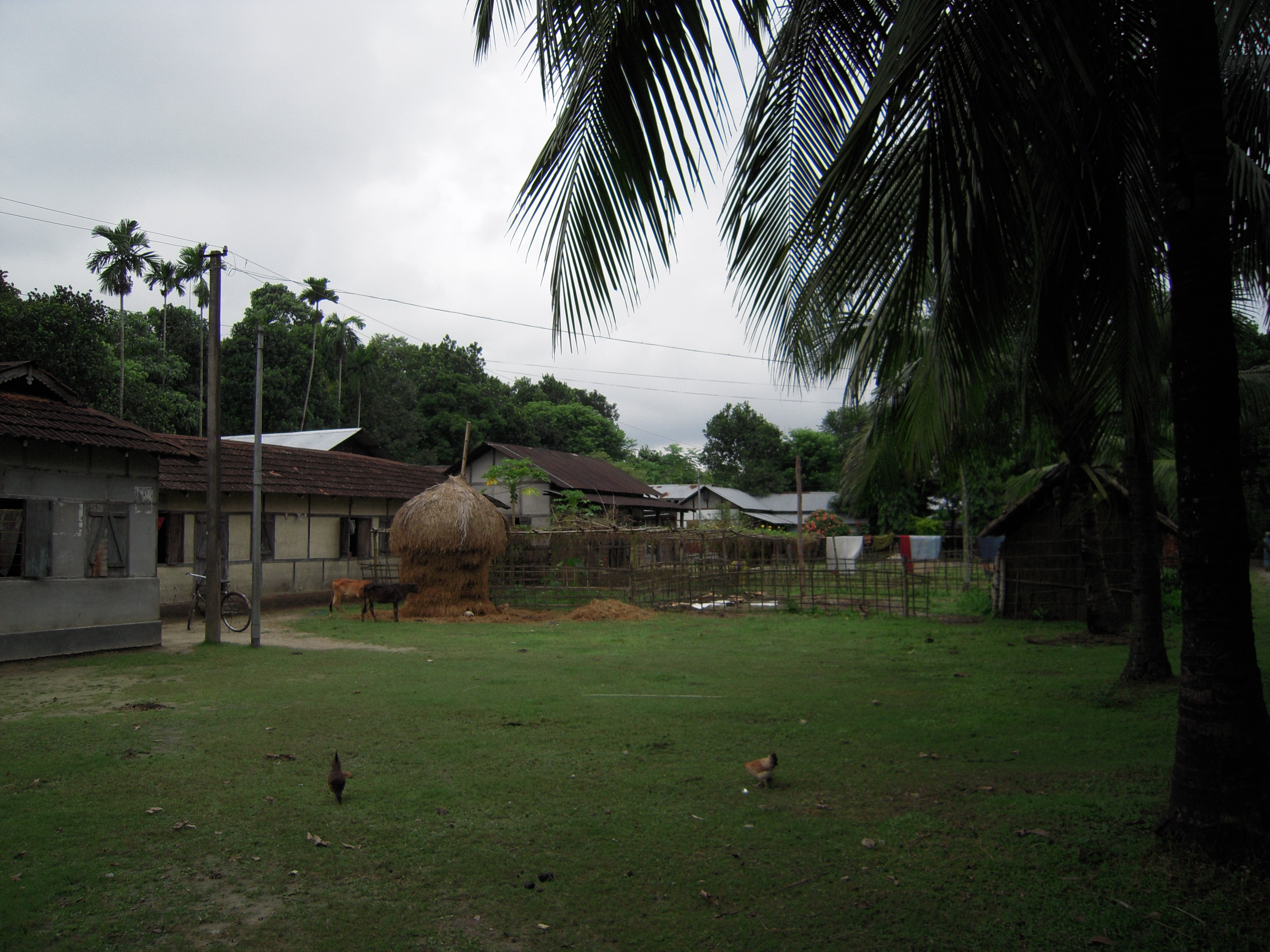
A view of Chokapara village, a typical Goalpariya village

Chokapara is a village under Lakhiganj Gaon Panchayat, some 7 kilometers distance north from the Bilasipara town (sub-divisional headquarters) in the Dhubri district of Assam, one of the seven sister states of North-East India. It is one of the very old revenue villages of the erstwhile Goalpara district. According to 2001 India census, Chokapara had a population of 1,148 in 253 households. Males constitute ~52 % of the population and females ~48 %.

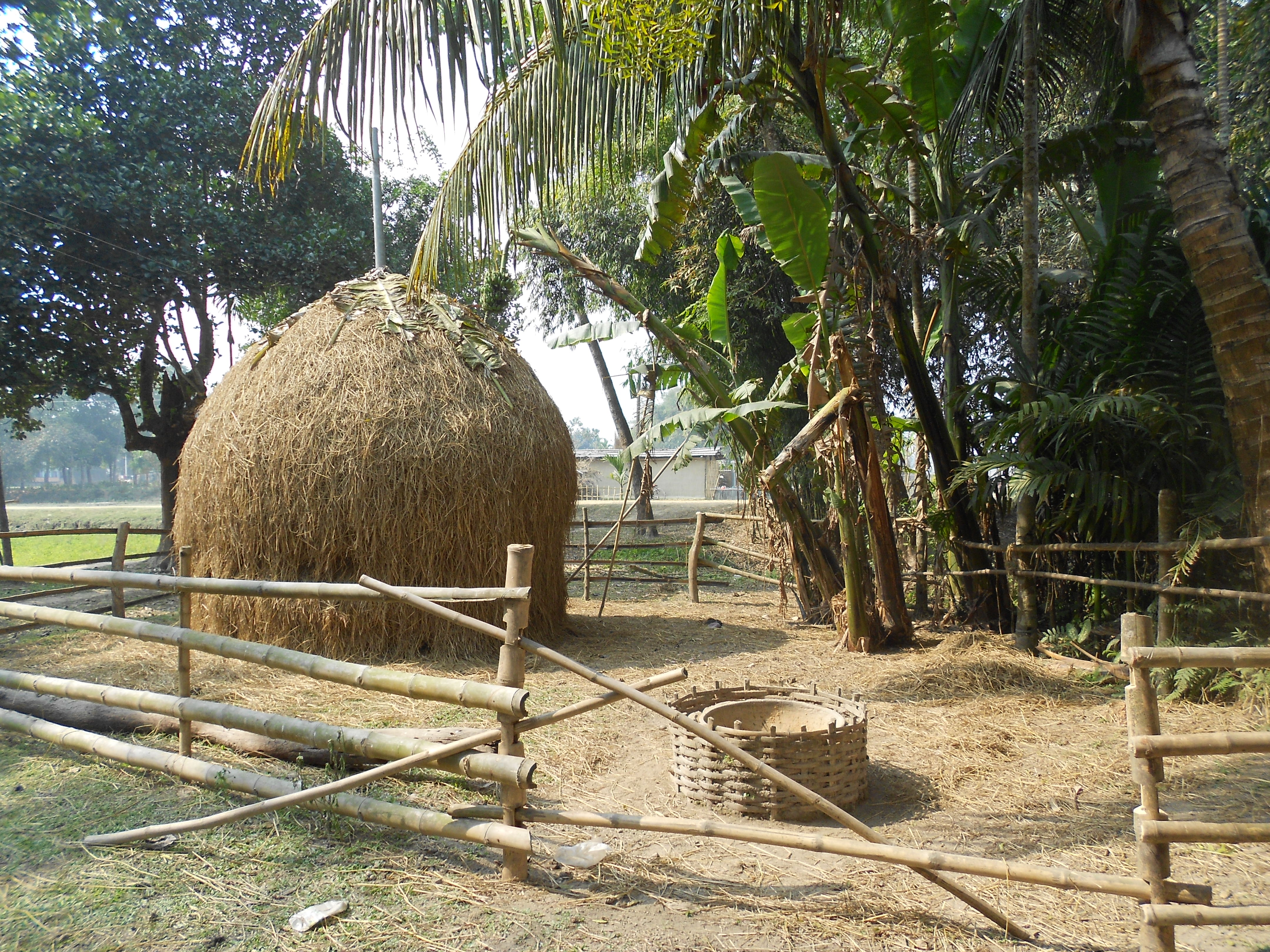
A traditional way to shelf the rice straw in chokapara

== History ==
The name of the village Chokapara came from an interesting story. In local dialect, Choka means sharp and para means village. So it is a sharp village, but not in the sense that people are sharp. According to folklore, in the early days the village was covered by dense forests and the neighbouring villagers scared to visit the village due to the presence of some demons called Daini especially in the evening hours. So, after sunset people did not come out of home or visit the village as the Dainis remained vigilant (sharp).

== People ==
The village constitutes both Muslims and Hindus of nearly equal percentage and they have been living harmoniously for centuries. The Hindus belong to the Nath community and are traditionally known as Jogi. The Muslims follow the sunni branch of Islam. Traditionally the village has a head called Gaonbuda and a village court which looks after small disputes.

== Language ==
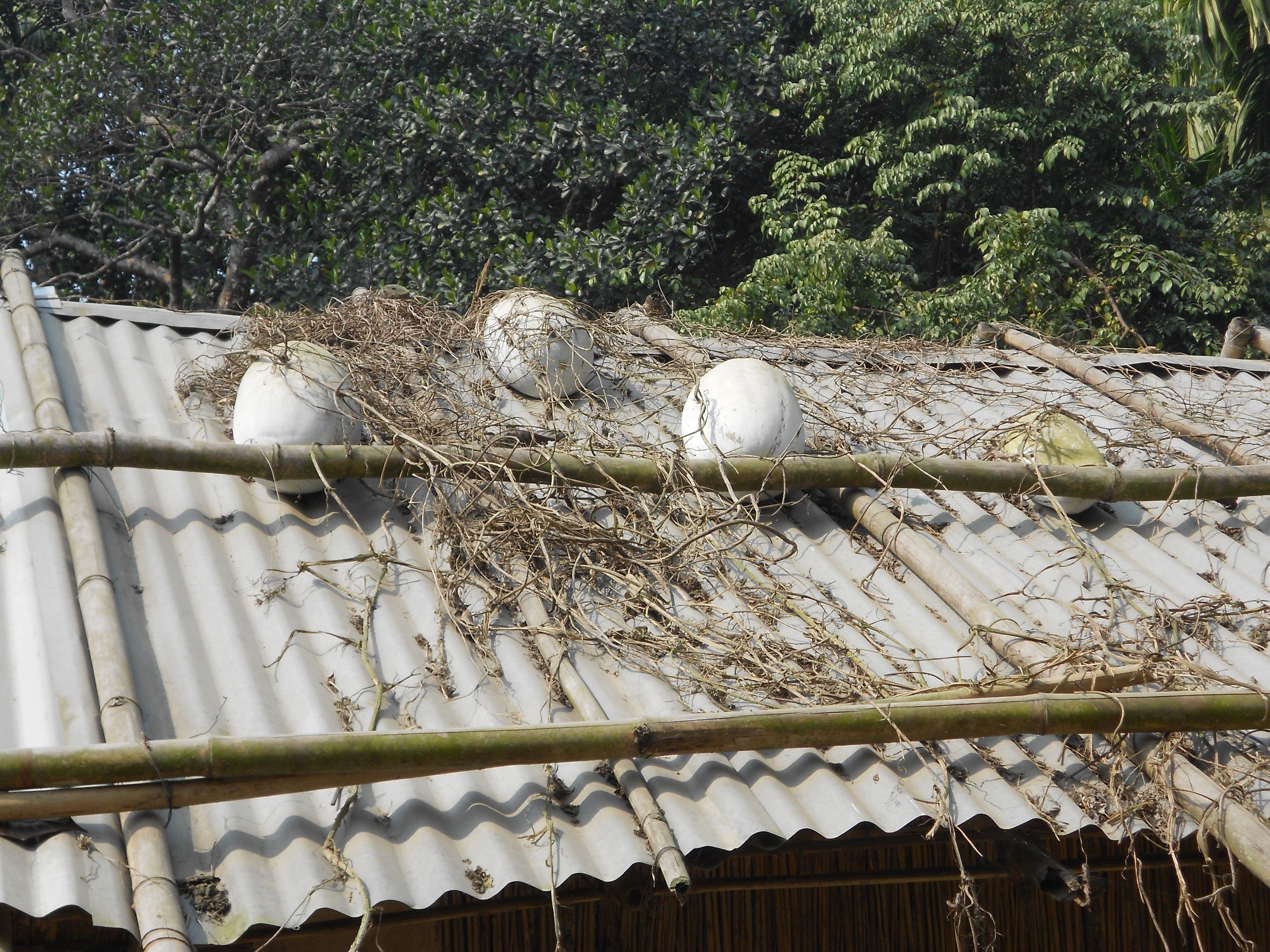
Some mature white gourds on the roof of a house in Chokapara

The people of Chokapara basically speak Goalpariya, which is a dialect of Assamese. Their official language and medium of education are primarily Assamese or English.

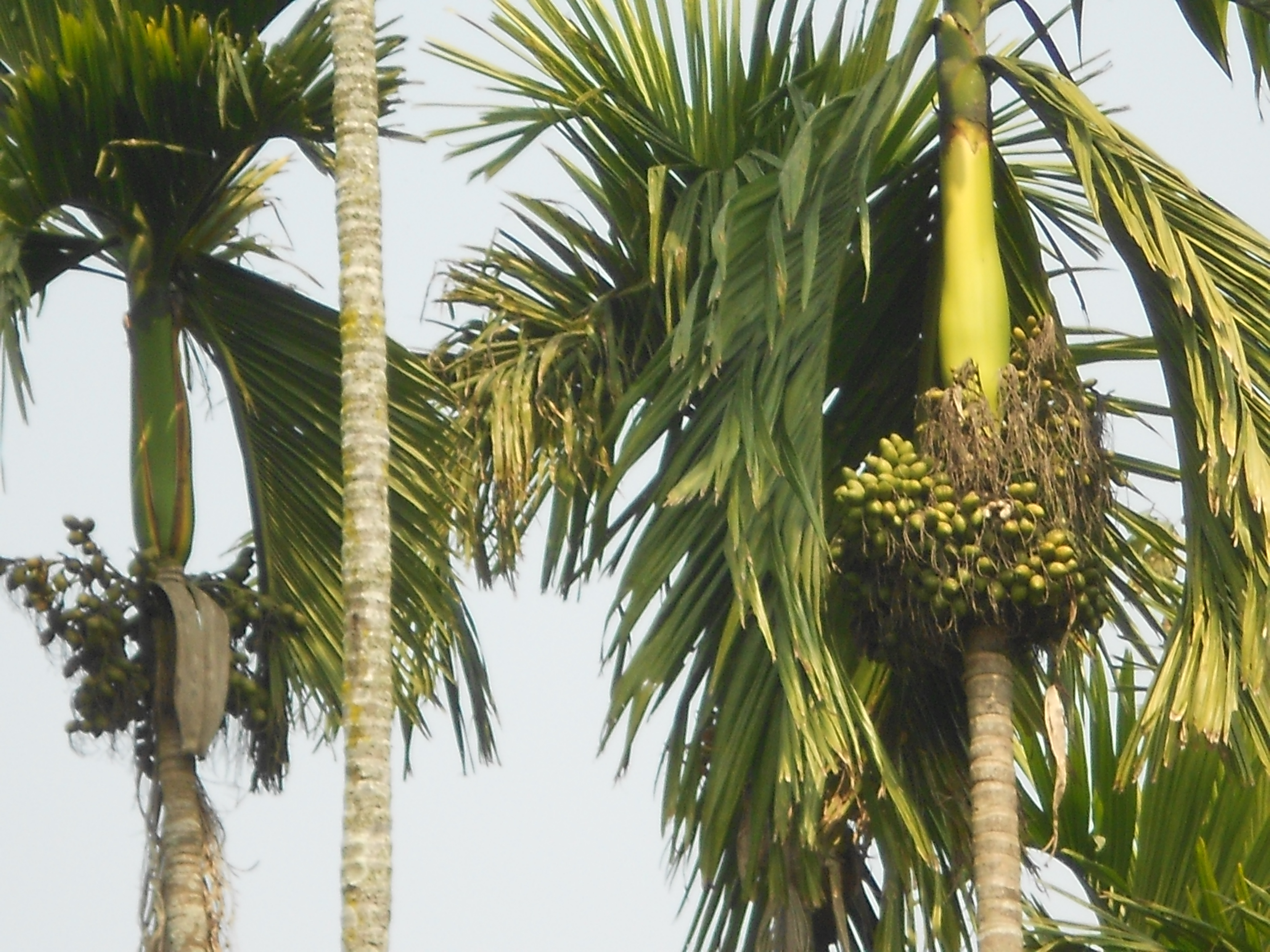
Some areca palm with nuts in Chokapara

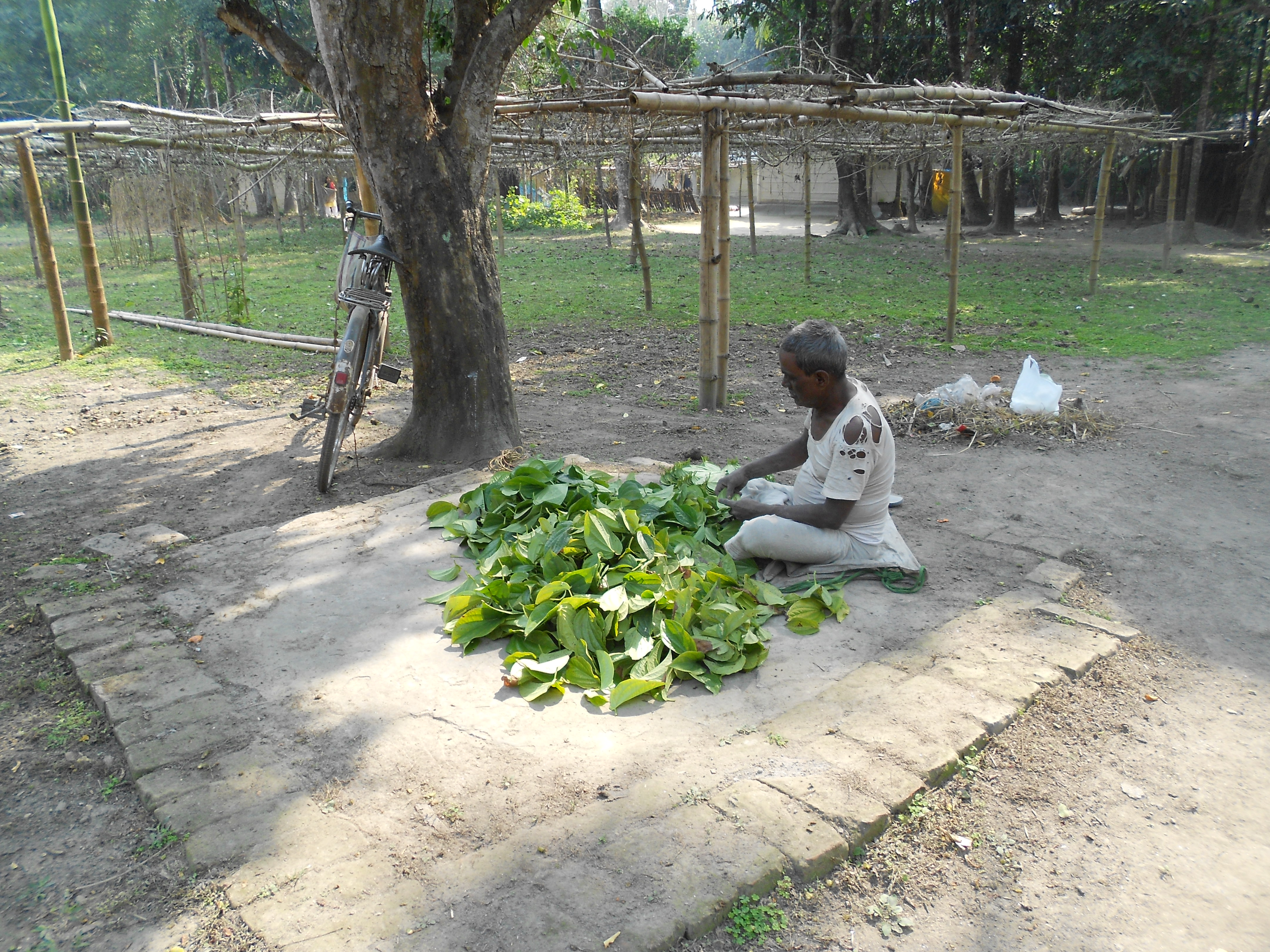
A farmer is trimming betel leaves in Chokapara

== Culture ==
The culture of the village as part of the broader Assamese culture is a hybrid one, developed over time from traditional Hindu value systems, Islamic influence and some elements of local tribal culture. Symbolism is an ancient cultural practice of this region and is still a very important part of life of the village as they use Gamosa, Xorai, etc. to represent identity, pride, etc. A unique cultural trait of the people is their love for areca-nut and betel leaves. They have great respect towards the traditional silk garments and forefathers and elderly.

== Economy ==
Traditionally the village depended exclusively on agriculture for livelihood. The land around the village is very fertile. Paddy is the principal crop traditionally grown for consumption as well as sale, although oil seeds (like mustard, sunflower), jute, vegetables and other cash crops are also widely cultivated. These days, the people, especially the younger generation is looking for newer areas of livelihood. The new generation is inclined to business and higher education. As a result a number of Self-Help Groups (SHG), a District Rural Development Agency scheme, Government of Assam, are coming up and doing well.

== Education ==
Education holds a significant place in the culture of the village, with many of the residents being teachers at the local schools. Some of them are also working in various Government offices in Bilasipara or in nearby towns. The village has a primary school, named 1933 No. Chokapara Nimnabuniyadi Bidyalaya (estd 1962) and a Girls' High School (estd 1993) for secondary education. Lakhiganj Higher Secondary School is also situated in the village. Of late, the village is producing some good lecturers, administrators, researchers, defence personals, etc.

== Sports and Festivals ==
Sports and cultural activities hold a special place in the life of the village. Most popular sports in the village are volleyball, cricket, football, badminton and kabadi. Until recently, the village possessed one of the best kabadi teams in the sub-division. Goalpariya folk song is very popular in the village. The people are moderately religious, they celebrate Bihu, Eid ul-Fitr, Eid ul-Adha, Durga puja, etc. in great spirit.
