= National Highway 317A (India) =

National Highway in India

National Highway 317A
- Map of the National Highway in red

Route information
- Part of AH48
- Length: 18.2 km (11.3 mi)

Major junctions
- South end: Hasimara
- North end: Jaigaon

Location
- Country: India
- States: West Bengal

Highway system
- Roads in India; Expressways; National; State; Asian
← NH 317	→ NH 317

National Highway 317A, commonly called NH 317A is a national highway in the state of West Bengal in India. It is a branch of National Highway 317. NH 317A is a very important road providing connectivity to Bhutan. This national highway is also part of Asian Highway 48.

== Route ==
NH317A connects Hasimara and Jaigaon at Bhutan border in the state of West Bengal.

== Junctions ==
NH 317 Terminal near Hasimara.

== See also ==
- List of national highways in India
- List of national highways in India by state
