= Fekamari =

Fekamari Block
- Block
- Location in Assam, India Fekamari Block (India)

Government
  - Type: Democratic

Population
  - Total: 3,050
- Time zone: IST
- Postal code: 783135

Fekamari is a block at South Salmara-Mankachar district in Assam, India. This is a Block Development of Hatsingimari. This block located the bank of the Jinjiram River.
