= National Highway 717 (India) =

National Highway in India

National Highway 717
- Map of National Highway 717 in red
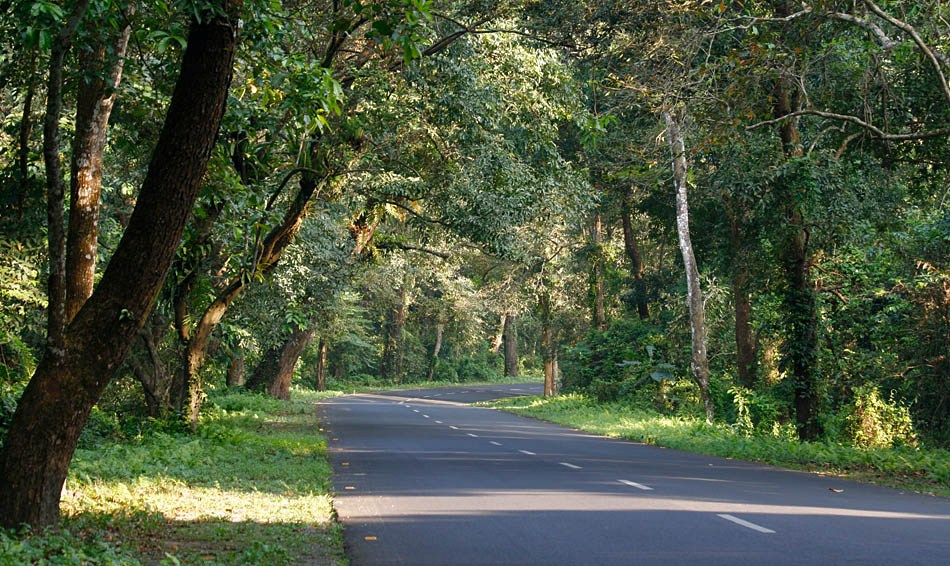
- NH 717 passing through Gorumara National Park

Route information
- Auxiliary route of NH 17
- Part of AH48
- Length: 98 km (61 mi)

Major junctions
- South end: NH 17 in Chalsa
- NH 27 / AH48 in Mainaguri
- North end: N509 in Changrabandha at India/Bangladesh border

Location
- Country: India
- States: West Bengal
- Primary destinations: Mainaguri, Changrabandha, Mekliganj, Tin Bigha, Kuchlibari.

Highway system
- Roads in India; Expressways; National; State; Asian
| ← NH 17 | → NH 27 |

National Highway 717 (NH 717) is a national highway in India. This highway runs entirely in the state of West Bengal. It is a secondary route of National Highway 17. Prior to renumbering of national highways in 2010, the stretch between Chalsa and Mainaguri was part of old national highway 31. By a gazette notification on 27 December 2013, NH-717 route was extended from Mainaguri to land border crossing of India/Bangladesh border near Changrabandha & further to Tin Bigha & Kuchlibari. Mainaguri to Changrabandha stretch of this route is part of Asian Highway 48.

== Route ==
Schematic map of National Highways in India

NH717 connects Chalsa north of Baradighi, Mainaguri, Changrabandha, Mekliganj, Tin Bigha and terminates at Indo/Bangladesh Border in Kuchlibari.

== See also ==
- List of national highways in India
- List of national highways in India by state
