= Agomani railway station =

Railway station in Assam

Agomani

General information
- Location: Station Road, Agomani, Dhubri, Assam; India
- Coordinates: 26°15′N 89°46′E
- Elevation: 40 metres (130 ft)
- System: Indian Railway Station
- Owner: Indian Railways
- Operator: Northeast Frontier Railway
- Line: New Jalpaiguri- to -Dhubri branch line
- Platforms: 2
- Tracks: 3

Construction
- Structure type: At grade
- Parking: Yes
- Cycle facilities: Yes

Other information
- Status: Functioning
- Station code: AGMN
- Division(s): Alipurduar

History
- Opened: 2010
- Former names: Eastern Bengal Railway
Location
- Location within Assam Location within India

Agomani Railway Station is a small regular train station under Northeast Frontier railway zone in Dhubri district of Assam, India.
