= Coronation Bridge =

Bridge in West Bengal, India

Coordinates: 26.902855°N 88.473265°E

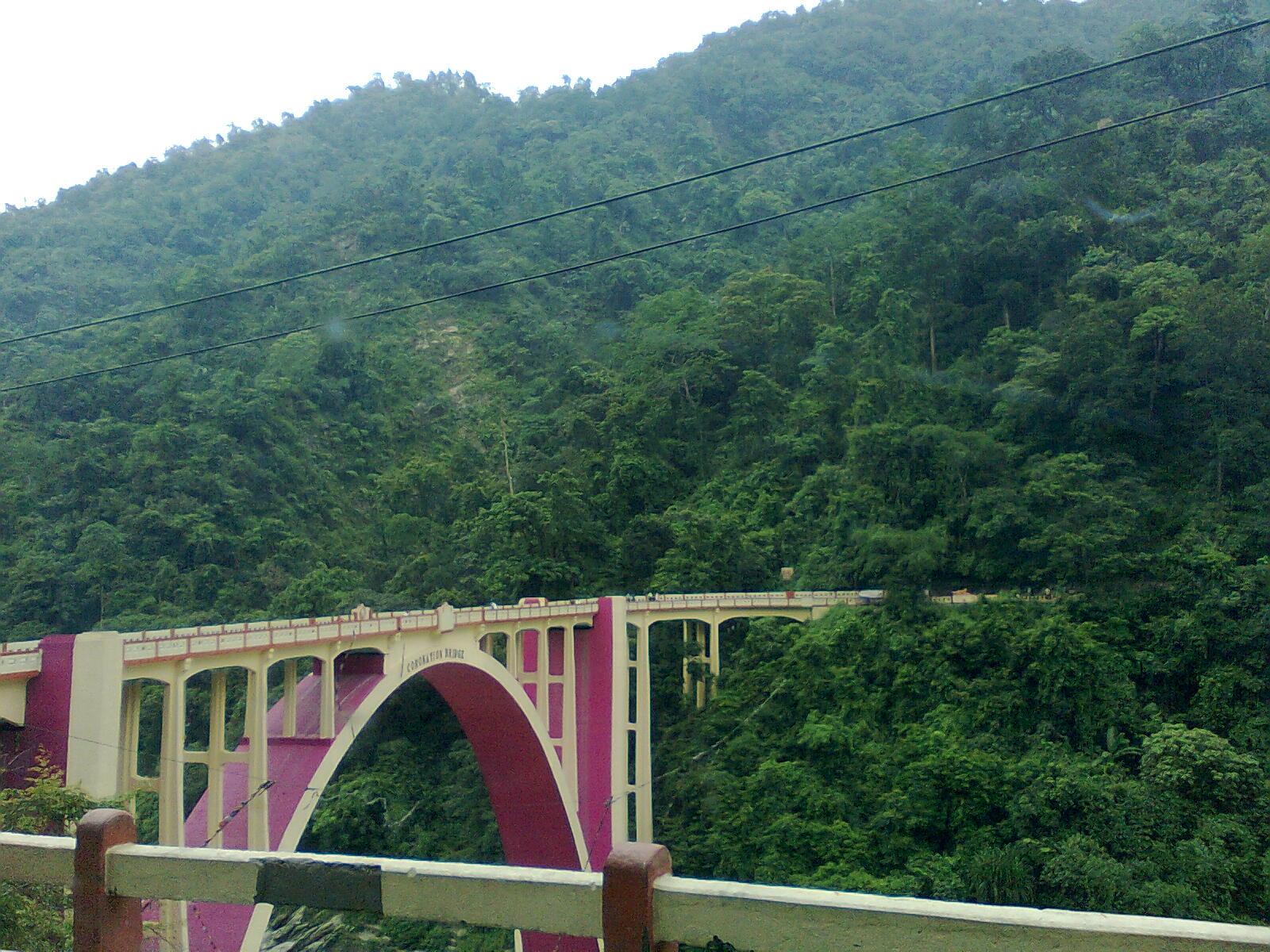
- Spandrel-arch bridge in West Bengal
- Carries: two lanes of National Highway 17 traffic
- Crosses: Teesta River
- Locale: Sevoke
- Other name(s): Baghpool
- Named for: Coronation of George VI and Elizabeth
- Maintained by: NHAI

Characteristics
- Design: Arch bridge
- Material: Steel, Concrete
- Width: 22.8 m (75 ft)
- Height: 39.63 m (130.0 ft)
- Longest span: 81.7 m (268 ft)

History
- Construction start: 1937
- Construction end: 1941
- Construction cost: ₹6 lakh (equivalent to ₹19 crore or US$2.3 million in 2023)

The Coronation Bridge, also known as the Sevoke Roadway Bridge, is a bridge across the Teesta River at Sevoke in the Indian state of West Bengal. The bridge is a part of the National Highway 17 (previously National Highway 31), and connects the districts of Darjeeling and Kalimpong. It runs parallel to Sevoke Railway Bridge which is around 2 km (1.2 mi) away from coronation bridge in River Teesta. It was named to commemorate the coronation of King George VI and Queen Elizabeth in 1937 and was completed in 1941 at a cost of INR 600,000. The foundation stone of the bridge was laid by John Anderson, the-then Governor of Bengal in 1937.

Locals call the bridge Baghpool, meaning tiger bridge, because of the two tiger statues (bagh actually means tiger) at one entrance of the bridge. John Chambers, the last British executive Engineer of the Darjeeling Division Public works department (PWD), carried out the design, drawing and planning of the bridge. Messrs J.C. Gammon, from Bombay, was the contractor. The bridge was built on the Reinforced Concrete system. Since it was not possible to obtain support from the Teesta river bed due to the depth and current of water, the entire bridge was supported by a fixed arch, which had its two ends fixed on rock layers on either side of the river.

== History ==
The Coronation Bridge was constructed by the British to establish a road link from Siliguri to Darjeeling, a key hill station and summer capital of India during colonial rule. The Teesta River’s turbulent flow and the Eastern Himalayan rocky terrain posed significant challenges, making a suspension bridge unfeasible due to monsoon flooding. Three Bengali architects, A.C. Dutt, S.K. Ghosh, and K.P. Roy designed the bridge under John Chambers, the last British executive engineer of the Darjeeling PWD. Construction began in 1937 and took four years, with Messrs J.C. Gammon from Bombay as the contractor. The bridge cost approximately Rs ₹6 lakh (equivalent to ₹19 crore or US$2.3 million in 2023). It was built using a reinforced concrete system. Its fixed arch, anchored in rock layers on both riverbanks, was a novel solution to avoid relying on the riverbed’s unstable depth. Two marble plaques at the bridge commemorate the architects and dignitaries involved. The bridge’s completion in 1941 marked a significant achievement, enhancing connectivity for goods and military supplies.

== Architecture ==
The Coronation Bridge features a spandrel-arch design, inspired by Roman architecture, with a single 120-meter steel arch supported by concrete piers. The main span of R.C. arch is 81.7 m. Its deck was made of steel girders, which are painted red and white for enhancing its visual appeal against the Teesta’s backdrop. The bridge’s open spandrels and curved deck provide stability against the river’s strong currents and seismic risks in the region. Decorative lion statues, often mistaken as tigers, adorn the Jalpaiguri entrance giving the bridge its local name, Bagh Pool. The design with blending steel and concrete, was considered an engineering marvel in the 1930s. It has a projected lifespan of 100 years. Its aesthetic and functional design continues to draw comparisons to other colonial-era bridges, like the Howrah Bridge, though its smaller scale and unique arch make it distinct. The bridge’s location near Sevoke Kali Mandir adds to its cultural and visual significance.

== Maintenance and Current Status ==
In 2011, a 6.9-magnitude earthquake damaged the structure, prompting repairs by the West Bengal PWD. In 2020, an inspection by Jadavpur University engineers revealed a 2.5-foot crack in the arch, leading to restrictions on vehicles over 10 tons. Local groups have been demanding for a parallel bridge since 2011. In January 2025, Central Government approved a new Teesta bridge project, with the PWD tasked to prepare a Detailed Project Report (DPR) costing Rs 1,190 crore. The National Highways Authority of India (NHAI) took over the project in March 2025 due to delays in land acquisition, aiming to reduce strain on the Coronation Bridge.

== Cultural Significance ==
The Coronation Bridge is a vital link on National Highway 31, connecting Siliguri to Darjeeling, Sikkim, and the Dooars. Its proximity to the Sevokeshwari Kali Mandir in Sevoke make it a popular stop for tourists. The bridge’s historical and architectural value has led to calls for heritage status, as it is one of India’s few remaining spandrel-arch bridges. Locally, it’s celebrated as Bagh Pool, with the tiger statues symbolizing strength. However, its aging infrastructure and traffic congestion have sparked debates, with MPs like Raju Bista urging for a new bridge to preserve its legacy while ensuring safety.
