= South Salmara-Mankachar district =

- District of Assam
- Location in Assam
- South Salmara-Mankachar district
- Coordinates: 25.68°N 89.98°E
- Country: India
- State: Assam
- Division: Lower Assam
- Headquarters: Hatsingimari

Government
  - District Commissioner: Shri.Rahul Kumar Gupta , IAS
  - Lok Sabha constituencies: Dhubri (shared with Dhubri district Goalpara district)
  - Vidhan Sabha constituencies: 11 Mankachar LAC

Area
  - Total: 568 km^{2} (219 sq mi)

Population (2011)
  - Total: 555,114
  - Density: 977/km^{2} (2,530/sq mi)
- Time zone: UTC+05:30 (IST)
- ISO 3166 code: IN-AS
- Vehicle registration: AS-34
- Website: southsalmaramankachar.assam.gov.in

South Salmara-Mankachar district is an administrative district in the state of Assam in India. The district headquarter is located at Hatsingimari village which is situated at about 245 km from Guwahati. It was earlier a sub-division of the Dhubri District.

== History ==
South Salmara-Mankachar was created by bifurcating Old Dhubri district in 2016. On 15 August 2015 Assam's Chief Minister Tarun Gogoi announced 5 new administrative district in Assam; South Salmara Mankachar was one among those. On 9 February 2016 Commissioner, Lower Assam and Central Assam Division Md. Mahtab Uddin Ahmed, IAS inaugurated South Salmara Mankachar as an administrative district at a function in Hatsingimari with the presence of thousands of people. There are few historical sites in the district. However, the famous ones are the tomb of Mir Jumla and Kamakhya Temple at Mankachar.

== Geography ==
South Salmara-Mankachar district occupies an area of 568 square kilometres (219 sq mi). It occupies 980/km 2 (2,500/sq mi) of density and is an administrative district in the state of Assam in India. The district headquarters are located at Hatsingimari town which is situated at about 245 km from Guwahati, the state capital. Earlier it was a sub-division of Dhubri District. It shares its borders with Bangladesh in the west and Meghalaya in the south-east.The general topography of South Salmara Mankachar district is plain with patches of small hillocks like Bansali, Rangatari, etc. All these are situated in the southwestern part of the district. Mighty river Brahmaputra is flowing through this district from east to west with its tributaries, and the majority of the population live on chars in the river. Other rivers are Jinjiram, Kalonadi (also known as Ganol) etc. The average annual rainfall of the district is 2,916 mm (114.8 in).

== Economy ==
South Salmara-Mankachar district is primarily dependent on agricultural and forest products. The main source of income is paddy (both winter and autumn) with surplus production. Jute and mustard seed occupy the major share of cash crops. Wheat, maize, pulses and sugarcane are also grown moderately. From forest, mainly timber and bamboo add to the income, though boulders and sand are also available. Fish, milk, meat, and eggs have small contributions to the economy. Currently, three tea gardens, whose contribution to the district economy is almost negligible, cover an area of 1362.33 hectares. Land revenue collection is minimal, whereas tax from check gates and excise duty occupy much of the government exchequer. Devoid of major industrial production, the district uses more funds for administration, development, and welfare works than it provides.

Its rich natural wealth is yet to be explored and some believe that proper utilisation of natural resources could provide a boost for the struggling economy.

== Divisions ==
The district's only sub-division is Hatsingimari (also called Sadar") and there are two revenue circles: Mankachar and South Salmara. Mankachar is a census town and the district has three police stations.

There are two Assam Legislative Assembly constituencies in this district; 21 Mankachar and 22 South Salmara. Both are part of the Dhubri Lok Sabha constituency.

== Demographics ==
According to the 2011 census, the district has a population of 555,114, of which 26,162 (4.71%) live in urban areas. South Salmara-Mankachar has a sex ratio of 968 females per 1000 males and a literacy rate of 50.76%. Scheduled Castes and Scheduled Tribes make up 7,767 (1.40%) and 4,032 (0.73%) of the population respectively.

Religion in South Salmara-Mankachar district (2011)
| Religion | Percent |
| Islam | 95.19% |
| Hinduism | 4.49% |
| Other or not stated | 0.32% |

About 95.19% of the population are Muslims, 4.49% are Hindu and rest 0.3% are Christians and Sikhs.

=== Languages ===
Languages in South Salmara-Mankachar district (2011)
1. Assamese (58.6%)
2. Bengali (39.3%)
3. Hajong (0.45%)
4. Hindi (0.43%)
5. Others (1.24%)

According to the 2011 census, in the district 328,242 speak Assamese, 220,761 speak Bengali, Hindi is spoken by .43% of the population, and Hajong is spoken .45% of the population. Other minority languages account for 1.24% of the population.

== Education ==
There are several renowned schools and colleges in the district. Some of them are:

- Hatsingimari Junior College, Hatsingimari
- Hatsingimari College,Hatsingimari
- Kukurmara Higher Secondary School, Charbari
- Mankachar College
- Little Star English Academy, Mankachar
- South Salmara College
- Rani Bhabani Priya Higher Secondary School, South Salmara

There are many private coaching and tuition classes. Students from Meghalaya and other parts of the district comes here for their schooling.

== Culture ==
The culture of the people in this district is a mixed culture. About 95% of the population are Muslims 4% Hindus and 1% Christians. Most of the people speak Goalpariya (Deshi) dialect. This dialect is nowadays regarded as a sub-language of Assamaese Language. But it is a different language having its own vocabulary and grammar. Some of them speak a dialect of Bengali. The people who speak the Deshi (Goalpariya dialect) are called Ujanee or Deshi people. Though religiously the Dehsis (Ujanee) and Bengali Muslims belong to the same group, there are a lot of differences between these two groups. Deshis are the indigenous people who were converted time to time from the local indigenous groups like Koch, Rajbongshi, Mech, Jogi, Rabha, Napit, Fisherman, Kalitas etc. The Deshis claim that they are the offsprings of Ali Mech. Ghoti and Tribal people, who are very few in number have also contributed to the culture of the district. The men of the district wear pants, paijamas and kurtas as their traditional garments, while the women wear sarees.

== Transport ==
=== Airway ===
Nearest airport at Rupshi which is about 72.8 km (45.2 mi) away from the headquarter Hatsingimari . It was constructed during World War II by the British Govt. mainly for military purpose. Till 1983, the Indian Airlines and some private commercial flights operated regularly between Calcutta, Guwahati and Dhubri. Now it is totally closed. However, recently the ministry of DONER, GOI, has taken some initiative to renovate and functionalise the airport.

=== Waterway ===
The town had a very busy river port on the bank of the Brahmaputra, which was used as an international trade centre with the neighbouring countries, especially in the British era. At present, the port is lying idle. However, small ferries transport people to and from Dhubri every day.

=== Railway ===
There is no Railway station in the district.

=== Road ===
There is no National Highway in the district. Transportation takes place through state maintained pwd roads, which are full of potholes. Hatsingimari is in the centre place in the District while one part of Hatsingimari town is attached with Assam-Meghalaya border. There is no PWD road between South Salmara and Mankachar. only overland communication from South Salmara to Mankachar is Fulbari–Singimari road through Meghalaya.

== Town ==
Mankachar is the only town in the District other than the district capital.

== Villages ==
- Charbari
- Fekamari
- Hatsingimari
- Kokradanga
- Pipulbari Pt III
- Hazirhat
- Patakata
- Kakripara
- Chengurchar
- Borokalia Nashkara
- South bhurakata
