= AH48 =

Road in Asia

Asian Highway 48

Route information
- Length: 276 km (171 mi)

Major junctions
- South end: Changrabandha (India/Bangladesh Border)
- North end: Thimphu

Location
- Countries: India, Bhutan

Highway system
- Asian Highway Network
← AH47	→ AH51

Asian Highway 48 or AH48 is a transnational route in India and Bhutan, running 276 kilometres (171 mi) from Changrabandha in India to Thimphu in Bhutan.

== India ==
India/Bangladesh border at Changrabandha to Jaigaon at India/Bhutan border.

- NH 717 Changrabandha - Mainaguri
- NH 27 Dhupguri - Mainaguri
- NH 517 Gairkata - Dhupguri
- NH 17 Birpara - Gairkata
- NH 317 Birpara - Hasimara
- NH 317A Hasimara - Jaigaon

== Bhutan ==
India/Bhutan border at Phuentsholing to national capital Thimphu. AH48 is also the national highway number given for this route.

== See also ==
- AH2
- List of Asian Highways
