= National Highway 517 (India) =

National Highway in India

National Highway 517
- Map of National Highway 517 in red

Route information
- Auxiliary route of NH 17
- Part of AH48
- Length: 17.2 km (10.7 mi)

Major junctions
- North end: Telipara Morh near Gairkata
- South end: BoB Morh, Dhupguri

Location
- Country: India
- States: West Bengal

Highway system
- Roads in India; Expressways; National; State; Asian
← NH 17	→ NH 27

National Highway 517 (NH 517) is a national highway in India, running from Gairkata to Dhupguri in the state of West Bengal. It is a secondary route of National Highway 17. This route was earlier part of old national highway 31. This national highway is also part of Asian Highway 48.

== Route ==
NH517 connects Telipara Morh near Gairkata and Dhupguri in the state of West Bengal.

== Junctions ==
NH 17 Terminal near Gairkata.
NH 27 near Dhupguri.

== See also ==
- List of national highways in India
- List of national highways in India by state
