= Kokradanga =

- Village
- Interactive map of Kokradanga

Population
  - Total: 600
- Time zone: +5:30
- Postal code: 783128

Kokradanga is a village in South Salmara-Mankachar District, Assam, India.

== About Kokradanga ==
According to the census of 2011, the location code or town code of Kokradanga pt III village is 28166. Kokradanga pt III village is located in Mankachar tehsil of South Salmara-Mankachar district in Assam, India. It is situated 3 km away from district headquarters Hatsingimari. Hatsingimari is district headquarters of South Salmara-Mankachar. As per 2009 status, Borairalga is the gram panchayat of Kokradanga pt III Village.
