= Sevoke =

Town near Siliguri, West Bengal, India

- town
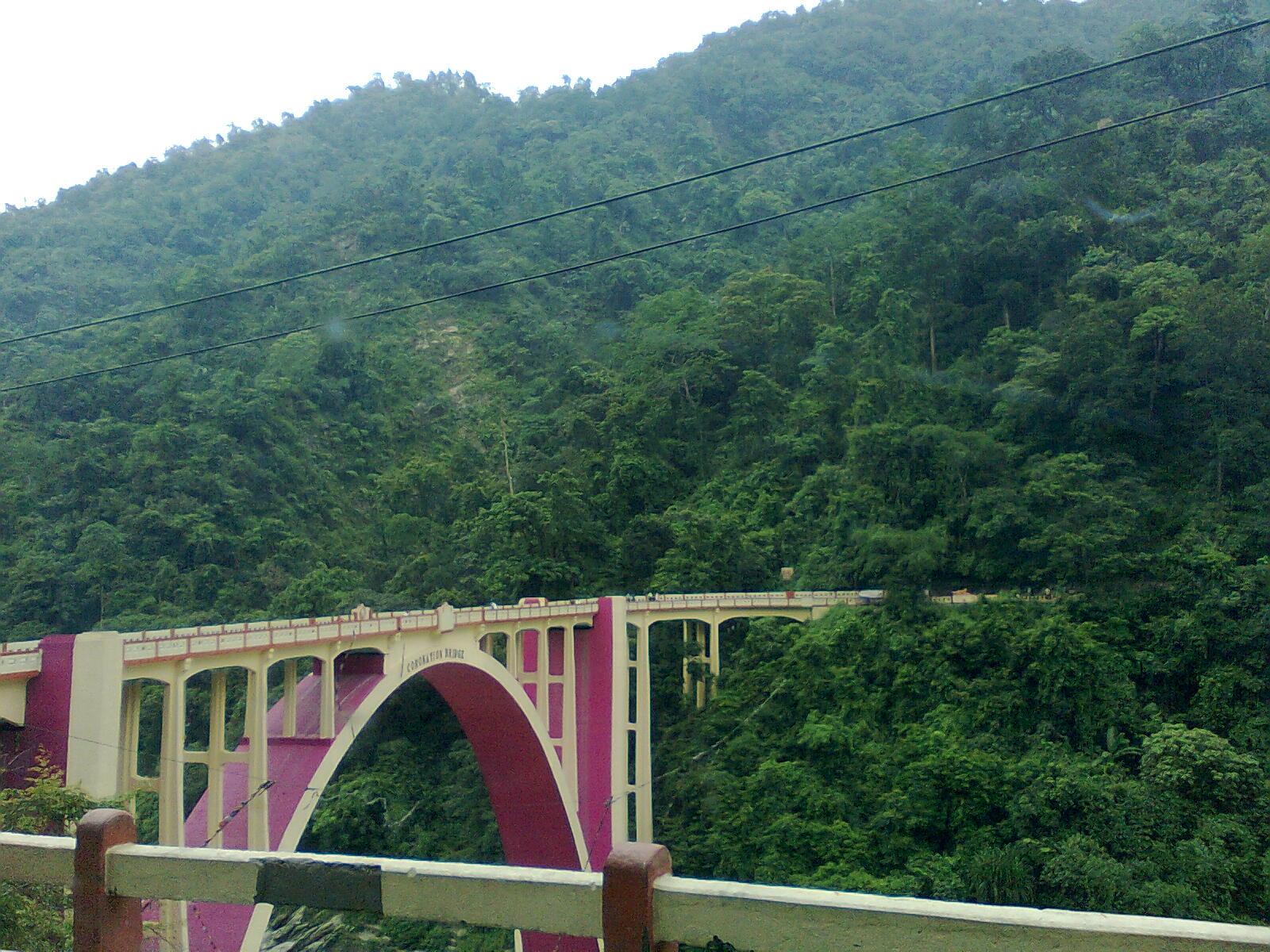
- Coronation Bridge over Teesta in Sevoke

- Location in West Bengal, India Sevoke (India)
- Coordinates: 26.880°N 88.471°E
- Country: India
- State: West Bengal
- District: Darjeeling
- Time zone: UTC+5:30 (IST)
- Lok Sabha constituency: Darjeeling
- Vidhan Sabha constituency: Kurseong
- Website: darjeeling.gov.in

Sevoke (also Sevok or Sivok) is a town near Siliguri in the Darjeeling district of West Bengal state of India near the border with Sikkim state. Situated in Dooars, Sevoke lies on the bank of River Teesta and has two bridges − namely Coronation Bridge and Sevoke Railway Bridge over it. Indian Army and Border Security Force camps are located in the area. The Mahananda Wildlife Sanctuary is situated in this area. National Highway NH10 passes through the town and connects Sevoke town to Gangtok and Siliguri. National Highway 17 originates from Sevoke near Coronation Bridge and terminates in Guwahati.

== Geography ==
Places and tea estates in the north-eastern portion of Darjeeling Sadar subdivision (including Rangli Rangliot CD block) and Kurseong subdivision in Darjeeling district
CT: census town, R: rural/ urban centre, N: neighbourhood, H: hill centre, NP: national park/ wildlife sanctuary, TE: tea estate, TA: tourist attraction
Abbreviations used in names – TG for Tea Garden (town/village), TE for Tea Estate
Owing to space constraints in the small map, the actual locations in a larger map may vary slightly

=== Location ===
Sevoke is located at 26.897°N 88.473°E'

=== Area overview ===
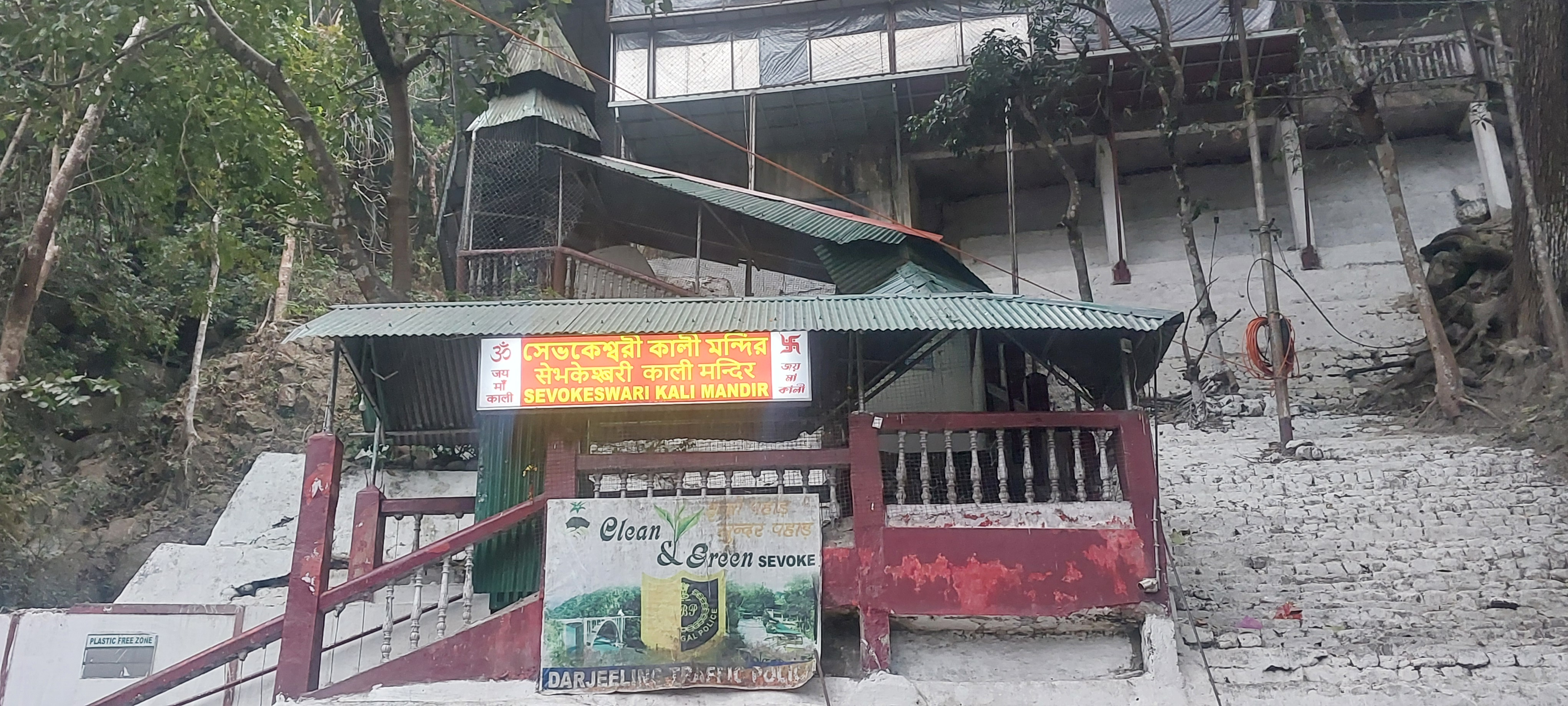
Sevokeshwari Kali Temple

The map alongside shows the eastern portion of the Darjeeling Himalayan hill region and a small portion of the terai region in its eastern and southern fringes, all of it in the Darjeeling district. In the Darjeeling Sadar subdivision 61.00% of the total population lives in the rural areas and 39.00% of the population lives in the urban areas. In the Kurseong subdivision 58.41% of the total population lives in the rural areas and 41.59% lives in the urban areas. There are 78 tea gardens/ estates (the figure varies slightly according to different sources), in the district, producing and largely exporting Darjeeling tea. It engages a large proportion of the population directly/ indirectly. Some tea gardens were identified in the 2011 census as census towns or villages. Such places are marked in the map as CT (census town) or R (rural/ urban centre). Specific tea estate pages are marked TE.

Note: The map alongside presents some of the notable locations in the subdivisions. All places marked in the map are linked in the larger full screen map.

== Transport ==
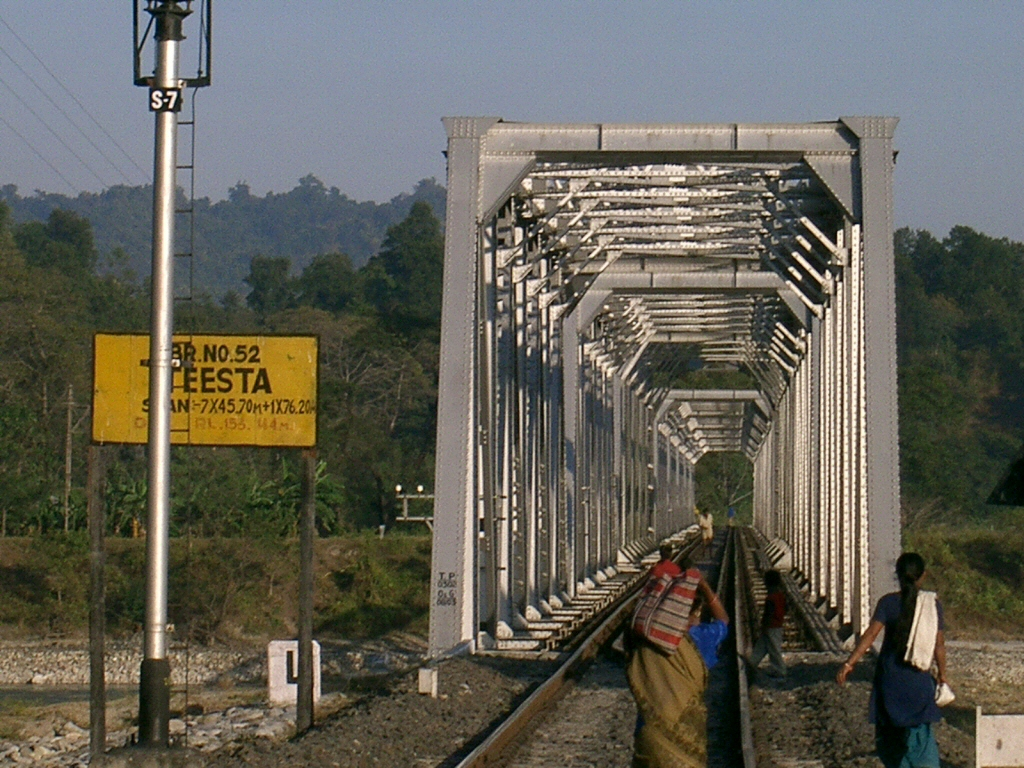
Sevoke Railway Bridge across River Teesta.

Sevoke Junction lies on the New Jalpaiguri–Alipurduar–Samuktala Road line and Sivok–Rangpo line from where some important trains like Sikkim Mahananda Express, New Jalpaiguri Alipurduar Tourist Express, Siliguri Bamanhat Intercity Express, Siliguri–Alipurduar Intercity Express alongwith many local trains are available. The nearest major railway junctions are Siliguri Junction - 25 km, Malbazar Junction - 33 km and New Jalpaiguri - 35 km. Sevoke-Rangpo Railway Line originates from Sevoke. The nearest airport is the Bagdogra Airport 29 km away.

Sevoke is located on the way to Gangtok, Sikkim, Kalimpong and Doars on the NH 10 from Siliguri.

It is a hill station with green hills, flora, fauna (mainly monkeys) and a number of viewing points.

== New railway line ==
The new Sivok–Rangpo railway line, 44 km long, will provide access to Gangtok in Sikkim.

The foundation stone for construction of a new railway line from Sevoke railway station (station code SVQ) to proposed Rangpo railway station on the border of Sikkim and West Bengal was laid in October 2009 by the vice president of India. In 2008, the line was proposed to be 53 km long with 5 ft 6 in (1,676 mm) broad gauge track but the final alignment is 45 km long with 3.5 km in Sikkim state and the rest in West Bengal state. The track will have 28 bridges and 14 tunnels and 38.5 km of the track will be in tunnels. The track is due to be constructed through the foothills of the Kanchanjungha mountain range and the Teesta river valley. New railway stations will be constructed at Melli, Teesta Bazaar, Geil Khola, Riang, and Rangpo.

The Indian Railways signed a contract with the construction company, IRCON, only in May 2010 but the final alignment had not been fixed for the first 22 km through elephant sanctuary forest even in 2013 and the final clearance of environment ministry had not been received. To obtain approval of the environment and forest ministry, the railways made a proposal in February 2013 to install elephant sensors along the stretch of the proposed railway line in Mahananda elephant sanctuary or run the trains at a speed of only 20 km per hour in the forest area and stop when an elephant is sighted close to the track. People of two villages in East Sikkim, through which a 3.5 km stretch of the 45 km long railway line has been planned, had not agreed to give their land for laying the track. The project cost escalated from the estimated cost of Rs.13.4 billion in 2008 and construction of the railway line had not started even in 2018.

The Supreme Court of India approved the project in February 2016 with strict guidelines of the National Wildlife Board that cleared the project in June 2015 but ordered restricted speed, wireless animal tracking sensors and allowed digging of tunnels only during daytime. The railway line is needed for security and socio-economic reasons. The railway line will help troops and armaments move faster towards the Indo-Tibet border. Railway Board chairman visited and met the Northeast Frontier Railway (NFR) officials on 2 March 2018 to discuss the commencement of construction of the track and tunnels.

- Estimated cost: Rs.1,340 crore in 2008.
- Length of final alignment: 44.98 km
- Stations en route: Riang, Gailkhola, Tista Bazaar, Melli
- Nearest junction: New Jalpaiguri (30 km from Sevoke through Siliguri)
- Route under tunnels: 38.53 km (86%)
- Number of bridges: 28
- Number of tunnels: 14
- Longest tunnel: 5.1 km
