= Sivok Junction =

Railway station in West Bengal, India

Sivok
- View of Sivok railway station

General information
- Location: National Highway 10, Sevoke, Darjeeling district, West Bengal; India
- Coordinates: 26.8806°N 88.4689°E
- Elevation: 156 metres (512 ft)
- System: Indian Railways station
- Owner: Indian Railways
- Operator: Northeast Frontier
- Lines: New Jalpaiguri–Alipurduar–Samuktala Road line; Sivok–Rangpo line
- Platforms: 2
- Tracks: 4

Construction
- Structure type: At grade
- Parking: Yes
- Cycle facilities: No

Other information
- Status: Open (construction – new line)
- Station code: SVQ
- Zone(s): Northeast Frontier Railway
- Division(s): Alipurduar
Location
- Location within West Bengal Location within India

Sivok Junction also known as Sevoke Junction is a junction railway station in Darjeeling district, West Bengal. Its code is SVQ. The station serves Sevoke town. The station consists of two platforms. The station lies on New Jalpaiguri–Siliguri–New Mal Junction–Hasimara–Alipurduar Junction route under Alipurduar division of Northeast Frontier Railway. It is also the originating point of the Sevoke-Rangpo Railway Line which is under construction. This railway station is a scenic railway station as it falls under Mahananda Wildlife Sanctuary just ahead of Sevoke Railway Bridge over river Teesta.

== Trains ==
Some of the trains that has stoppages in Sevoke are:

- Delhi Junction - Alipurduar Mahananda Express
- New Jalpaiguri–Alipurduar Tourist Express
- Siliguri Bamanhat Intercity Express
- Siliguri–Alipurduar Intercity Express
- Alipurduar–New Jalpaiguri Passenger
- Bamanhat–Siliguri Passenger
- Siliguri-New Bongaigaon DEMU
- Dinhata–Siliguri DEMU
- New Cooch Behar–Siliguri Jn DEMU (via Changrabandha)
- New Jalpaiguri–Alipurduar Passenger

== New railway line from Sevoke to Rangpo ==
Sivok–Rangpo line, 44 km long line, will provide access to Gangtok in Sikkim.

The foundation stone for construction of a new railway line from Sevoke railway station to proposed Rangpo railway station on the border of Sikkim and West Bengal was laid in October 2009 by the vice president of India. In 2008, the line was proposed to be 53 km long with 1,676 mm (5 ft 6 in) broad gauge track but the final alignment is 45 km long with 3.5 km in Sikkim state and the rest in West Bengal state. The track will have 28 bridges and 14 tunnels and 38.5 km of the track will be in tunnels. Bridges over deep gorges and valleys will provide a scenic journey. The track is due to be constructed through the foothills of the Kanchanjungha mountain range and the Teesta river valley. New railway stations will be constructed at Melli, Teesta Bazaar, Geil Khola, Riang, and Rangpo.

The Indian Railways signed a contract with the construction company, IRCON, only in May 2010 but the final alignment had not been fixed for the first 22 km through elephant sanctuary forest even in 2013 and the final clearance of environment ministry had not been received. To obtain approval of the environment and forest ministry, the railways made a proposal in February 2013 to install elephant sensors along the stretch of the proposed railway line in Mahananda elephant sanctuary or run the trains at a speed of only 20 km per hour in the forest area and stop when an elephant is sighted close to the track. People of two villages in East Sikkim, through which a 3.5 km stretch of the 45 km long railway line has been planned, had not agreed to give their land for laying the track. The project cost has escalated from the estimated cost of Rs.13.4 billion in 2008 and construction of the railway line has not started even in 2018.

The Supreme Court of India approved the project in February 2016 with strict guidelines of the National Wildlife Board that cleared the project in June 2015 but ordered restricted speed, wireless animal tracking sensors and allowed digging of tunnels only during daytime. The railway line is needed for security and socio-economic reasons. The railway line will help troops and armaments move faster towards the Indo-Tibet border. Railway Board chairman visited and met the Northeast Frontier Railway (NFR) officials on 2 March 2018 to discuss the commencement of construction of the track and tunnels.

- Estimated cost: Rs.1,340 crore in 2008.
- Length of final alignment: 44.98 km
- Stations en route: Riang, Gailkhola, Tista Bazaar, Melli
- Nearest junction: New Jalpaiguri (30 km from Sevoke through Siliguri Junction)
- Route under tunnels: 38.53 km (86%)
- Number of bridges: 28
- Number of tunnels: 14
- Longest tunnel: 5.1 km
