= Sevoke Railway Bridge =

Railway Bridge in West Bengal

Coordinates: 26.8813°N 88.4752°E

Sevoke Railway Bridge is the railway bridge on River Teesta near Mahananda Wildlife Sanctuary at Sevoke, West Bengal, India. The railway bridge is about 396.1 metres long and connects Darjeeling district with Jalpaiguri district of West Bengal. The bridge lies on New Jalpaiguri–Alipurduar–Samuktala Road line of Northeast Frontier Railway, Alipurduar Division.

It connects Siliguri - Sevoke to the Doars region of North Bengal. Sevoke Railway Bridge runs parallel to Coronation Road Bridge over Teesta. This bridge is located just ahead of Sivok railway station towards New Malbazar Station.

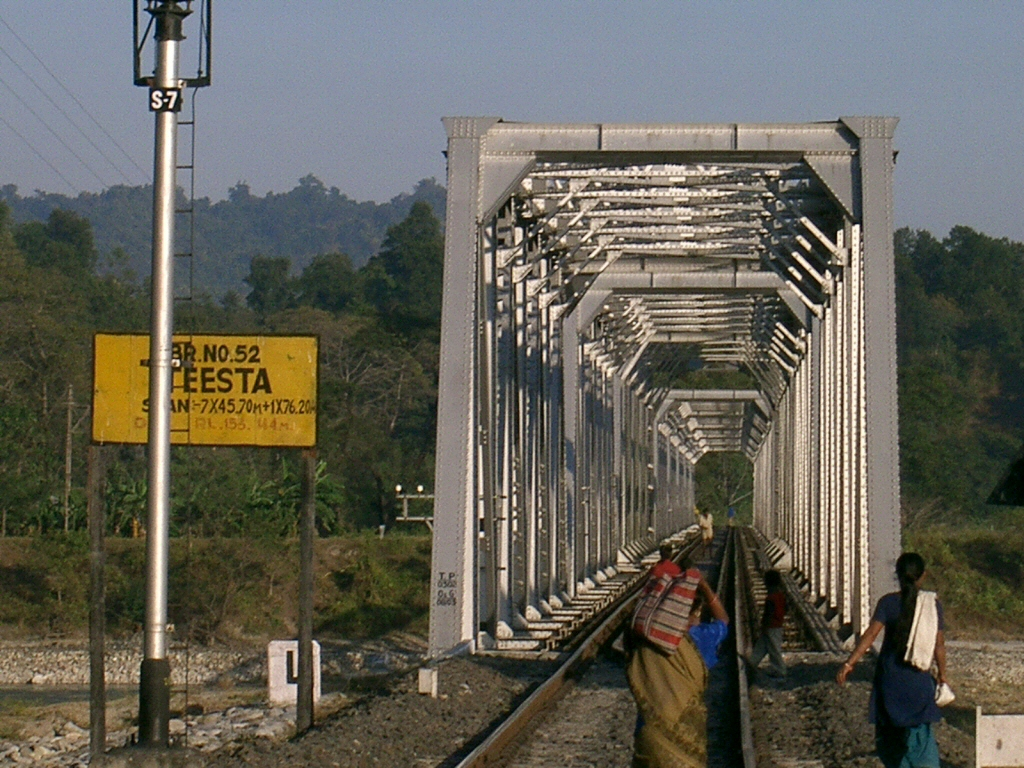
Sevoke Railway Bridge across River Teesta.

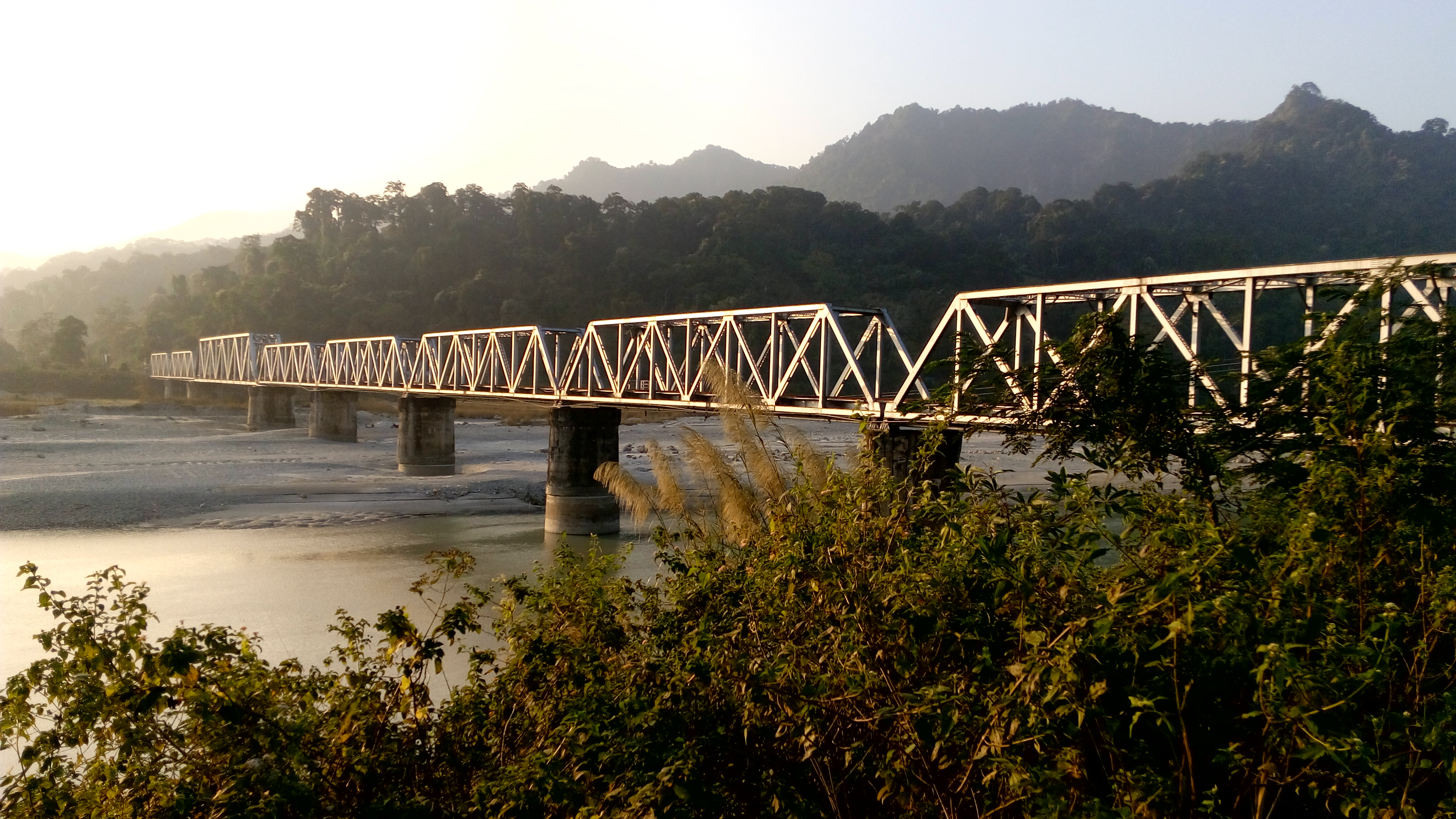

In June 2016 there were some cracks in the pillar of this bridge due to heavy rainfall in Sikkim and North Bengal, and it was closed for a few weeks for repair.
