= National Highway 117A (India) =

National highway in India

National Highway 117A
- Map of the National Highway in red

Route information
- Length: 47 km (29 mi)

Major junctions
- South end: Bilasipara
- North end: Garubhasa

Location
- Country: India
- States: Assam
- Primary destinations: Kokrajhar

Highway system
- Roads in India; Expressways; National; State; Asian
← NH 17	→ NH 27

National Highway 117A, commonly called NH 117A is a national highway in India. It is a spur road of National Highway 17. NH-117A traverses the state of Assam in India.

== Route ==
Bilasipara - Kokrajhar - Garubhasa.

== Junctions ==
NH 17 Terminal near Bilasipara.
NH 27 Terminal near Garubhasa.

== See also ==
- List of national highways in India
- List of national highways in India by state
