= Charbari =

Charbari Gazarikandi
- Village in Assam
- Location in Assam, India Charbari (India)
- Coordinates: 25.66135°N 89.89123°E
- Country: India
- State: Assam
- District: South Salmara Mankachar

Government
  - Type: Democratic
  - Body: Indian Government
  - MP: Rakibul Hussain (INC)
  - District Commissioner: Shri.Rahul Kumar Gupta, IAS
  - Superintendent of Police: Shri Horen Tokbi, APS
  - MLA: Adv. Aminul Islam (AIUDF)
  - Gaon Prodhan: Smti. Shakila Honufa Banu Sarkar

Population (2011 census)
  - Total: 2,924

Languages
  - Official: Assamese
- Time zone: UTC+5:30 (IST)
- Pin Code: 783135; 783131
- Vehicle registration: AS-34

Charbari (Gazarikandi) is a village under Kathalbari and Kukurmara Gaon panchayat in Mankachar revenue circle, South Salmara-Mankachar district of Assam a north east state of India.

== Politics ==
Charbari is the part of Dhubri (Lok Sabha constituency) whose present MP is Rakibul Hussain, INC. (as per 2024 elections). And Charbari is included Mankachar (Vidhan Sabha constituency) of the Assam Legislative Assembly, whose present MLA is Adv.Aminul Islam, AIUDF. (as per 2021 elections).

== Education ==
- Kukurmara Higher Secondary School, Charbari
- Navorashmi Girls High School
- Model Academy, Charbari
- Medulla Jatiya Vidyalaya, Charbari
- Ismart Academy, Charbari
- Green View Jatiya Vidyalaya, Charbari
- Charbari L.P & M.E School
- Gazarikandi L.P School

== Hospitals ==
- Gazarikandi Block Primary Health Care

== Market ==
- Hasinur Rahman Book Store, Charali
