= Kakripara, Assam =

Kakripara
- Village
- Location in Assam, India Kakripara (India)
- Coordinates: 25.53°N 89.87°E
- Country: India
- State: Assam
- District: South Salmara Mankachar

Government
  - Deputy Commissioner: Smti.Pallavi Sarkar, IAS
  - Superintendent of Police: Sri Subodh Kumar Sonowal, APS
  - MLA: Adv Aminul Islam, AIUDF

Area
  - Total: 5.67 km^{2} (2.19 sq mi)

Population (2011)
  - Total: 9,370
  - Density: 1,650/km^{2} (4,280/sq mi)

Languages
  - Official: Assamese
- Time zone: UTC+5:30 (IST)
- PIN: 783131
- ISO 3166 code: IN-AS
- Vehicle registration: AS-34
- Literacy: 44.6%

Kakripara is a village in South Salmara-Mankachar District in the Indian state of Assam. It is situated at the extreme south-westernmost end of North-East India near to the Bangladesh–India border.
