= National Highway 317 (India) =

National Highway in India

National Highway 317
- Map of National Highway 317 in red

Route information
- Auxiliary route of NH 17
- Part of AH48
- Length: 75.1 km (46.7 mi)

Major junctions
- North end: Tellipara Morh, Birpara, West Bengal
- NH 317A Hasimara
- South end: Salsabari Morh, Salsabari, West Bengal

Location
- Country: India
- States: West Bengal

Highway system
- Roads in India; Expressways; National; State; Asian
← NH 17	→ NH 27

National Highway 317 (NH 317) is a National Highway in India. This highway runs entirely in the state of West Bengal. It is a secondary route of National Highway 17. This route was earlier part of old national highway 31C. Birpara to Hasimara stretch of this national highway is part of Asian Highway 48.

== Route ==
NH317 connects Telipara Morh at Birpara, Madari Hat, Hasimara, Rajabaht Khawa and Salsabari Morh at Salsabari in the state of West Bengal. This the fastest route to travel between Birpara & Abhayapuri than National Highway 17 (India).

== Junctions ==
NH 17 Terminal near Birpara.
NH 317A near Hasimara
NH 27 Terminal near Salsabari.

== See also ==
- List of national highways in India
- List of national highways in India by state
