= Agomani =

Agomoni
- Sub-divisional Town
- Agomani, Agamani, Agomoni
- Location in Assam, India Agomoni (India)
- Coordinates: 26°11′56″N 89°47′06″E
- Country: India
- State: Assam
- District: Dhubri
- Established: 15th century

Area
  - Total: 9 km^{2} (3.5 sq mi)
- Demonym: Agomanian

Languages
  - Official: Assamese
- Time zone: UTC+5:30 (IST)
- PIN: 783335
- ISO 3166 code: IN-AS
- Vehicle registration: AS 17

Agomani (also spelt as Agomoni or Agamani) is a sub town area of Dhubri district (Assam) India. It is an area on the bank of Gangadhar River with historical significance. Agomani stands in a town area. The area of Agomani is about 9 km^{2} Agomani is situated at a distance of 50 km to the North West of Dhubri, 12 km to the South of West Bengal border and 8 km to the North East of Bangladesh border. National Highway 17 passes through Agomani from North to South and the historical Gohain Kamal Ali (Road) runs from East to West. Both the roads crossed it the heart of Agomani. At the conjunction, there is a daily market and shops of all kinds are established. In 1963 a terrible Cyclone blew over Agomani and swept away many houses, lives and properties and the name of Agomani appeared on Newspaper, Radio & T.V and Agomani had been known to all over Assam.

== History ==
Agomani is an important place with some historical background. It is situated in the district of Dhubri (Assam). There are some sayings about the origin of the name of AGOMANI. Agomani derives from the word "AGOMAN"which means arrival. It is said that Mahapurush Sri Sri Shankardeva, the great preacher of the Bhagawati Bhaishnava faith, made a voyage from Pathbaushi with his niece Aai Bhubeneshwari to get her marriage with Chillarai, the brother of Nara Narayana, the king of Koch kingdom. They made a journey by boat on the river Ganghadhar. Both of them arrived at Agomani Ghat and received each other. From that time the place was named Agomani. Later Shankardeva and Chilarai came to Satrasal where marriage ceremony of Aai Bhubeneshwari with Chilarai was performed. (which is controversial) There are other sayings that Raja Probhat Ch. Baruah, the Jamindar of Gouripur and Maharaja Nara Narayana, the King of Koch kingdom arrived at the place of Agomani to meet and to settle some disputes overland. To commemorate that historical meeting, the place has been known as Agomani.

== Demographics ==
Agomani is a thickly populated area. Most of the inhabitants are cultivators. There are some service holders and Business men also. Cultivators produced rice, jute, wheat, vegetable and other agricultural crops. But the economic condition of the general people of Agomani is good. This is due to the fact that most of the people belong to the backward classes. Residences of Agomani are mostly Hindus and Muslims. They are peace-loving people and have been living in communal harmony and peace since long ago. There was no record of communal disturbances at Agomani. Sheelbhadra the famous Assamese writer, wrote a novel namely "AGOMANIR GHAT" which made Agomani well known.

== Facilities ==
There are several Govt. Offices and Institutions are in and around Agomani these are – A.S.O and Circle Office, B.D.O and CIC Office, S.D.O ASEB Office, Post Office, Courier Facilities - DTDC Express, Delhivery, Ecom Express, Handloom and Textile Office, S.O, P.W.D Office, Telephone Exchange, P.H.C. and Hospitals, UCO Bank, State Bank Of India, Bandhan Bank, Lower Assam Public School, Pragati College, Agomani H.S. School, Agomani J.B. School, Girls high and M.E. School, Indoor Stadium, Basketball Court, and Agomani Mini Stadium etc. These offices and Institutions increased the importance of Agomani and It is going to form a small town-ship. There is a big Bi-Weekly market at a distance of half a kilometer to the West called kaldoba haat (market). It is a business place. The Gangadhar river flowing towards the Brahmaputra is at a distance of half a kilometer to the east to the Agomani. The famous "Agomani Ghat" is still surviving.

== Educational institutes ==
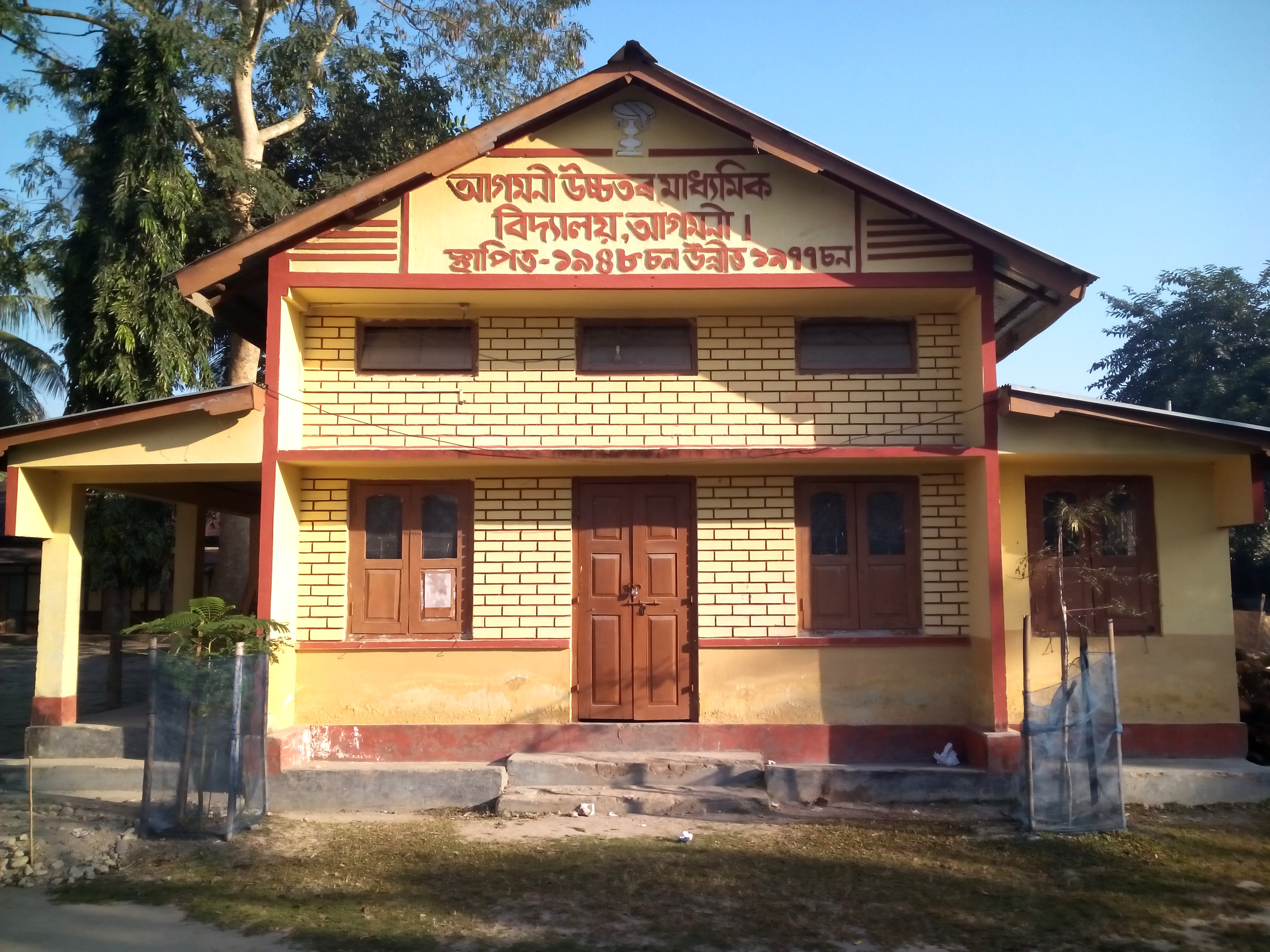
Agomani Higher Secondary School

Educational institutions of Agomani are :

- Pragati College is premier college in Dhubri District.
- Agomani Higher Secondary School; Founded in 1948 and Provincialised in 1977.
- Lower Assam public School, Agomani (Private) CBSE
- 1476 No. Agomani J.B. School; Established in 1947.
- 1967 No. Bangla L.P. School; Established in 1971,
- Kaldoba J.B. School (Private); Established in 1985,

Agomani Junior College, Agomani; Established in 2018

- Sankardev shishu aru Bidya Niketan, Kaldoba Agomani (Shishu Shikha Samiti Assam, Guwahati)
- Agomani Girls' M.E. School; Established in 1972,
- Agomani Girls' High School (Private); Established in 1980,
- Agomani Jatiya Vidyalaya (private);
- Gurukul Adarshya Vidyalaya, Agomani (private) Digital school,
- Dhubri Pollytechnic, Agomani it was sanctioned,
- Shernagar Jatiya Vidyalaya (private) Agomani,
- Chilarai Academy, Agomani an english medium school (private)

== Transport ==
Agomani has a railway station named Agomani railway station. Two trains runs via this station. One train (Rajya Rani Express) runs three days in a week and another Train runs daily from Dhubri to New Jalpaiguri (Siliguri) (Inter City Express) via Agomani town.

Agomani has a small bus stand. Air port facilities are available in the distance of 34.9 km named Rupshi Airport and 14.9 km distance from the district head quarter Dhubri Town.

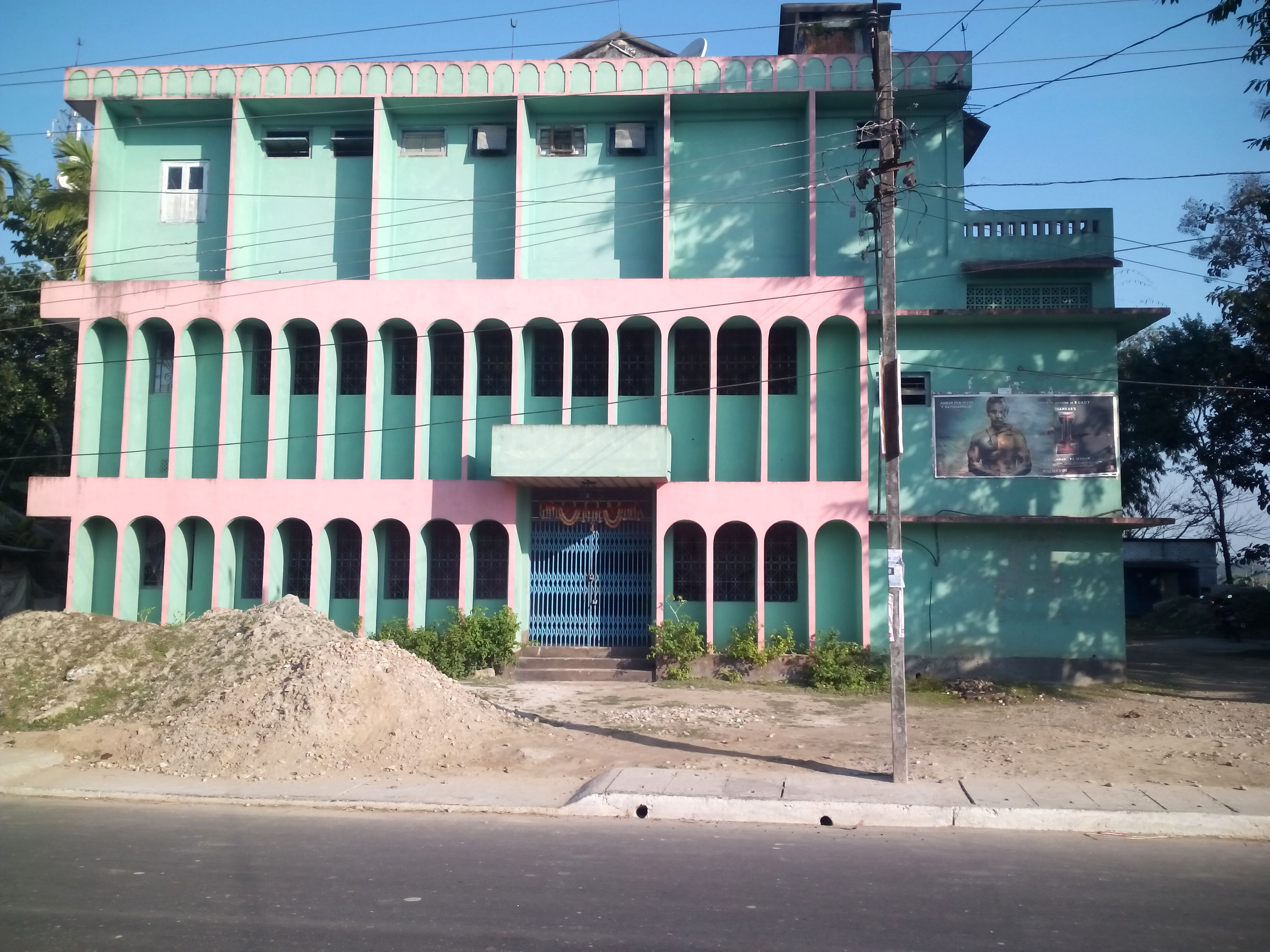
Talkies in Agomani Town
