= Golokganj =

- town
- Location in Assam, India Golokganj (India)
- Coordinates: 26°06′17″N 89°49′31″E
- Country: India
- State: Assam
- District: Dhubri
- Elevation: 58 m (190 ft)

Population (2011)
  - Total: 16,000

Languages
  - Official: Assamese
  - Regional: Koch Rajbongshi
- Time zone: UTC+5:30 (IST)
- ISO 3166 code: IN-AS
- Vehicle registration: AS

Golokganj (also spelt as Golakganj or Galakganj) is a census town in Dhubri district in the Indian state of Assam. Golakganj is one of the historical places of Dhubri district.

== Geography ==
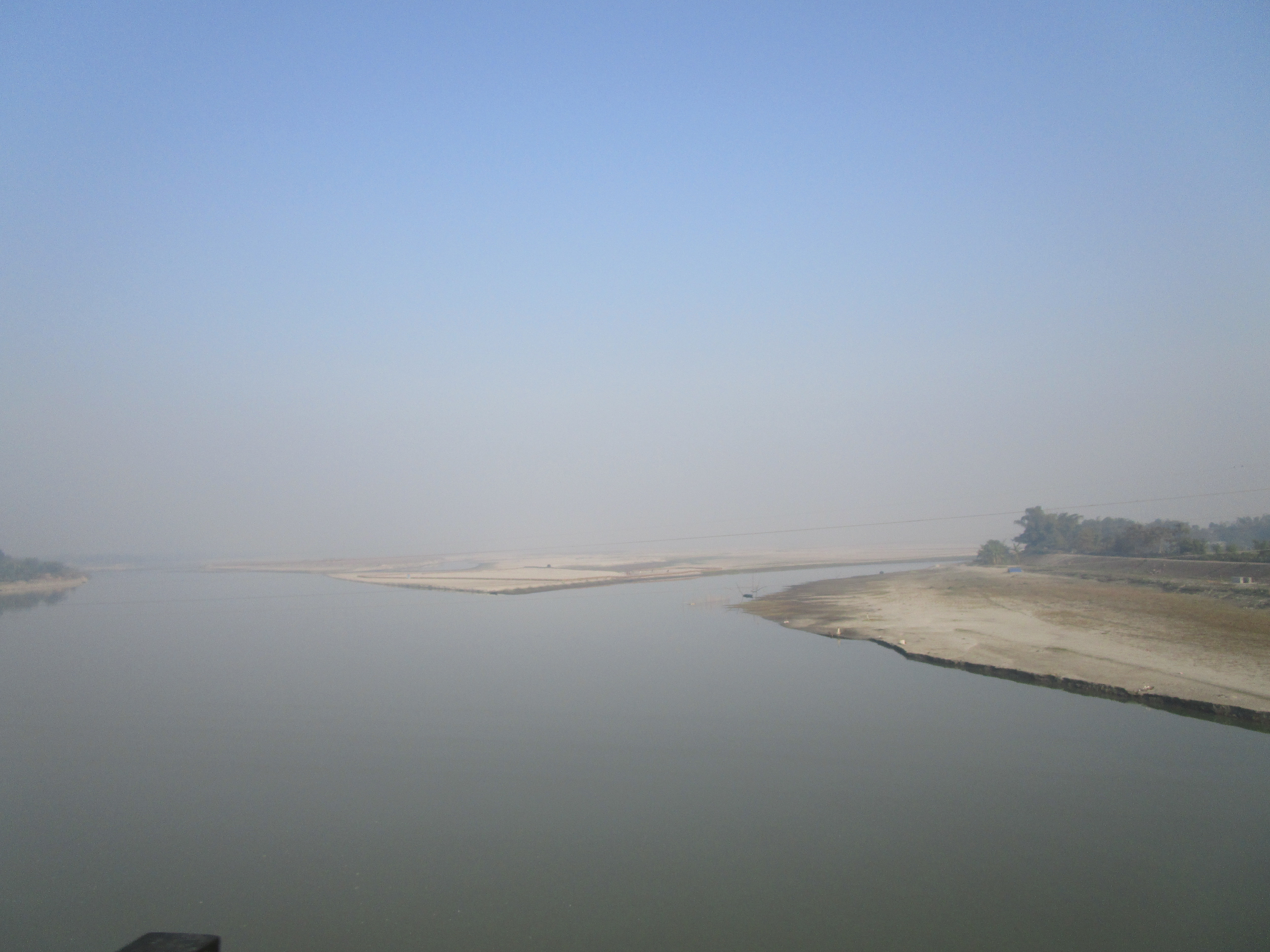
Gangadhar River at NH31 near Golokganj

Golakganj is located at 26.10°N 89.83°E. It has an average elevation of 45 m (148 ft). Golakganj is situated 20 km from the district headquarters. Golakganj is situated on the east bank of Gangadhar River and the Indo-Bangladesh border is almost 5 km. away from heart of the place.

== Demographics ==
As of 2001 India census, Golokganj had a population of 7612. Males constitute 54% of the population and females 46%. Golokganj has an average literacy rate of 63%, higher than the national average of 59.5%: male literacy is 69%, and female literacy is 55%. In Golokganj, 13% of the population is under 6 years of age. Commonly spoken language is Goalparia.

== Transport ==
There is an old railway-cum-road bridge (unused) constructed by the British government in 1901 under the inspection of British Engineers. Golokganj railway station is situated in the heart of Golakganj town which was constructed before the East Bengal Partition of 1905 by the British. There is the facility for online reservation of railway tickets. Railway services were resumed from 2011 and currently daily intercity trains between Guwahati and Dhubri, between Siliguri and Dhubri, another between Bongaigaon and New Jalpaiguri are plying. Also a tri weekly train between Silghat in Nagaon and Alipurduar in West Bengal are plying.Nearest airport named Rupsi airport is 15 km away from Golakganj town. Buses from Coochbehar, Siliguri and Guwahati are well connected from Golakganj town.

== Education ==
There is an arts college named Chilarai College which was established in the year 1973.Now this college is upgraded to university and first university in dhubri district is going to held in golakganj town.There is a Basic Training Centre (TC) and a DIET centre, imparting professional training to fresh and in-service teachers. Physical infrastructure of a proposed Industrial Training Institute (ITI) had already been created and classes would be starting soon. There is a girls residential school Kasturba Gandhi Balika Vidayala. Further there is Chinmoi High School, Jagamohan Vidypeeth Higher Secondary School, Sankardeva Sishu Vidya Niketan, Jatiyo Vidyalaya and Rahamatganj High School.

== Politics ==
Golakganj is part of Dhubri (Lok Sabha constituency). The name of the constituency of Golakganj is 25th Golakganj LAC. Present MLA of Golakganj LAC is Shri. Ashwini Roy Sarkar the Bharatiya Janata Party .

§ International Trade Center: Government of India recently started Intentional Trade Center at Lakhimari (the Indo-Bangladesh border) which is situated on the west bank of Gangadhar River and about 4 km from Golakganj Town.
