= Bilasipara =

Town in Assam, India

Bilasipara is a town, sub-division and town area committee in Dhubri district in the state of Assam, India.

== Geography ==
Bilasipara is located at 26.23°N 90.23°E. It has an average elevation of 26 metres (85 feet).
