= National Highway 303 (India) =

National highway in India

National Highway 303
- National Highway 303 displayed in red

Route information
- Auxiliary route of NH 3
- Maintained by NHAI
- Length: 70 km (43 mi)

Major junctions
- North end: NH 154 in Nagrota
- NH 503A, Bhota
- South end: NH 3 in Naduan

Location
- Country: India
- States: Himachal Pradesh
- Primary destinations: Daulatpur, Ranital, Jawalamukhi

Highway system
- Roads in India; Expressways; National; State; Asian
| ← NH 103 | → NH 503 |

National Highway 303, commonly referred to as NH 303, is a highway connecting the city of Nagrota Bagwan to Nadaun in Himachal Pradesh.

| Highway Number | Source | Destination | Via | Length (km) |
|---|---|---|---|---|
| 303 | Nagrota Bagwan | Nadaun | Daulatur - Ranital - Jawalamukhi | 60 |
