= Bhagat Baba Kalu =

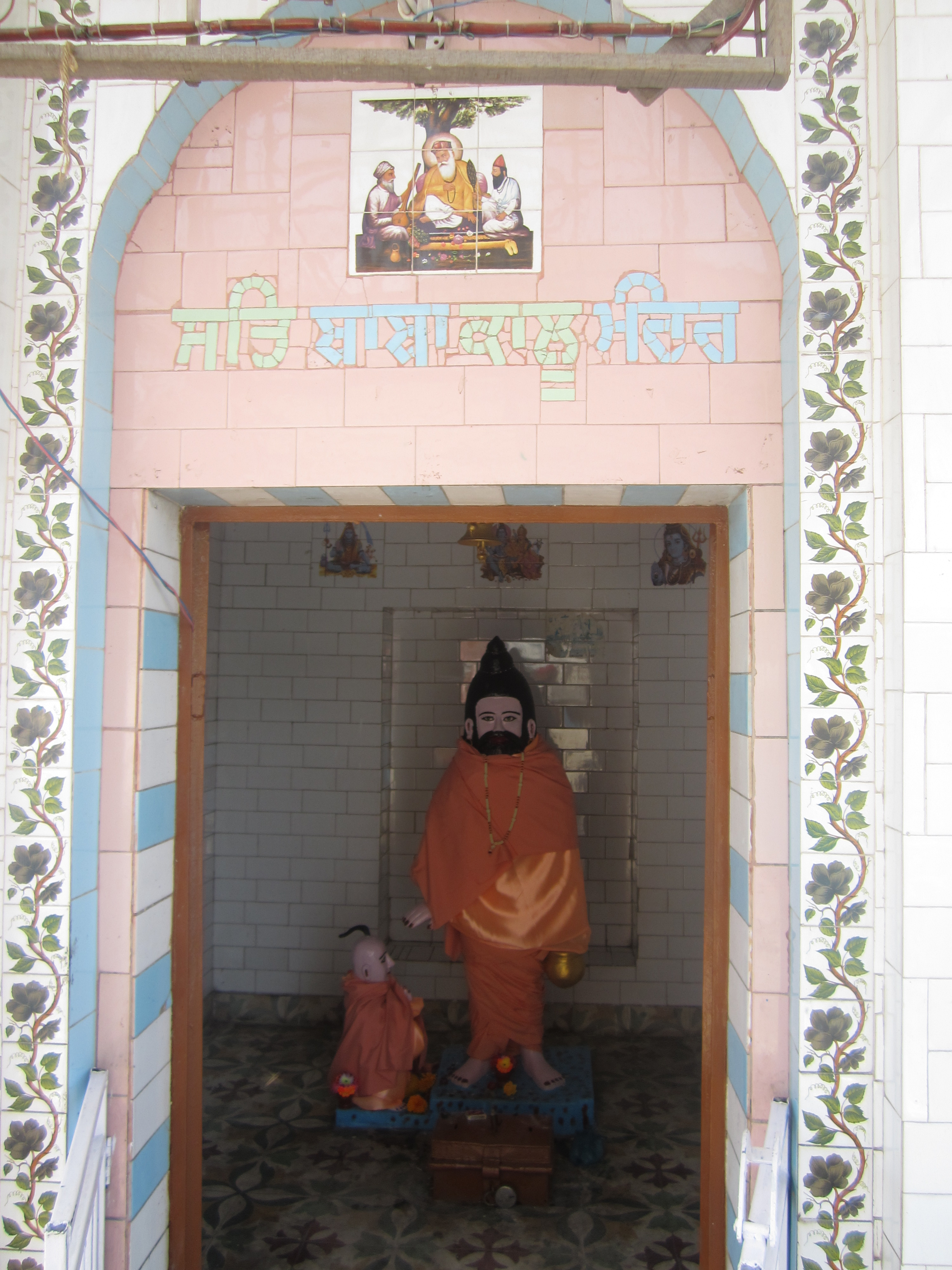

Personal life
- Born: 16th - 17th Century Barial, Hoshiarpur, Punjab, India
- Died: Panch Nangal, Hoshiarpur, Punjab, India
- Region: Punjab
- Known for: Bhagat, Religious Teacher

Religious life
- Religion: Hinduism/ Sikhism
- Founder of: Kalupanth

Senior posting
- Disciples: Lachhmi Chand, Sri Chand, Megh Chand, Tara Chand

Bhagat Baba Kalu is a local Bhagat revered by the people of the Hoshiarpur and Phagwara areas within Punjab, India.

== History ==
Bhagat Baba Kalu was born in the village of Barial, located in Hoshiarpur district, during medieval India. Baba Kalu belonged to the Hindu Jhir community. He was of the Manauti surname and had two sons: Ganesha and Mehesha. The latter left issue who are styled Bawas and live in the villages of Panshta, Barial, Panch Nangal, Khutiar and Kahnpur.

Baba Kalu had four disciples: Lachhmi Chand, Sri Chand, Megh Chand, and Tara Chand, among whose descendents a priest is elected. He spent his final days in the village of Panch Nangal near the village Khushalpur in Hoshiarpur, where his wooden sandals are still kept. Baba Kalu is regarded as the founder of Kalupanth. Kalu Baba's devotees, known as Kalupanthis, come from the adherents of Hindu and Sikh religion.

== Festivals ==
The main shrine of Baba Kalu is located in village of Panshta (also known as Panchhat).The shrine in Panshta hosts the annual Baisakhi Mela. A representative of the shrine travels to the villages that attend the Mela to gather contributions.

People from several villages attend the mela including people from the adjoining villages of Narur and Jalwehra as well as people from Lakhpur and Sahni. Annual processions commemorating the birth anniversary of Baba Kalu are held in various regions of northern India especially Punjab, Haryana and Uttar Pradesh.

== Photo gallery ==
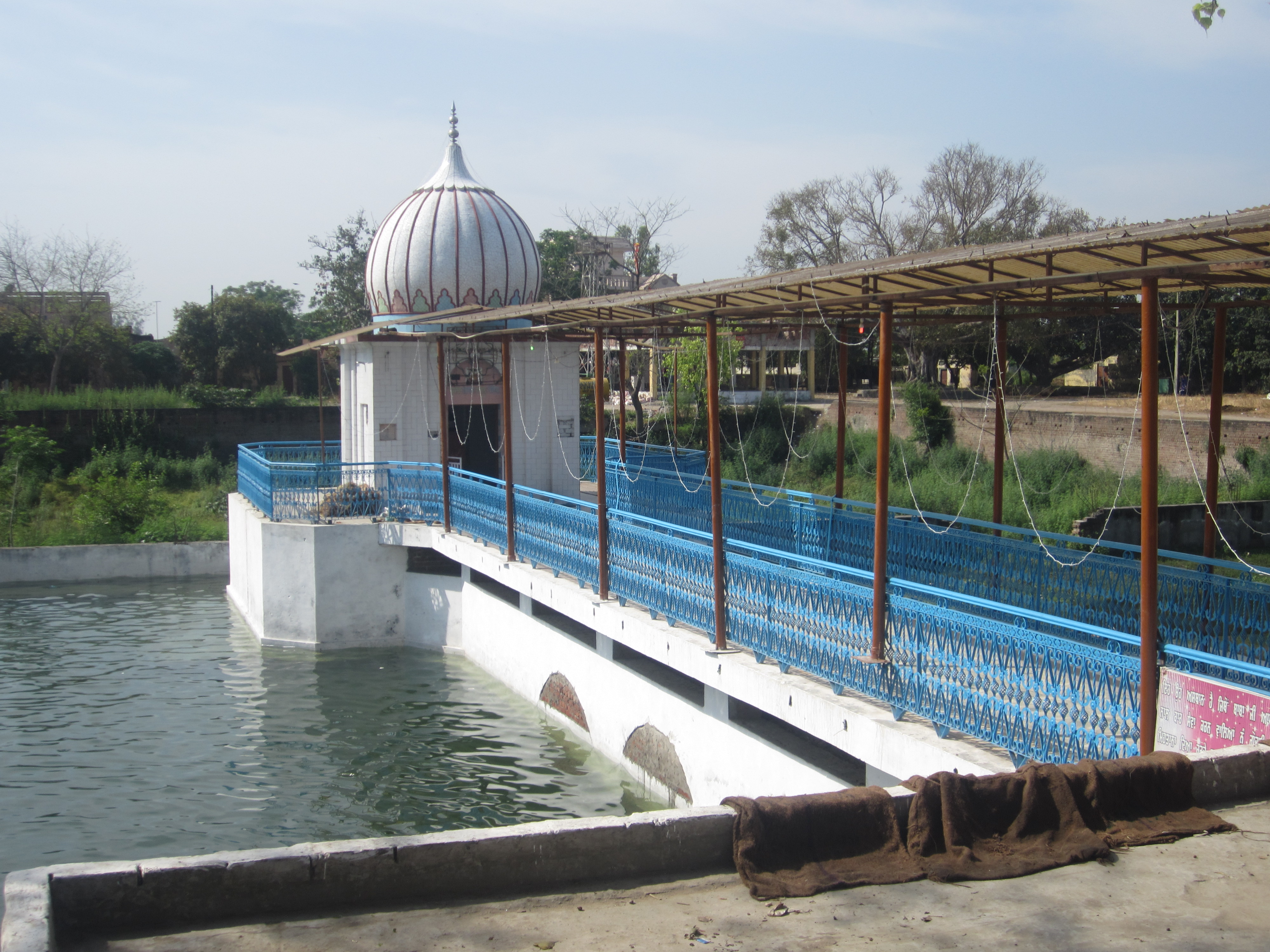
Shrine of Bhagat Baba Kalu Ji Panchhat

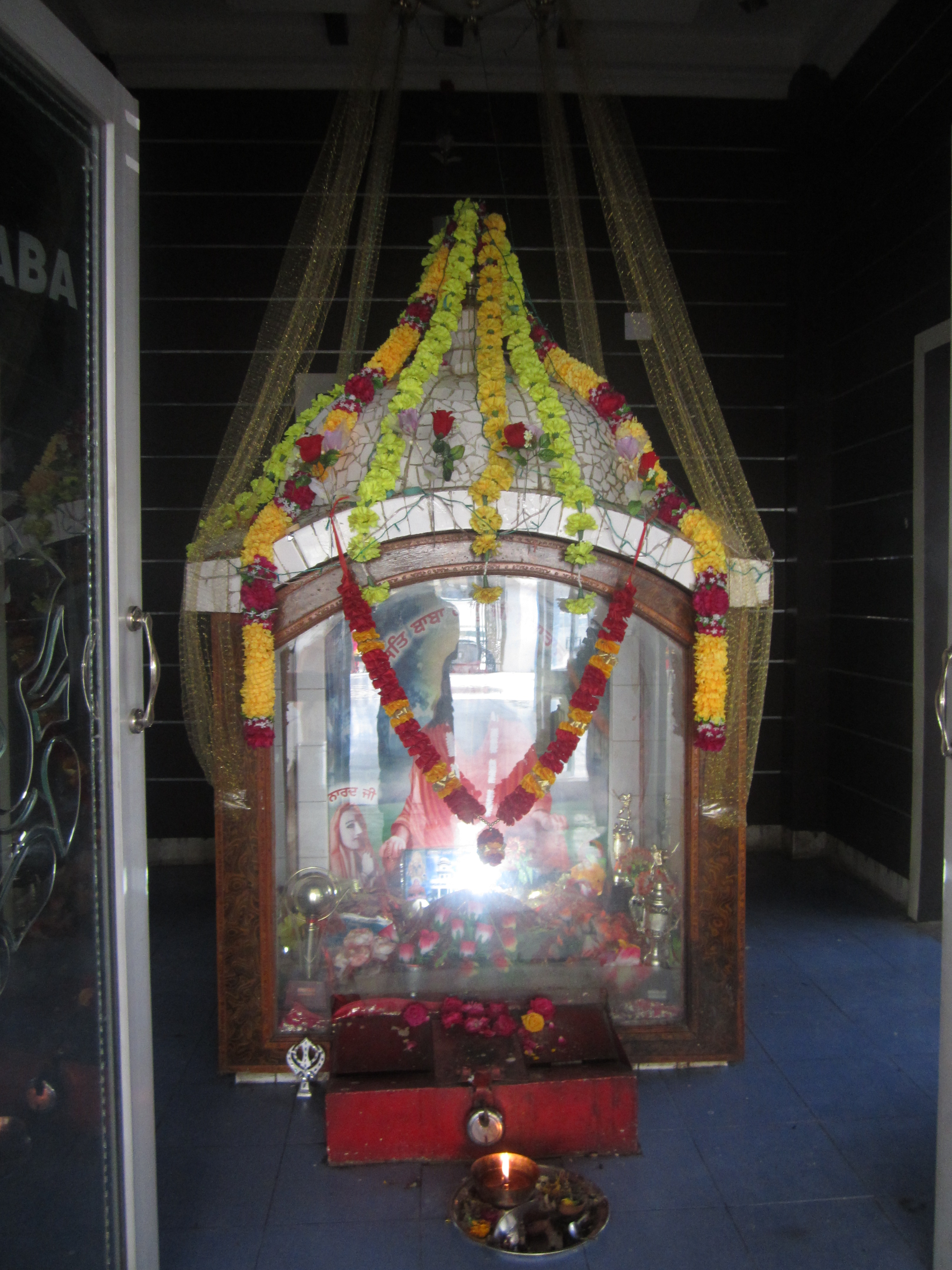
Shrine of Bhagat Baba Kalu Ji
