= Panj Khand =

Sikh metaphysical realms

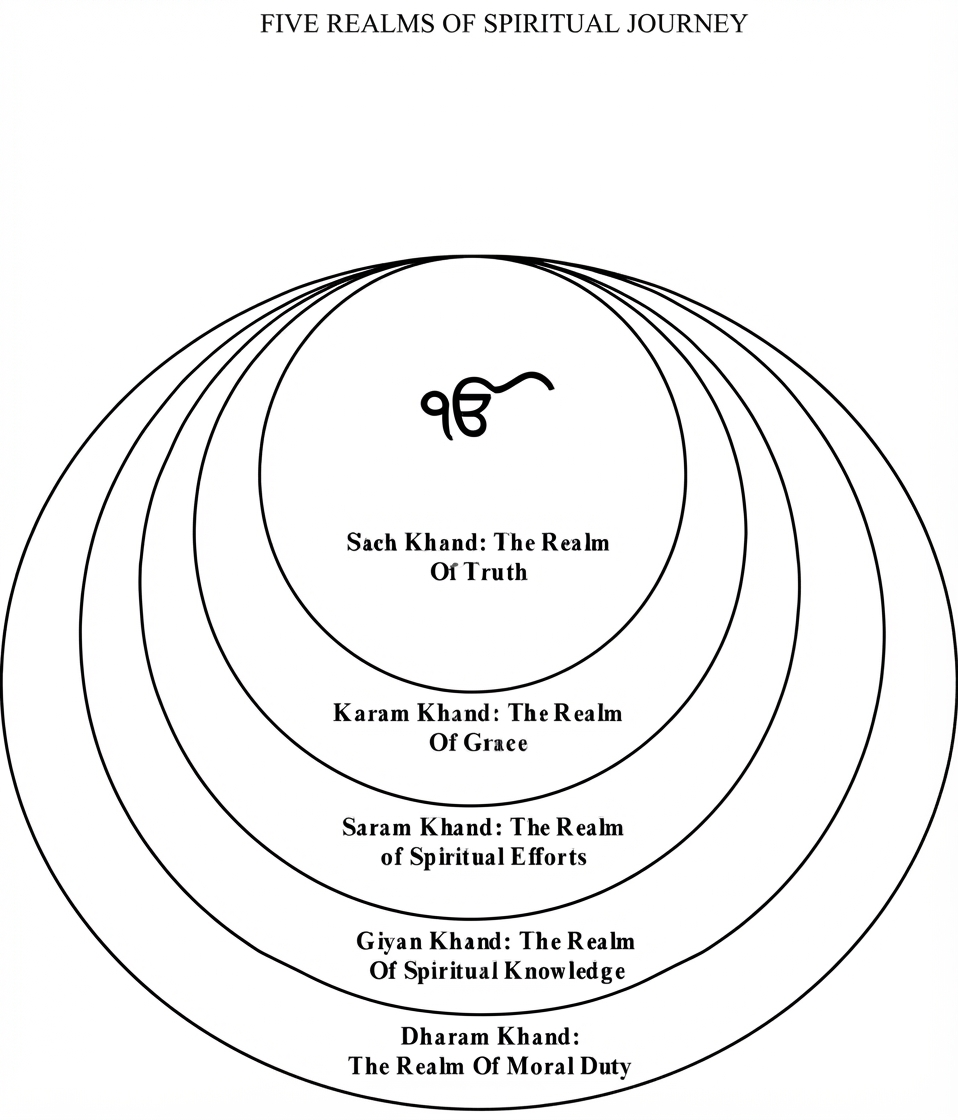
Panj Khand (Five Realms) of Sikhism

Panj Khand (Gurmukhi: ਪੰਜ ਖੰਡ, pañj khaṇḍ, meaning "five realms" or "five stages") is a Sikh theological concept of there being five spiritual realms. The stages are believed to be how the human mind and being progresses spiritually toward enlightenment and supreme truth, culminating in a state of unity with divinity.

== Etymology ==
The word pañj means "five" while khaṇḍ denotes "region" or "realm".

== Concept ==
According to W. H. McLeod, the concept may have been influenced by the Sufis or hatha yoga, with the khands replacing the chakkars of the Naths. According to Louis E. Fenech and Pashaura Singh, the theory is a uniquely Sikh concept, not occurring in other religious traditions or texts. The philosophical framework of five realms was established by Guru Nanak in his Japji Sahib composition in stanzas (pauri) 34 to 37, with the theory not being referenced elsewhere in Sikh scripture aside from there. Rather than being geographical locations, they are metaphysical concepts and symbolic. Progressing through the stages requires the practice of naam simran. The five spiritual realms are:

1. Dharam Khand (ਧਰਮ ਖੰਡ): Realm of Righteousness – consisting of moral duty. It is the realization that the world has a divine meaning and that everything will be judged ultimately, tying with justice and duty. Dharam is a physical and moral cause and effect, consisting of all life, the celestial bodies, and four elements (air, water, fire, and earth), with a sort of retributive, divine justice prevailing. This stage is described as dharti dharamsal ("place of earning righteousness") by Nanak. Guru Arjan suggests reflection and meditation on the divine name and good conduct, allowing one to life a spiritual life despite earning wealth and partaking in society.
2. Gyan Khand (ਗਿਆਨ ਖੰਡ): Realm of Knowledge – consisting of intellectual awakening. It is insight and awareness is acquired of the inner-workings of reality and the expanse of the universe, with all knowledge being sourced to the creator, causing the seeker to be humbled and awed (vismaya/vismād). Depicted as an epiphany of light, one's sense of individuality is shattered through the realization of the nature and grandness of existence, becoming attuned to the divine word (nada). The knowledge gained is considered superior to scientific or rational knowledge, being a sort of ultimate or divine knowledge of the essence and connectedness of the cosmos and existence. The glory and expansiveness of creation is described as kete kete ("many, many") and kaii kot ("many millions") by the gurus in their writings.
3. Saram Khand (ਸਰਮ ਖੰਡ): Realm of Effort or Aesthetics – described as a personal transformation. Further divine grace, discipline, and cultivation of the conscious (surati) is required to extinguish the ego so that the person can experience more beyond emotions, leading to intellect and wisdom. This involves the maximization of the human mind and capabilities, becoming an eternal yet temporal, mystical-heroic figure, all with reliance on the shabad. The qualities nurtured are initially surat (consciousness), then after mat (reason), man (mind), budhi (discernment), and finally sudh (understanding). This allows the gurmukh to have darshan of Akal Purakh and be in agreement with hukam.
4. Karam Khand (ਕਰਮ ਖੰਡ): Realm of Grace – characterized by divine grace. Through effort and perseverance of the individual and spiritual favour, the evils are vanquished, there is a cessation of dualism and experience of bliss, accompanied by further divine grace leading to spiritual liberation. Persons (described with the moniker bhagat or brahmgiani) of this level, having completely tamed their inner-self and remain constantly in remembrance of divinity, are described as martial and heroic who do not err and are not bound by samsara, being liberated while alive (jeevan-mukt), remaining in the presence of the like-minded. Adjectives used to describe them include kind, detached, pure, humble, and patient, with the ability to bless and inspire others to also progress spiritually.
5. Sach Khand (ਸਚ ਖੰਡ): Realm of Truth – a state of ultimate truth. It is described as being impossible to explain in words but can only be experienced, this is the realm where the Nirankar divine resides and the source of hukam and state of liberation, it is the highest point of consciousness or being, being a singularity of essence with a unifying force. There is no longer any individuality left, just an overwhelming oneness. However, many Sikhs conceptualize Sach Khand not as a mystical state transcending death, but as a "heavenly abode"—a place where one's spirit goes after death.

Each stage involves a person's consciousness, consisting of emotions, actions, and thoughts. Rather than describing each stage in an reclusive or ascetical manner, Guru Nanak describes them in the context of partaking in society. The journey to each stage is described as pavaṛīāṅ, which are ladder rungs. The first step in spiritual advancement as per Sikhism is gaining control over desire via discipline. This allows one to further advance through divine grace. Then, remembrance of naam is required and the realization of God's hukam is what guides everything. Progressing beyond Dharam Khand requires endurance, composure, and restraint. Experiencing the Anhad Shabad (unstruck sound) is the marker for being in Gian Khand. The nature of the third and fourth stages remains debated. The concept is linked to Panch Parvan, with the number five being common in Sikhism.

== See also ==
- Maqam (Sufism)
- Ashtanga (eight limbs of yoga)
- Kosha
- Bhūmi (Buddhism)
