= Phandak =

Religious figure

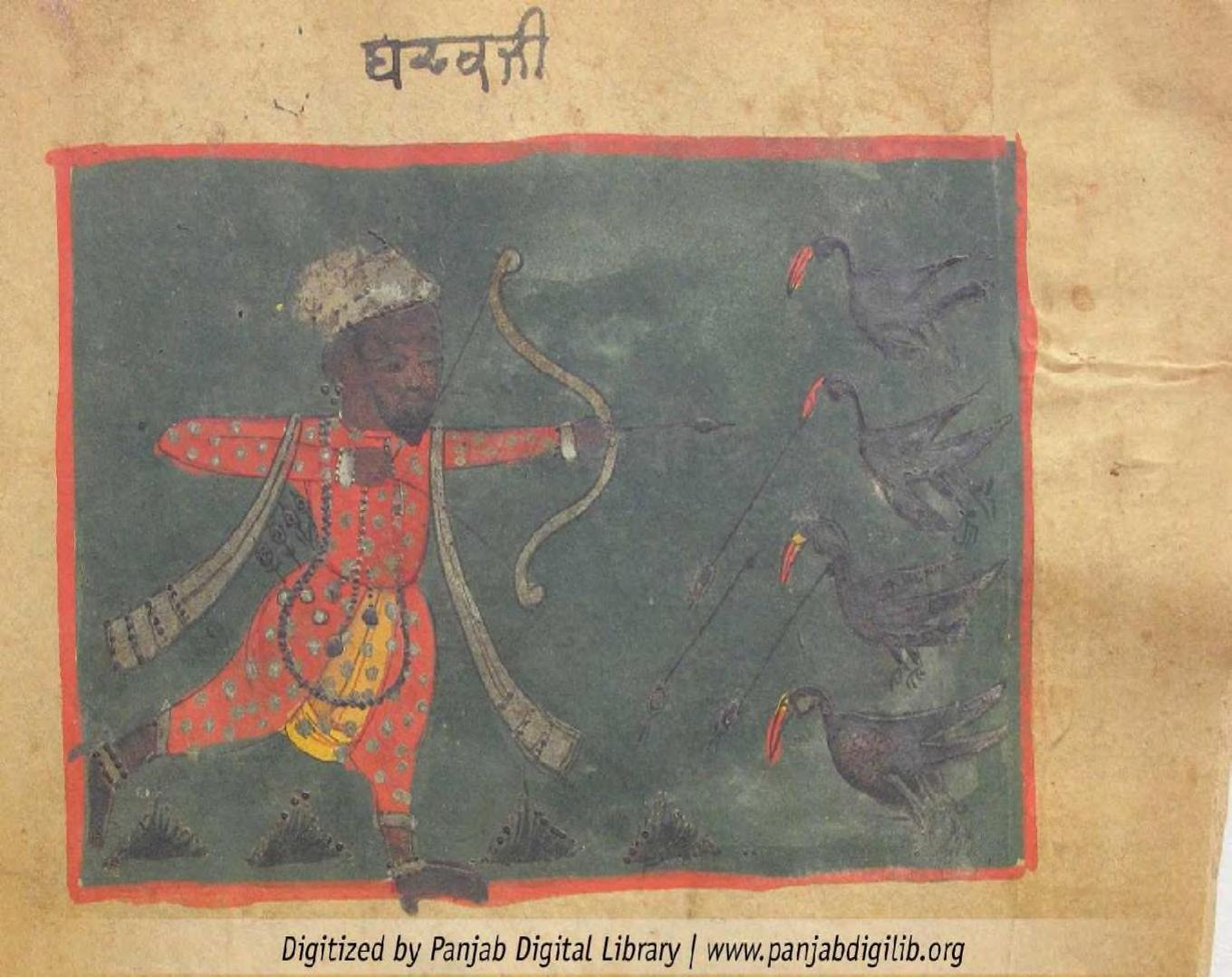
Painting of Bhagat Phandak, from a folio within an illustrated manuscript of the Prem Ambodh Pothi

Phandak (meaning "hunter"), also spelt as Badakh, was an obscure bhagat. The Sambhu Granth, a version of the Guru Granth Sahib observed by H. H. Wilson at Varanasi in 1832, contained hymns attributed to him. According to Louis E. Fenech, Phandak was a Nirgun sant, of which a single hymn attributed to him is found in one recension of the Guru Granth Sahib. He may have been a militant/armed ascetic who resided in the Varanasi region in the 17th–18th centuries. He is not to be confused with the character Jara Phandak from the Mahabharata. However, Pashaura Singh was not able to locate any hymns attributed to Phandak in any extant Guru Granth Sahib manuscript. Himmat Singh, one of the original Panj Piare of Sikhism was believed to be his reincarnation (avtar).
