= Dehlan, Himachal Pradesh =

Dehlan Lower
- village
- Location in Himachal Pradesh, India Dehlan Lower (India)
- Coordinates: 31°25.42′N 76°20.06′E
- Country: India
- State: Himachal Pradesh
- Elevation: 397 m (1,302 ft)

Languages
  - Official: Punjabi
- Time zone: UTC+5:30 (IST)
- Postal code: 174306
- Vehicle registration: HP- HP-20 & HP-72
- Coastline: 1,409 kilometres (876 mi)
- Una: Una, Himachal Pradesh
- Lok Sabha constituency: Hamirpur
- State Assembly constituency: dehalanUna
- School: Govt. Sr. Sec. School Dehlan

Dehlan Lower, is a village located in Una district of the Indian state of Himachal Pradesh. Recently, Dehlan was adopted by Shri Anurag Singh Thakur, the sitting Member of Parliament from the Hamirpur seat under Sansad Adarsh Gram Yojna.

== Geography ==
Dehlan is the largest village of Himachal Pradesh. It is two kilometers from the border of the Punjab district of Ropar. The village has sub-divisions: Dehlan, Upper Dehlan, and Lower Dehlan, including बड़ैहार, Kuhi, चिलैआल, Johorowal, and Pakhubela. Bashar has its own panchayat (village council). Upper Dehlan and Lower Dehlan have separate village councils. Johorowal and Kuhi (including Pakhubela) also have separate panchayats. Overall, these villages have five panchayats. When Una was part of the Hoshiarpur district, it was the largest village of the Punjab. After separation, it became a part of Himachal Pradesh. Dehlan is situated near Una, Dharamshala, Mandi, Hamirpur and other places in Himachal Pradesh. The village is divided in two Gram Panchayats, namely Lower Dehlan and Upper Dehlan.

Dehlan is located 2 kilometres (1.2 mi) from the Himachal Pradesh/Punjab Mehatpur border.

== Demographics ==
The main castes in the village include the Baheti/Choudhary, Jatt, Tarkhan, Brahmin, Lohar, Chamar, Jheer, and Nai. The village also has a small Muslim community. The language and culture of the village is Punjabi.

Dehlan village has a population of 1,140, of which 549 are males while 591 are females, as per the 2011 Census of India.

There are eight temples and six gurdwaras in the village. Additionally, some other isolated temples are there which are not recorded.

The main occupation of the village is agriculture.

== Transport ==
National Highway 503 Extension passes through this village.
