= Himmat Singh (Sikhism) =

Sikh martyr (1661–1705)

Bhai / Pyare Himmat Singh Ji
- ਹਿੰਮਤ ਸਿੰਘ
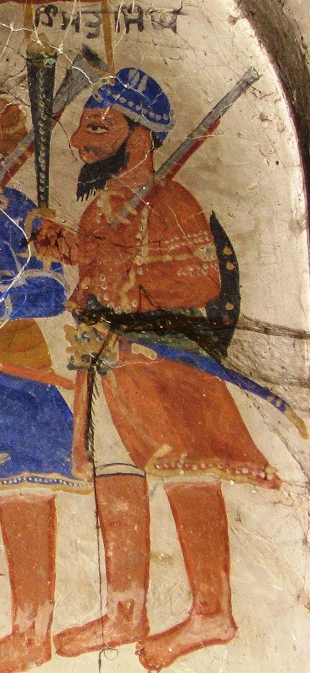
- Himmat Singh, depicted in an Sikh fresco, inside a Sikh samadhi located in Kot Fateh Khan, Attock, Punjab, Pakistan

Panj Pyare
- In office 1699 – 1704 or 1705

Personal life
- Born: Himmat Rai; 1661 Jagannath Puri, Odisha, India
- Died: 7 December 1704 or 1705 (aged 43 or 44) Chamkaur, Punjab, India
- Cause of death: Killed in action
- Parents: Gulzari (father); Dhanno (mother)
- Known for: Member of the original, inaugural Panj Pyare
- Occupation: Water Carrier

Religious life
- Religion: Sikhism
- Institute: Khalsa

Bhai Himmat Singh (1661–1705), born as Himmat Rai, was one of the inaugural group of Panj Pyare, or the first group of the Five Beloved in Sikhism.

== Biography ==
=== Early life ===
Bhai Himmat Singh was born in 1661 in Jagannath Puri in modern-day Odisha, India into the caste of water-suppliers. His family belonged to the Jhivar (also Jheer or Jheeaur) caste. His father was named Gulzari whilst his mother was named Dhanno.

=== Later life ===
Bhai Himmat Singh reached Anandpur at the age of 17 to serve the tenth Sikh Guru, Guru Gobind Singh. He was the third to answer the call by the Guru during the ceremony to formalize the Khalsa order in 1699 atop a hill in Anandpur, (where Takht Kesgarh Sahib now stands).

He received the vows of the Khalsa at Guru Gobind Singh's hands and was renamed Himmat Singh. At Anandpur, he took part in battles with the surrounding hill chiefs and imperial commanders. He died in the Battle of Chamkaur on 7 December 1704 or 1705. Himmat Singh was viewed as being an avatar of an obscure Bhagat named Phandak (hunter).

== Legacy ==
Bhai Himmat Singh Memorial Children Park was constructed by Sri Guru Nanak Dev Ji Religious & Charitable Trust in the memory of him. It is located in front of Gurdwara Aarti Sahib, Puri, Odisha.

== Bibliography ==
- Gurbilas Patshahi Das by Koer Singh Kalal in 1751, near-contemporary source for Bhai Himmat Singh's biography
- Guru Kian Sakhian by Bhai Swaroop Singh Kaushish in 1790, near-contemporary source for Bhai Himmat Singh's biography
- Gurbilas Patshahi Dasvi by Sukha Singh in 1797, near-contemporary source for Bhai Himmat Singh's biography
- Chhibbar, Kesar Singh, Bansavallnamd Dasdn Pdlshdhidn Kd. Chandigarh, 1972
- Santokh Singh, Bhai, Sn Gur Pratap Suraj Granth. Amritsai, 1927–33
