= Narur =

- Village
- Location in Punjab, India Narur (India)
- Coordinates: 31.334798°N 75.854588°E
- Country: India
- State: Punjab
- District: Kapurthala

Languages
  - Official: Punjabi
- Time zone: UTC+5:30 (IST)

Narur, also known as Naroor and sometimes Naror, is a large village in Punjab, situated 17 km from Phagwara. The area is 183 hectares with a population of 2485.

Neighbouring villages include Panchhat, Jalwehra, Bhagana, Randhirgarh, etc.

== Demographics ==
Narur residents are mostly Jaswal Sikh Rajputs, along with a sizable population of Adharmis, and a number of Brahmin and Muslim families.

== History ==
Narur is named after Nar Chand, one of the sons of Mian Mota, who was a Jaswal prince from the Punjab hills.

According to village folklore, Narur was founded by a Jaswal prince hailing from Amb, capital of Jaswan, which is located in present-day Himachal Pradesh. The prince was hunting in the area and fell in love with a local girl, said to be from a nearby village Ajnoha. The two eventually married and founded the village.

== Notable historical events ==
=== Peasant agitation against malba tax ===
As noted in the Kapurthala gazetteer of 1984, "In 1938-39, there was a peasant agitation against malba tax, which was being charged at the rate of six per cent of the land revenue. People refused to pay the tax and lambardars expressed their inability to do anything in the matter. The situation became quite grave at village Narur which was described as the storm centre of the agitation. The agitation won a partial victory when the Maharaja granted relief to the tune of rupees thirty thousand out of a total sum of rupees sixty five thousand."

It is told by the village elders that when the Kapurthala Maharaja sent his soldiers and tax collectors to Narur, the Jaswals threw rocks at them and fought them otherwise, as briefly hinted at above. The soldiers were pushed back and returned to Kapurthala without making any collections.

=== The Kisan Sabha protests against the Betterment Levy Tax of 1950s ===
In 1952, before the completion of Bhakra canal system, the Punjab Government armed itself with a legislation to impose betterment levy, with the aim of meeting all the expenditure on canal system through this tax. According to this legislation, the basis of this tax was to be fifty per cent of the increase in price of land due to the Bhakra canal irrigation system. There were protests throughout the state and hundreds of people were arrested in false cases of encounters with the police. On 10 March 1959, Pratab Singh Kairon, the Chief Minister of Punjab, made a statement in state assembly that the communists were trying to take over the state. The next day, on 11 March, police surrounded Narur, which was cited as one of epicenters of revolt, and started firing. Five people, including a woman, laid down their lives.

The Punjab government eventually failed to suppress the agitation and Pratap Singh Kairon came to Narur. In an effort to appease the villagers, the government opened the primary and middle schools in the village. Since then the villagers have held an annual mela in memory of the five shahids who gave up their lives.

== Main religious places ==
- Dhan-Dhan Shri Baba Yakh ji
- Dhan-Dhan Shri Baba Ghaha Singh Ji
- Daadi Mahastti ji ( Mahan Hasti)
- Gurdwara Nanga Sahib ji
- Gurdwara Shahid ganj
- Shri guru Ravidaas Gurdwara
- Lord Shiva Mandir
- A Muslim Dargaah
- Gurdwara Kalgidhar Sahib Ji
- Shri Baba Balak Nath Mandir
- Shri shirdi sai baba mandir
- Dera Rampura (Narur)
