= NH 88 =

NH 88 may refer to:

- National Highway 88 (India)
- New Hampshire Route 88, United States
