= National Highway 503 (India) =

National highway in India

National Highway 503
- Map of NH 503 in red
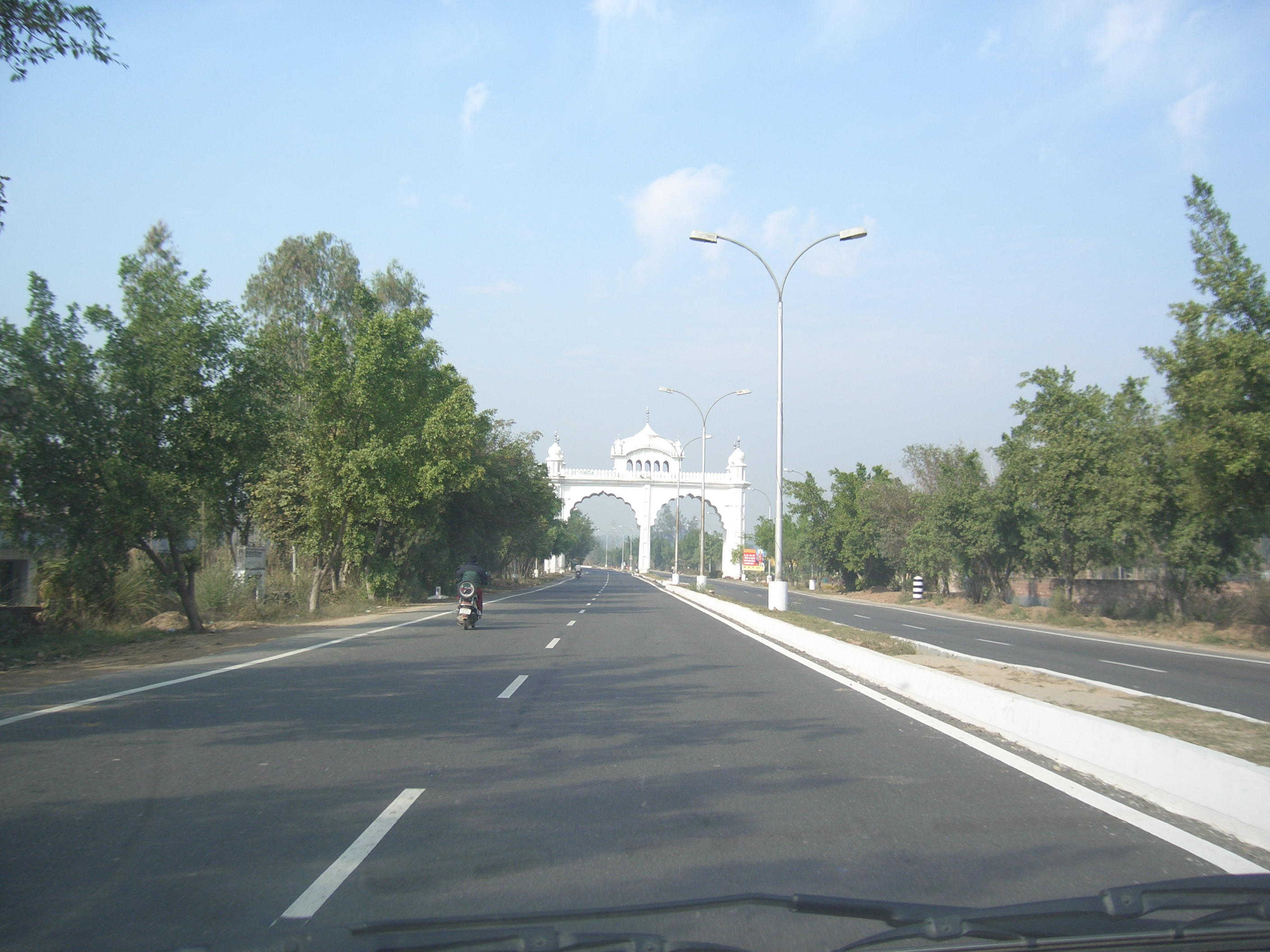
- Anandpur Sahib City gate

Route information
- Length: 181 km (112 mi)

Major junctions
- South end: Kiratpur
- North end: Macleodganj

Location
- Country: India
- States: Himachal Pradesh, Punjab
- Primary destinations: Una, Anandpur Sahib, Kangra, Mataur, Dharamshala

Highway system
- Roads in India; Expressways; National; State; Asian
← NH 205	→ NH 154

National Highway 503, commonly referred to as NH 503, is a highway connecting the city of Dharamshala to Mubarakpur in Himachal Pradesh. NH503 has been extended from Mubarakpur to Kiratpur in Punjab. The route of NH503 is extended from Mataur Kangra to Mcleodganj Dharamshala.

== Route ==
Highway Number	Source	Destination	Via	Length (km)
503	Mubarakpur	Mcleodganj, Dharamshala	Dera Gopipur - Ranital - Kangra - Mataur - Dharamshala	95
503 Ext	Mubarakpur	Kiratpur	Amb, Una, Dehlan, Himachal Pradesh, Anandpur Sahib	86

== Junctions ==
NH 205 Terminal near Kiratpur.
NH 503A near Una.
NH 3 near Mubarakpur.
NH 303 near Ranital.
NH 154 near Mataur.

== See also ==
- List of national highways in India
- List of national highways in India by state
