= NH 103 =

NH 103 may refer to:

- National Highway 103 (India)
- New Hampshire Route 103, United States
