= Sach Khand =

Term used in Sikhism

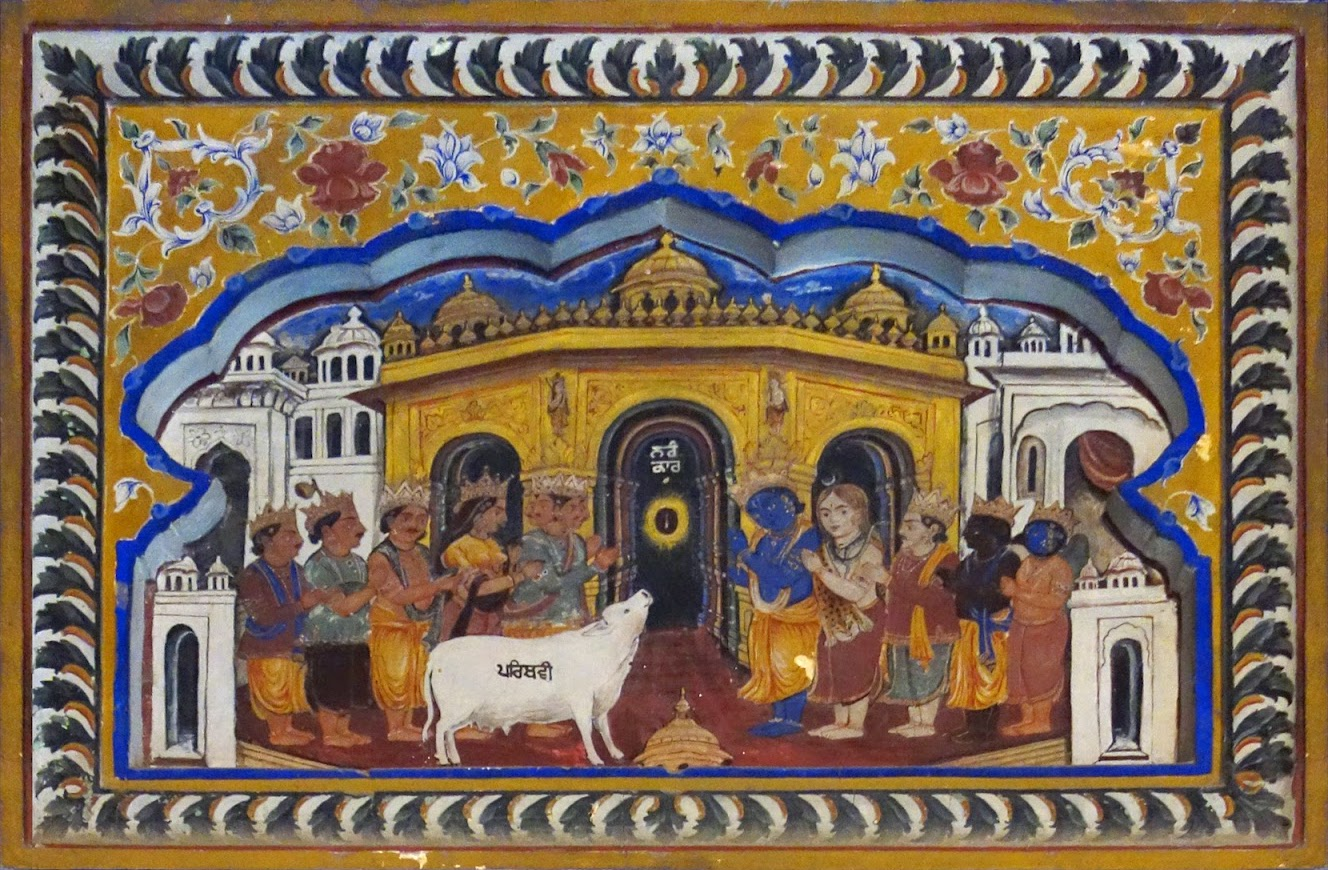
Sachkhand depiction from a mural artwork located at Gurdwara Baba Atal Sahib Ji

Sach Khand (Gurmukhi: ਸਚਖੰਡ) is a term used in Sikhism to denote an individual's union with God. Rather than being a geographical location, it is a metaphysical concept. It is one of the Panj Khands.

== Concept ==
Guru Nanak, the founder of Sikhism, described a hierarchy of five spiritual levels in the Japji Sahib. The highest level in this hierarchy is known as the Sach Khand where the individual attains a mystical union with God. Before reaching the level of Sach Khand, the individual must ascend progressively through four lower levels—starting from Dharam Khand, and progressing through Gian Khand, Saram Khand, and Karam Khand. Sach Khand is described as being impossible to explain in words but can only be experienced, this is the realm where the Nirankar divine resides and the source of hukam and state of liberation, it is the highest point of consciousness or being, being a singularity of essence with a unifying force.

Many Sikhs conceptualize Sach Khand not as a mystical state transcending death, but as a "heavenly abode"—a place where one's spirit goes after death.
