= National Highway 305 (India) =

National highway in India

National Highway 305
- Map of the National Highway in red

Route information
- Length: 97 km (60 mi)

Major junctions
- East end: Sainj
- West end: Aut

Location
- Country: India
- States: Himachal Pradesh

Highway system
- Roads in India; Expressways; National; State; Asian
← NH 5	→ NH 3

National Highway 305, commonly called NH 305 is a national highway in India. It is a branch of National Highway 5. NH-305 traverses the state of Himachal Pradesh in India.

== Geography ==
National Highway 305 is located in higher altitudes in Himachal Pradesh. The passage remains closed for four months during winters due to heavy snowfall in higher reaches, especially at the 10,800 ft high Jalori Pass. This highway provides connection to Seraj Valley.

== Route ==
Aut-Larji-Banjar-Jalori Pass-Anni-Luhri

== Junctions ==
- Terminal with National Highway 5 (Old NH22) near Sainj.
- Terminal with National Highway 3 (Old NH21) near Aut.

== See also ==
- List of national highways in India
