= Jhinwar =

Hindu and Sikh caste in India and Pakistan

Jhinwar/Jhir
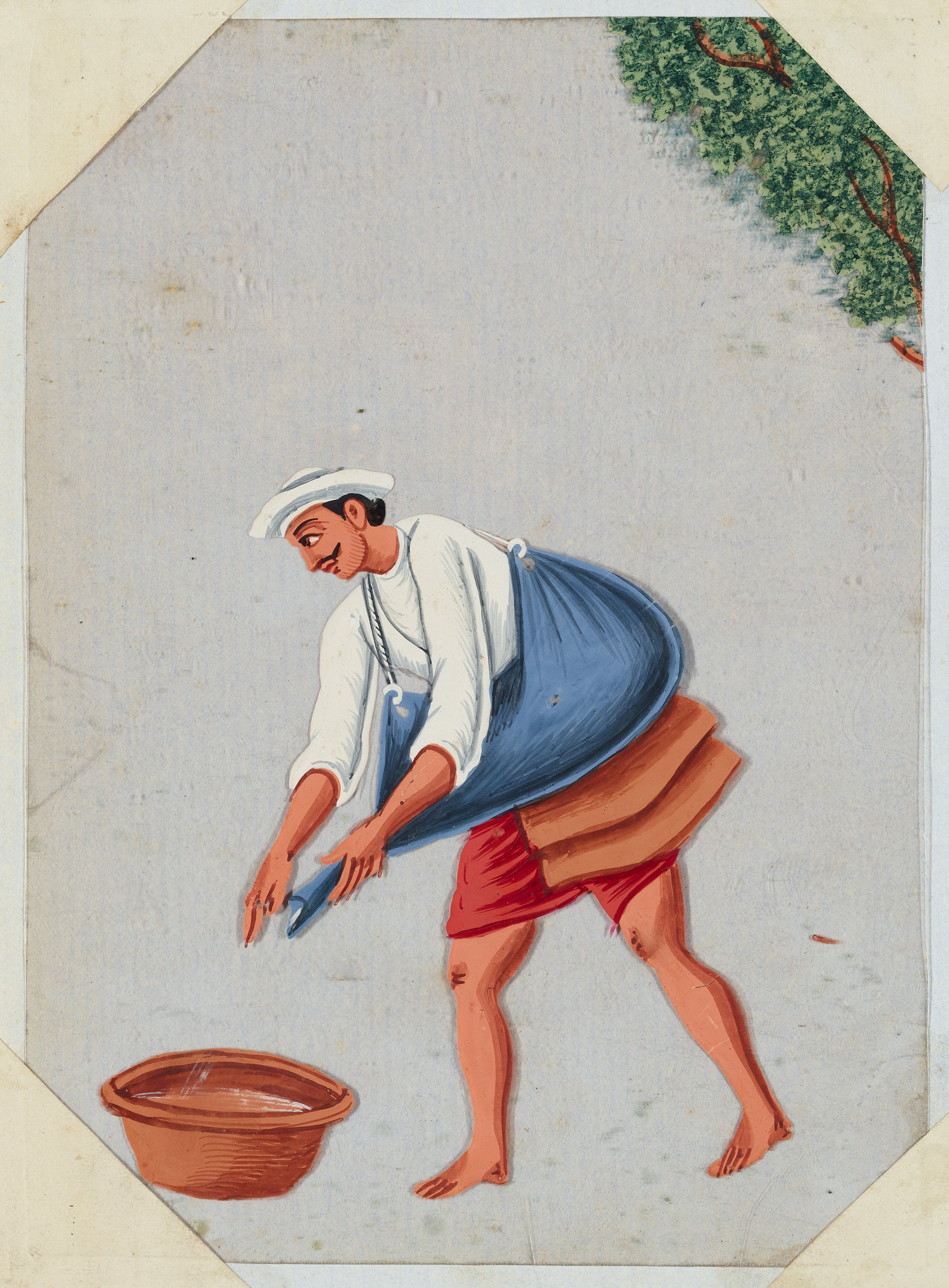
- Portrait of a water carrier with his mashk, India, 1836.

Regions with significant populations
- Northern India and Pakistan

Languages
- Hindi; Punjabi

Religion
- Sikhism; Hinduism; Islam

The Jhinwar or Jhir are a caste with a significant population in Northern parts of India and Pakistan. The community is sometimes referred to as a subcaste of boatmen. They have been traditionally engaged as water-carriers, as well as being basket-makers, cooks, field labourers, river fishermen and woodcutters, as and when required. Some women work as midwives. In modern Pakistan, they are bound by the seypi system in village life. They are also known as Kashap Rajput, which is considered a more respectful term to refer to them.

== History ==
Traditionally, the Jhinwar community was primarily engaged in the occupation of supplying water as water-carriers. The water-carrier used to fetch water from the village well and deliver it using a mashk to every household in the village, twice on a daily basis. Jhiwars were commonly engaged in occupations of professional cooking, boating, river fishing and as childbirth attendants.

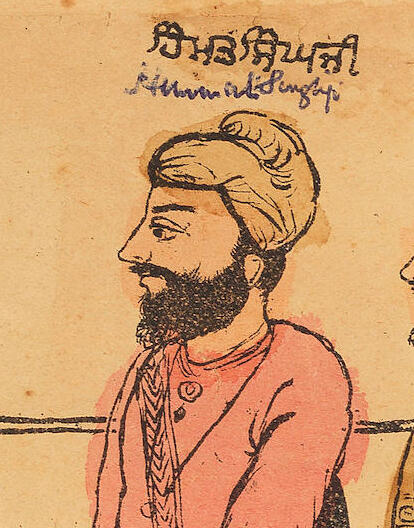
Bhai Himmat Singh, a detail from a hand-coloured woodblock print, depicting Guru Gobind Singh initiating the first-five members of the Khalsa, 1875.

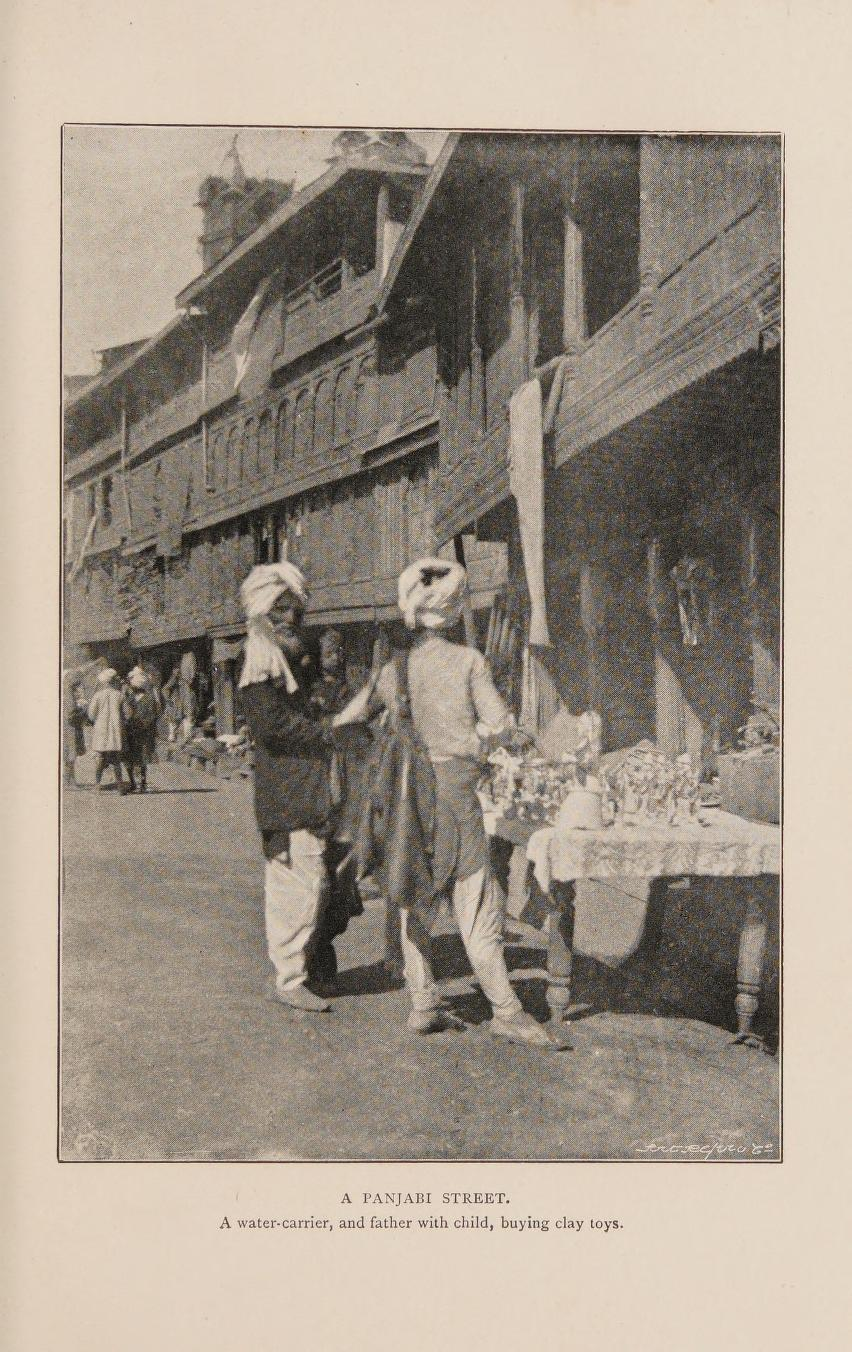
A Water Carrier in Punjab, 1899.

In India, Jhinwars traditionally used to engage as the water-carriers and they used to supply water to their patron, for which they were paid in kind biannually under the jajmani system in Punjab. Jhinwars commonly worked as the baker and seller of the ready-cooked food, known as Bhathyara, in Punjab. Jhinwars operated inns along travel routes and in markets, as well as the tandoor ovens in many villages.

The Jhir women used to prepare the roasted wheat or corn grains for the village in an open-pan over a sand oven, known as bhathi. In Punjab, a vast majority of the women engaged as dayis, the childbirth attendants and nursing women, belonged to the Jhinwar caste.

In Pakistan, the river fishermen and professional cooks have commonly belonged to the Jhinwar community. They have also been traditionally engaged in the occupations such as basket-makers, field labourers, woodcutters and the Jhinwar women fulfilled the role as midwives.

During the British Raj, Jhinwar Sikhs were often employed as the cooks and butchers in Sikh regiments. During World War I, the Jhiwars were recruited as soldiers in Jat Sikh regiments in the British Army. The number of Jhiwars employed in civil administration and military increased significantly between the years of 1911 and 1921, with some Jhirs serving as officers in the armed forces. Although, many Jhinwars primarily worked in the hospitals for the local population.

With the advent of handpumps, the Jhinwars gradually left their traditional work of supplying water and adopted new professions and occupations.

== Jhir Sikhs ==
Several members of the water-carrier caste, who converted to Sikhism, are known as Mehra Sikhs or Jhir Sikhs in Punjab. Some of the water-carrier caste converted to Sikhism, who are known as Jhir Sikhs. One of the inaugural panj piare quintets, named Himmat Singh, was said to have been a Jhir. Another Sikh figure claimed by the Jhirs is Bhai Kanhaiya. Jhir Sikhs tend to be clean-shaven rather than keeping their kesh and have Hindu-inflected name, but they still assert their identity as Sikhs and attend gurdwaras. Local deities of the Jhirs in Punjab is Khawaja, who is a water-god, and the snake-god Guā. To venerate the water-god on his festival day, they carry-out a ritual called bera tarna ("sailing a bark") which consists of sailing a piece of bark on a local canal or village-tank, and cooked, sweet dalia (porridge) is given-out to attendees to consume. However, these folk-customs are in-decline. Jhir Sikhs practice arranged marriages and caste endogamy. They tend to avoid using the names of their got (clan) as their surname, as this would reveal their low-caste origin to others. Instead, they often adopt the toponym of their ancestral locality as their surname.

The Jhirs were considered a low-caste in Punjab. In Punjabi society, they traditionally served as kammis (servants) in the jajmani system, with their role consisting of supplying water to their jajman (patron), including for agricultural purposes during harvests. Jhir women were tasked with roasting wheat or corn for the village in a type of open-pan, sand oven known as a bhathi. They were also tasked with preparing meals and washing dishes for their jajman's family. The jajman would pay them biannually for their service. They also had their own unique rituals, such as the kumbh, which was performed by Jhir women and involved pouring coins into a jug of water being carried by a Jhir woman, being considered a reward. In the U.K. diaspora, these coins are often donated to gurdwaras. Technology like hand-pumps has rendered their traditional role as warrier carriers in Punjabi villages obsolete but they continued to carry-out their other menial roles under the jajmani system.

The earliest known association of Jhinwars with Sikhism dates to 1664, when Guru Harkrishan asked Chajju Ram Jhinwar to interpret the Bhagavad Gita for Pandit Lal Chand in Delhi. According to SGPC, an old manuscript placed in Gurudwara Dukhniwaran Sahib mentions the visit of Guru Teg Bahadur to village Lehal (currently Patiala city) on the request of his Jhiwar Sikh disciple, Bhag Ram, in 1672. Bhai Himmat Singh, one of the inaugural panj piare quintets, and his nephew Moti Ram Mehra belonged to the Jhinwar Sikh community. Sardar Budh Singh Mehra, a Jhir Sikh from Mukerian, was a courtier and advisor of Maharaja Sher Singh. Sardar Budh Singh was killed by Ajit Singh Sandhawalia along with Maharaja Sher Singh. Bur Singh of Mukerian, who entered the service of Rani Mehtab Kaur, was a jagirdar of the estates in Mukerian, Batala and Lahore. He later served as the administrator of Amritsar. Mota Singh, a Jhir Sikh, was an Indian independence movement activist and later became an Indian National Congress leader in Punjab. In the late 1950s and early 1960s, the Jhir Sikhs began migrating to the United Kingdom, establishing a British diaspora for the community. In Britain, they worked as unskilled labourers. Some were twice-migrants, who came to the U.K. from the East African diaspora.

=== Diaspora ===
The members of Jhir caste, along with Jats and Chhimbas, were among the early Punjabi immigrants in Canada who emigrated from Punjab to Canada via ships in 1920s. The Punjabi emigrants regularly sent remittances to Punjab.

In the late 1950s and early 1960s, the Jhinwar Sikhs began migrating to the United Kingdom, establishing a British diaspora community. In Britain, they worked as unskilled labourers. Some were twice-migrants, who came to the U.K. from the East African diaspora.

As noted among the UK diaspora in 1992, Jhir Sikhs tended to have been clean-shaven rather than keeping their kesh and have Hindu-inflected name, but they still assert their identity as Sikhs and attend gurdwaras. Jhir Sikhs practice arranged marriages and caste endogamy. They also had their own unique rituals, such as the kumbh, which was performed by Jhir women. It involved pouring coins into a jug of water being carried by the Jhir woman and, in the U.K. diaspora, these coins were donated to the gurudwara.

== Cultural practices ==
Bhagat Baba Kalu, a Hindu Jhiwar ascetic, is a revered figure among Jhinwars. The followers of Baba Kalu are known as Kalupanthis and they venerate the Hindu gods as well as revere the Guru Granth Sahib. Annual Vaisakhi Mela (religious congregation) and Shobha Yatra (religious processions) are held at the temples of Baba Kalu, primarily in Punjab, Haryana and Uttar Pradesh.

In Punjab, the Khawaja Khidr, a water-god, and Guggā, the snake-god, are the local deities of many of the Jhinwars. The folk custom involves venerating the water-god on his festival day. Jhirs carry-out a ritual called bera tarna (sailing a bark) which consists of sailing a decorated piece of bark on a local canal or village-tank. The cooked sweet dalia (porridge) is given-out to the attendees to consume.

Hindu and Sikh Jhinwars practice caste endogamy and gotra exogamy.

== Status and occupation ==
They were regarded as an untouchable caste, living outside the traditional varna system of ritual ranking in Vedic Hinduism. However, in the latter stages of World War I, they were among the lower-caste groups who were accepted for recruitment to Jat Sikh regiments in the British Army. Traditionally, the Jhinwar community found in Punjab and Uttar Pradesh was associated with occupations such as boating, carrying water and river fishing.

Communities that are related to the Jhinwar by occupation in Uttar Pradesh include the Batham, Bind, Bhar, Dhimar, Dhinwar, Dhewar, Gariya, Gaur, Godia, Gond, Guria, Jhimar, Jhir, Jhiwar, Kahar, Kashyap, Keot, Kewat, Kharwar, Khairwar, Kumhar, Machua, Majhi, Majhwar, Mallah, Nishad, Prajapati, Rajbhar, Riakwar, Tura, Turah, Turaha, Tureha and Turaiha. There were proposals in 2013 that some or all of these communities in the state should be reclassified as Scheduled Castes under India's system of positive discrimination; this would have involved declassifying them from the Other Backwards Class category. Whether or not this would happen was a significant issue in the campaign for the 2014 Indian general election.

== Sub-groups ==
Jhinwars are also known as Kashyap Rajput and Mehra. The regional phonetic variations of the word Jhinwar include Jhimar, Jhiwar, Jheor, Jheeur, Jhir, Jheewar, Jheer, Chir, Cheer, Dhenwar and Dhinwar. Jhinwar is a composite caste consisting of various subgroups. The subgroups include Hindu Jhinwar, Sikh Jhinwar, Muslim Jhinwar, Hindi Jhinwar, Kashyap, Mehra, Rajput.

In India, as per the Mandal Commission, the Jhinwar caste is included in the Other Backward Classes (OBCs) category in the states of Punjab, Haryana, Uttar Pradesh, Jammu & Kashmir, Himachal Pradesh and Rajasthan.
