= National Highway 3 (India) =

National Highway in India

National Highway 3
- Map of the National Highway in red
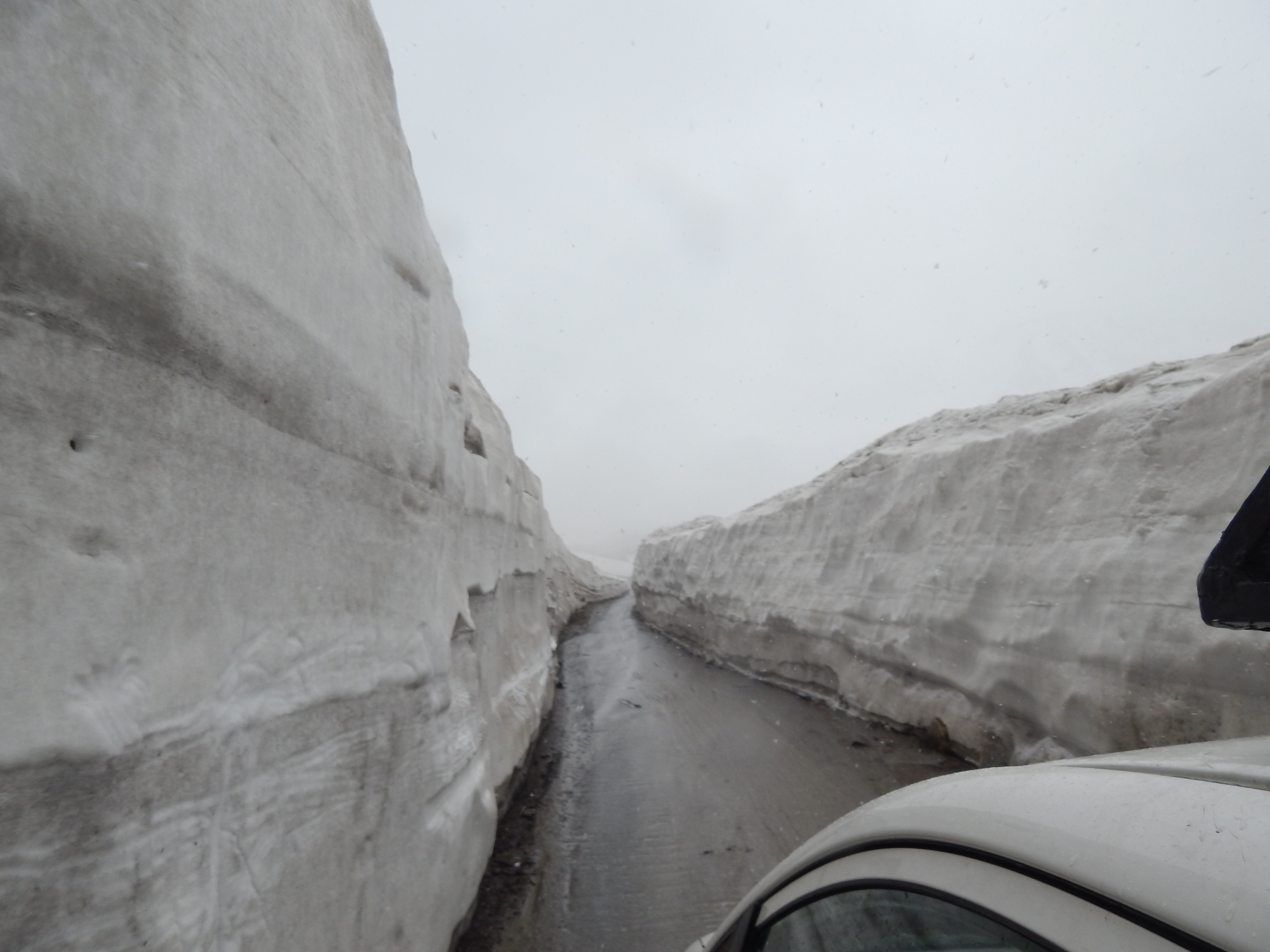
- Rohtang Pass on NH 3

Route information
- Part of AH1 AH2
- Maintained by NHAI
- Length: 990 km (620 mi)

Major junctions
- West end: Attari, Punjab
- List: NH 54 Amritsar NH 354 Amritsar NH 503A Amritsar NH 44 Jalandhar NH 703 Jalandhar NH 703A Jalandhar NH 344B Hoshiarpur NH 503A Hoshiarpur NH 503 Mubarakpur NH 303 Nadaun NH 103 Hamirpur NH 305 Aut NH 505 Gramphoo
- East end: Leh, Ladakh

Location
- Country: India
- States: Punjab, Himachal Pradesh, Ladakh
- Primary destinations: Attari, Amritsar, Kartarpur, Jalandhar, Hoshiarpur, Gagret, Nadaun, Hamirpur, Sarkaghat, Kotli, Mandi, Kullu, Manali, Gramphoo, Kyelong, Leh

Highway system
- Roads in India; Expressways; National; State; Asian
← NH 2	→ NH 4

National Highway 3, or NH 3, is a national highway in India. It starts from Atari adjacent to the India-Pakistan border near Amritsar and terminates at Leh in Ladakh, via Manali in Himachal Pradesh. The highway passes through Rohtang Pass, climbing a high altitude of 3,969 metres (13,022 ft). Now the 9,500 metres (31,200 ft) long Atal Tunnel helps in vehicles avoiding Rohtang Pass. Next this highway passes through Bara Lacha La or Bara Lacha Pass climbing a high altitude of 4,850 metres (15,910 ft) & again passes through Taglang La or Taglang Pass climbing a serious altitude of 5,328 metres (17,480 ft). This makes NH-3 the most dangerous road in the world. In winters, this highway faces severe situations. Border Roads Organization known as BRO maintains this highway 24X7 throughout the year. The Headquarters of BRO 38 Battalion is situated in Manali who are tasked with maintaining NH-3 in Manali-Leh stretch.

== History ==
After renumbering of all national highways by National Highway Authority of India in 2010, parts of the former NH 1 and NH 70 have been combined with parts of former NH 21 to create the new NH 3.

- Attari - Jalandhar section of old NH 1.
- Jalandhar - Mandi section of old NH 70.
- Mandi - Manali section of old NH 21.

== Mountain passes ==
Part of national Highway 3 runs through the upper reaches of Himachal Pradesh and Ladakh, crossing some high elevation mountain passes. First major pass comes after Manali, which is Rohtang pass at an elevation of 3,978 m. Rohtang pass provides connectivity between the Kullu valley and the Lahaul and Spiti valleys of Himachal Pradesh. Next major pass on NH3 is Baralacha La at an elevation of 4,890 m in Zanskar range. In Leh district, NH 3 crosses over Nakee La (4739 m, 15547 ft), Lachulung La (5064 m, 16616 ft) and Taglang La.

== Route ==
National Highway 3 route runs through three states.

Punjab

Attari, Amritsar, Jalandhar, Hoshiarpur - H.P. border (256 km).

Himachal Pradesh

Punjab border - Gagret, Amb, Nadaun, Hamirpur, Tauni Devi, Awah Devi, Sarkaghat, Kotli, Mandi, Kullu, Manali, Gramphoo, Kyelong - J & K border (534 km).

Ladakh

H.P border - Leh (200 km).

== Construction and upgradation ==
Process for upgrading of road from two to four lanes on Jalandhar to Hoshiarpur section was started by NHAI to improve connectivity. Traffic congestion is encountered at Adampur and Rama Mandi on this 58 km stretch. 39.4 km of this project is assigned to the public works department, Punjab.

== Junctions list ==
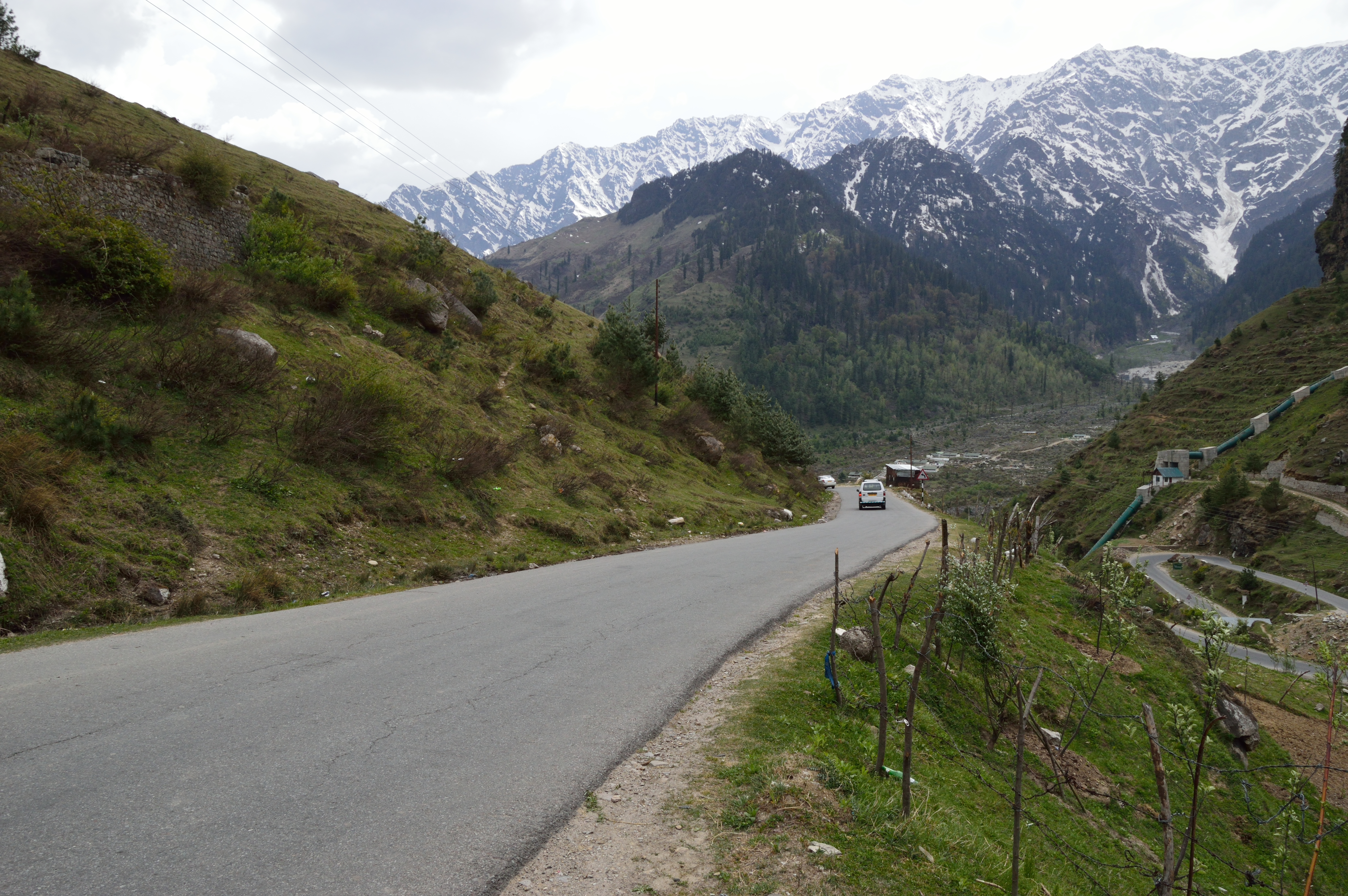
NH 3 near Kothi, Kullu district

Terminal at Wagah India/Pakistan border.
NH 54 near Amritsar
NH 354 near Amritsar
NH 503A near Amritsar
NH 44 near Jalandhar
NH 703 near Jalandhar
NH 703A near Jalandhar
NH 344B near Hoshiarpur
NH 503A near Hoshiarpur
NH 503 near Mubarakpur
NH 303 near Nadaun
NH 103 near Hamirpur
NH 305 near Aut
NH 505 near Gramphoo
NH 1 Terminal point near Leh

== Interactive map ==
Schematic map of National Highways in India

Interactive map of NH3 in red, spur routes in blue

== See also ==
- Leh-Manali Highway
- List of national highways in India
- National Highways Development Project
