= National Highway 344B (India) =

National highway in India

National Highway 344B
- Map of the National Highway in red

Route information
- Length: 38 km (24 mi)

Major junctions
- South end: Phagwara
- North end: Hoshiarpur

Location
- Country: India
- States: Punjab

Highway system
- Roads in India; Expressways; National; State; Asian
← NH 44	→ NH 3

National Highway 344B, commonly referred to as NH 344B, is a national highway in India. It is a spur road of National Highway 44. NH-344B traverses the state of Punjab in India.

== Route ==
Phagwara - Hoshiarpur.

== Junctions ==
NH 44 Terminal near Phagwara.
NH 344ATerminal near Phagwara.
NH 3 Terminal near Hoshiarpur.

== See also ==
- List of national highways in India
- List of national highways in India by state
