= Bhota =

- Town
- Location in Himachal Pradesh, India Bhota (India)
- Coordinates: 31.6087478°N 76.5672827°E
- Country: India
- State: Himachal Pradesh
- District: Hamirpur

Population (2011)
  - Total: 1,453

Languages
  - Official: Hindi
  - Native: Pahari
- Time zone: UTC+5:30 (IST)

Bhota is a town and a nagar panchayat in Hamirpur district in the state of Himachal Pradesh, India. It is located in District Hamirpur and its geographical coordinates are 32° 46' 0" North, 74° 1' 0" East and its original name (with diacritics) is Bhota.

== Demographics ==
As of 2001 India census, Bhota had a population of 1472. Males constitute 52% of the population and females 48%. Bhota has an average literacy rate of 89%, higher than the national average of 59.5%; with male literacy of 83% and female literacy of 76%. 11% of the population is under 6 years of age.

== Area profile of Bhota Town ==
As of 2001 India census,

Number of Households - 337 Average Household Size (per Household) - 4.0 Population-Total - 1,472
Population-Urban - 1,472
Proportion of Urban Population (%) - 100
Population-Rural - 0
Sex Ratio - 959
Population(0-6 Years) - 165
Sex Ratio(0-6 Years) - 774
SC Population - 452
Sex Ratio (SC) - 991
Proportion of SC (%) - 31.0
ST Population - 0
Sex Ratio (ST) - 0
Proportion of ST (%) - 0
Literates - 1,165 Illiterates - 307 Literacy Rate (%) - 79.0

== Transport ==
Bhota is well connected to Himachal and rest of India through National Highway 103 and National Highway 503A.
