= National Highway 103 (India) =

National highway in India

National Highway 103
- Map of National Highway 103 in red

Route information
- Auxiliary route of NH 3
- Maintained by NHAI
- Length: 76 km (47 mi)

Major junctions
- From: NH 3 in Hamirpur
- NH 503A, Bhota
- To: NH 154 in Ghaghas

Location
- Country: India
- States: Himachal Pradesh
- Primary destinations: Bhota, Ghumarwin, Dangaar

Highway system
- Roads in India; Expressways; National; State; Asian
← NH 3	→ NH 303

National Highway 103 (NH 103) connects Hamirpur and Ghaghas in Himachal Pradesh. The highway is 58 km (36 mi) long and runs only in Himachal Pradesh.

== Route ==
Bhota, Ghumarwin, Dadhol, Dangaar
