= Ajnoha =

- village
- Location in Punjab, India Ajnoha (India)
- Coordinates: 31.325046°N 75.8976746°E
- Country: India
- State: Punjab
- District: Hoshiarpur

Area
  - Total: 3.3 km^{2} (1.3 sq mi)
- Elevation: 236 m (774 ft)

Population (2001)
  - Total: 2,530
  - Density: 770/km^{2} (2,000/sq mi)

Languages
  - Official: Punjabi
- Time zone: UTC+5:30 (IST)
- Pin code: 144404
- Vehicle registration: PB-07-

Ajnoha is a village in the Hoshiarpur district of Punjab, India. The village is named after Baba Arjan, a Rajput warrior and founder of the village.

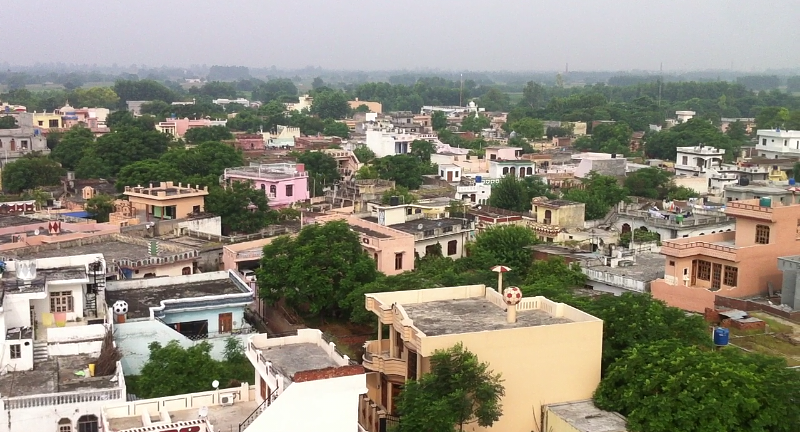
Aerial view of Ajnoha

== Geography ==
Ajnoha is located in the fertile plains of Doaba, Punjab. It is bordered by Bist Doab canal on the East, Nadalon village on the South, and a brook (Choe) on the North.

== Demographics ==
The village of Ajnoha has a population of 2,530 of which 1,287 are males while 1,243 are females as per Population Census 2011.

== Literacy rate ==
The village of Ajnoha has a higher literacy rate compared to Punjab. In 2011, the literacy rate of Ajnoha was 84.49% compared to 75.84% of Punjab. In Ajnoha, the Male literacy rate stands at 89.55% while Female literacy rate is 79.44%.

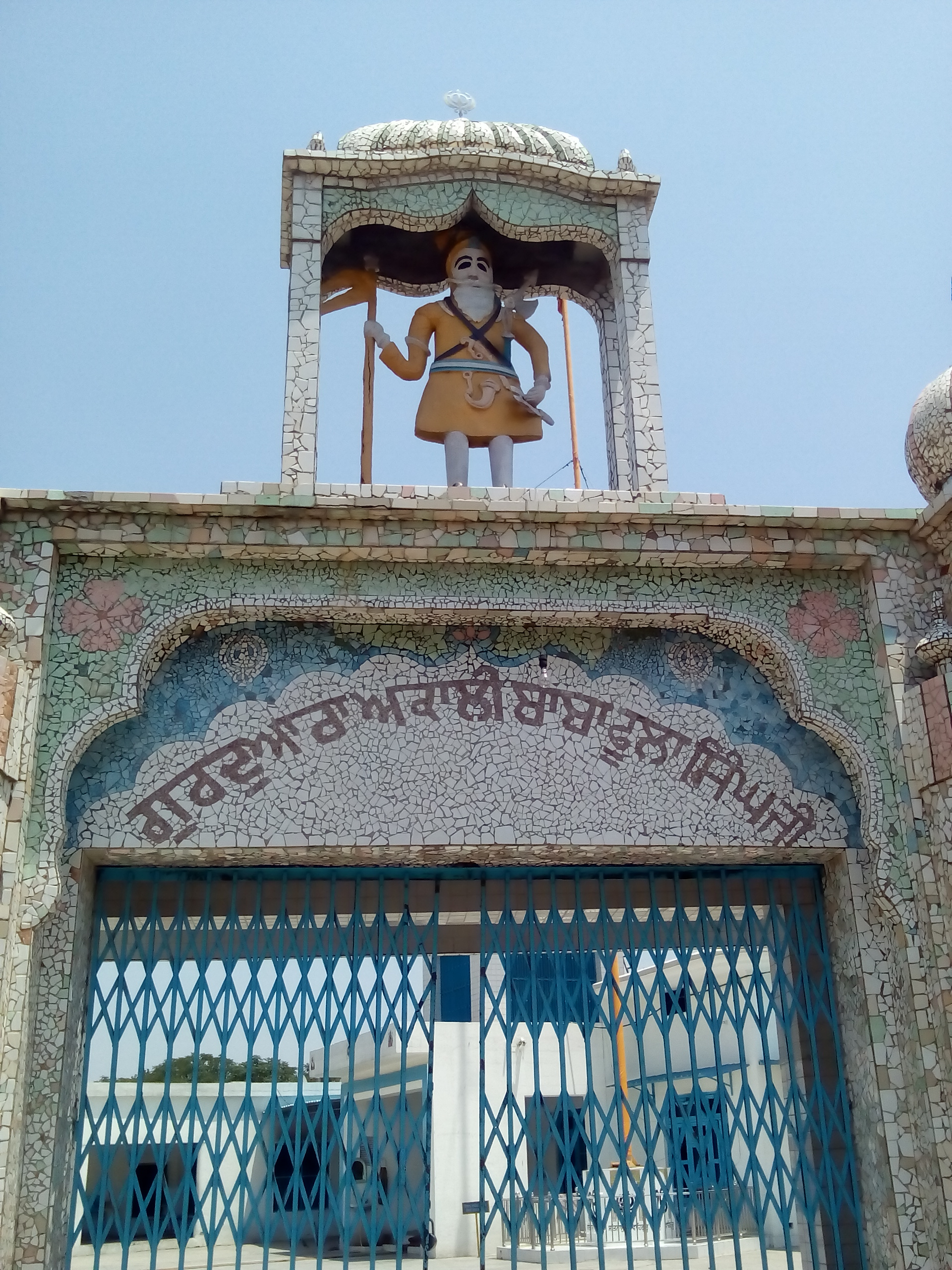
Gurudwara Akali Baba Phoola Singh ji, Ajnoha.

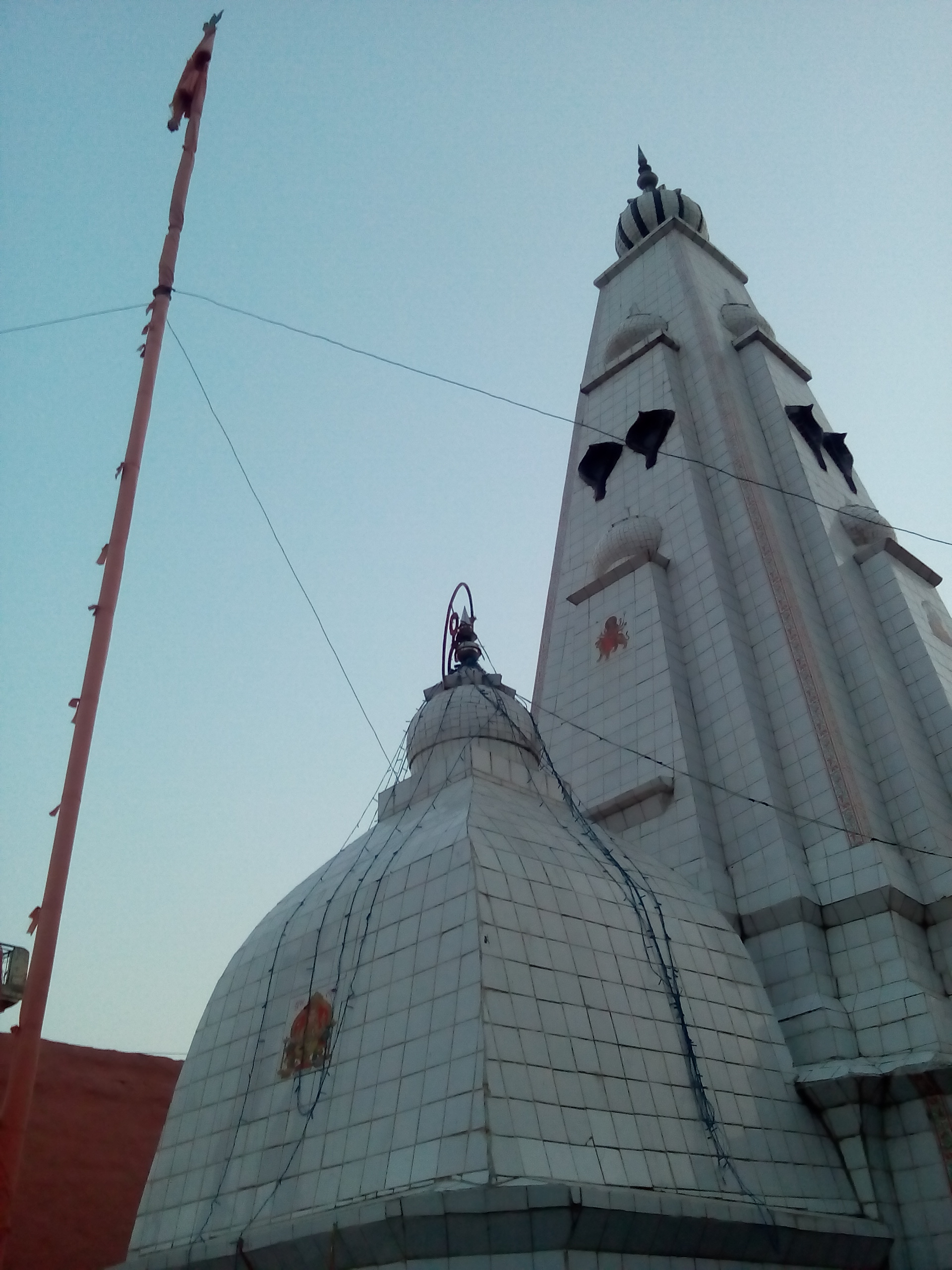
Prachin Shiv Mandir, Ajnoha.
