= National Highway 503A (India) =

National highway in India

National Highway 503A

Route information
- Auxiliary route of NH 3
- Maintained by NHAI
- Length: 209 km (130 mi)

Major junctions
- West end: NH 3 in Amritsar
- NH 44, Tanda
- East end: NH 103 in Bhota

Location
- Country: India
- States: Punjab, Himachal Pradesh
- Primary destinations: Mehta, Ghuman, Sri Hargobindpur, Tanda, Hoshiarpur

Highway system
- Roads in India; Expressways; National; State; Asian
← NH 503	→ NH 703

National Highway 503A, commonly called NH 503A is a national highway in India. It is a branch of National Highway 3. NH-503A traverses the state of Punjab and Himachal Pradesh in India.

== Route ==
Punjab

Amritsar, Mehta, Ghuman, Sri Hargobindpur, Tanda, Hoshiarpur.

Himachal Pradesh

Una, Basoli, Barsar, Salooni, Bhota.

== Junctions ==
NH 3 Terminal near Amritsar.
NH 44 near Tanda.
NH 3 near Hoshiarpur.
NH 503 near Una.
NH 103 Terminal near Bhota.

== See also ==
- List of national highways in India
- List of national highways in India by state
