= Louis E. Fenech =

Scholar of Punjab and Sikhism

Louis E. Fenech is a scholar specializing in Punjabi and Sikh studies. He obtained his Ph.D from the University of Toronto in 1995. He is associated with the University of Northern Iowa, where he works as a professor of South Asian and Sikh history. He has completed research on Sikh literature during the period of Guru Gobind Singh. His research has been to understand the role that Indic and Islamic cultures played in the history of the Sikhs and their society. He has also conducted research on the political environment during Guru Gobind Singh's guruship-period, vis-a-vis the Sikh relations with the Pahari states and Mughal Empire. An author of several books, he was the co-editor of The Oxford Handbook of Sikh Studies. Fenech has helped broaden the appeal of Sikh studies as a distinct field of academia.

== Biography ==
Fenech is from a Maltese immigrant family and grew-up in the Canadian neighbourhood of Rexdale, Etobicoke (now in Toronto) in the 1960s–70s. His curiosity of Sikhs began when he witnessed a Sikh boy wearing a patka playing on his street. In the early 1980s, he learnt about the Pape Gurdwara incident. In 1983, he began his undergraduate studies at the University of Toronto and enrolled in a course that covered Indian history. During a lecture when Fenech was 19-years-old and a first-year undergraduate student, a Sikh student wearing a turban sat in the front of the class, so the professor began talking about Baba Deep Singh, whose story deeply inspired Fenech. Later, he attended a lecture by Arthur Llewellyn Basham on Sikhism. Fenech expressed an interest in studying the Sikhs, so Basham recommended him the book Guru Nanak and the Sikh Religion by W. H. McLeod. After reading the work, Fenech felt a deep appreciation for the Sikh religion. After the Air India bombing of 1985, the University of Toronto introduced more material covering the Sikhs, allowing Fenech to further his research on them. In 1986, Fenech met W. H. McLeod, who was a source of inspiration for him. In January 1988 he met Pashaura Singh, they both attended the lectures of J. S. Grewal who was visiting their university.

Fenech researched the life and Persian works of Bhai Nand Lal of Goya, who his first academic article was on. Fenech travelled to India for one-year to study Punjabi and Braj due to a scholarship by the Shashtri Indo-Canadian Institute, studying at Delhi University under Prem Singh, with bi-weekly visits to Punjab. Because of controversies in the field of Sikh studies in the early 1990s, the University of Toronto decided to not establish a Chair of Sikh Studies. Thus, Fenech completed his doctoral dissertation gratis under McLeod. In late 1994, he completed his dissertation on Sikh martyrdom, later published in 2000 as the book Martyrdom in the Sikh Tradition: Playing the Game of Love. This work was followed by other books examining early Sikh literature, such as the Zafarnama and its connection to the Shahnameh. Fenech was able to secure employment at the University of Northern Iowa through the assistance of W. H. McLeod and Pashaura Singh, where he teaches about Sikhism and Sikhs.

== Bibliography ==
=== Books ===
- Fenech, Louis E. (2001). Martyrdom in the Sikh Tradition: Playing the 'Game of Love'. Oxford University Press. ISBN 9780195679014.
- Fenech, Louis E. (2008). The Darbar of the Sikh Gurus: The Court of God in the World of Men. Oxford University Press. ISBN 9780195694239.
- Fenech, Louis E. (2012). The Sikh Zafar-namah of Guru Gobind Singh: A Discursive Blade in the Heart of the Mughal Empire. Oxford University Press. ISBN 9780199931439.
- Singh, Pashaura; Fenech, Louis E., eds. (27 May 2014). The Oxford Handbook of Sikh Studies. Oxford University Press. ISBN 9780199699308.
- McLeod, William Hewat; Fenech, Louis E. (11 June 2014). Historical Dictionary of Sikhism (3rd ed.). Rowman & Littlefield. ISBN 9781442236004.
- Fenech, Louis E. (28 January 2021). The Cherished Five in Sikh History. Oxford University Press. ISBN 9780197532843.

=== Papers/articles/essays ===
- Fenech, Louis E. “Martyrdom and the Sikh Tradition.” Journal of the American Oriental Society, vol. 117, no. 4, 1997, pp. 623–42. JSTOR, https://doi.org/10.2307/606445.
- Fenech, Louis E. "Religion, Civil Society and the State: A Study of Sikhism." The Journal of the American Oriental Society 120.1 (2000): 132-132.
- Fenech, Louis E. "Martyrdom and the execution of Guru Arjan in early Sikh sources." Journal of the American Oriental Society (2001): 20-31.
- Fenech, Louis E. "Contested nationalisms; negotiated terrains: The way Sikhs remember Udham Singh ‘Shahid’(1899–1940)." Modern Asian Studies 36.4 (2002): 827-870.
- Fenech, Louis E., and Pashaura Singh. "Vows in the Sikh Tradition." Dealing with Deities: The Ritual Vow in South Asia (2006): 201.
- Fenech, Louis E. "The Socially Involved Renunciate: Guru Nanak's Discourse to the Nath Yogis." Journal of the American Oriental Society 128.3 (2008): 622.
- Fenech, Louis E. "Martyrdom: WH McLeod and his Students." JPS 17 (2010): 1-2.
- Fenech, Louis E. "Poetry of Kings: The Classical Hindi Literature of Mughal India." (2012): 567-569.
- Fenech, Louis E. "The History Of The Zafar-Nāmah Of Guru Gobind Singh." Punjab Reconsidered: History, Culture, and Practice (2012).
- Fenech, Louis E. "Woven Masterpieces of Sikh Heritage: the stylistic development of the Kashmir shawl under Maharaja Ranjit Singh 1780–1839." (2012): 261-265.
- Fenech, Louis E. "Ranjit Singh, The Shawl, And The Kaukab-I Iqbāl-I Punjāb." Sikh Formations 11.1-2 (2015): 83-107.
- Fenech, Louis E. "Drinking from love’s cup: surrender and sacrifice in the Vārs of Bhai Gurdas Bhalla." (2017): 225-233.
- Fenech, Louis E. "The Image of Guru Nanak in Dadu-Panthi Sources." Religions 11.10 (2020): 518.
- Fenech, Louis. "Guru Gobind Singh and the Khalsa." Global Sikhs. Routledge, 2023. 73-92.
- Fenech, Louis E. "A historian’s quest for Sikh history." Sikh Formations (2023): 1-10.
- Fenech, Louis E. "Persian Sikh Literature." The Sikh World. Routledge, 2023. 73-82.
