= Twice-migration =

Type of migration

Twice-migration is a term used to refer to migrants who move from their place of origin to a new location (an intermediary, second location), and then move again to a third location. Meanwhile, direct migration refers to immigrants moving from their homeland to their permanent place of residence, with there being no intermediary country between it. The phenomenon is particularly common in the South Asian diaspora. A common example is the immigration of South Asians from Southeastern Africa and the Caribbean to the United States, Canada, the United Kingdom, and the Netherlands. Many South Asians from the Gulf countries moved to Canada, thus being twice-migrants. A link to chronic poverty has been suggested. Many are descended from Girmityas (indentured labourers). The term can be used for in both an individual or ethnic-sense, referring either to persons who migrate twice or persons belonging to an diasporic ethnicity who may have been born in an intermediary country but moved elsewhere.

== Thrice-migration ==
Thrice-migration is a related term, that refers to there being two intermediary places between the homeland and adopted land. The process could take place over two or three generations. Many thrice-migrations involve South Asians and the United Kingdom. An example is the East Indians from Africa who moved to the United Kingdom and then again to Canada or Australia.

== East Asian twice-migration ==
=== Chinese ===
Many Chinese people in the United Kingdom are twice-migrants as they originate from the Caribbean.

=== Koreans ===
Some Korean Americans were twice-migrants from China, Japan, former Soviet republics, Europe, and South America.

== South Asian twice-migration ==
=== Sikhs ===
The phenomenon was particularly common in the Sikh global diaspora during the colonial-period, with there often being migration to Western countries from east and southeast Asian regions. Sikhs in China had been observing the Chinese migrating to Canada, seeing as it was an attractive destination for settlement, and emulated the Chinese by attempting to migrate to Canada themselves whilst alerting their friends and family back home in India on the prospect. Many Sikhs who were aboard the ill-fated Komagata Maru en route to Canada hailed from Shanghai. According to Cao Yin, Shanghai played a pivotal role in the establishment of a Sikh diaspora throughout the world as Shanghai was often the first-stop in the global migration of Sikhs throughout the globe. Furthermore, many southeast Asian countries' local Sikh populations are descended from Malayan Sikh twice-migrants. Another example are the East African Sikhs in the United Kingdom who originally moved there from East Africa but ultimately originated from India.

== See also ==
- Expulsion of Asians from Uganda
- Asian immigration to the United States
- Immigrant generations
- Return migration
