= Khushalpur =

- Town
- Country: India
- State: Uttar Pradesh
- District: Hathras
- Tehsil: Sikandra Rao
- Region: Aligarh

Government
  - Type: Municipal Board

Population (2011)
  - Total: 1,987
  - Scheduled Castes: Gaderiya
  - Total households: 505

Languages
  - Official: Hindi
- Time zone: UTC+5:30 (IST)
- Postal code: 204211
- Telephone: 01871
- ISO 3166 code: IN-UP
- Vehicle registration: UP 86
- Website: up.gov.in

Khushalpur is a town in Hathras district of Uttar Pradesh State, India. It is located 1 kilometre (0.62 mi) from the sub district headquarters and 41 kilometres (25 mi) from district headquarters. The town is administrated by a chairman, an elected representative.

== Demography ==
As of 2011, the town had a total number of 505 houses and a population of 1,987, of which 988 were males while 969 were females. According to the report published by Census India in 2011, out of the total population of the town, 1987 people were from Caste Baghel, and the village did not have any Schedule Tribe population.1987
