= Dogra Jheer =

Hindu caste

The Dogra Jheevar are a Hindu caste found in the Jammu region of Jammu and Kashmir, India.

== Origin ==
The word is said to be a corruption of the Sanskrit dheevara, which means someone of mixed origin. Dheevaras receive a mention in the Mahabharat. In the Dogri language, the term jheer was often used for a cook. This community may have acquired the name Jheer because its members were employed as cooks. The Jheer are a caste associated with water-carrying and may be connected with the Jhinwar caste of Punjab. Like the Jhinwar and the Kahar of North India, the Jheer were also employed as palanquin bearers.

The homeland of the Jheer is a region historically known as Duggar Des, an area stretching from Udhampur in the north and Kathua in the south. They speak the Dogri language, and their customs and traditions are similar to the locally dominant Dogra community.

== Present circumstances ==
Like most other North Indian Hindu castes, the Jheer consists of number of clans, with strict rules of clan exogamy. Their major clans are the Balgota, Bamotra, Khisku, Pounti, Bera, Doe, Athgotra, Sukhajange, Manhotra, Baspurie, Allar, Manni, Sarmutre, Chikkardubbe, Lunjh, Jallandhari, Dain, Bahri, Seotre, Malgotre, Maski, Koonj, Gadari, Pekoe, Sagoch, and Poonchi. They are also strictly caste-endogamous and occupy their own quarters in villages.

This was historically a landless community, traditionally associated with fishing, water carrying and palanquin bearing. Many were granted lands as part of the land reform carried out by the Government of India, just after independence in 1947.

Most of them are involved in small businesses, especially restaurant/dhaba businesses, a trade in which the Jhinwar/Dhimar/Jheer have a monopoly in North India.
