= Jalwehra =

Jalwehra, commonly known as Jalerha, is a village in Hoshiarpur, Punjab, India. Its population in the 2011 census was 616: 310 males and 306 females. In 2011, the literacy rate of Jalwehra village was 82.22% compared to 75.84% in Punjab. In Jalwehra male literacy was 89.86% and female literacy rate was 74.47%.

Its area is 1.35 square kilometres.
