= Pashaura Singh (Sikh scholar) =

Religious studies scholar and a professor at the University of California

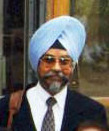
Pashaura Singh, School of Oriental and African Studies (S.O.A.S.), London, 1998

Pashaura Singh is a religious studies scholar and a professor at the University of California, Riverside where he currently holds the Dr. Jasbir Singh Saini Endowed Chair in Sikh and Punjabi Studies.

== Biography ==
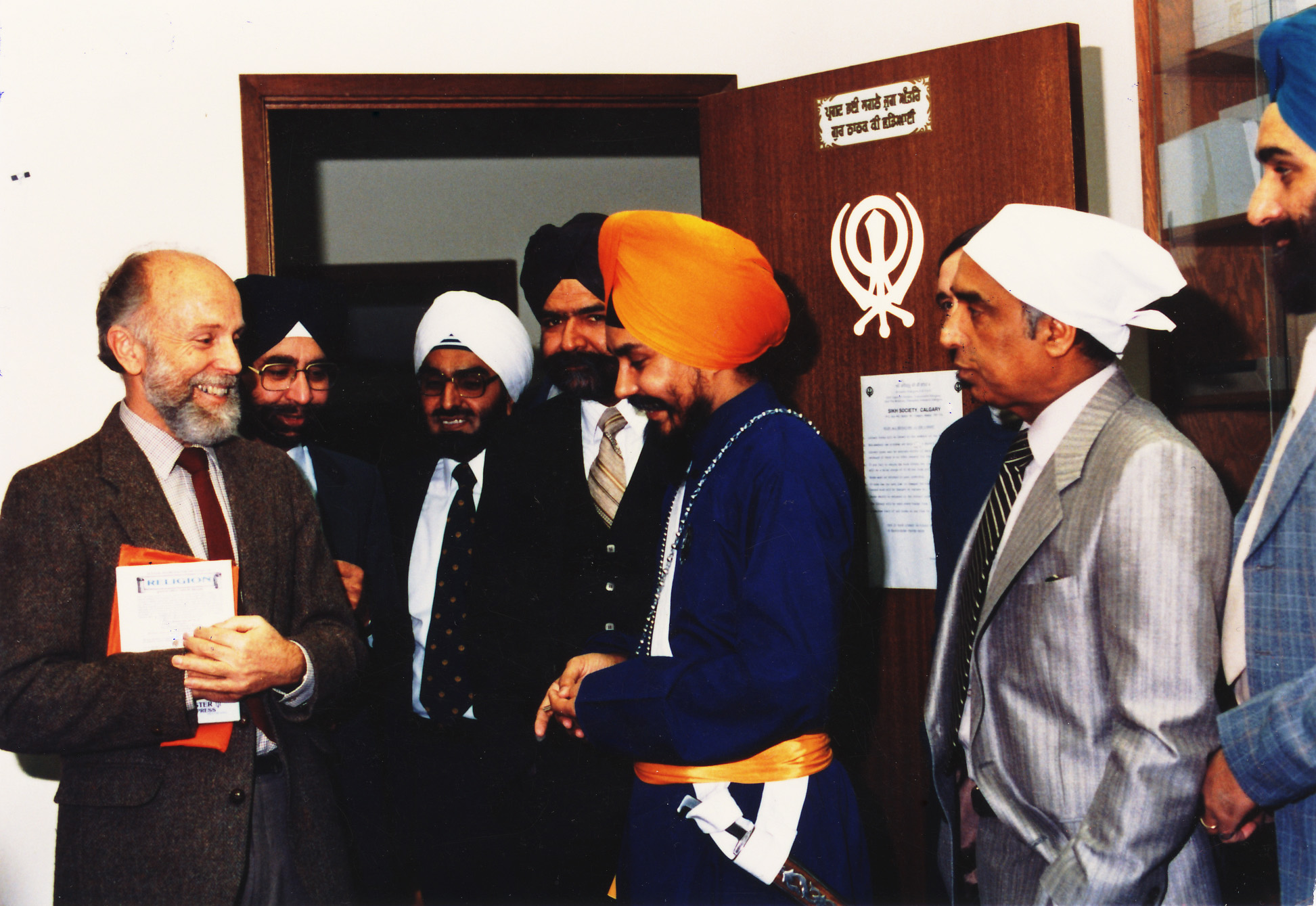
William Hewat McLeod meeting Pashaura Singh (then a granthi) in Calgary, Canada, 1987. The photograph from the collection of Amarjit Chandan.

He completed his Ph.D. at University of Toronto under the supervision of W. H. McLeod – an influential scholar and historian of Sikhism. Singh pursued an academic career and joined the University of Michigan, where he edited and co-published two collections of Sikh studies.

== Controversies ==
Copies of Singh's thesis at University of Toronto, "The Text and Meaning of the Adi Granth", were circulated without permission. Some of these reached the conservative faction of the Sikh community, who with alarm, complained about it before the Akal Takht at the Golden Temple. Singh's academic studies were strongly criticized by the conservative Sikhs, he became a target of hostile attacks, and was pressured to withdraw parts of his thesis. He refused, saying his thesis was based on "very sound underpinnings". Singh was summoned by Akal Takht but missed the first summons, and later attempted to justify his actions, stating "I have simply compared the manuscripts of the third Guru and of the fifth Guru (Arjan Dev) and tried to establish the editorial policy of Arjan Dev (who is credited with compiling the holy book)", according to India Today. He later appeared before the Akal Takht, apologizing for any distress he may have caused, and offered to amend anything incorrect in his thesis, but nothing else. His apology and offer were accepted.

In 2019, Sikh advocacy groups such as United Sikh Party objected to an invitation to Pashaura Singh by Punjabi University for an International History Conference. They accused Singh of questioning the "authenticity of Shri Guru Granth Sahib" and treating the "Travels of Guru Nanak" as fake. They threatened to protest if Singh was allowed to speak at the conference. Singh did not attend the conference, citing personal reasons.

== Works ==
Pashaura Singh is considered a leading scholar of Sikh scriptures and literature. He has written several books on this subject and his major publications include:

- The Guru Granth Sahib: Canon, Meaning, and Authority (Oxford University Press, New Delhi, 2000).
- The Bhagats of the Guru Granth Sahib: Sikh Self-Definition and the Bhagat Bani (Oxford University Press, New Delhi, 2003).
- Life and Work of Guru Arjan: History, Memory and Biography in the Sikh Tradition (Oxford University Press, New Delhi), 2006.
- Sikhism in Global Context (Oxford University Press, USA), 2012.
- The Transmission of Sikh Heritage in the Diaspora, co-editor with N. Gerald Barrier, (Manohar Publishers & Distributors, New Delhi) 1996.
- Sikh Identity: Continuity and Change, co-editor with N. Gerald Barrier, (Manohar Publishers & Distributors, New Delhi), 1999.
- Sikhism and History, Co-editor with N. Gerald Barrier, (Oxford University Press, New Delhi), 2004.
- The Oxford Handbook of Sikh Studies, co-editor with Louis E. Fenech, (Oxford University Press, USA), 2014.
