= National Highway 154 (India) =

National highway in India

National Highway 154
- Map of National Highway 154 in red

Route information
- Length: 279 km (173 mi)

Major junctions
- From: Pathankot
- To: Bilaspur, Himachal Pradesh

Location
- Country: India

Highway system
- Roads in India; Expressways; National; State; Asian
← NH 54	→ NH 205

National Highway 154 (NH 154) is a National Highway in India.
