= National Highway 254 (India) =

National highway in India

National Highway 254
- Map of the National Highway in red

Route information
- Length: 155 km (96 mi)

Major junctions
- North end: Mudki
- South end: Dabwali

Location
- Country: India
- States: Punjab, Haryana

Highway system
- Roads in India; Expressways; National; State; Asian
← NH 54	→ NH 54

National Highway 254, commonly referred to as NH 254, is a national highway in India. It is a spur road of National Highway 54. NH-254 traverses the states of Punjab and Haryana in India.

== Route ==
Punjab

Mudki - Baghapurana -jawahar singh wala -Dina -Salabatpura - Rampura - Maur - Takth Sri Damdama Sahib - Raman mandi- Haryana Border.

Haryana

Punjab Border- Near Dabwali.

== Junctions ==
NH 54 Terminal near Mudki.
NH 105B near Bagha Purana.
NH 7 near Rampura Phul.
NH 148B near Maur
NH 54 Terminal near Raman.

== See also ==
- List of national highways in India
- List of national highways in India by state
