= National Highway 507 (India) =

National Highway in India

National Highway 507
- Map of National Highway 507 in red
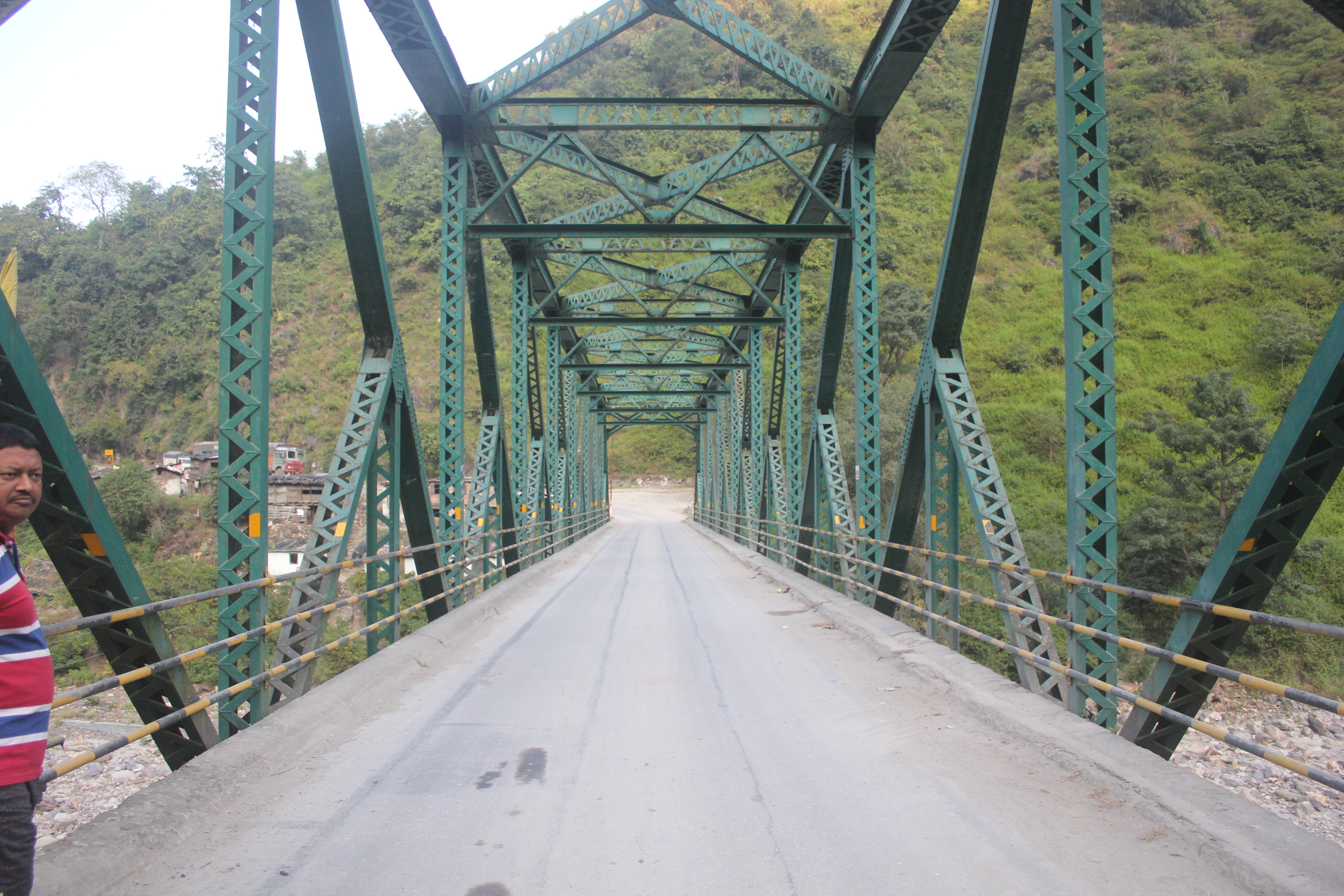
- Bridge across Yamuna river on National Highway 507

Route information
- Auxiliary route of NH 7
- Length: 111.4 km (69.2 mi)

Major junctions
- South end: Herbertpur
- North end: Barkot

Location
- Country: India
- States: Uttarakhand: 111.4 km (69.2 mi)

Highway system
- Roads in India; Expressways; National; State; Asian
← NH 7	→ NH 134

National Highway 507 (NH 507) starts from Herbertpur and ends at Barkot, both places in the state of Uttarakhand. This national highway is 111.4 km (69.2 mi) long. It is a secondary route of National Highway 7. NH-507 runs entirely in the state of Uttarakhand in India. Before renumbering of Indian national highways, it was numbered as NH 123.

== Route ==
NH507 connects Herbertpur, Vikasnagar, Kalsi and Barkot in the state of Uttarakhand in India.

== Junctions ==
NH 7 Terminal near Herbertpur.
NH 707A near Yamuna Bridge
NH 134 Terminal near Barkot.

== See also ==
- List of national highways in India
- List of national highways in India by state
- National Highways Development Project
