= National Highway 54 (India) =

National highway in India

National Highway 54
- Map of the National Highway in red

Route information
- Length: 646 km (401 mi)

Major junctions
- North end: NH 44 in Pathankot, Punjab
- List: NH 354 in Gurdaspur, Punjab; NH 3 / NH 503A in Amritsar, Punjab; NH 703AA in Tarn Taran Sahib, Punjab; NH 703A / NH 703B in Makhu, Punjab; NH 5 in Talwandi Bhai, Punjab; NH 254 in Mudki, Punjab; NH 105B in Kot Kapura, Punjab; NH 7 / NH 148B / NH 754 in Bathinda, Punjab; NH 254 in Gurthari, Punjab; NH 9 in Mandi Dabwali, Haryana; NH 754K in Chautala, Haryana; NH 954 in Pakka Saharana, Rajasthan
- South end: NH 62 in Kenchiya, Rajasthan

Location
- Country: India
- States: Punjab, Haryana, Rajasthan
- Primary destinations: Pathankot, Gurdaspur, Amritsar, Faridkot, Bathinda, Hanumangarh

Highway system
- Roads in India; Expressways; National; State; Asian
← NH 53	→ NH 55

National Highway 54 (NH 54) is a 646 kilometres (401 mi) long National Highway in India. This is highway runs in the Indian state of Punjab Haryana & Rajasthan. It starts near Pathankot and ends at Kenchiya in Hanumangarh district, Rajasthan.

== See also ==
- List of national highways in India
- National Highways Development Project
