= Vakilan Wala =

- Village
- Country: India
- State: Punjab
- District: Ferozepur
- Established: 1955
- Named for: M.O.D

Government
  - Type: State Government
  - Body: Government of India

Language
  - Official: Punjabi
- Time zone: UTC+5:30 (IST)
- PIN: 142047
- Telephone code: 01666
- ISO 3166 code: PB-IN
- Vehicle registration: PB 47

Vakilan Wala is the northernmost village of the Indian state of Punjab situated near Zira City, Punjab, and the international border of India and Pakistan. It is the administrative headquarters of Ferozepur District.

== Religion ==
Most people practice the Hindu and Sikh religions. People worship folk gods such as Ramdevji and Gogaji. Many have faith in Pirs and Saints and they visit their khanghahs (shrines). Some practise Islam. Some follow Dera-culture, such as Sachcha-Sauda, Radha-Soami and Nirankari deras.

== Location and area ==
Vakilan Wala Ferozepur District is located between Latitude 31.0 to 31.2 and Longitude 72.2 to 75.3 The total area of Vakilan Wala is 11,154.66 km^{2} or 1,115,466 hectares. It is surrounded on the east by Zira, (Zira City was carved out of it on 12 July 1994) on the south by Moga district, and on the west by Talwandi Bhai district of the Pakistani Punjab and on the north by the Punjab.

=== By Air ===
Nearest airports are Amritsar which is approachable by road 81.9 km, by rail 360 km, Jaipur, Delhi, Chandigarh.

- The Ferozepur city is well connected with major cities through both rail and road transport
- A metro rail project is also likely to be initiated in the near future.

Vakilan Wala is well connected by railways to Delhi 424, Rewari 427, Kalka 397, Howrah 1980, Bathinda 127, Haridwar 485, Nanded 1963, Firozpur 184 Suratgarh 60 km etc. Track between Ferozepur and Bathinda 106 km is being converted into broad gauge. This work is completed in March 2013.

=== By Road ===
National Highway No-54 is running from Sirsa to Amritsar, which is well linked with all the major areas of Bathinda. Many roadways and private buses are frequently available to major cities of north India like Bathinda 431 km, Faridkot 501 km, Talwandi Bhai, Dabwali, Haryana, Punjab. It is well connected to Delhi 1472 km by road.

== Climate ==
The climate of Vakilan Wala varies to extreme limits. Summer temperature reaches 50 °C and winter temperature dips just around 0 °C. The average annual rainfall is only 200 mm (7.9 in). Average maximum temperature in summer is 41.2 °C and average minimum temperature in winter is 6 °C.

== Education ==
The village has been a center of learning since its early ages. This city has a large proportion of land which is dedicated to educational institutes. Notable educational institutions from the city include:

- Govt. Sen. Sec. School
- Govt. Primary School

== Languages ==
The main languages in the area are Punjabi a dialect of Punjabi, Punjabi and Hindi as well. Majority of people in the district speaks Punjabi, Punjabi. Hindi and English are official languages. The Punjabi language, as an optional subject, is taught in schools and colleges of the city. Punjabi music is very popular in the Sri Ganganagar. The impact of the Saraiki dialect can be observed in Arora, Raisikhs and Saraiki Muslim communities. Now this dialect, Saraiki is losing ground in the northern part of the district.

== Culture ==
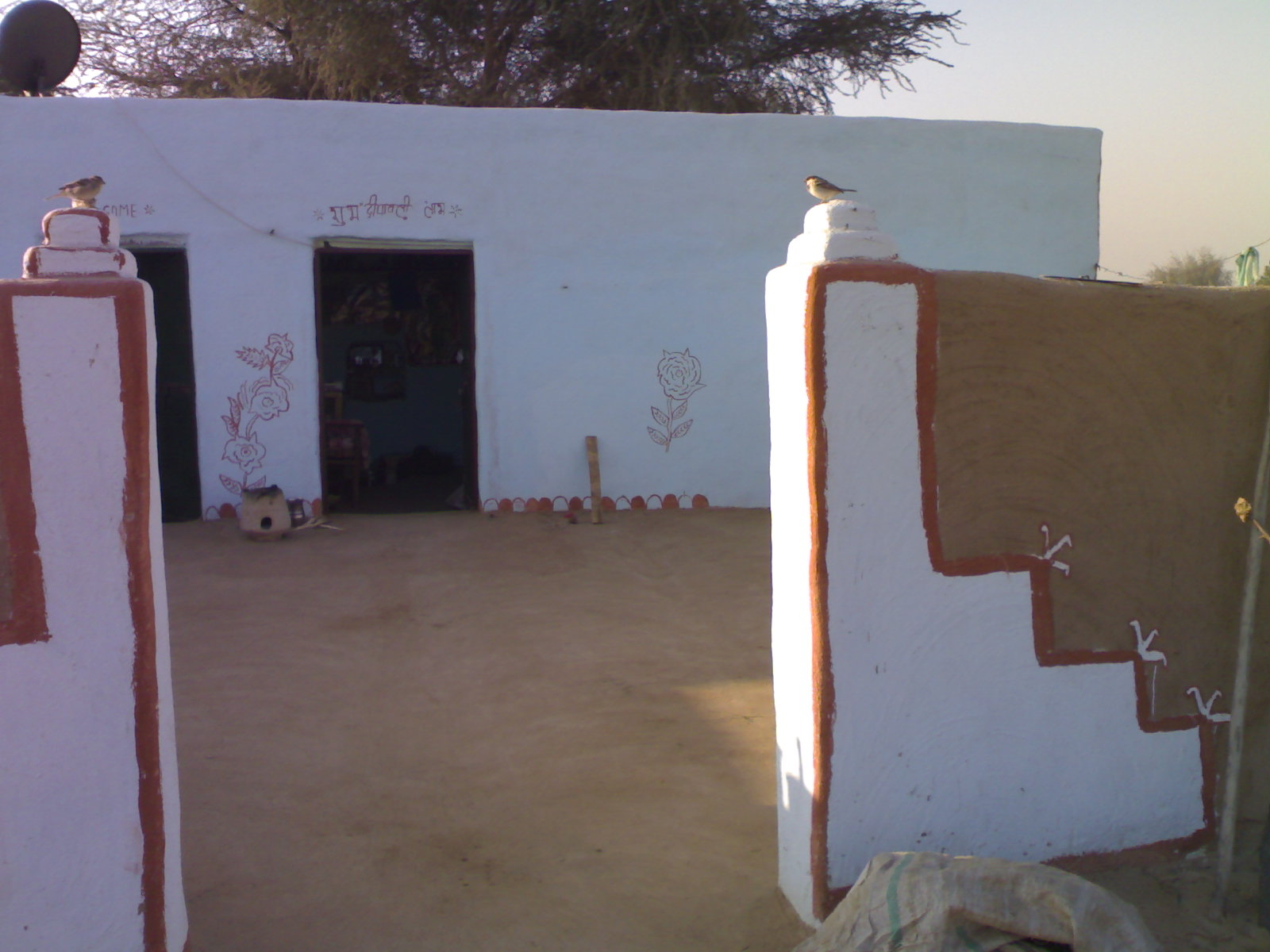
Rural kutcha homes with folk art can be seen in some remote villages, but this art is losing ground.

Punjabi and Haryana cultures dominate the district.

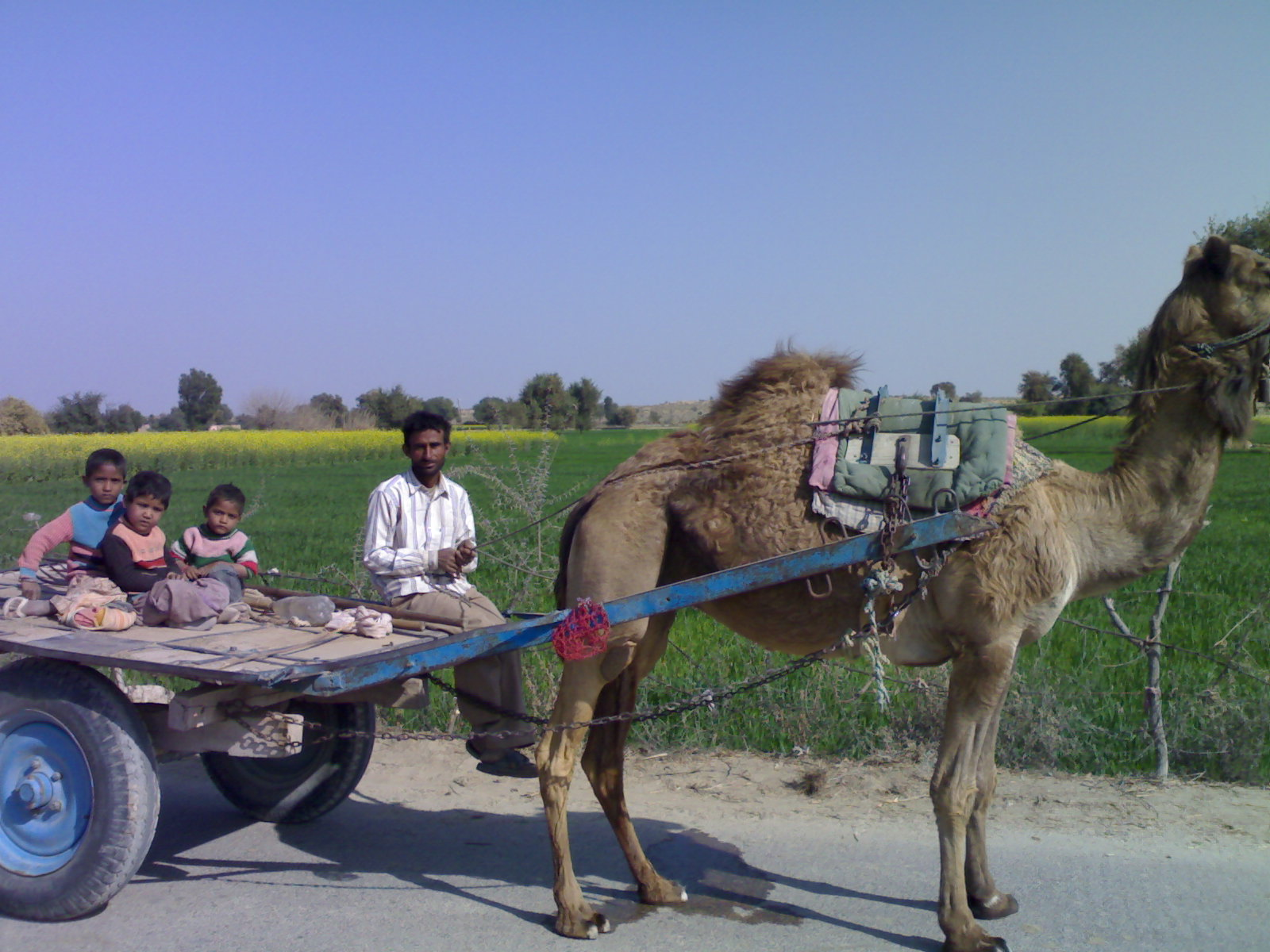
Such scenes are common in some southern villages.

The embroidered Dupatta (mostly red in colour) is a symbol of Bagri women. A long shirt and ghaghro (long frock type clothes) and borlo (a head ornament) is the traditional dress of Bagri women.

Punjabi women wear a suit and salwar with chunni (cloth on head). This attire has also become popular with women of other communities. Some women of the Hindu and Muslim Seraiki people still wear ghaggra (long frock).

Traditional Sikh and Punjabi devotional music is popular. Bollywood songs are listened to with same enthusiasm as in other northern Indian regions.

== Tehsils and other towns ==
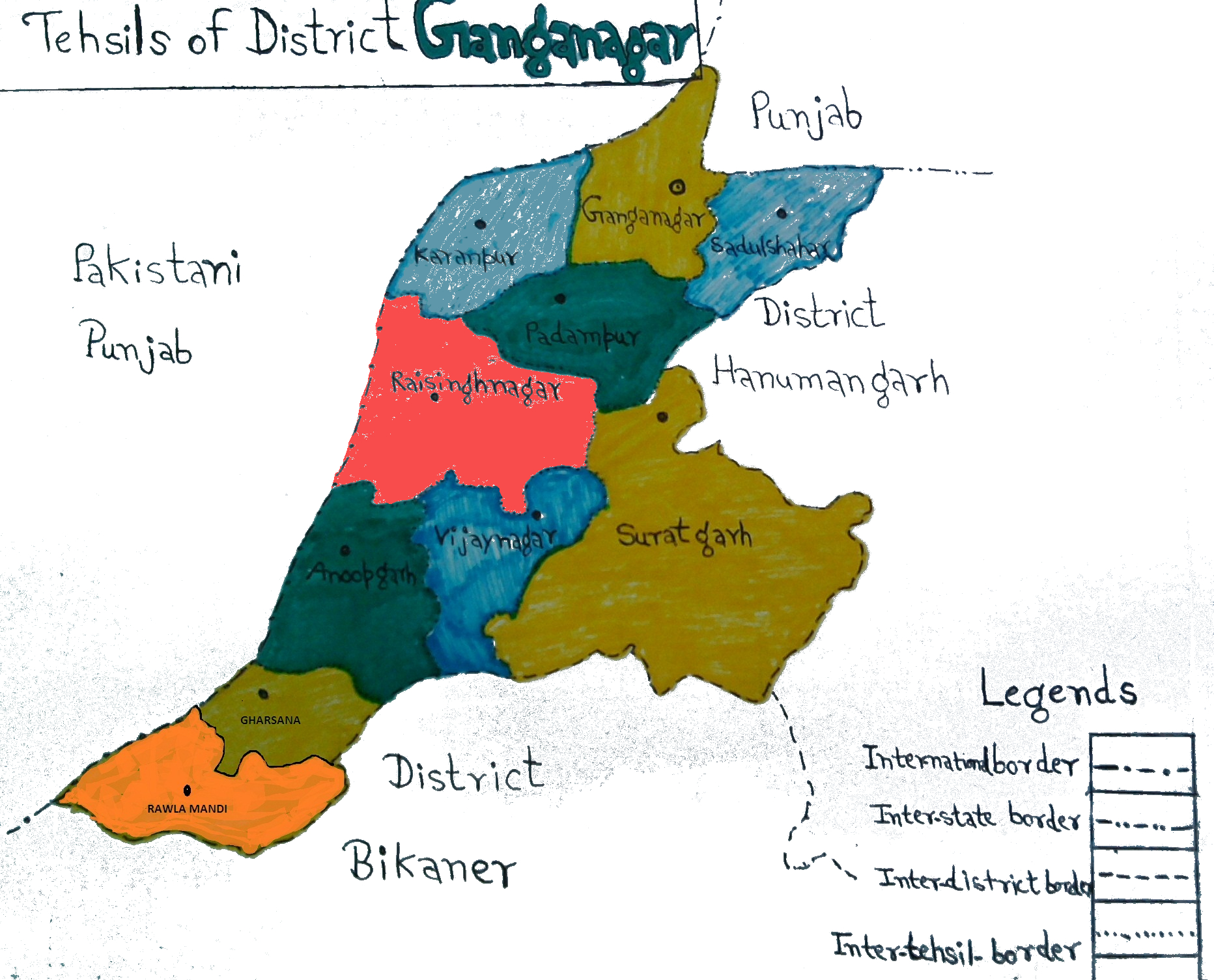
Map showing nine tehsils of Ferozpur District, click this image for large map.

=== Zira tehsil ===
1. Zira

=== Other major towns in villages ===
- Panchayat Bhawan
- Ramdev Mandir
- Guruduwara Sahib
