= Pind Kassoana =

Village in Ferozepur district, Punjab, India

Coordinates: 30°57′8″N 74°53′14″E

Pind Kassoana is a village in Ferozepur district, Punjab. It is 12 kilometres (7.5 mi) from Zira and Talwandi Bhai. It is 24 kilometres (15 mi) from Ferozepur.

The population was 1694 in the 2011 Indian census. The village was established about 250 years back. Gills and Srans are the two main jatt Sikh communities living in the village. It also has substantial dalit population. Among the prominent personalities who hailed from this village are late Saudagar Singh Gill, the legendary freestyle wrestler and Pritam Singh Kumedan former PCS officer and an expert on inter state water disputes.

This village also have Kang community who moved from nearby village Hardasa to Pakistan before partition and came to settle in Kassoana after partition in 1947. Sardar Mohinder Singh Kang was a freedom fighter from this village, who fought for the independence of India. He was appointed as teacher by first Indian Government led by Sh Jawahar Lal Nehru. S Mohinder Singh Kang's son Surjit Singh Kang obtained Veterinary Science Graduation degree from Punjab Agricultural University Ludhiana and now settled in Australia. Surjit Singh Kang is appointed as Veterinary Officer with Australian Government now.
