= National Highway 105B (India) =

National highway in India

National Highway 105B
- Map of National Highway 105B in red

Route information
- Auxiliary route of NH 5

Major junctions
- North end: NH 5 in Moga
- NH 254 in Bagha Purana
- South end: NH 54 in Kot Kapura

Location
- Country: India
- States: Punjab
- Primary destinations: Moga, Bagha Purana, Kot Kapura

Highway system
- Roads in India; Expressways; National; State; Asian
← NH 5	→ NH 54

National Highway 105B, commonly referred to as NH 105B, is a national highway in India. It is a spur road of National Highway 5 in the state of Punjab in India, that links its parent route in the city of Moga, to National Highway 54 just outside of Kot Kapura, via the town of Bagha Purana.

== See also ==
- List of national highways in India
- List of national highways in India by state
