= NH 107A =

NH 107A may refer to:

- National Highway 107A (India)
- New Hampshire Route 107A, United States
