= Nagar kirtan =

Indian religious tradition

Nagar Kirtan
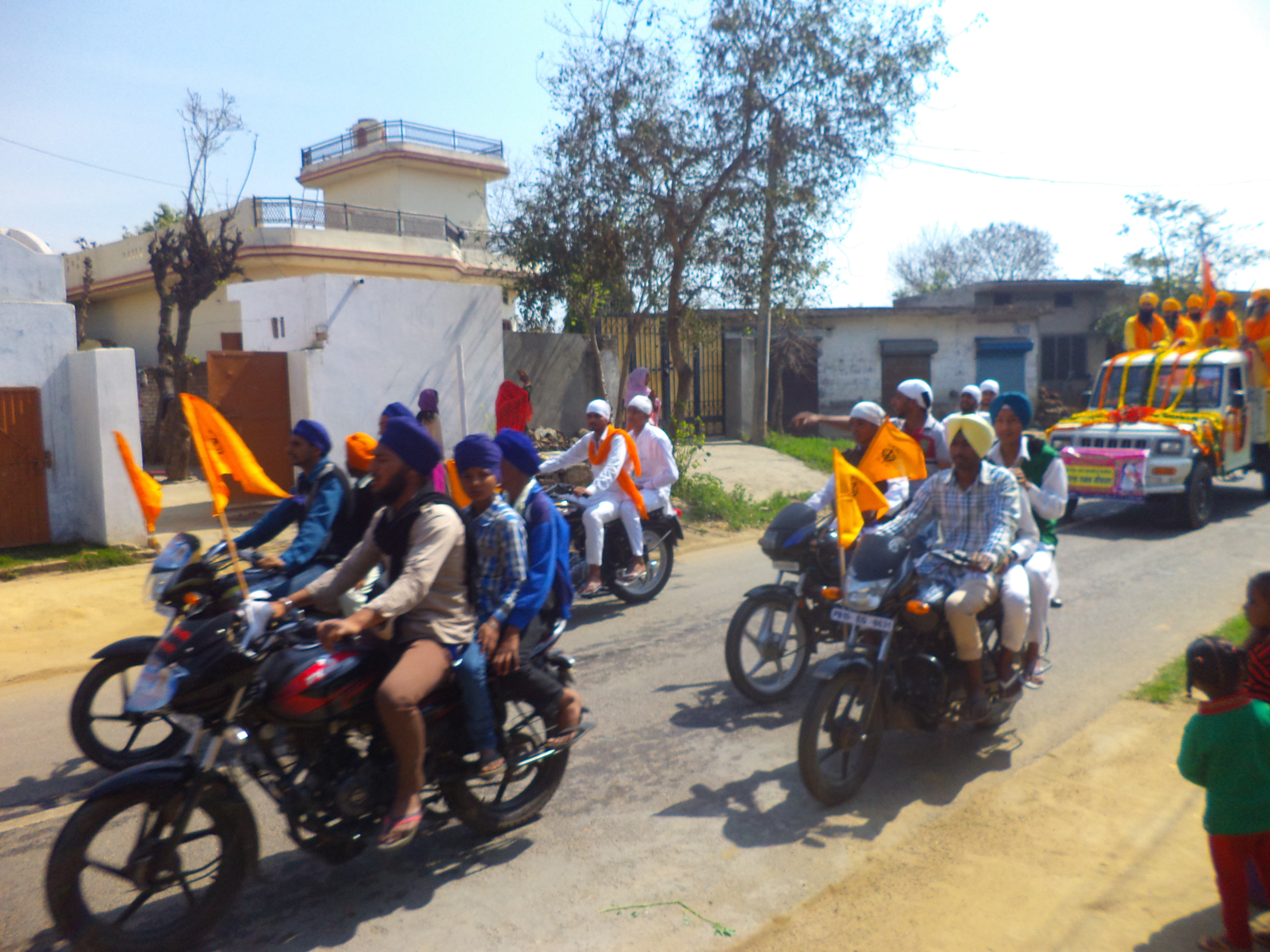
Nagar Kirtan from Jarg to Rara Sahib

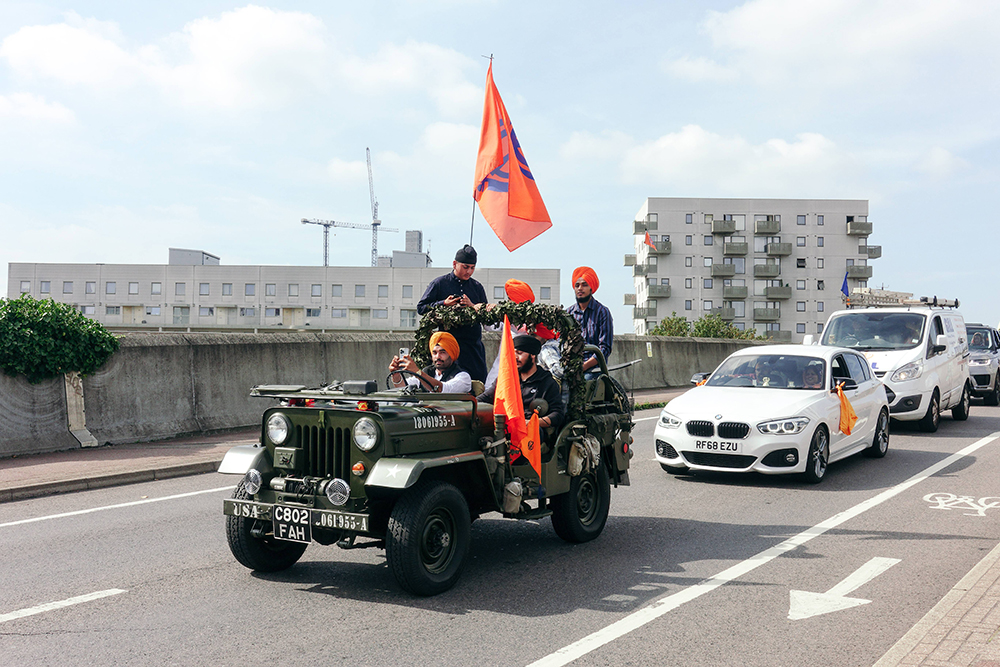
A Nagar Kirtan convoy in East London passes along the A124

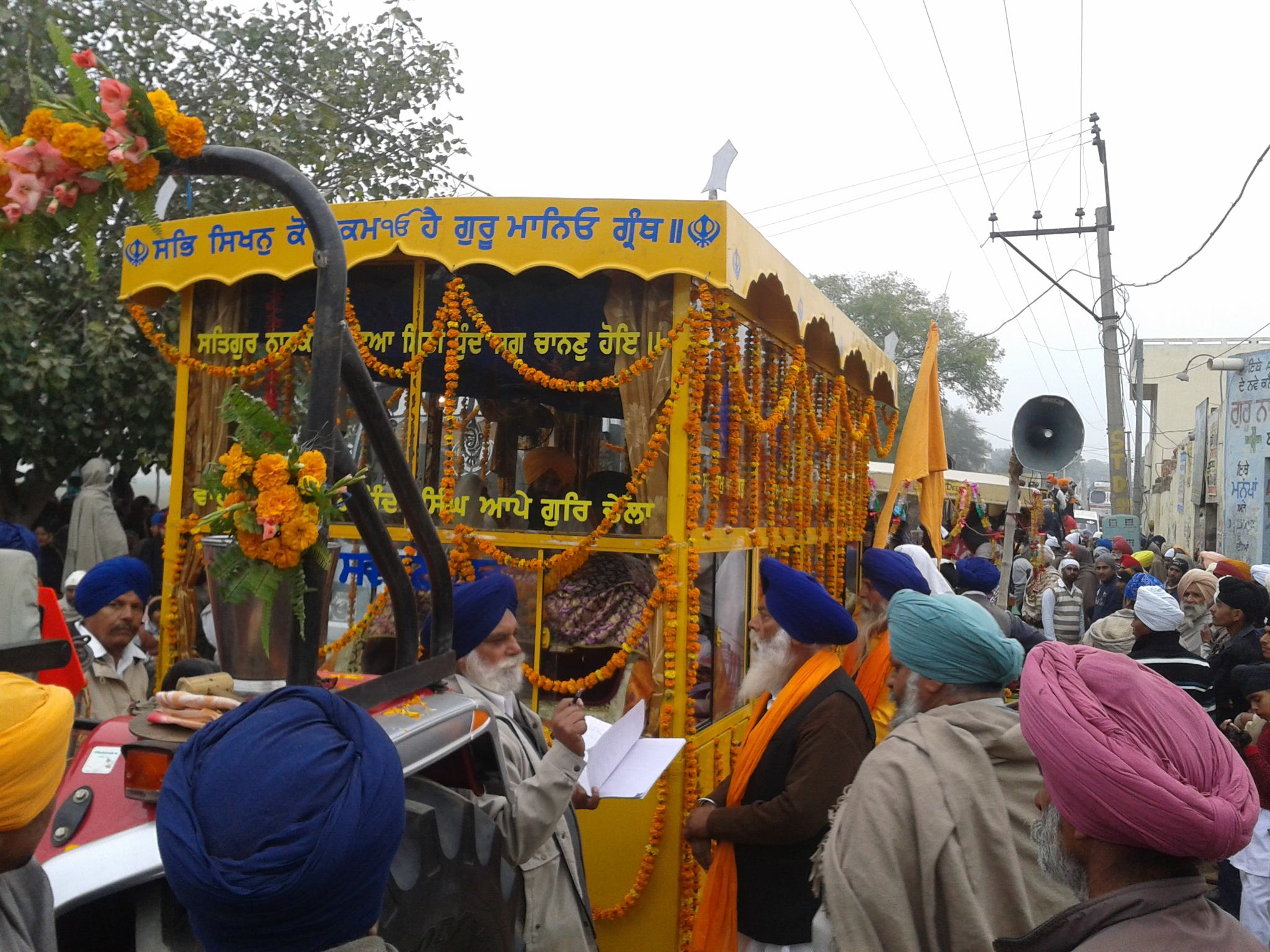
Nagar Kirtan at Thathi Bhai

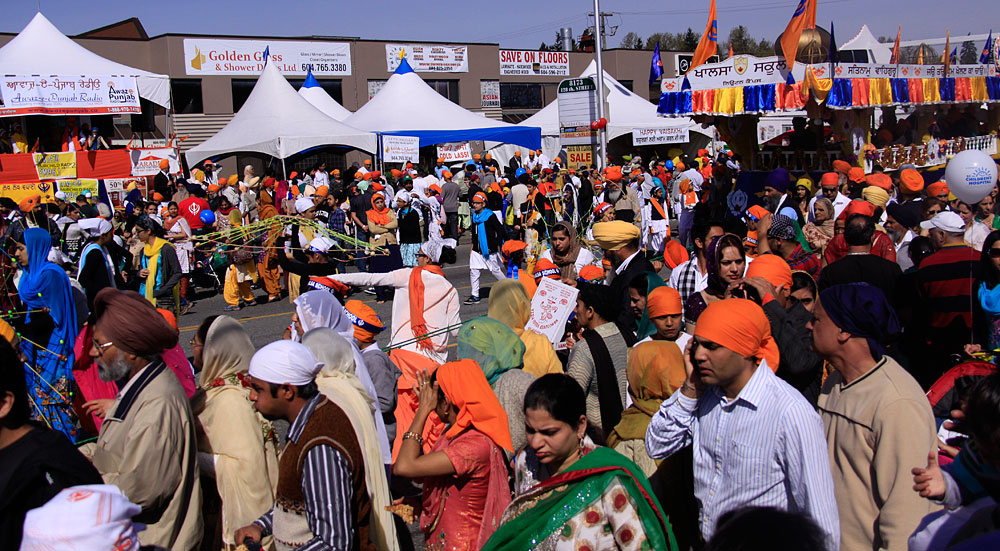
Nagar kirtan in Canada with kids practicing Gatka amongst crowd
Nagar Kirtans

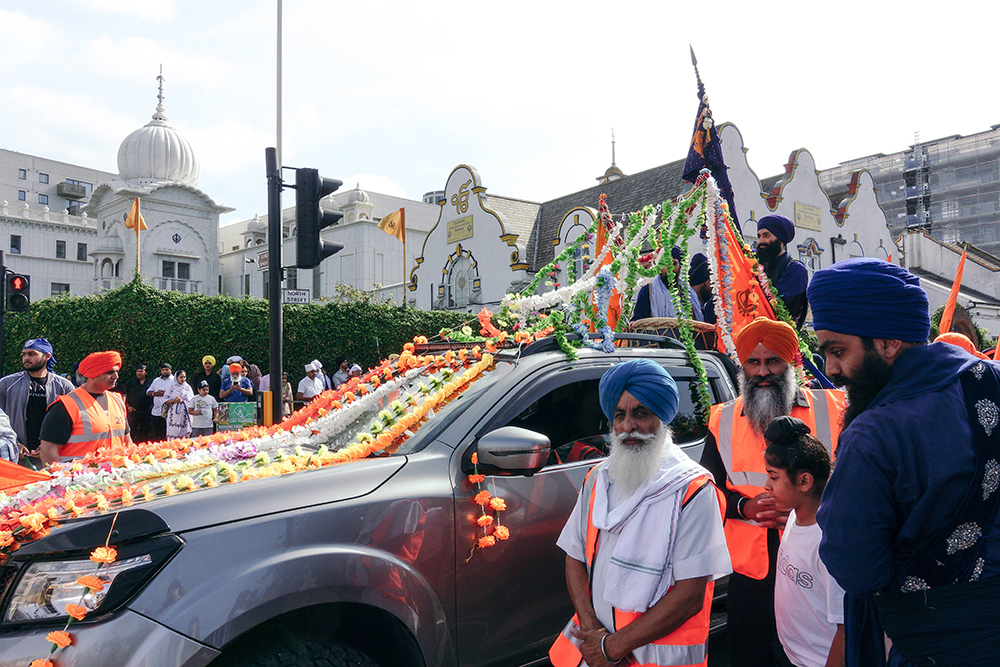
Nagar Kirtan Procession heads off from Gurdwara Singh Saba East London

Nagar Kirtan (Sanskrit: नगर कीर्तन; IAST: nāgara-kīrtana), or nagar sankirtan, is a tradition in the Indian religions involving the processional singing of holy hymns by a group in a residential area.

== Hinduism ==
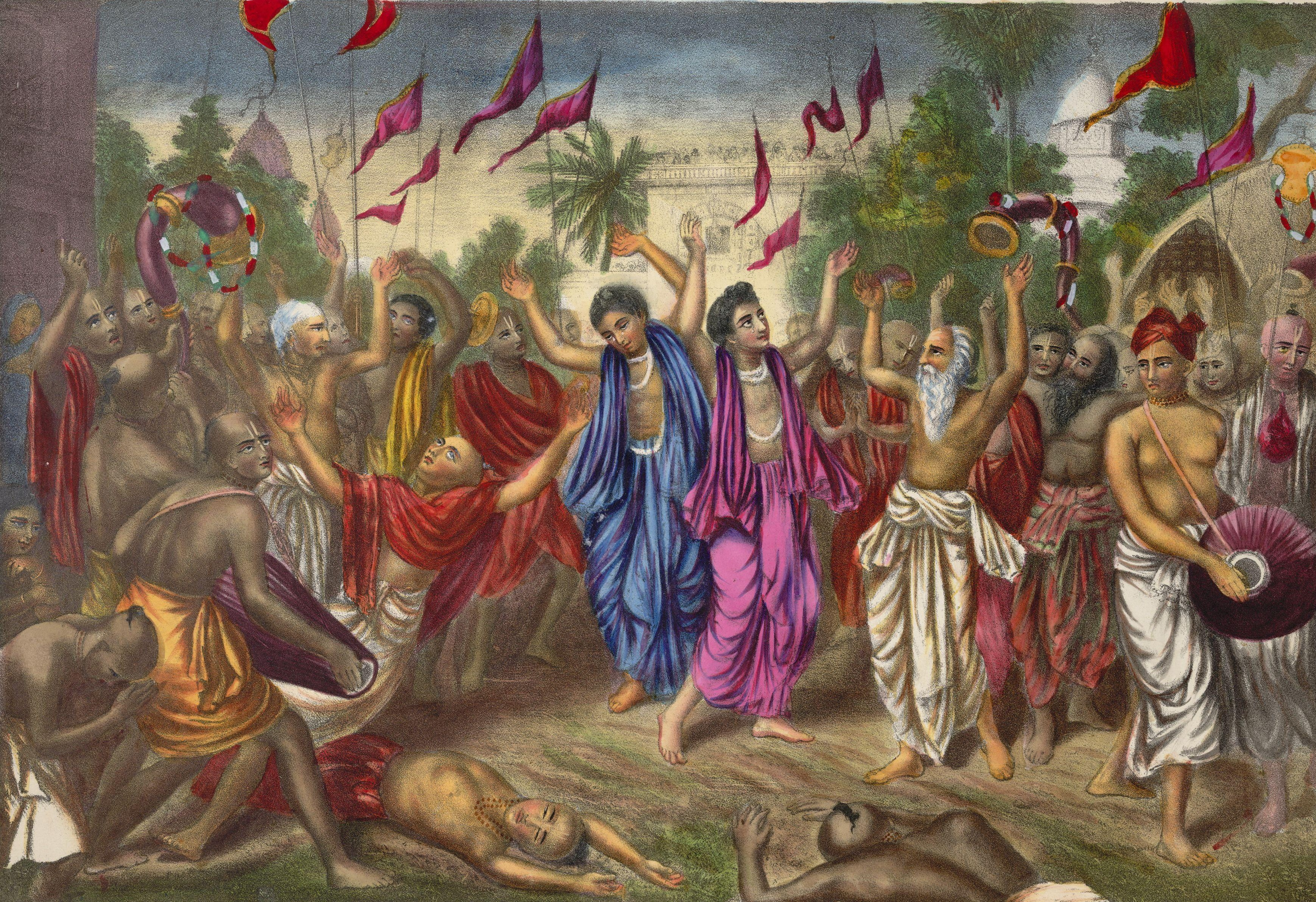
Nagar Kirtan of Chaitanya Mahaprabhu

In Hinduism, Bengali saint Chaitanya Mahaprabhu propagated ideas of bhakti, or devotion to a personal God, through kirtan (collective recitation of hymns) and nagar kirtan (kirtan the in form of religious processions), and is credited in the Vaishnava tradition with introduction of the custom. The congregational singing of Chaitanya was done to folk tunes and accompanied by the boisterous booming of drums and cymbals.

A February 2021 video of a nagar sankirtan at Sri Seetha Rama temple in Ashwathapura, Dakshina Kannada, by Raghu Leela School of Music went viral on social media with millions of views.

== Sikhism ==
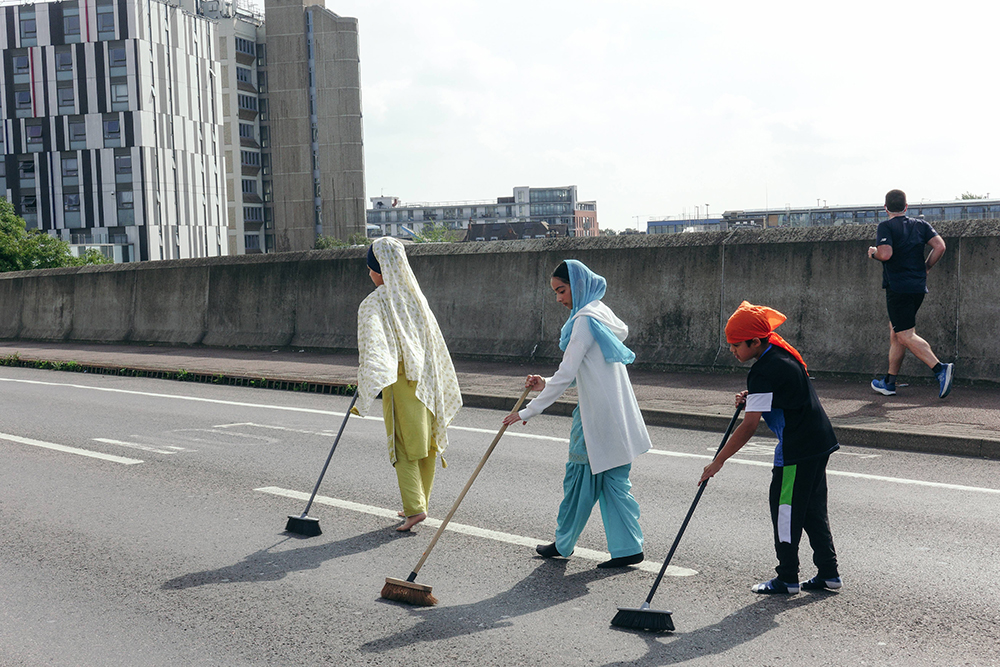
The road in front of a Nagar Kirtan procession in East London is swept clean as an act of Seva by members of the community.

Nagar Kirtan (Punjabi: ਨਗਰ-ਕੀਰਤਨ (Gurmukhi)), in Sikhism, is customary in the festival of Vaisakhi. Traditionally, the procession is led by the saffron-robed Panj Piare (the five beloved of the Guru), who are followed by the Guru Granth Sahib, the holy Sikh scripture, which is placed on a float.

Commonly, members of the procession are unshod in deference to the displayed scripture. Likewise, many cover their heads and don the colour saffron or orange. The road before the procession is cleared by Sewadars. Bystanders bow their heads to the scripture. Food may be provided to them from floats that follow the Scripture or from stationary points near the vicinity of the procession. The procession concludes at the Gurudwara with Ardas (prayer).

== See also ==
- Chaitnaya Mahaprabhu
- Vaishnavism
