= NH 107 =

NH 107 may refer to:

- National Highway 107 (India)
- New Hampshire Route 107, United States
