= National Highway 7 (India) =

National highway in India

National Highway 7
- Map of National Highway 7 in red
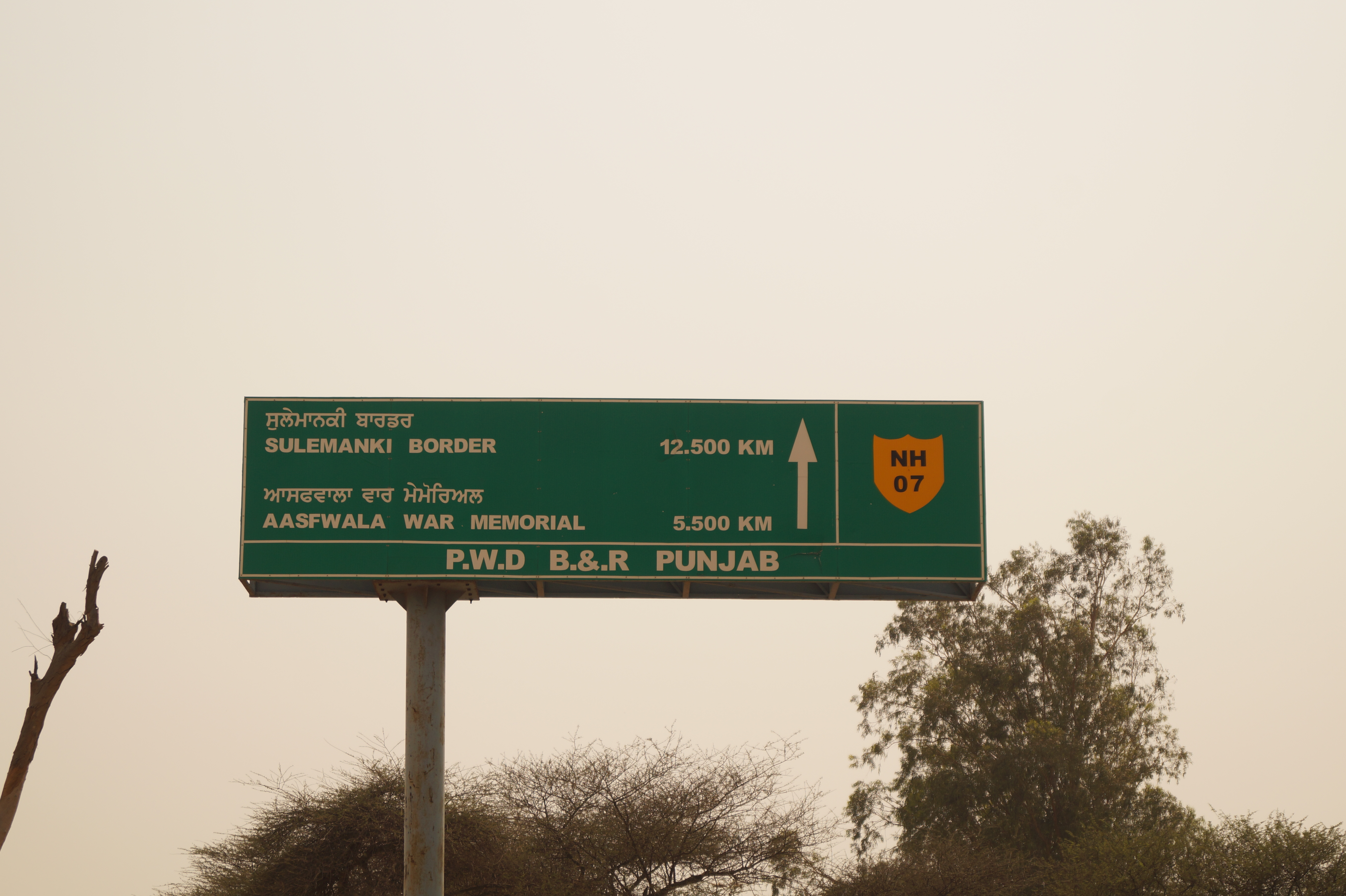
- New NH7 Signboard in Punjab

Route information
- Length: 845 km (525 mi)

Major junctions
- West end: Fazilka, Punjab
- East end: Mana Pass, Uttarakhand

Location
- Country: India
- States: Punjab, Haryana, Himachal Pradesh, Uttarakhand
- Primary destinations: Fazilka, Abohar, Malout, Giddarbaha, Bathinda, Rampura Phul, Sangrur, Patiala, Rajpura, Banur, Zirakpur, Panchkula, Naraingarh, Paonta Sahib, Herbertpur, Dehradun, Rishikesh, Devaprayag, Rudraprayag, Karnaprayag, Chamoli, Badrinath, Mana

Highway system
- Roads in India; Expressways; National; State; Asian
| ← NH 7 | → NH 7 |

National Highway 7 (NH 7) is a highway connecting Fazilka (Punjab) to Mana (Uttarakhand) in India. It passes through the Indian states of Punjab, Haryana, Himachal Pradesh, and Uttarakhand.

Schematic map of National Highways in India

The NH-7 (old NH-58) connects Hindu pilgrim centres of Rishikesh, Devprayag, Rudraprayag, Karnaprayag, Chamoli, Joshimath and Badrinath with Dehradun and Chandigarh. Pilgrims travelling to Sri Hemkunt Sahib take a diversion from Govindghat which lies on NH-7 between Joshimath and Badrinath.

The road is generally closed during the winter months of December, January, February and March in the upper reaches of the Himalayas through which National Highway 7 passes. This road goes to Mana Pass near the India-Tibetan border.

== Route ==
The route of national highway 7 transits through the states of Punjab, Haryana, Himachal Pradesh, and Uttarakhand in India. This national highway is about 845 km (525 mi) long.

=== Punjab ===
NH7 starts from India-Pakistan Border, connecting Fazilka, Abohar, Malout, Giddarbaha, Bathinda, Rampura Phul, Barnala, Sangrur, Patiala, Rajpura, Banur, Zirakpur, and up to Haryana border in the state of Punjab.

=== Haryana ===
NH7 links Panchkula near Zirakpur with Shahzadpur and Naraingarh in the state of Haryana.

=== Himachal Pradesh ===
NH7 links Kala Amb with Paonta Sahib in the state of Himachal Pradesh.

=== Uttarakhand ===
NH 7 connects Dehradun, Rishikesh, Devaprayag, Rudraprayag, Karnaprayag, Chamoli, Badrinath, Mana at Indo/Tibet border in the state of Uttarakhand.

== Junctions ==
Punjab
NH 62 near Abohar.
NH 9 near Malout
NH 354 near Malout
NH 754 near Bathinda
NH 54 near Bathinda
NH 254 near Rampura Phul
NH 703 near Barnala
NH 52 near Sangrur
NH 44 near Rajpura
NH 205A near Banur
NH 152 near Zirakpur
Haryana
NH 5 near Panchkula
NH 344 near Shahzadpur
Himachal Pradesh
NH 907A near Nahan
NH 907 near Paonta Sahib
NH 707 near Paonta Sahib
Uttarakhand
NH 507 near Herbertpur
NH 307 near Dehradun
NH 34 near Rishikesh
NH 707A near Maletha
NH 309 near Srinagar
NH 107 near Rudraprayag
NH 109 near Karnaprayag
NH 107A near Chamoli.

Termination point is near Mana village at an elevation of about 3200 m.
