= Thathi Bhai =

- village
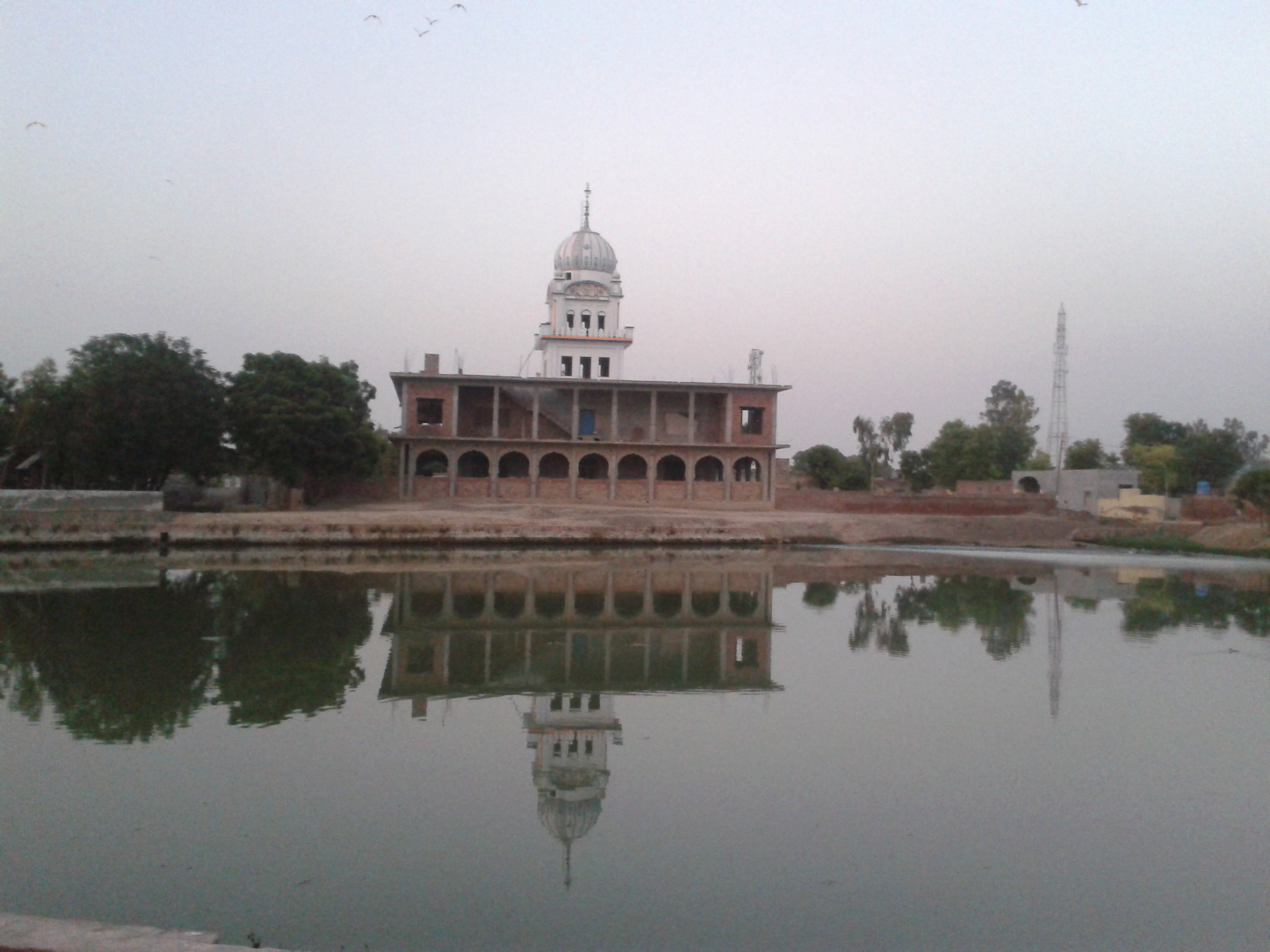
- Rear View of the Gurdwara Sri Hargobind Sahib(under construction in 2012) in village Thathi Bhai, Moga.

- Location in Punjab, India Thathi Bhai (India)
- Coordinates: 30.562649°N 75.028918°E
- Country: India
- State: Punjab
- Region: Punjab
- District: Moga
- Talukas: Bagha Purana
- Elevation: 185 m (607 ft)

Population (2010)
  - Total: 4,889

Languages
  - Official: Punjabi (Gurmukhi)
  - Regional: Malwai
- Time zone: UTC+5:30 (IST)
- PIN: 142049
- Telephone code: 01636-244***
- Vehicle registration: PB69
- Nearest city: Bagha Purana

Thathi Bhai is a village in Tehsil Bagha Purana, District Moga in Punjab, India.

== Location ==
Thathi Bhai lies in-between small towns Kotkapura and Bagha Purana. It acts as merging point for bus routes from Kotkapura, Moga (via Bagha Purana) and Bathinda (via Bargari or Bhagta Bhai ka).

Thathi Bhai (Punjabi: ਠੱਠੀ ਭਾਈ) is located at the Moga-Bathinda and Moga-Faridkot district border-line, so it is distanced about same from Moga and Bathinda i.e. 32 km and 45 km respectively. Thathi Bhai falls under Bagha Purana tehsil.

Thathi Bhai resides in Tehsil Bagha Purana and comes under 'Halka' Bagha Purana during elections as well, and Darshan Singh is current MLA from halka Bagha Purana.

== Religion and caste ==
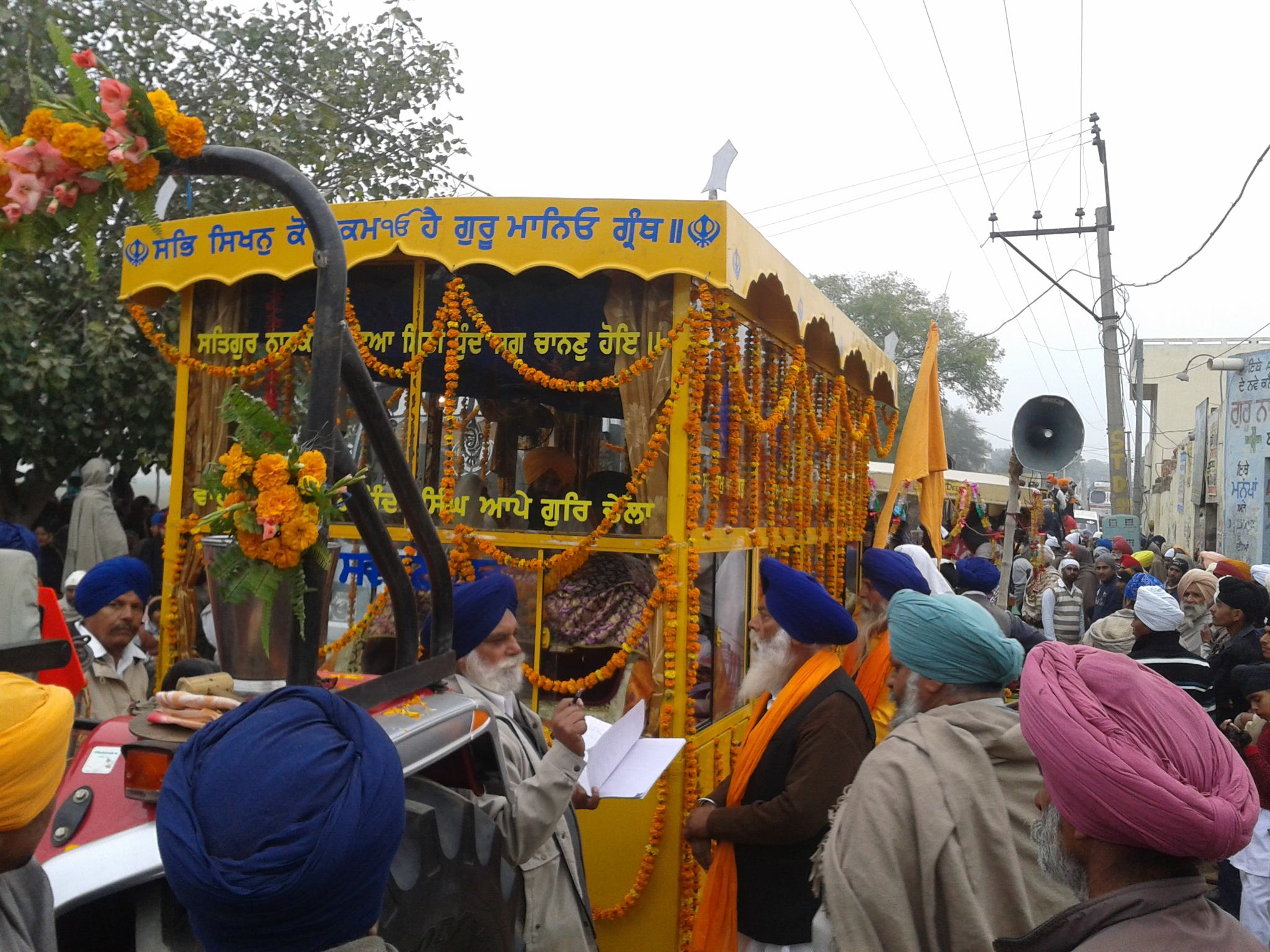
Nagar Kirtan, A ceremony performed on annual basis in village Thathi Bhai, Moga

Former name of this village was Thath Ram Singh. It was founded by Baba Bhag Singh Great grandson of Baba Bhai Roop Chand Ji on name of his uncle Bhai Ram Singh Grandson of Baba Bhai Roop Chand Ji in the year 1723. Also he planted a Jand tree as the Modhi of the village that exists in the Jand wali dharamshala of the village. For the purpose of increasing the population of the village, they invited other castes like as Jatt-Sikhs, Mahjans, Mistari, Chimba Sikhs, chumar and few others to live in Thathi Bhai. The lands for living and agriculture were divided by Bhai Ka's i.e. the founder families. The village has a Founders memorial place for Baba Bhai Kahan Singh Ji and Baba Bhai Kesar Singh Ji Zaildaar of area 1850's. The Bhai Ka family also play an important role as the Numberdar of the village

Total population of village as recorded in 2010 is about Five Thousand . The people in the village are predominantly Sikhs.

== About the village ==
The Village has 3 Government schools (1 Government Senior Secondary School and 2 Government Primary Schools) and a Private public school named Guru Nanak Public School, Gurdwara Sahib, Vishvkarma Temple and Dera sahib, Civil Medical hospital and a Civil Veterinary dispensary, drug stores, youth clubs for development of village, Nestle Dairy station/center, a petrol pump. Although Agriculture is main profession for people to earn for their lives, a number of people are Government employees working as Teachers and Policemen etc.

A significant demographic in Thathi Bhai is the Cheema Jatt clan, which constitutes approximately 30% of the village population. The Cheema families maintain a historical and spiritual gathering site known locally as the Bakhuha (ਬਖੂਆ). While the original foundational building has been preserved, the surrounding area has been modernized into a community space featuring poured concrete seating and cultivated gardens. The Bakhuha serves as a focal point for the clan's heritage, particularly during the festival of Diwali, when families gather at the site to light candles and earthen lamps (diyas) in a collective expression of gratitude.

Recently a public library named Manav Chetna Library has been installed above Namdev Bhavan (ਨਾਮਦੇਵ ਭਵਨ). Apart from that village has two dharmshala's (Inn), one main dharmshala and other Kingra JattSikh's dharmshala, one panchayat bhawan.

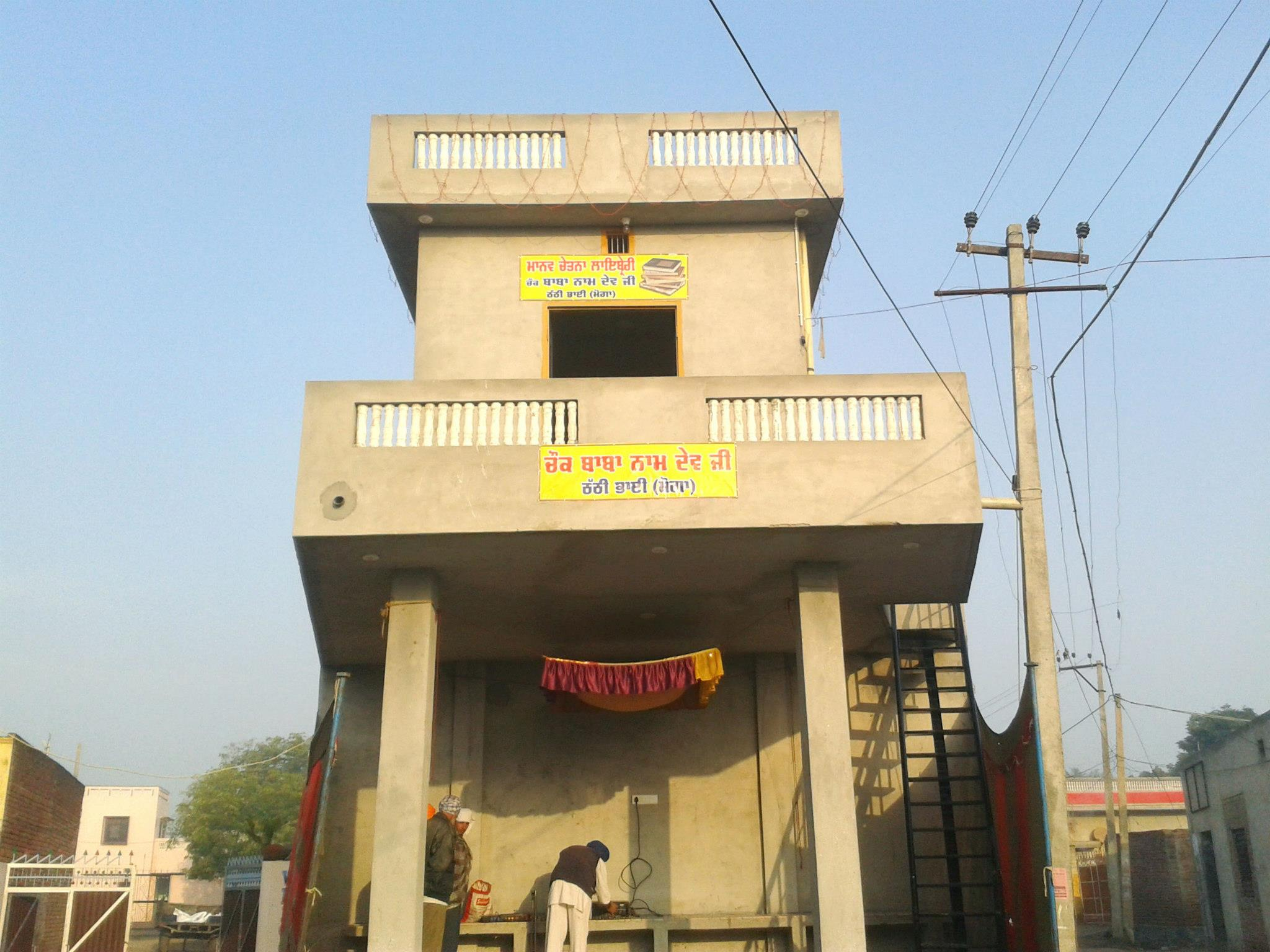
Public Library in village Thathi Bhai

Mrs Simarpreet kaur is the present day Sarpanch of the Village.

== Sports and other activities ==
Village has its own sports club that includes a playground and gym. The most commonly played games are cricket, volleyball and kabaddi. Thathi Bhai also has a cricket club, the Thathi Bhai cricket club, a volleyball team and kabaddi team. Every year at occasion of Vaisakhi, village hosts a Volleyball tournament in which teams from villages nearby are invited to compete .

Teams from the village have participated in State Level Science Congress held in Chandigarh on multiple occasions.

Bhagwan Singh Gill, an athlete from the village, recently made national news after winning bronze medal (rowing) in the Asian Games.
