= National Highway 505A (India) =

National highway in India

National Highway 505A
- Map of the National Highway in red

Route information
- Auxiliary route of NH 5
- Length: 20 km (12 mi)

Major junctions
- North end: Powari
- South end: Kalpa

Location
- Country: India
- States: Himachal Pradesh

Highway system
- Roads in India; Expressways; National; State; Asian
← NH 5	→ NH 505A

National Highway 505A, commonly referred to as NH 505A is a national highway in India. It is a spur road of National Highway 5. NH-505A traverses the state of Himachal Pradesh in India.

== Route ==
Powari - Reckong Peo - Kalpa.

== Junctions ==
NH 5 Terminal near Powari.

== See also ==
- List of national highways in India
- List of national highways in India by state
