= National Highway 205A (India) =

National highway in India

National Highway 205A
- Map of the National Highway in red

Route information
- Length: 40 km (25 mi)

Major junctions
- North end: Kharar
- South end: Tepla

Location
- Country: India
- States: Punjab

Highway system
- Roads in India; Expressways; National; State; Asian
← NH 5	→ NH 44

National Highway 205A, commonly referred to as NH 205A, is a national highway in India. It is a spur road of National Highway 5. NH-205A traverses the state of Punjab in India.

== Route ==
Kharar - Banur - Tepla.

== Junctions ==
NH 5 Terminal near Kharar.

NH 7 Terminal near Banur.: NH 44 Terminal near Tepla.

== See also ==
- Ambala-Mohali-Kurali Expressway
- List of national highways in India
- List of national highways in India by state
