= National Highway 954 (India) =

National Highway in India

National Highway 954
- Map of National Highway 954 in red

Route information
- Auxiliary route of NH 54
- Length: 44.6 km (27.7 mi)

Major junctions
- South end: Pakka Saharana
- North end: Kaluwala

Location
- Country: India
- States: Rajasthan

Highway system
- Roads in India; Expressways; National; State; Asian
← NH 54	→ NH 62

National Highway 954, commonly referred to as NH 954 is a national highway in India. It is a spur road of National Highway 54. NH-954 runs in the state of Rajasthan in India.

== Route ==
NH 954 connects Pakka Saharana, Morjanda Khari, Mamakhera, Lalgarh Jattan, Banwala, 4LNP and Kaluwala in the state of Rajasthan.

== Junctions ==
NH 54 Terminal near Pakka Saharaha.
NH 62 Terminal near Kaluwala.

== See also ==
- List of national highways in India
- List of national highways in India by state
