= Pakka Saharana =

Village in Rajasthan, India

Coordinates: 29.67955°N 74.16050°E

Pakka Saharana is a village of the Hanumangarh district in Rajasthan state of western India. The town of Hanumangarh is the district headquarters. Pucca Saarna divided into two chaks - 24 LLW-A & 24 LLW-B and the total population of this village is approx 10000.

== Village Profile ==
The village is located in the extreme north of Rajasthan. The major work of the village is farming; major crops include bajra, cotton, wheat, and vegetables.

Earlier it was in Sri Ganganagar District and then came in Hanumangarh when Hanumangarh was made as district on 12 July 1994 from Sri Ganganagar district because Earlier Hanumangarh was one of the Tehsils of Sri Ganganagar district. Punjab National Bank and Rajasthan Marudhara Gramin Bank fulfills all the banking needs of the village.

== Education ==
The village has 2 Government Higher Secondary Schools separately for Boys and Girls, one Government Middle School and two Government Primary Schools. There are also a number of Non Government Schools for Middle, and Secondary Education.

== Schools ==
- Govt. Sr. Secondary School
- Govt. Sr. Secondary School (Girls)
- Govt. Primary School
- Govt. Middle School
- Govt. Primary School, 24 LLW-B
- Vishwa Bharti Bal Mandir Senior Secondary school, 24 LLW-B
- MDS Senior Secondary School

== Hospitals ==
- Govt. Community Health Centre
- Govt. Ayurvedic Health Centre
- Govt. Veterinary Hospital

== Language ==
Bagri, a dialect of Rajasthani language, is spoken by majority of population. Hindi and Punjabi are also in use in this village.

== How to Reach ==
Pakka Saharana is located at 18 km far from Hanumangarh and 42 km. From Sri Ganganagar. RSRTC provides Public Transit through the village in every 7 Minutes approximately. Nearest Inter State Bus Terminus in Hanumangarh. The Village has access to the nearest local railway station Hirnawali and Inter State Railway Station is Hanumangarh. Direct bus services available from most major cities like Delhi, Jaipur, Udaipur, Kota etc. (ask for departing city to Sri Ganganagar via Hanumangarh route.) One can take direct bus to Delhi, Jaipur, Udaipur, Kota etc. from the village.

NH54 (National Highway No 54) crossing this village and NH954 (National Highway No 954) starting from this village.
