= National Highway 907A (India) =

National highway in India

National Highway 907A
- Map of the National Highway in red

Route information
- Length: 75 km (47 mi)

Major junctions
- East end: Nahan
- West end: Kumarhatti

Location
- Country: India
- States: Himachal Pradesh

Highway system
- Roads in India; Expressways; National; State; Asian
← NH 7	→ NH 5

National Highway 907A, commonly called NH 907A is a national highway in India. It is a branch of National Highway 7. NH-907A traverses the state of Himachal Pradesh in India.

== Route ==
Nahan- Sarahan - Kumarhatti .

== Junctions ==
NH 7 Terminal near Nahan.
NH 5 Terminal near Kumarhatti.

== See also ==
- List of national highways in India
- List of national highways in India by state
