= National Highway 107A (India) =

National Highway in India

National Highway 107A
- Map of National Highway 107A in red

Route information
- Length: 85 km (53 mi)

Major junctions
- South end: Chamoli
- North end: Baramwari

Location
- Country: India
- States: Uttarakhand

Highway system
- Roads in India; Expressways; National; State; Asian
← NH 7	→ NH 107

National Highway 107A, commonly called NH 107A is a national highway in India. It is a spur road of National Highway 7. NH-107A traverses the state of Uttarakhand in India.

== Route ==
Chamoli, Gopeshwar, Mandal Okhimath, Baramwari.

== Junctions ==
NH 7 Terminal near Chamoli.
NH 107 Terminal near Baramwari.

== See also ==
- List of national highways in India
- List of national highways in India by state
