= National Highway 5 (India) =

National highway in North India

National Highway 5
- Map of the National Highway in red
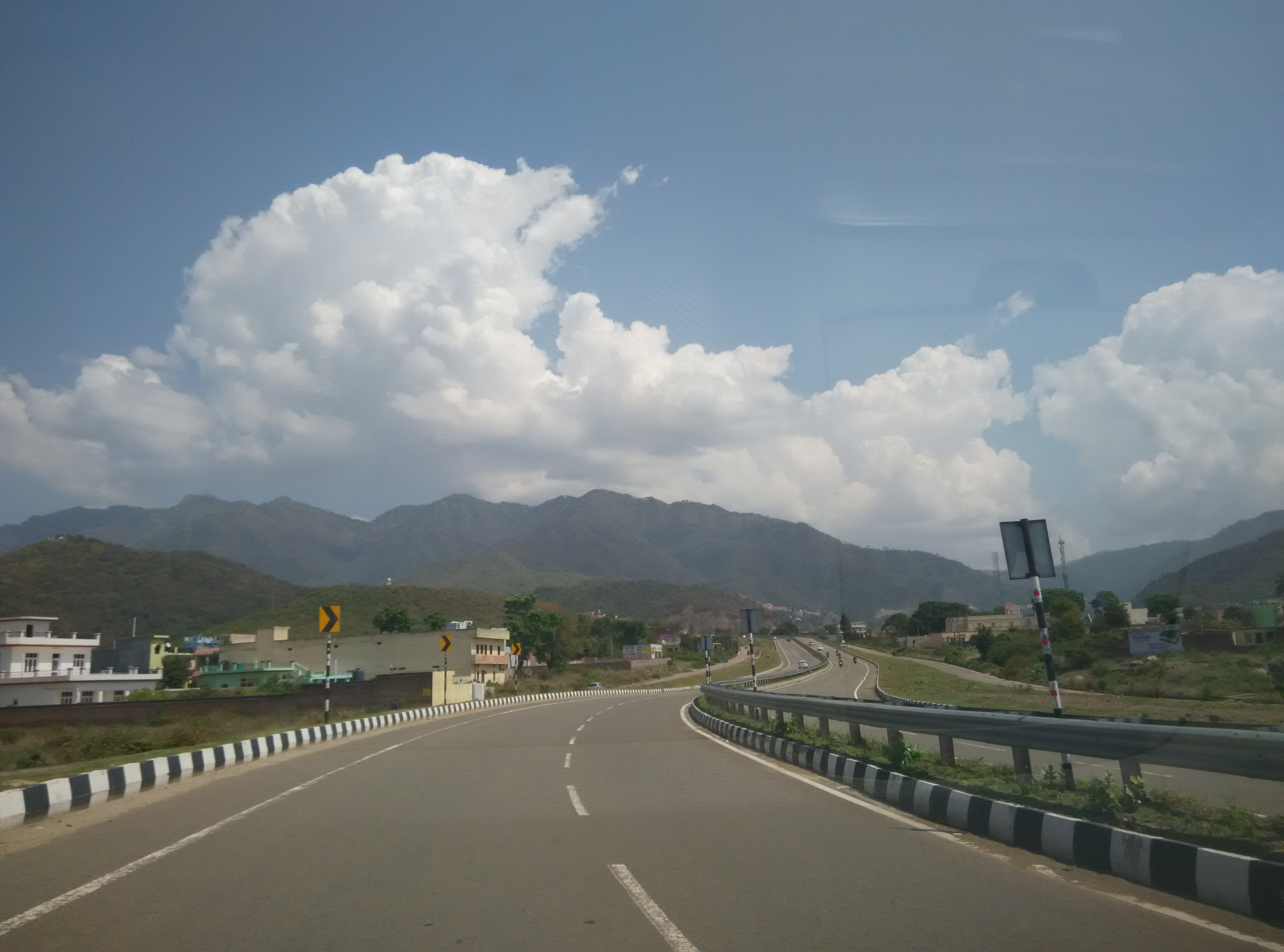
- Himalayan Expressway, part of NH-5 approaching Shivalik hills on the way to Shimla

Route information
- Maintained by NHAI
- Length: 660.2 km (410.2 mi)

Major junctions
- West end: Firozpur
- East end: Shipki La, Sino-Indian border

Location
- Country: India
- States: Punjab, Chandigarh, Haryana, Himachal Pradesh
- Primary destinations: Moga, Jagraon, Ludhiana, Mohali, Chandigarh, Panchkula, Kalka, Solan, Shimla, Theog, Narkanda, Kumarsain, Rampur, Chini

Highway system
- Roads in India; Expressways; National; State; Asian
← NH 4	→ NH 105

National Highway 5 (NH5) is a primary national highway in India, running from West to East, connecting Firozpur in Punjab to the Sino-Indian border at Shipki La. The highway passes through Moga, Jagraon, Ludhiana, Mohali, Chandigarh, Panchkula, Kalka, Solan, Shimla, Theog, Narkanda, Kumarsain, Rampur Bushahr and continues along the Sutlej River till its terminus near the Tibet border.

== Route ==
Schematic map of National Highways in India

NH5 traverses the states of Punjab, Haryana, Himachal Pradesh and union territory of Chandigarh in India.

=== Punjab ===
Firozpur, Moga, Jagraon, Ludhiana, Kharar, Morinda, Mohali - Chandigarh border

=== Chandigarh ===
Punjab border at Mohali, exits at Zirakpur in Punjab

=== Punjab ===
Zirakpur - Haryana border

=== Haryana ===
Punjab border - Panchkula, Surajpur, Pinjore, Kalka bypass - H.P. border

=== Himachal Pradesh ===
Haryana border - Parwanoo, Solan, Shimla, Theog, Narkanda, Kumarsain, Rampur Bushahr, Chini, Shipki La at Sino-Indian border

This section contains the Himalayan Expressway, which was damaged by floods and landslides in 2023. Geologists argue that highway construction had destabilized the slopes and left the area vulnerable to landslides.

== Junctions ==
NH 354 near Firozpur.
NH 354B near Firozpur
NH 54 near Talwandi Bhai
NH 105B near Moga
NH 703 near Moga
NH 44 near Doraha
NH 205 near Kharar
NH 205A near Kharar
NH 152 near Zirakpur
NH 7 near Zirakpur
NH 105 near Pinjore
NH 907A near Kumarhatti
NH 205 near Shimla
NH 705 near Theog
NH 305 near Sainj
NH 505A near Powari
NH 505 near Khab.

== See also ==
- List of national highways in India
- List of national highways in India by state
