= National Highway 754 (India) =

National highway in India

National Highway 754
- Map of the National Highway in red

Route information
- Length: 78 km (48 mi)

Major junctions
- East end: Bathinda
- West end: Jalalabad

Location
- Country: India
- States: Punjab

Highway system
- Roads in India; Expressways; National; State; Asian
← NH 54	→ NH 54

National Highway 754, commonly referred to as NH 754 is a national highway in India. It is a spur road of National Highway 54. NH-754 traverses the state of Punjab in India.

== Route ==
Bathinda - Muktsar - Jalalabad.

== Junctions ==
NH 54 Terminal near Bathinda.
NH 354 near Muktsar.

== See also ==
- List of national highways in India
- List of national highways in India by state
