= National Highway 707A (India) =

National Highway in India

National Highway 707A
- Map of the National Highway in red
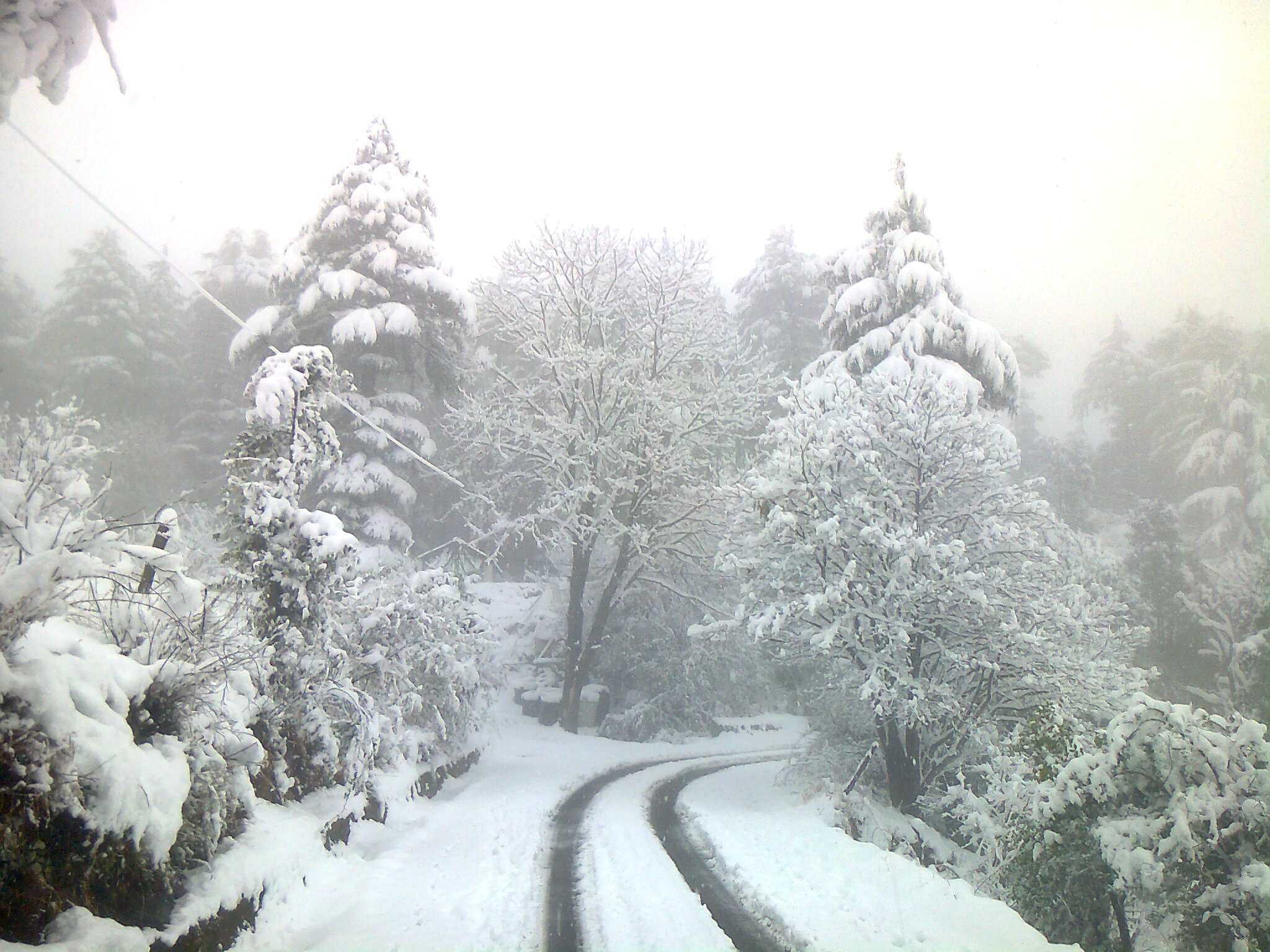
- NH in Dhanaulti area

Route information
- Auxiliary route of NH 7
- Existed: 31 March 2015–present

Major junctions
- North end: Tiuni
- South end: Srinagar

Location
- Country: India
- States: Uttarakhand

Highway system
- Roads in India; Expressways; National; State; Asian
← NH 707	→ NH 7

National Highway 707A, commonly referred to as NH 707A is a national highway in India. It is a spur road of National Highway 7. NH-707A traverses the state of Uttarakhand in India connecting National Highway 7 with National Highway 34.

== Route ==
NH707A connects Tiuni, Chakrata, Bhediyana, Mussoorie, Dhanaulti, Chamba, New Tehri and Maletha near Srinagar in the state of Uttarakhand. covering 324 kilometres (201 mi)

== Junctions ==
NH 707 Terminal near Tiuni.
NH 34 near New Tehri.
NH 7 at Maletha near Srinagar.

== See also ==
- List of national highways in India
- List of national highways in India by state
