= Bagha Purana =

- small town
- Location in Punjab, India Bagha Purana (India)
- Coordinates: 30.6833°N 75.1°E
- Country: India
- State: Punjab
- District: Moga

Population (2011)
  - Total: 25,206

Languages
  - Official: Punjabi
- Time zone: UTC+5:30 (IST)
- PIN: 142038
- Telephone code: 01636
- Vehicle registration: PB-69
- Website: www.baghapurana.com

Bagha Purana is a town and a municipal council in the Moga district which is about 21 km away from Moga city in the state of Punjab. It is a town in the heart of Punjab’s Malwa region. The town acts as a major centre point connecting major cities of Malwa region.

== History ==
Bagha Purana was historically a small settlement consisting primarily of three ‘‘pattis’’ (localities): Bagha Patti, Purana Patti and Mughlu Patti. The settlement developed at the intersection of the Moga–Kotkapura road and the Mudki–Nihal Singh Wala road. Its location at this road junction contributed to its growth as a trading centre serving the surrounding agricultural villages."Master Plan of Local Planning Area, Bagha Purana" (PDF). Punjab Urban Planning and Development Authority.

Until the early 1970s, Bagha Purana remained predominantly a village. As commercial activity and settlement increased, it gradually developed into a small town. In 1978, a ‘‘Nagar Panchayat’’ was constituted, formally giving Bagha Purana urban status. It was subsequently upgraded to a Municipal Council."Master Plan of Local Planning Area, Bagha Purana" (PDF). Punjab Urban Planning and Development Authority.

Following the creation of Moga district in 1995, the administrative importance of Bagha Purana increased. On 31 December 1997, 57 villages were separated from the existing Moga and Nihal Singh Wala subdivisions and a new Bagha Purana tehsil/subdivision was created, with Bagha Purana as its headquarters.Punjab District Gazetteers: Moga. Department of Revenue, Rehabilitation and Disaster Management, Government of Punjab. The establishment of the subdivision resulted in the development of tehsil-level government offices in the town.

By the beginning of the 21st century, Bagha Purana had developed from a small rural settlement into one of the principal urban and commercial centres of Moga district. Its growth has remained closely associated with its location on regional road corridors and its role as a market and service centre for the surrounding agricultural region."Master Plan of Local Planning Area, Bagha Purana" (PDF). Punjab Urban Planning and Development Authority.

== Town ==
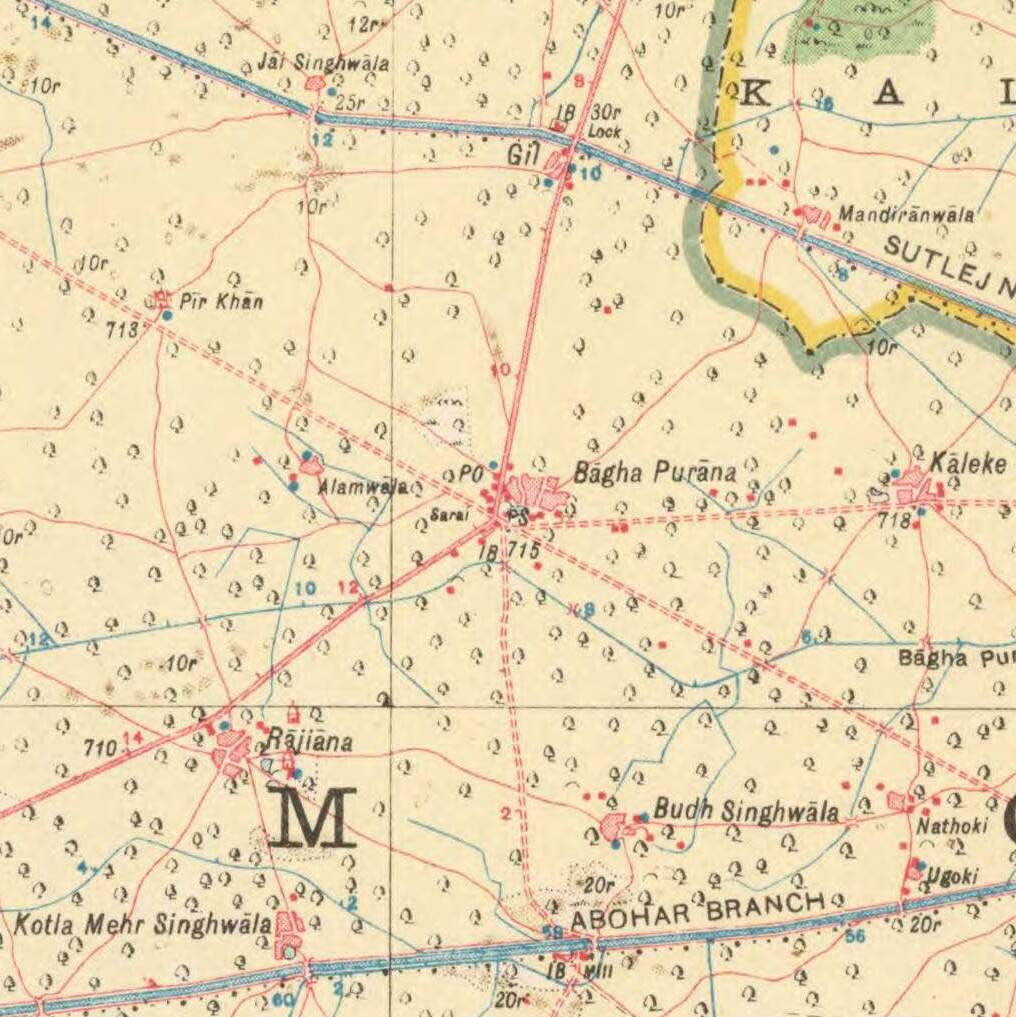
Bagha Purana town in Moga tehsil, Survey of India geographical block-map for 44 N NW Ferozepore (1921)

Bagha Purana lies on the main road connecting Moga and Faridkot and thus is a major hub for buses to all across Punjab. BaghaPurana's police station has the largest jurisdiction in Punjab as a chain of over 65 "pinds" or villages are within its control. The town is divided into 3 'pattis' or sections: Muglu Patti (biggest one), Bagha Patti, and Purana Patti. The town has its fair share of rich people and thus the standard of living is above average as compared to the surrounding towns and villages.

== Demographics ==
As of 2011, Bagha Purana has population, of 15,206, of which 8,288 are male and 7,918 are female.

Bagha Purana is approximately 30 km from Kotkapura, 55 km from Barnala, 20 km from Nihal Singh Wala, 25 km from Mudki, 21 km from Bhagta Bhai Ka, 50 km from Rampura Phul, 55 km from Bathinda and 33 km from Faridkot.

                                                                                                                                                      Wadda Ghar, Kotla Rai ka, Alamwala Kalan, Gill, Kaleke, Nathoke, Budh-Singh Wala, Kotla Mehar Singh Wala, Gholia Kalan, Rajiana, Samalsar, Rode, Gill, Chandpurana, sangat pura, Channuwala are some of the nearby villages.

== Gallery ==
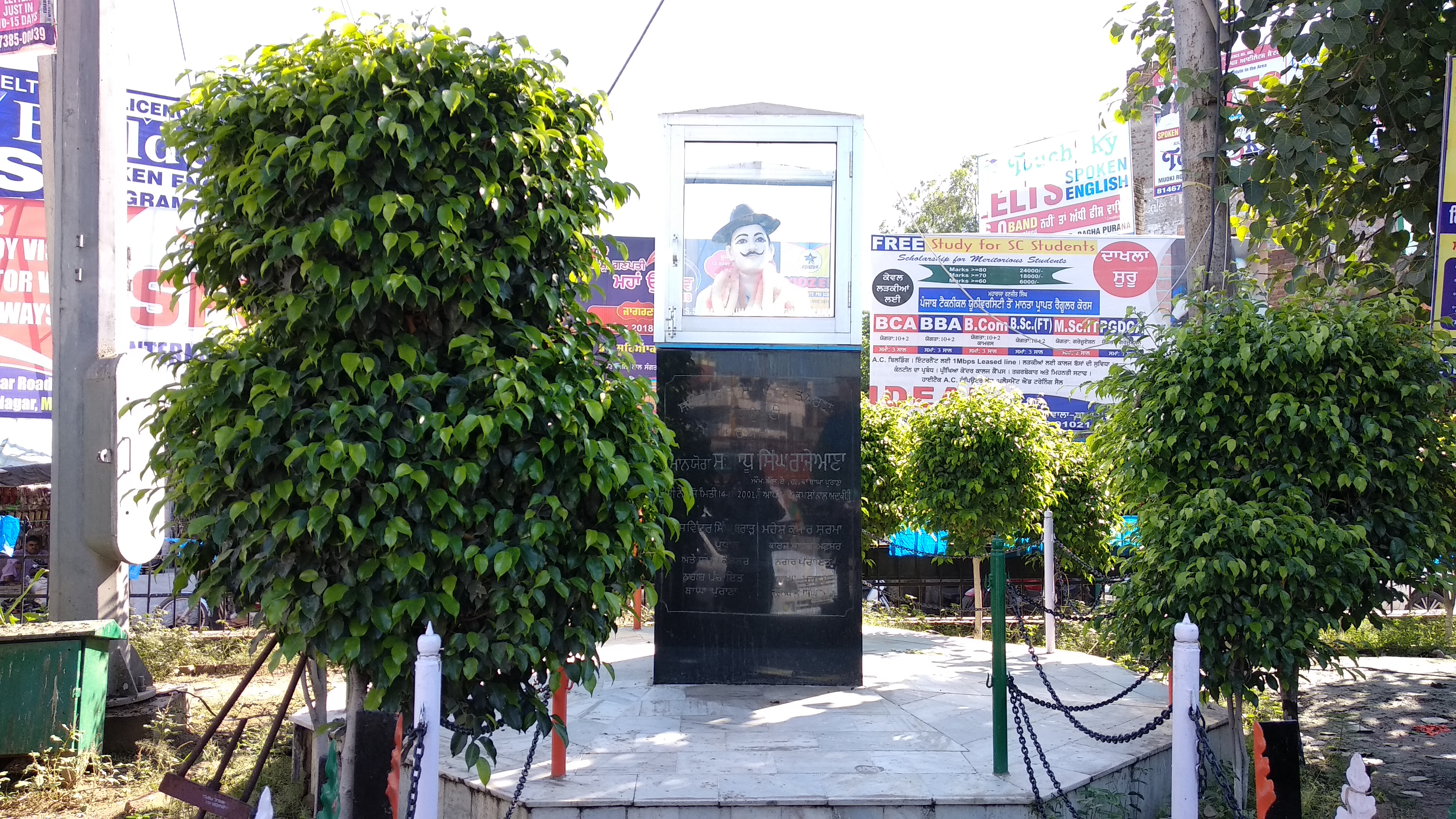
Bhagat Singh's Statue at Bagha Purana Chowk

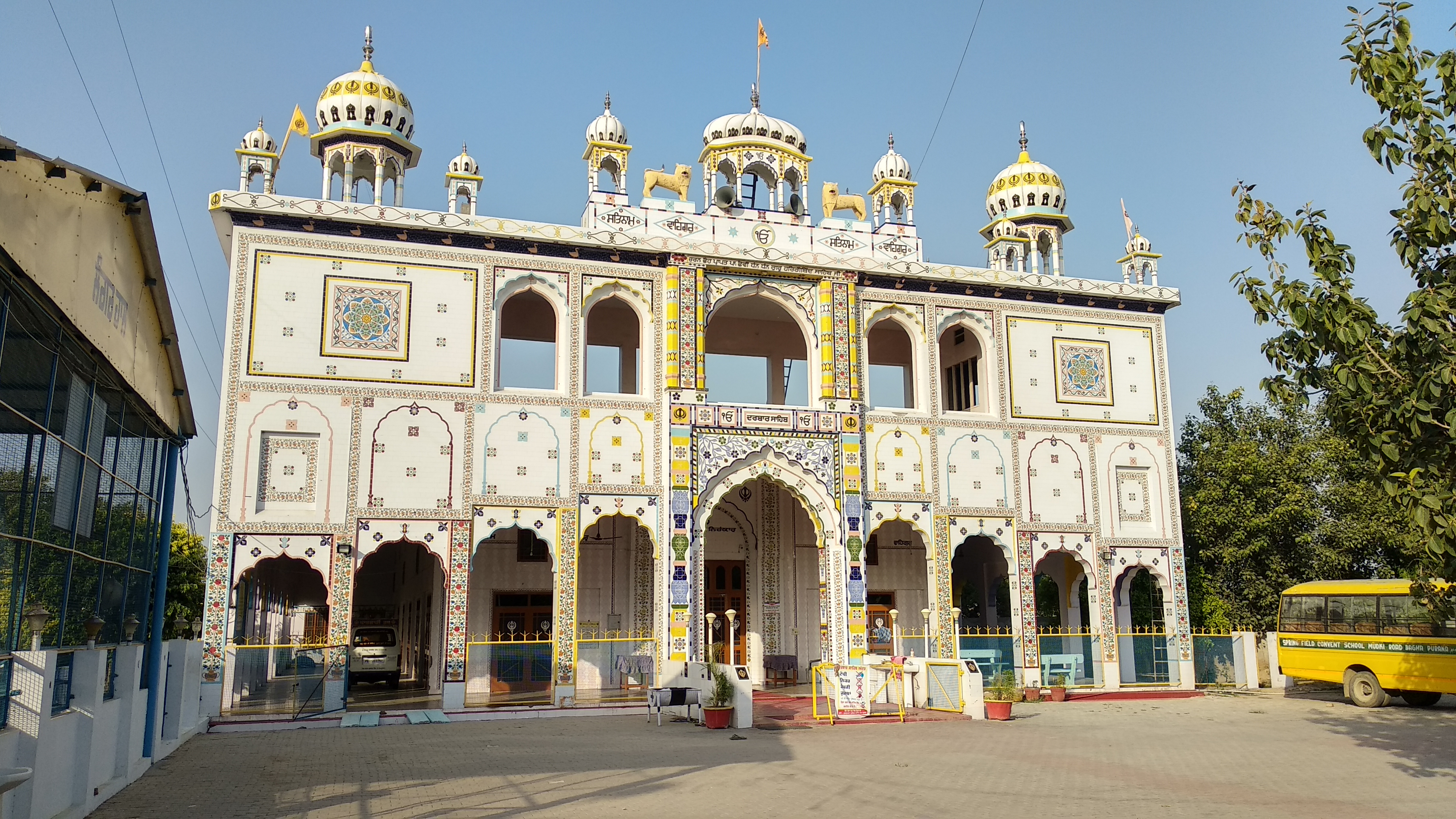
Gurduwara Sant Baba Gurmel Singh, Bagha Purna

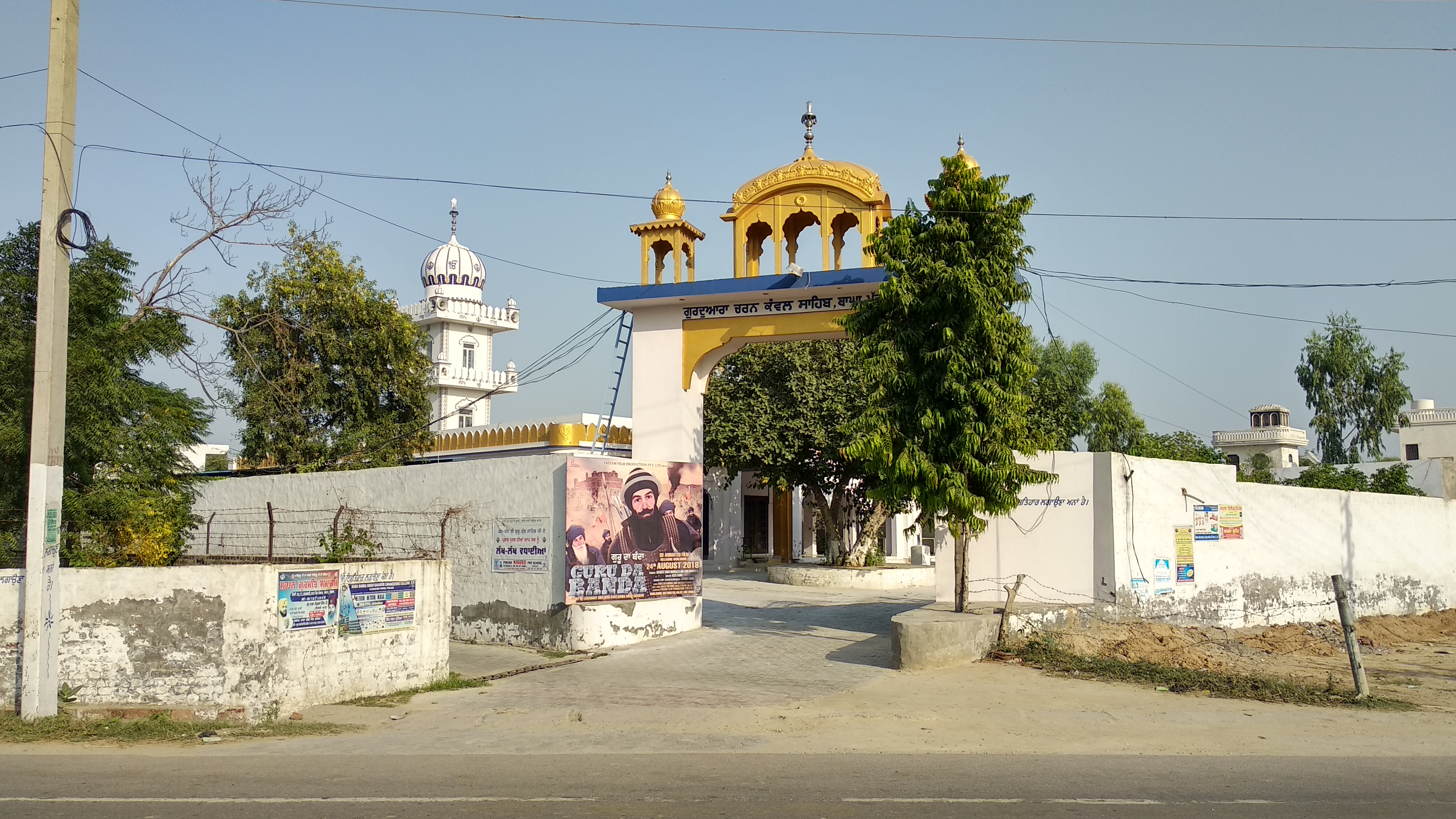
Gurudwara Charan Kanwal Sahib, Bagha Patti at Moga Road, Bagha Purana

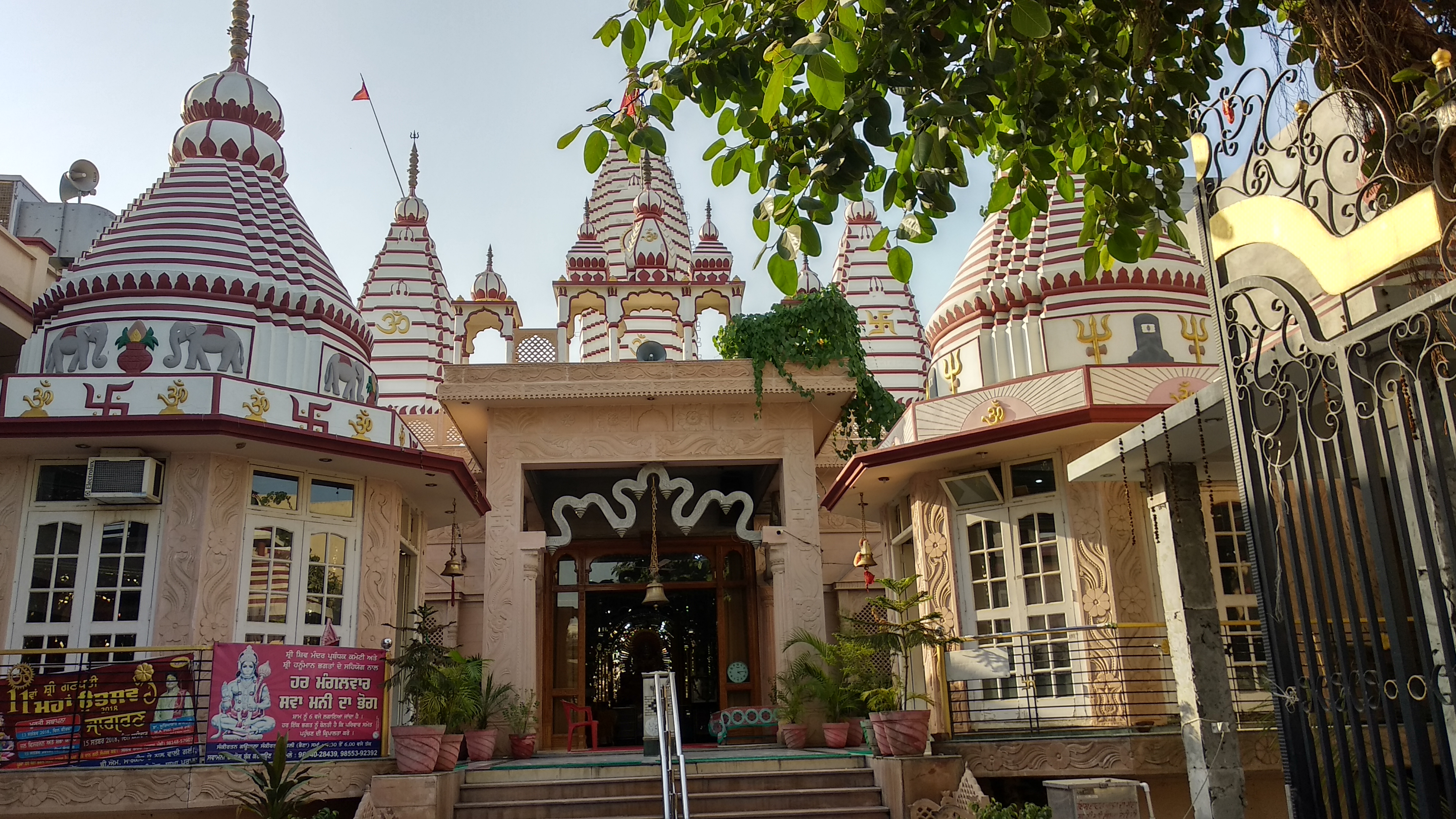
Shiv Mandir at Moga Road, Bagha Purana

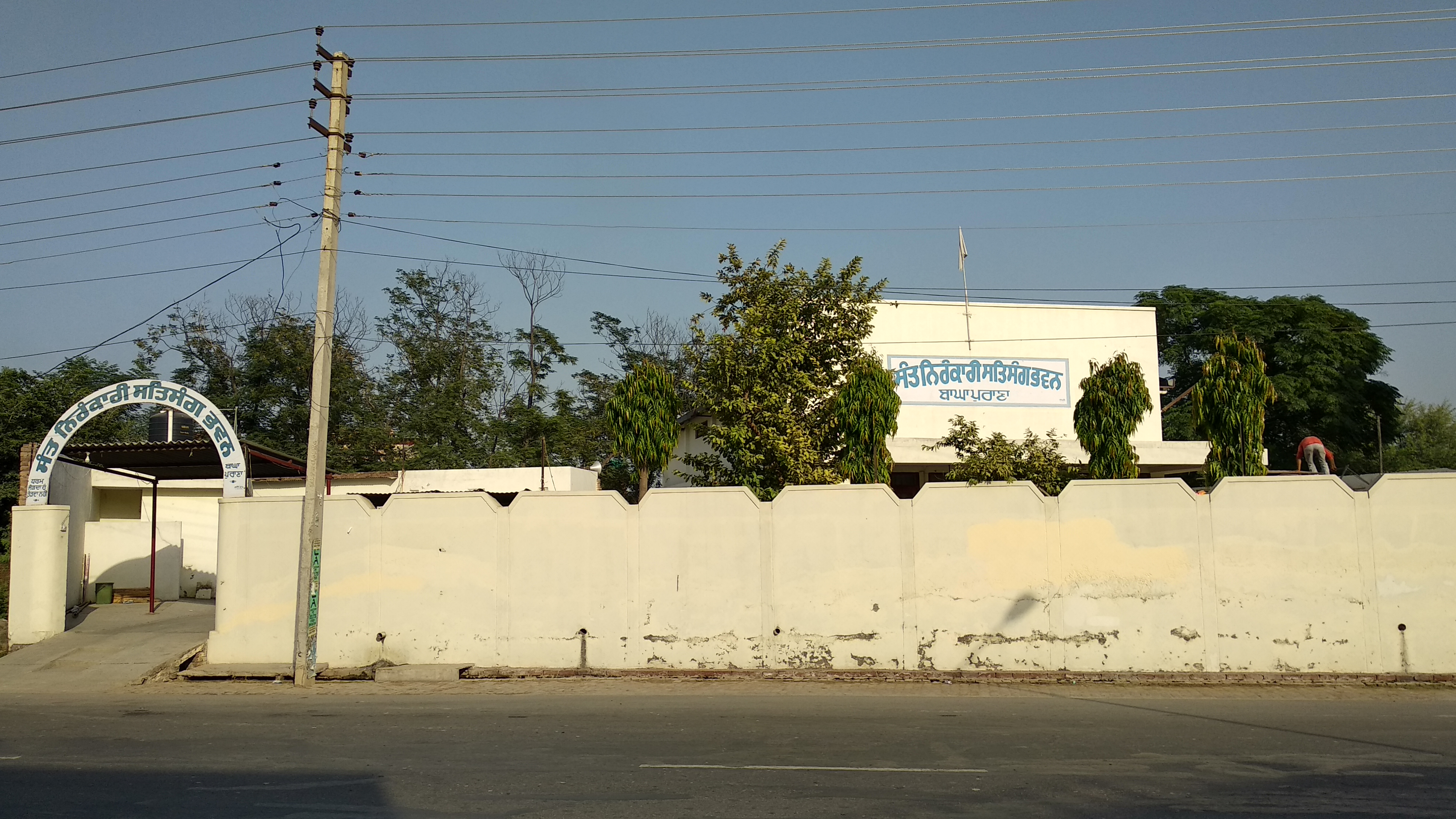
Nirankari Bhawan at Moga Road, Bagha Purana

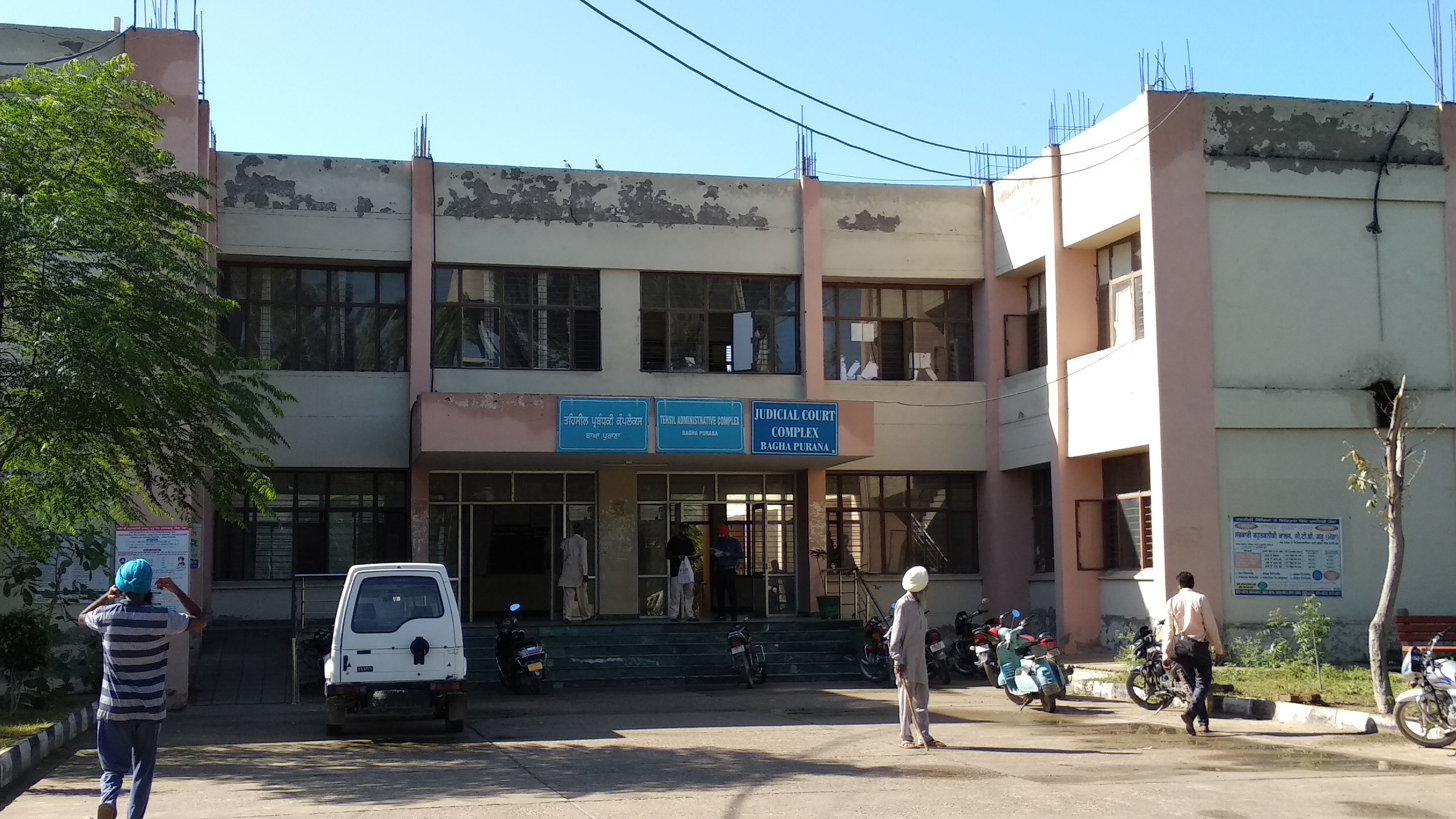
Tehsil Administrative and Judicial Court Complex at Mudki Road, Bagha Purana

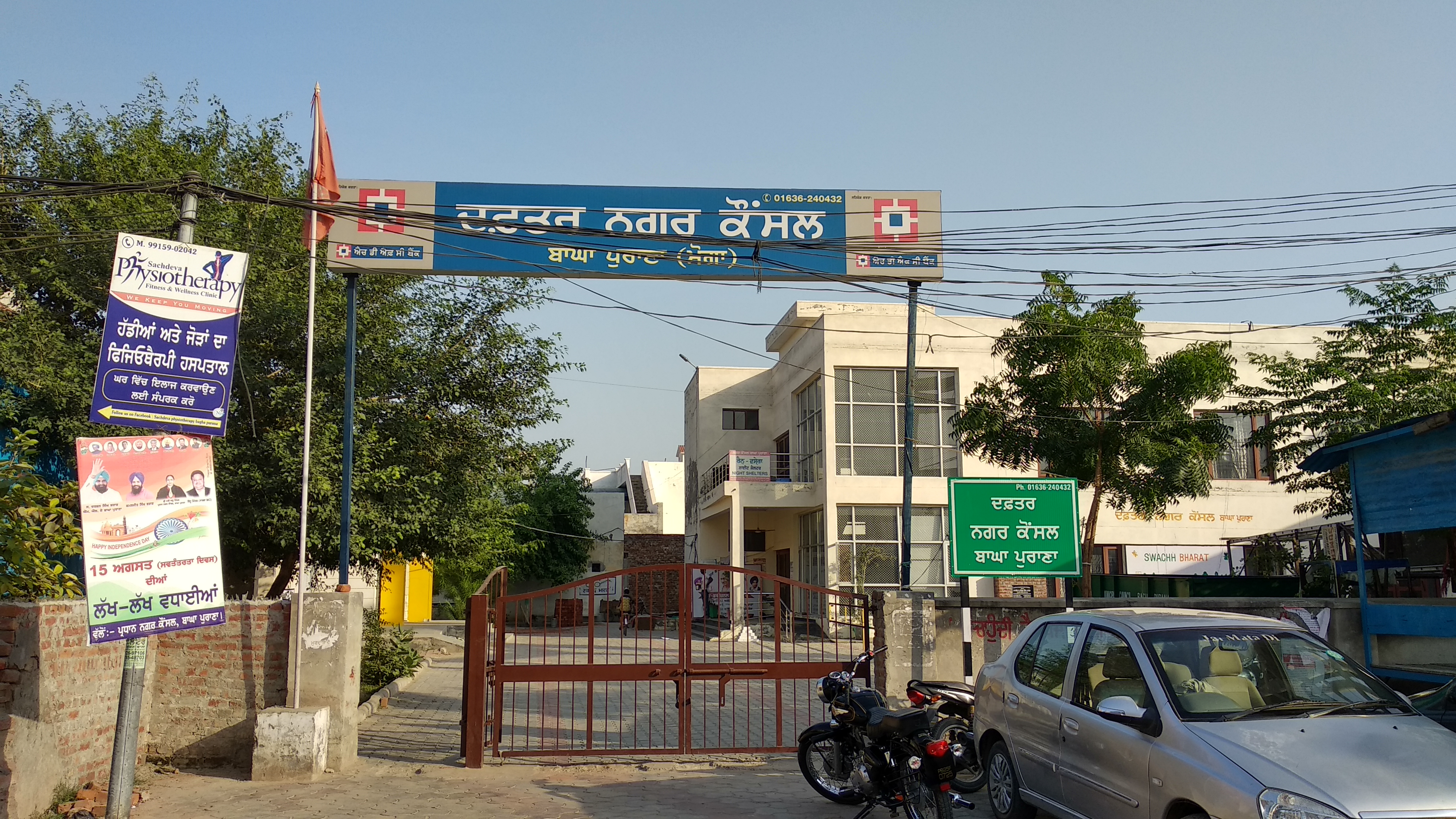
Municipal Council Office, Bagha Purana

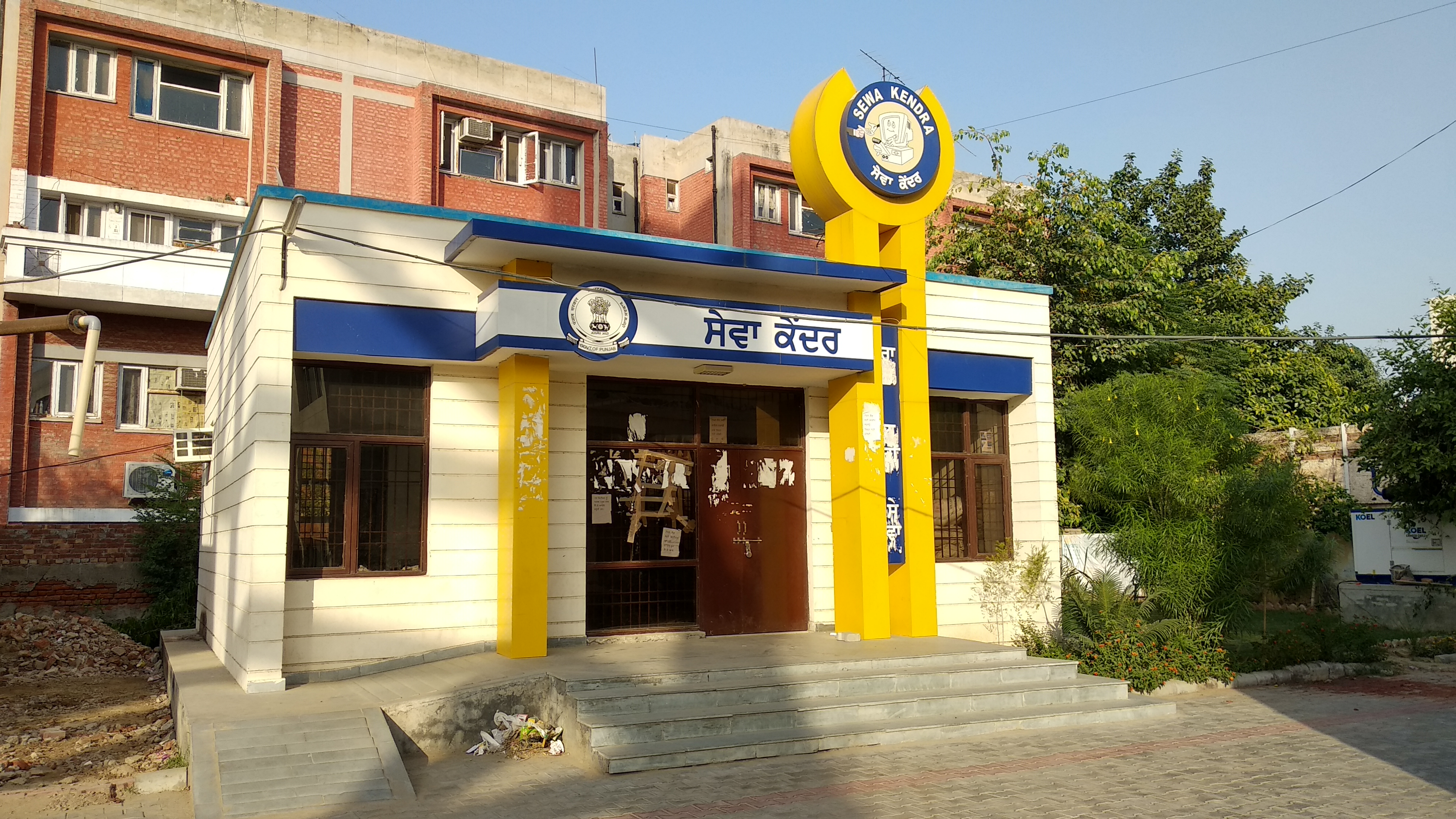
Sewa Kendra Bagha Purana

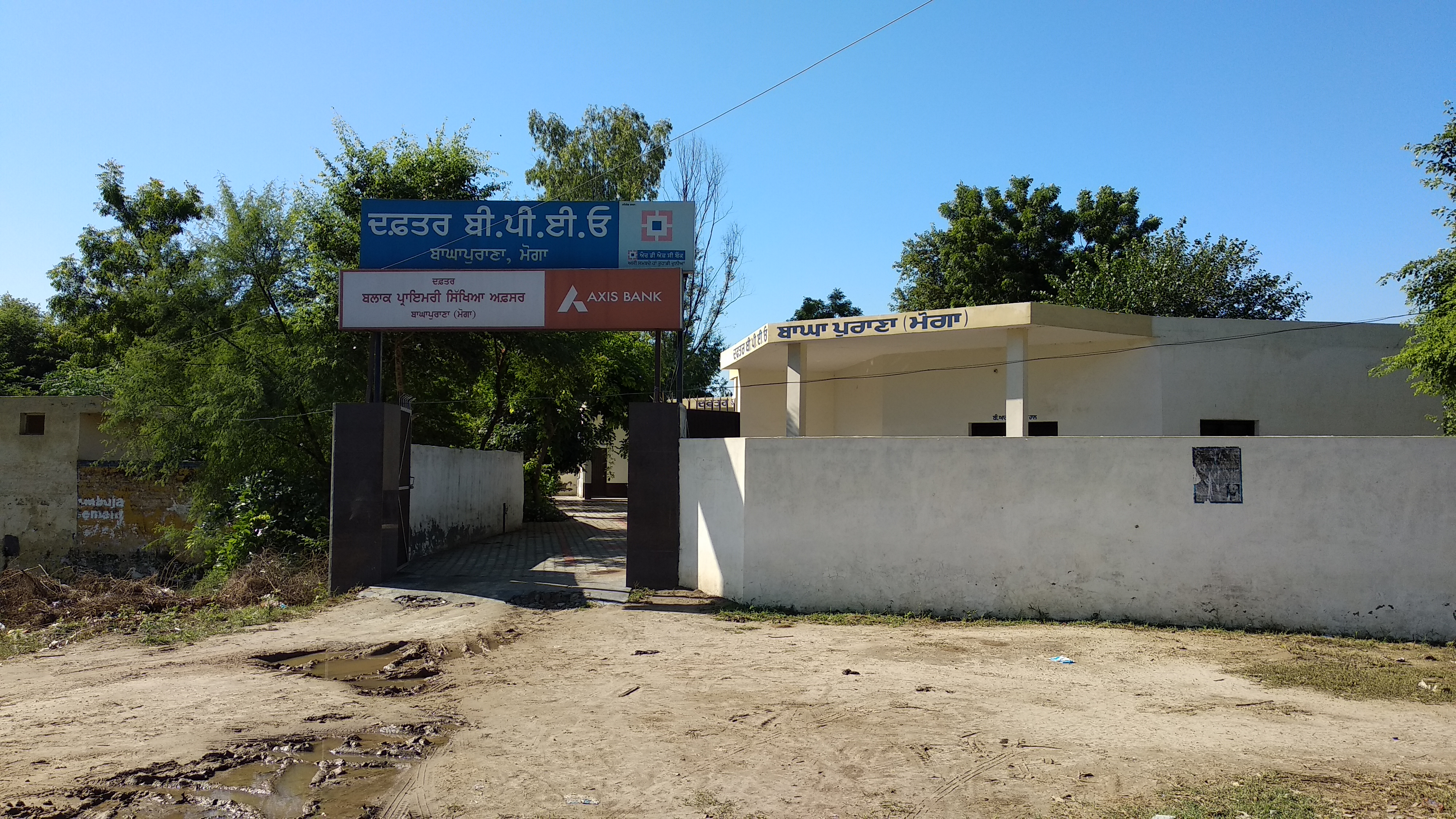
BPEO Office Bagha Purana at Mudki Road, Bagha Purana

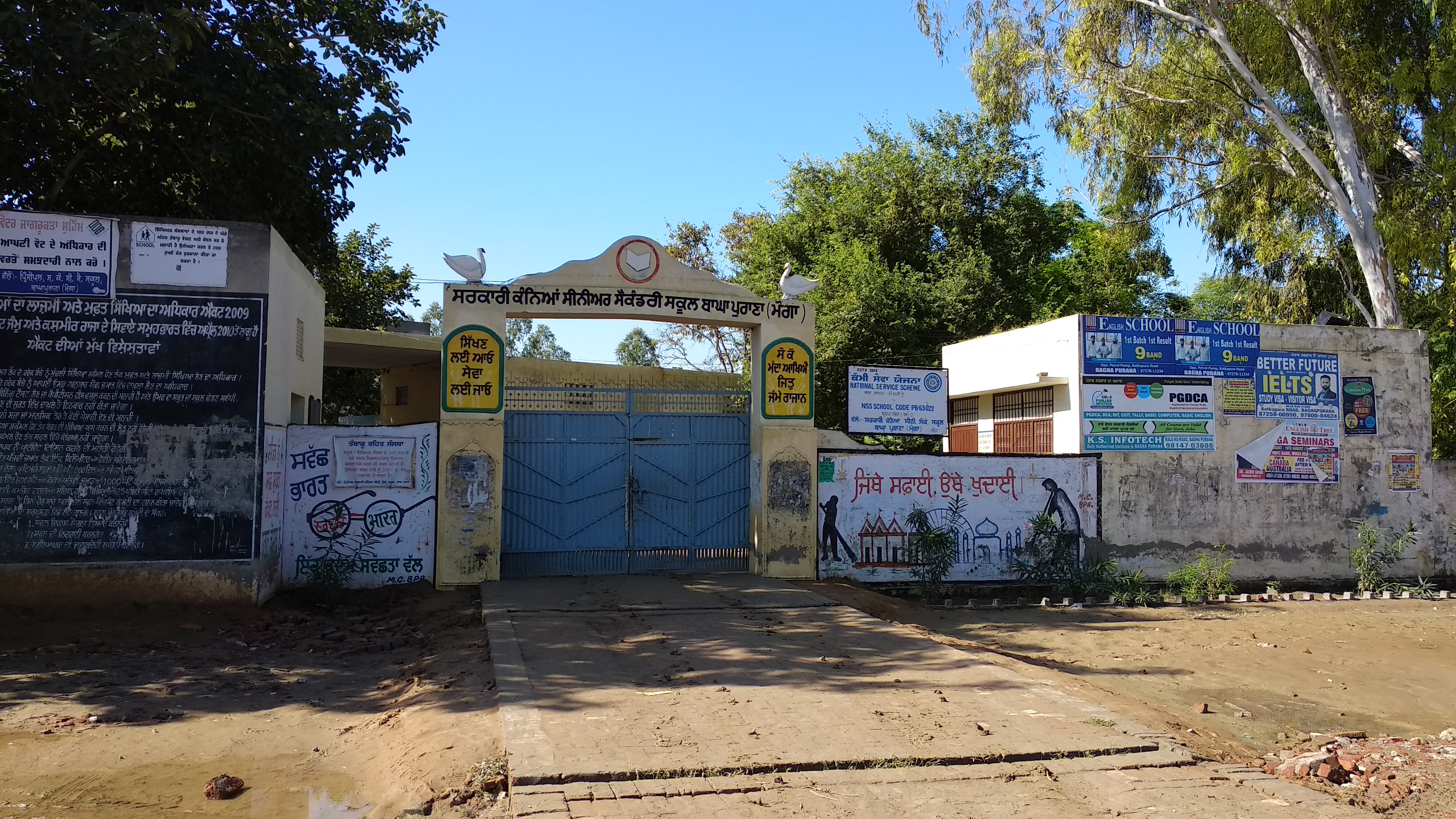
Govt School, Girls Bagha Purana at Mudki Road, Bagha Purana

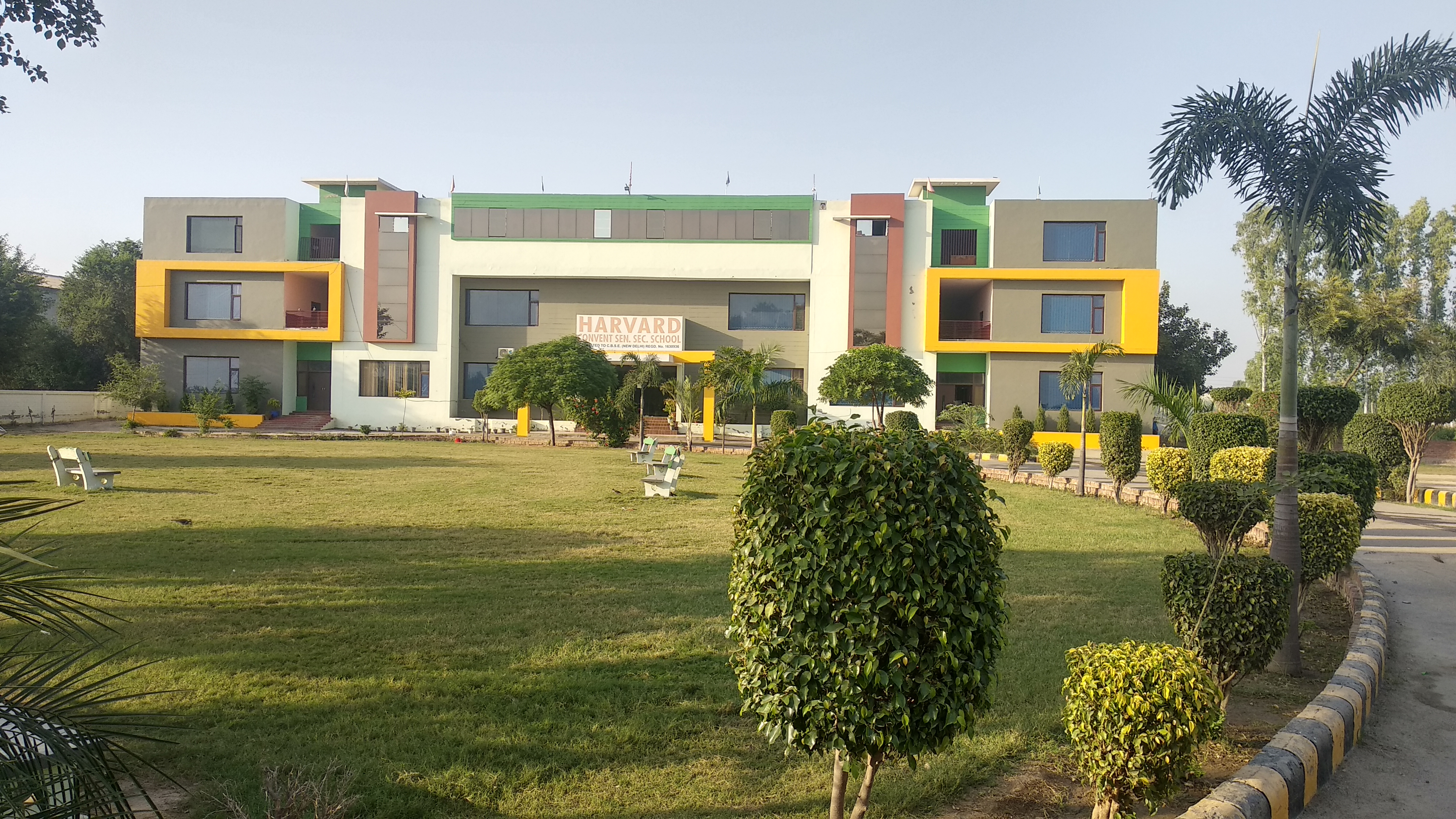
Harvard Convent School at Mudki Road, Bagha Purana

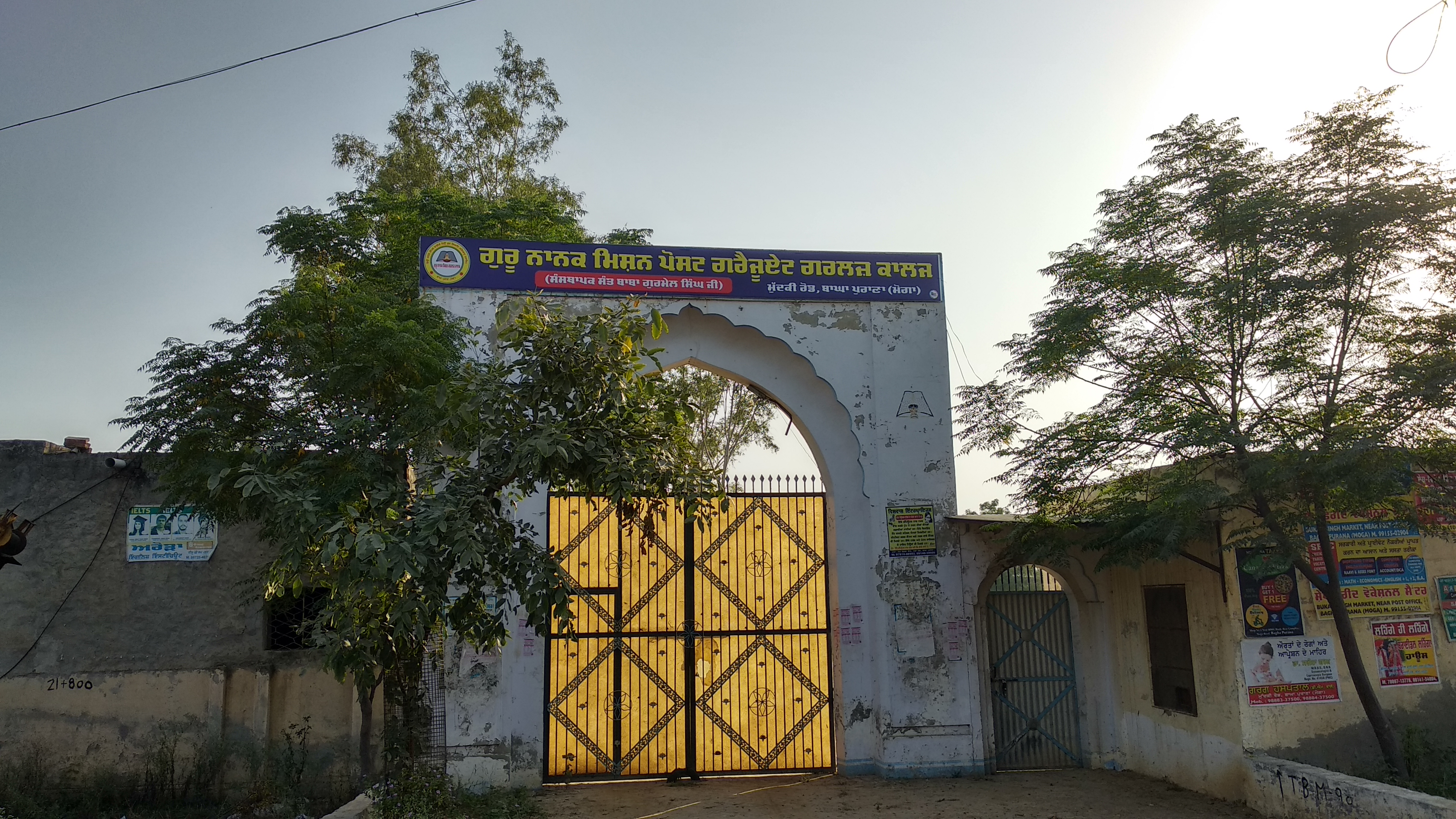
Guru Nanak College at Mudki Road, Bagha Purana

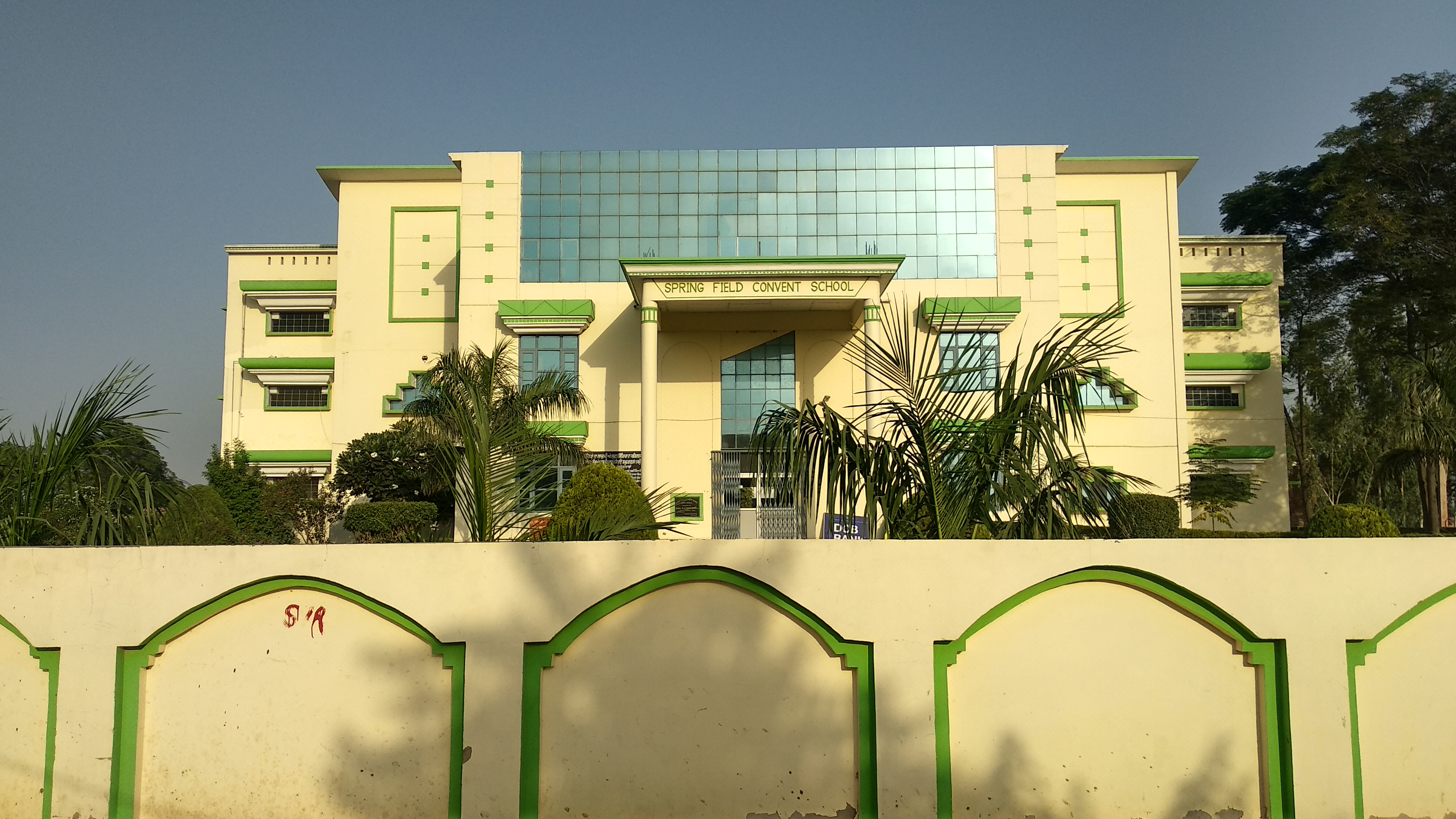
Spring Field Convent School at Mudki Road, Bagha Purana
