= Talwandi Bhai =

- Town
- Nickname: Bhai Ki Talwandi
- Location in Punjab, India
- Coordinates: 30°51′44″N 74°55′43″E
- Country: India
- State: Punjab
- District: Firozpur

Area
  - Total: 3.0 km^{2} (1.2 sq mi)

Population (2011)
  - Total: 17,285
  - Density: 5,800/km^{2} (15,000/sq mi)

Languages
  - Official: Punjabi
- Time zone: UTC+5:30 (IST)
- PIN: 142050
- Area code: 91-1632
- Vehicle registration: Pb 05
- Literacy: 77.70%
- Sex ratio: 878/1000
- Major Highways: NH 5 & NH 54
- Website: lgpunjab.gov.in/eSewa/talwandibhai/about-us/

Talwandi Bhai is a town having a municipal council situated in Ferozepur district in the Indian state of Punjab. It is situated on national highways NH5 and NH54 (old NH15 and NH95). It started its journey as grain market because it was centred between many villages having rail and road transport facilities and now it has expanded as a multi-professional, agricultural and industrial hub. It is also famous for manufacturing of all types of tractor driven agricultural equipment. Pin code of Talwandi Bhai is 142050.

== Demographics ==
In the 2011 census, the population of Talwandi Bhai was 17,285: 9202 male and 8083 female. Female Sex Ratio is of 878 per 1000 males. Literacy rate of Talwandi Bhai town is 77.70 %, which is higher than state average of 75.84 %.

== Education ==
GOVT. Sen. Sec. School boys

- Jogindra Convent School is a CISCE affiliated Senior Secondary School near Talwandi Bhai
- S.B.R D.A.V Senior Secondary Public School, Talwandi Bhai

== Transport ==
Talwandi Bhai is served by Talwandi railway station and National Highways NH5 and NH54.
