= National Highway 107 (India) =

National highway in India

National Highway 107
- Map of National Highway 107 in red

Route information
- Length: 74 km (46 mi)

Major junctions
- From: Rudraprayag
- To: Gaurikund

Location
- Country: India
- States: Uttarakhand

Highway system
- Roads in India; Expressways; National; State; Asian
← NH 7	→ NH 107

National Highway 107 (NH 107) is a national highway in India running from Rudraprayag to Gaurikund in Uttarakhand.

== See also ==
- List of national highways in India
- National Highways Development Project
