= Moodkee =

Mudki Moodkee
- town
- Mudki
- Location in Punjab, India Mudki (India)
- Coordinates: 30°47′N 74°53′E
- Country: India
- State: Punjab
- District: Ferozepur
- Established: 1800

Government
  - Type: Municipal council
  - Body: Nagar Parishad

Population
  - Total: 10,415

Languages
  - Official: Punjabi
- Time zone: UTC+5:30 (IST)
- PIN: 142060
- Vehicle registration: PB 05
- Website: http://lgpunjab.gov.in/eSewa/mudki/city-introduction/?lang=en

Mudki, also spelled as Moodkee, is a town in Punjab state of India. This town lies in Ferozepur district. Mudki has been famous for the Battle of Mudki, which took place in 1845 between the British and Sikh armies. In memory of Sikh soldiers who died in the battle, a famous Gurudwara named Shaheed ganj, or Katalgarh, stands at the site of the battle. More recently, a school named as Shahid Ganj Public School and a women's college have been started, which are providing education in the rural area, in which, being a border district, there are very few schools and colleges.

== History ==
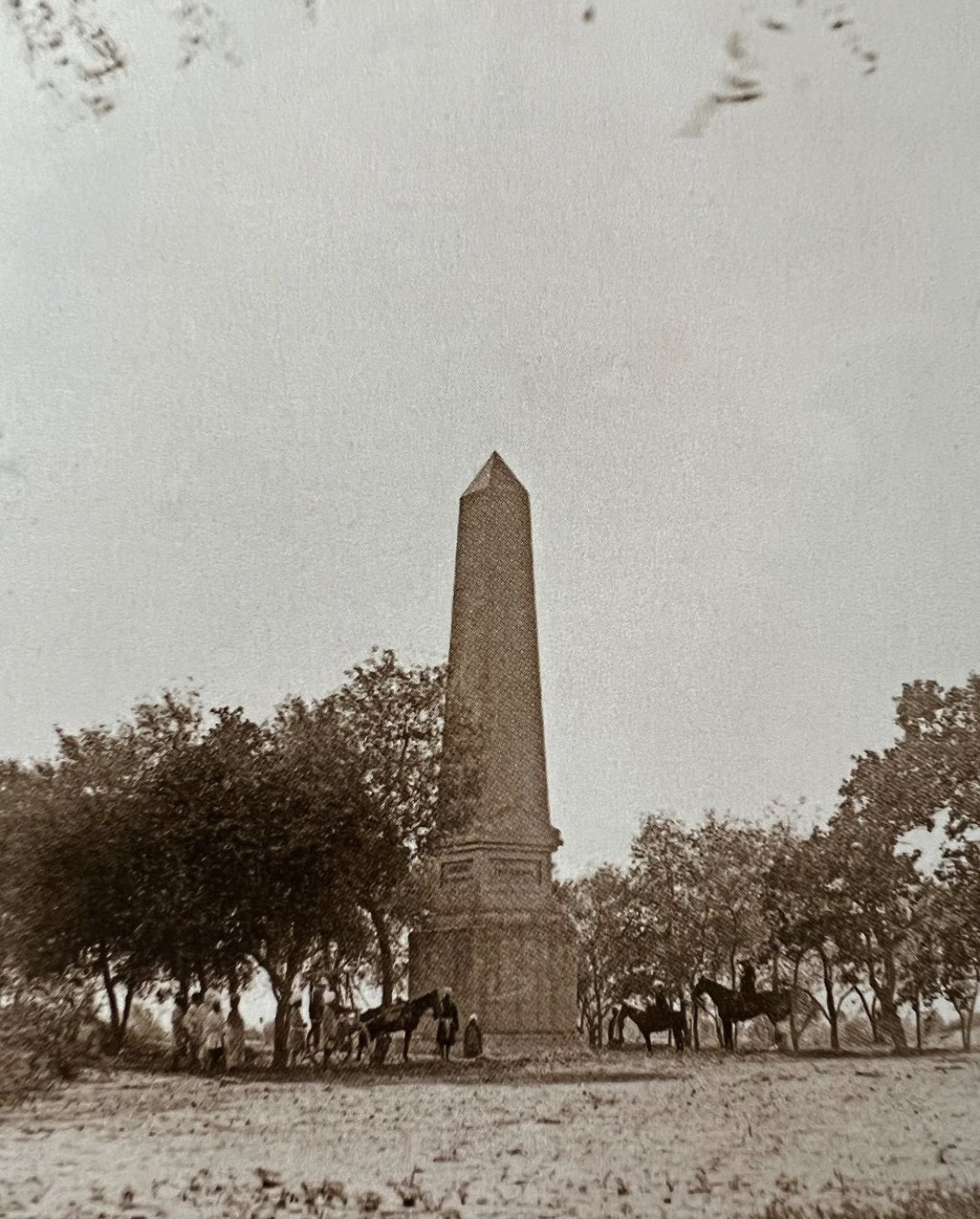
Anglo-Sikh War Memorial Mudki

The Sikh Empire of the Punjab had been held together by Maharajah Ranjit Singh. Ranjit Singh had maintained a policy of friendship with the British East India Company, who held territories adjoining the Punjab, while at the same time building up the Khalsa, to deter aggression. When he died in 1839, the Sikh empire fell into increasing disorder. As several successive rulers and ministers were deposed or murdered, the army expanded and became increasingly restive. To secure their hold on power, some of the leaders in the Punjab goaded their army into a war against the British.

The Battle of Mudki was fought on 18 December 1845, between the forces of the East India Company and part of the Sikh Khalsa Army, the army of the Sikh Empire of the Punjab. The British army won an untidy encounter battle, suffering heavy casualties.
