= List of highways in Haryana =

The state of Haryana in North India has a vast road network with 34 National Highways (NH) with a total length of 2,484 km, 11 Expressways (including 3 National Expressways), State Highways (SH) with a total length of 1,801 km, major district roads (MDR) with a length of 1,395 km and other district roads with a length of 26,022 km (2016).

== List of national highways in Haryana ==
1. National Highway 105 (India)
2. National Highway 11 (India)
3. National Highway 148A (India)
4. National Highway 148B (India)
5. National Highway 148N (India)
6. National Highway 152 (India)
7. National Highway 152A (India)
8. National Highway 152D (India)
9. National Highway 248A (India)
10. National Highway 248BB (India)
11. National Highway 254 (India)
12. National Highway 334B (India)
13. National Highway 334D (India)
14. National Highway 344 (India)
15. National Highway 352 (India)
16. National Highway 352A (India)
17. National Highway 352R (India)
18. National Highway 352W (India)
19. National Highway 44 (India)
20. National Highway 444A (India)
21. National Highway 48 (India)
22. National Highway 5 (India)
23. National Highway 52 (India)
24. National Highway 54 (India)
25. National Highway 7 (India)
26. National Highway 703 (India)
27. National Highway 709 (India)
28. National Highway 709A (India)
29. National Highway 709AD (India)
30. National Highway 9 (India)
31. National Highway 907 (India)
32. National Highway 907G (India)
33. National Highway 919 (India)
34. Kaithal Pundri Karnal Highway

== State highways (SH) ==
The state highways are arterial routes of a state, linking district headquarters and important towns within the state and connecting them with national highways or Highways of the neighboring states.

Number	Length (km)	Length (mi)	Southern or western terminus	Northern or eastern terminus	Formed	Removed	Notes
SH 1	64.1	39.8	Jagadhri-Bilaspur-Sadhaura Naraingarh Raipur Rani Road		—	—	
SH 2	47.91	29.77	Surewala Chowk to Fatehabad		—	—	
SH 4	75.5	46.9	Kala Amb Sadhaura Shahbad Thol		—	—	
SH 5	15.14	9.41	Saha to Ambala		—	—	
SH 6	103.64	64.40	Saharanpur Radaur Pipli Pehowa Chika		—	—	
SH 6A	4.9	3.0	Jagadhri-Paonta		—	—	
SH 7	59.25	36.82	Karnal Ladwa Shahbad		—	—	
SH 8	108	67	Kunjpura Karnal Pundri Kaithal Khanauri		—	—	
SH 9	60.25	37.44	Karnal Kaithal Pehowa Patiala		—	—	
SH 10	135.82	84.39	Gohana Jind Barwala Agroha Adampur Bhadra -2/4 Lane		—	—	
SH 11	183.71	114.15	Meerut Sonepat Gohana Safidon Assandh Kaithal Patiala		—	—	
SH 11A	30	19	Deoban to Naguran		—	—	
SH 12	192.32	119.50	Karnal Assandh Jind Hansi Tosham Sodiwas		—	—	
SH 13	30.19	18.76	Nuh-Palwal		—	—	
SH 14	129.78	80.64	Panipat Safidon Jind		—	—	
SH 15	21	13	Shahjahanpur-Rewari road.		—	—	
SH 15A	43.03	26.74	Jhajjar Farraqnagar Gurgaon		—	—	
SH 16	62.28	38.70	Sanauli Panipat and Rohtak Bhiwani		—	—	
SH 16A	68.91	42.82	Gohana Lakhan Majra Meham Chang		—	—	
SH 17	199.74	124.11	Nizampur Narnaul Mohindergarh Dadri Bhiwani Hansi Barwala Tohana Munak (converted to NH148B)		—	—	
SH 18	41.1	25.5	Rohtak Kharkhoda Delhi Border		—	—	
SH 19	49.5	30.8	Siwani Singhani road		—	—	
SH 20	156.59	97.30	Murthal Sonepat Kharkhoda Sampla Jhajjar Jahajgarh Chhuchakwas Dadri Loharu		—	—	
SH 21	65.51	40.71	Budhlada Ratia Fatehabad Bhattu Bhadra		—	—	
SH 22	77.11	47.91	Bahadurgarh Jhajjar Kosli Kanina khas(Kanina)		—	—	
SH 23	68.48	42.55	Sardulgarh-Sirsa Ellenabad		—	—	
SH 24	92.45	57.45	Rewari Dahina Kanina Mohindergarh Satnali Loharu		—	—	
SH 26	119.88	74.49	Gurgaon Pataudi Rewari Narnaul Singhana (Rewari-Narnaul-Singhana section converted to NH11)		—	—	
SH 31	17	11	Saha to Shahbad		—	—	
SH 32	70.43	43.76	Sirsa-Ottu-Rania-Jiwan Nagar-Dabwali road		—	—	
SH 33	28.64	17.80	Nilokheri Karsa Dhand road		—	—	

== Major District Roads (MDR) ==
MDR No.	Route	Passes through — district(s)	Length (in km)
MDR100	Pundri Habri Munak Panipat		64.4
MDR101	Tohana-Dharsul-Ratia up to State Border		57.98
MDR101A	State Border-Rori Kalanwali Dabwali		52.88
MDR102	Jakhal-Dharsul-Bhuna Pabra Sarsaud		64.57
MDR103	Bhattu-Ludesar-Jamal (up to Border)		39.65
MDR104	Sirsa-Ludessar-Bhadra (up to Border)		32.73
MDR107	Hisar-Balasmand-Burak		36.29
MDR108	Hisar-Tosham-Bhiwani		59.83
MDR109	Jhanwari-Miran-Siwani		30
MDR110	Jhumpa-Behl-Obra-Kairu-Lohani		57.70
MDR111	Narwana-Tohana		28.83
MDR112	Uchana-Latani-Uklana		30.99
MDR113	Dhand-Pundri-Rajaund-Alewa		62
MDR114	Assand-Salwan-Kohana		37.85
MDR115	Karnal-Munak		25.20
MDR116	Thanesar-Jhansa-Thol		28.84
MDR118	Panchkula-Morni		30.90
MDR119	Thanesar-Dhand-Kaithal		45.91
MDR121	Ganaur-Shahpur		25.29
MDR122	Bahadurgarh-Chhara-Dhujana-Beri Kalanaur		58
MDR123	Jhajjar-Badli to Delhi Border		18.25
MDR124	Bond-Kalan-Dadri-Chirya-Bhagot-Kanina-Ateli		87.75
MDR125	Satnali-Badhra-Jui-Kairu-Tosham		55.43
MDR126	Charkhi Dadri-Jhojhu Kalan-Kadma-Satnali		32.17
MDR127	Faizabad-Sihma-Kanina		28.84
MDR128	Nizampur-Nangal-Dargu-Nangal Chaudhary		17.30
MDR129	Narnaul-Nangal Chaudhary-Bhudwala (converted to NH148B)		30 km
MDR130	Chhuchakwas-Jharli-Bahu-Karoli		36.23
MDR131	Hodal-Punhana-Nagina		39.99
MDR132	Hodal-Uttawar-Nuh Taoru Pataudi-Patuda		101.77
MDR133	Ballabgarh-Pali-Dauj-Sohna		29.80
MDR135	Palwal-Hathin-Uttawar-Bhandas		37.09
MDR136	Bahadurgarh Badli Chandu		31.76
MDR137	Mehrauli-Gurgaon road to Faridabad		25.08
MDR138	G.T. Road to Jatheri-Akbarpur RathdhanaNahra Kundal Sohati Bahadurgarh		25.45
MDR139	Rania-Mohmadpuria-Balasar-NaiwalaDutianwali-Bacher road up to border		35

== Other District Roads (ODR) ==
Haryana also has at least 11,216 km other district roads (ODR), also known as the village roads.

== Expressways ==
Following expressways, also called e-ways, pass through Haryana.

Name	Lanes	Status	Total length (km)	Length in Haryana (km)	Part of (NH/SH Names) / Notes
Ambala–Chandigarh Expressway	4	Completed	35		NH-152
Ambala–Narnaul Expressway	6	Completed	230	230	NH-152D
Ambala-Shamli Expressway	6	Under Construction	121.8	75	
Ludhiana–Bathinda–Ajmer Expressway	4	Construction ongoing			Brownfield expansion of NH-54D
Amritsar–Jamnagar Expressway (Bathinda–Kandla Expressway)	4	Completed	900		
Delhi-Chandigarh Expressway (Delhi-Chandigarh Yamunabank Expressway)	6	Planned	270 km		
Delhi–Amritsar–Katra Expressway	6	Completed	600		Palwal WPE - Jewar spur (optional)
Delhi–Faridabad Skyway	6	Completed	4.4		NH-19, Elevated. Future extension to Dhuaj-WPE-Punhana.
Delhi–Gurgaon Expressway	8 to 10	Completed	27.7		NH-48, future extension to WPE
Delhi-Hisar-Fazilka Expressway	6	Planned	170		Greenfield straight-line alignment to Gurugram-Delhi. Fazilka-Abohar-Rania-Chautala-Hisar - Kanwari - Gujrani - Chhuchakwas - Farrukh Nagar - KMP Expressway - IGI Airport (Dwarka Experssway). Additional spur from Palwal KMPE to Jewar Airport, this will connect Hisar Airport to IGI and Jewar.
Delhi-Jaipur Expressway	8	Completed	242		NH-48
Delhi–Jaipur New Expressway (Delhi–Jaipur Super Expressway)	8	Planned	195.1		NH-352B
Delhi–Mumbai Expressway	8 to 12	Completed	1,350	129	50 km length in Faridabad-Nuh section and 79 km length in Sohna-Ferozepur Jhirka section.
Delh–Panipat Expressway	8	Completed	27.6		8 main and 4 (2+2) service lane.
Dwarka Expressway	8	Completed	27.6		
Eastern Peripheral Expressway	6	Completed	135		
Faridabad–Noida–Ghaziabad Expressway	6 to 8	Under construction	56	28.1	
Hisar-Rewari Expressway (via Tosham, Badhra, Mahendragarh, Kanina, and Taoru)	4	Proposed	160	DPR ready in Jan 2024, to be undertaken under Bharatmala phase-A.	
Hisar–Jaipur–Chandigarh Expressway	6 to 8	Proposed	300		
Surnama-Kanwari-Meham Expressway	6 to 8	Proposed	200		Bikaner-Hisar-Meham route; will intersect Bhatinda-Kandla, Bhatinda-Ajmer, Fazilka-Hisar-Delhi, Ambala-Narnaul; will also easily access Delhi-Jammu, WPE.
Panipat Elevated Expressway	6	Operational	10		GT Road (NH44), Elevated
Panipat-Dabwali Expressway (via Uchana, Ratia, Sardulgarh, Kalanwali)	6	Proposed	260	200 km long, 6-lane (expandable to 8 lanes) access-controlled expressway. Interchanges at Dabwali, Sirsa, Fatehabad, Tohana, Jind, and Panipat. Smart highway with IoT-based traffic management will decongest NH-9 and NH-44 while improving freight movement to Delhi NCR. In June 2025, 95% land acquisition completed (delays in some patches near Sirsa), construction Dabwali-Sirsa 50 km is 40% completed (Dec 2026 target completion) and Sirsa-Panipat 150 km section bidding underway (construction to start by Q3 2025 with target completion by late 2027).	
Western Peripheral Expressway	6	Completed	135.6		
Outer Western Peripheral Expressway	6	Proposed	500		Not yet approved. Meerut-Samalkha - Gohana - Meham - Matanhail - Kosli - Bhadas - Hodal - Jewar - Yamuna Expressway.
NCR Counter Magnet Cities Peripheral Expressway	6	Proposed	2,000		Greenfield alignment. Not yet approved. Hisar -Kaithal - Ambala (incl. Patiala) - Dhradun (from Ambala via Yamuna Nagar) - Bareilly - Kanpur - Bhopal - Kota - Jaipur - Hisar.

== See also ==
- List of national highways in India
- Railway in Haryana
- Airports in Haryana
- Administrative divisions of Haryana
