= Panipat–Dabwali Expressway =

Expressway in Haryana, India

- Dabwali–Panipat Expressway

Route information
- Length: 300 km (190 mi) approximate

Location
- Country: India
- State: Haryana

Highway system
- Roads in India; Expressways; National; State; Asian; State Highways in Haryana

Panipat–Dabwali Expressway is an under-construction 300-kilometre-long (190 mi), four-lane access-controlled, greenfield expressway in Haryana state in North India, connecting Mandi Dabwali near the Punjab border in the northwest to the city of Panipat in the east, significantly reducing travel time across Haryana state's east central, north central, and northwestern regions. This expressway will boost the economy, cut down the travel time, reduce logistics cost and improve property prices.

== Details ==
The project, with estimated cost of ₹8,000 crore, is part of India's National Infrastructure Pipeline (NIP) and is being developed by the National Highways Authority of India (NHAI).

== Route ==
This expressway is expected to improve connectivity between Punjab, Rajasthan, Haryana, and Uttar Pradesh states, and runs through Haryana connecting following key districts and towns in eastern, northcentral and northwestern Haryana.

- Panipat district of Haryana
  - Samalkha (south of Panipat) where it will connect with Panipat-Gorakhpur-Siliguri Expressway at NH-44 Delhi-Ambala National Highway.
- Jind district of Haryana
  - Safidon on Jind-Panipat State Highway.
  - Alewa-where it will connect with Trans-Haryana Expressway (NH-152D and Delhi–Amritsar–Katra Expressway (NE5)
  - Kandela on NH-709A Jind-Karnal National Highway.
  - Uchana on NH-352 Jind-Narwana National Highway.
- Hisar district of Haryana
  - Uklana on NH-52 Chandigarh-Hisar-Rajgarh-Churu National Highway.
- Fatehabad district of Haryana
  - Bhuna on and Fatehabad-Uklana State Highway-2.
- Fatehabad city (via passing north near Aherwan village)
  - Ratia
  - Hanspur on Haryana-Punjab border
- Mansa district of Punjab
  - Sardulgarh (south of) on NH-703 Moga-Barnala-Sirsa-Nohar-Churu National Highway.
- Sirsa district of Haryana
  - Rori on Haryana-Punjab border on SH-17
  - Kalanwali on SH-101A
  - Odhan (north of) on NH-9 Pithoragarh-Moradabad-Hapur-Delhi-Hisar-Dabwali-Malout National Highway.
  - Chautala village (southwest of Mandi Dabwali) near the Punjab-Rajasthan-Haryana border.

== Present status ==
- November 2025: After revised DPR was prepared in 2024 at cost of ₹80 lakh, financial approval was awaited from the central government.

== See also ==
- Industrial corridors of India
- List of megaprojects in India
