= Trans-Haryana Expressway =

Indian expressway connecting Ambala and Narnaul in Haryana

Trans-Haryana Expressway
- Ambala–Narnaul Expressway
- Trans-Haryana Expressway in red

Route information
- Maintained by National Highways Authority of India (NHAI)
- Length: 227 km (141 mi)
- Existed: 1 August 2022–present

Major junctions
- North end: NH 152 in Ghangheri village, Kurukshetra district
- List: NH 709A in Bahri; NE 5 in Bania Khera; NH 352A in Chabri; NH 352 in Kilazafargarh; NH 9 in Kharkara; NH 709 in Kalanaur; NH 334B in Charkhi Dadri
- South end: Surana village, Mahendragarh district

Location
- Country: India
- States: Haryana

Highway system
- Roads in India; Expressways; National; State; Asian

The Trans-Haryana Expressway or the Ambala–Narnaul Expressway (NH-152D) is a 227-km long, 6-lane wide greenfield access-controlled expressway, connecting the cities of Ambala and Narnaul in the state of Haryana. The expressway connects Gangheri village (on NH-152) in Kurukshetra district (near Ismailabad) with Surana village on Narnaul Bypass (NH-148B) in Mahendragarh district. It passes via Kaul, Pundri, Pillu khera, Julana, Kalanaur, Charkhi Dadri and Kanina. It will reduce the distance from Chandigarh to Delhi, Narnaul, and Jaipur, thus decongesting NH-44 and NH-48.

The alignment intersects with 15 national highways, including NH-9, and several State Highways, including SH6, SH9, SH8, SH11, SH12, SH14, SH10, SH16A, SH20, SH24 and SH26. The area around the expressway is being developed as an industrial corridor, named as the Ambala–Kotputli Economic Corridor. Construction was started in July 2020, and was completed and opened for traffic on 1 August 2022. The industrial corridor consists of four road projects, which have:

- 39-km section of NH-152 from Ambala to Ismailabad
- 227-km long Ambala-Narnaul Expressway
- 14-km section of Narnaul Bypass
- 30-km section of NH-148B from Narnaul Bypass to Paniyala Mor (NH-48).
- 22.85 km corridor of Jalbehra-Shahbad Expressway

== Details ==
Costing ₹5,108 crore, it will have 70 metre right of way, 122 bridges and underpasses and 1,36,000 trees would be planted on either sides is being developed by the National Highways Authority of India (NHAI) under Bharatmala project. Grenfield alignment will reduce the Ismailabad to Narnaul distance by 35 km from the existing 265 km route to 230 km new route. Construction will create 1,500 full-time jobs for 3 years and 120 ongoing jobs will be created for the Toll Plaza staff. To reduce the environmental impact the fly ash will be used from the Tau Devilal Thermal Power Plant at Panipat, Indira Gandhi Super Thermal Power Project at Jhajjar and Rajiv Gandhi Thermal Power Station at Hisar.

== Route alignment ==
It passes through the areas lying in the following 8 districts of Haryana:

1. Kurukshetra district

- Gangheri, NH152D will interchange with the exiting NH152 (Ambala-Pehowa) at Gangheri which is 8 km south of Ismailabad and 8 km north of Pehowa
- Pehowa, interchange with SH6 (Pehowa to Kurukshetra-Yamunanagar) east of Pehowa

2. Kaithal district

- Kaul, interchange with SH9 (Pehowa to Karnal) at Dhand just north of Kaul
- Pundri, interchange with SH8 (Kaithal to Karnal) 3 km east of Pundri

3. Jind district

- Jind city,
  - northeast: interchange with SH12 (Jind to Assand–Karnal) 25 km northeast of Jind near Badhana-Popran
  - northeast: interchange with Delhi–Amritsar–Katra Expressway west of village Ratoli
  - east: interchange with SH14 (Jind to Panipat) 15 km east of Jind at Jamni near Pilu Khera
  - southeast: interchange with SH11 (Jind to Gohana-Sonipat) 15 km east of Jind
  - Kila zafargarh, interchange with NH352 (Jind-Julana to Lakhan Majra–Rohtak) 4 km south of Julana

4. Rohtak district

- Maham city
  - northeast: interchange with SH16A (Bhiwani-Maham to Lakhan Majra-Gohana–Panipat) 8 km northeast of Meham and 7 km southwest of Lakhan Majra
  - east: interchange with NH9 (Delhi-Hisar-Sirsa) 10 km east of Meham at Kharkara and 15 km west of Rohtak
- Kalanaur, interchange with NH709 (Bhiwani to Rohtak)

5. Bhiwani district

- Baund Kalan, 20 km east of Bhiwani
- Sanwar, 20 km southeast of Bhiwani

6. Charkhi Dadri district

- Charkhi Dadri city
  - east: interchange with NH334B (Loharu-Charkhi Dadri to Jhajjar) 5 km east of Charkhi Dadri

7. Mahendragarh district

- Sehlang
  - interchange with Major District Road (MDR) near Baghot village.
  - west: interchange with SH24 (Mahendragarh-Kanina-Rewari) at Buchawas 10 km east of Mahendragarh and 9 km west of Kanina
  - Optional extension spur from NH152D at Mahendragarh to Bhiwadi Airport at Kotkasim via Delhi–Alwar RRTS at Pali and Bawal (NH48 Delhi–Jaipur Expressway), and beyond to Delhi–Mumbai Expressway at Ferozepur Jhirka and Western Peripheral Expressway at Palwal, then to Noida International Airport and Yamuna Expressway at Jewar, and finally to Ganga Expressway via Khurja–Bareilly(NCR Counter Magnet City)–Tanakpur(starting point of Indian-route of Kailash–Manasarovar Yatra).
  - Narnaul, interchange with NH148B (Narnaul to Kotputli) and terminate at Narnaul bypass. The NH148B (former SH129 and SH17) connects Kotputli (45 km south of Narnaul) to Bathinda via Narnaul–Bhiwani–Hansi–Barwala–Tohana-Jakhal. At Kotputli, the NH148B meets the Delhi–Jaipur Expressway (NH48). Together NH148B and NH48 will connect the Hisar Airport to the proposed cargo aerocity of Bhiwadi Airport at Kotkasim.

== Inter-connectivity ==
=== Narnaul–Alwar Expressway ===
Paniyala–Barodameo Expressway, an 86.5 km long 6-lane, access-controlled greenfield expressway from Paniyala (south of Narnaul) to Mator, Alwar, and Barodameo, will connect the southern end of the Trans-Haryana Expressway to the Delhi–Mumbai Expressway at Barodameo. In October 2022, 29 bids were received for the construction of the expressway, tender will be awarded by 31 December 2022, after which construction will take 2 years, completing by end of 2024). There are plans to extend the expressway from Barodameo through the following:

- To Kalapani & Mount Kailash:
  Bardameo to Vrindavan (via Deeg–Govardhan), Yamuna Expressway and Bareilly–Tanakpur–Gunji–Kalapani territory.
- To Nepal:
  Nagar (east of Bardameo) to Bharatpur–Achhnera–Agra, Yamuna Expressway and Farrukhabad–Sitapur–Nepalgunj.
- To Jhansi and Visakhapatnam port:
  Bardameo–Jhansi Expressway from Bardameo–Kherli–Suroth–Khurdiya Nayagaon–Golari/Saipur to Kailaras–Bhitarwar–Bhagour–Sijwaha–Jhansi.

=== Hisar-Rewari Expressway ===
Hisar-Rewari Expressway will intersect Trans-Haryana Expressway north of Mahendragarh.

=== Regional Circular Expressway-2 ===
Regional Circular Expressway-3 (CRE3) will intersect with Trans-Haryana Expressway in two places, between Mahendragarh-Kanina and between Jind–Uchana.

== History ==
=== Construction ===
The NHAI has divided the construction work of 227 km-long Ambala–Narnaul Expressway into 8 packages. Package-1 is a joint venture (JV) of JiangXi Construction Engineering, Ceigall India and Shiv Build India; Package-4 is a JV of JiangXi Construction Engineering and Shiv Build India and Package-7 is a JV of Gawar Construction and Shivalaya Construction Company. The list of contractors is as follows:

| Sr. No | Package | Length in km | Contractor |
|---|---|---|---|
| 1. | Ismailabad (Kurukshetra)–Dhand (Kaithal) | 23 | JiangXi – Ceigall – Shiv Build JV |
| 2. | Dhand (Kaithal)–Rajound (Kaithal) | 33 | Gawar Construction |
| 3. | Rajound (Kaithal)–Kheri (Jind) | 24 | Galfar Engineering and Contracting |
| 4. | Kheri (Jind)–Julana (Jind) | 28 | JiangXi – Shiv Build JV |
| 5. | Julana (Jind)–Kharkara (Rohtak) | 23 | Gawar Construction |
| 6. | Kharkara (Rohtak)–Charkhi Dadri | 34 | Gawar Construction |
| 7. | Charkhi Dadri–Kanina (Mahendragarh) | 35 | Gawar – Shivalaya JV |
| 8. | Kanina (Mahendragarh)–Narnaul | 27 | Gawar Construction |

=== Construction progress ===
- Dec 2018: The required 1,826 hectares of land has been acquired at the cost of ₹529.29 crores.
- Jul 2020: Union Minister Nitin Gadkari laid the foundation stone for the expressway on 14 July 2020 via video conferencing.
- Sep 2020: The expressway will be connected with the under-construction Delhi–Mumbai Expressway.
- Mar 2021: An under-construction flyover of Package-2 collapsed at Dulyani near Pundri, Kaithal.
- Mar 2022: About 95% construction work on the expressway is completed.
- Aug 2022: The expressway underwent a trial run for two days, and was opened for traffic on 1 August.

== See also ==
- List of highways in Haryana
- Industrial corridors of India
- Delhi–Jaipur Expressway
- Delhi–Mumbai Expressway
- Delhi–Amritsar–Katra Expressway
- Haryana Roadways
- Haryana Tourism Corporation
- Railway in Haryana
