= National Highway 71 (India, old numbering) =

Old numbering of road in India

National Highway 71

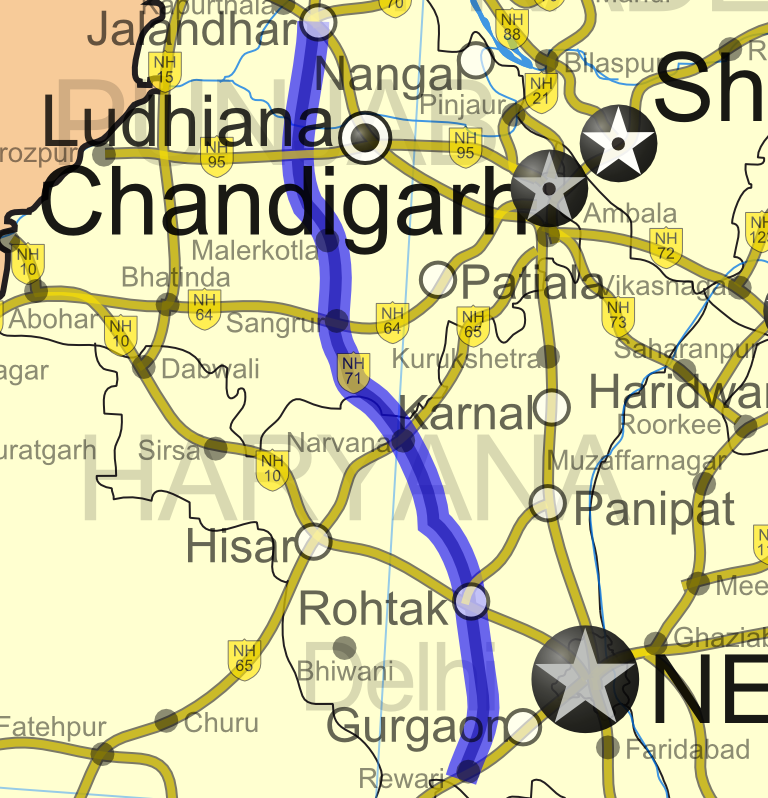
- Road map of India with National Highway 71 highlighted in blue

Route information
- Length: 307 km (191 mi)

Major junctions
- From: Jalandar, Punjab
- To: Rewari, Haryana

Location
- Country: India
- States: Punjab: 130 km (81 mi); Haryana: 177 km (110 mi)
- Primary destinations: Nakodar - Sangrur - Rohtak - Rewari

Highway system
- Roads in India; Expressways; National; State; Asian
← NH 70	→ NH 71A

National Highway 71 (NH 71) was a National Highway in Northern India. NH 71 connected Jalandhar in Punjab to Rewari in Haryana, running a distance of 307 km (191 mi). It ran for a distance of 130 km (81 mi) in Punjab and 177 km (110 mi) in Haryana. National Highway 71 started at the junction of old NH 1 at Jalandhar and traverses down to Rewari to meet old NH 8.

== New numbering ==
Due to Rationalization of Numbering Systems of National Highways by Ministry of Road Transport and Highways, old NH 71 has been renumbered as follows.

- Jalandhar - Moga - Barnala section is part of new National Highway 703
- Barnala - Sangrur section is part of new National Highway 7
- Sangrur - Narwana section is part of new National Highway 52
- Narwana - Rohtak - Rewari section is part of new National Highway 352

== Route ==
The route of National Highway 71 passed through the following towns.

=== Punjab ===
Jalandhar, Nakodar, Moga, Barnala, Sangrur, Patran, Khanauri

=== Haryana ===
Narwana Uchana, Jind, Dighal, julanaRohtak, Dighal, Jhajjar, Rewari

== Rewari bypass ==
The current alignment of NH 71 passes through Rewari city. The existing Rewari-Bawal road has only two lanes and passes through congested areas within the city. Therefore, vehicles take four-lane Rewari bypass before entering Rewari city and then take Bawal road. However even the Rewari bypass is within municipal limits.

=== New Rewari bypass (open to traffic) ===
Now an even better alignment of NH 71 completely bypassing Rewari is being constructed. The construction of an entirely new stretch of four-lane road started in May 2011. It takes off from the existing NH 71 at Bikaner-Lisana village a few kilometres before Rewari while coming from Jhajjar, crosses NH 71B (Rewari-Delhi road) over a bridge (that is now under construction) between the JLN canal and the police lines without touching NH 71B and join NH 8 (Delhi–Jaipur–Udaipur-Ahmedabad-Mumbai highway) at village Sangwadi at 81 km stone on NH 8 instead of Bawal. The new alignment of NH 71 from Rohtak would, thus, be Jhajjar–Rewari–Sangwadi instead of Jhajjar–Rewari–Bawal. The new stretch is scheduled to open for traffic from November 2013. The new alignment of NH71 does not enter Rewari town. It will have a flyover on Rewari-Delhi road between the JLN canal and the police lines.

== Upgrade ==
The construction of four-lane 82.5 km long stretch from Rohtak to Rewari is being done under Design, Build, Finance, Operate, Transfer (DBFOT) basis by a concessionaire who will charge toll tax.

== See also ==
- List of national highways in India
- National Highways Development Project
