= Punjab State Highway 12A =

Road in Punjab, India

State Highway 12A

Route information
- Maintained by Public Works Department, Punjab, State Government of Punjab, India
- Length: 142 km (88 mi)

Major junctions
- From: Mohali, Punjab
- To: Bhikhi, Punjab

Location
- Country: India
- Districts: SAS Nagar, Fatehgarh Sahib, Patiala, Sangrur and Mansa
- Primary destinations: Mohali, Landran, Fatehgarh Sahib, Sirhind, Nabha, Bhawanigarh and Sunam

Highway system
- Roads in India; Expressways; National; State; Asian; State Highways in

Punjab State Highway 12A, commonly referred to as SH 12A, is a state highway in the state of Punjab in India. The route of this state highway is from Mohali to Bhikhi in the state of Punjab. The total length of the highway is 142 kilometres.

== Route description ==
The route of the highway is Mohali-Landran-Chunni Kalan-Fatehgarh Sahib-Sirhind-Mandi Gobindgarh-Bhadson-Nabha-Bhawanigarh-Sunam-Bhikhi

== Major junctions ==
- National Highway 205A in Landran
- Major District Road 53 (Punjab MDR 31) in Fatehgarh Sahib
- National Highway 44 in Sirhind and Mandi Gobindgarh
- Major District Road 32 (Punjab MDR 32) in Nabha
- National Highway 7 in Bhawanigarh
- National Highway 52 in Mahlan
- National Highway 148BB in Sunam
- National Highway 148B in Bhikhi

== See also ==
- List of state highways in Punjab, India
