= National Highway 352A (India) =

National Highway in India

National Highway 352A
- Map of the National Highway in red

Route information
- Length: 86 km (53 mi)

Major junctions
- West end: NH 709A in Jind
- NH 152D in Chabri NE 5 in Issapur Kheri; NH 709 in Gohana NH 344P in Barvasini
- East end: SH 11 / SH 20 in Sonipat

Location
- Country: India
- States: Haryana
- Primary destinations: Jind, Gohana, Sonipat

Highway system
- Roads in India; Expressways; National; State; Asian
← NH 352	→ NH 352R

National Highway 352A(NH 352A), commonly referred to as Jind-Gohana Expressway is an expressway in India. NH-352A is a greenfield project of 40.66 km of four-lane controlled-access expressway along with 2 lane service road from Jind to Gohana and 38.23 km of 4 lane Sonipat-Gohana highway along with 2 lane service road. NH-352A traverses the state of Haryana in India.

== See also ==
- List of national highways in India
- List of national highways in India by state
