= Hisar–Rewari Expressway =

New expressway in Haryana, India

Route information
- Maintained by NHAI

Major junctions
- North end: Hisar, Haryana (junction with NH-9)
- NH 9 near Hisar; Trans-Haryana Expressway near Mahendragarh; NH 48 near Rewari
- South end: Rewari, Haryana (junction with NH-11 and NH-48)

Location
- Country: India
- States: Haryana
- Districts: Hisar, Bhiwani, Mahendragarh, Nuh, Rewari
- Major cities: Hisar, Tosham, Badhra, Mahendragarh, Kanina, Taoru, Rewari
- Primary destinations: Tosham, Badhra, Mahendragarh, Kanina

Highway system
- Roads in India; Expressways; National; State; Asian

Hisar–Rewari Expressway is an under-construction 160-kilometre-long (99 mi), four-lane, access-controlled, greenfield expressway in Haryana state in North India, connecting Hisar, a major counter magnets city in western Haryana, with Rewari, a key junction in southern Haryana in the National Capital Region (NCR) Delhi region. The expressway is designed to be a direct high-speed corridor, reducing the current travel time between the two cities and enhancing connectivity in the state's western-southcentral-south region. The expressway is expected to reduce travel time between Hisar and Rewari from the current 4–5 hours to approximately 2 hours.

== History ==
The Hisar–Rewari Expressway, to be constructed by NHAI, was first proposed as part of the Bharatmala programme in 2017, aimed at improving connectivity in border and rural areas of Haryana. In May 2021, the Haryana government granted in-principle approval for the Hisar-Tosham-Rewari road project to be developed under the hybrid annuity mode (HAM). In November 2024, the central government approved the project as one of three new four-lane highways in Haryana, alongside the Panipat–Dabwali and Ambala–Delhi highways.

== Project ==
=== Specifications ===
The project, estimated to cost approximately ₹3,000 crore and funded through central and state contributions under Bharatmala, will have 24 bypasses, underpasses and flyovers.

=== Benefits ===
The expressway, is a crucial component of the central government's Bharatmala Pariyojana, an umbrella program for national highway development in India, focusing on economic corridors, inter-corridor and feeder routes.

The expressway is anticipated to bring several benefits to the region:

- Economic development: The corridor is anticipated to boost industrial and logistics activities, promoting the development of new industrial clusters and Multimodal Logistics Parks (MLPs) in the region. Improved connectivity will boost trade, agriculture, and industrial activities in Bhiwani and Mahendragarh districts, which are key mining and farming areas. The project's primary goal is to provide seamless connectivity between the agricultural and industrial hubs of Hisar and the commercial and logistics centres of Rewari, which is strategically located near the Delhi-Jaipur National Highway (NH-48) and the Western Dedicated Freight Corridor (WDFC).
- Reduced travel time and logistics costs: It will shorten the distance between Hisar and Rewari, easing traffic on existing state highways and reducing fuel consumption. It will decongest by divertinf heavy freight traffic away from the congested state highways and city centers of towns like Bhiwani and Charkhi Dadri.
- Tourism and employment: Enhanced links to historical sites like Tosham Hill and Rewari Heritage Steam Loco Shed will promote tourism, generating jobs.
- Land value appreciation: Properties along the route are expected to see increased values due to better access to urban centres like Delhi and Gurgaon.

== Route ==
- Hisar district
  - Hisar city (northern terminus), includes construction of 4-lane greenfield southern bypass for the Hisar city.
  - Kanwari
- Bhiwani district
  - Tosham
  - Kairu
  - Jui Khurd NH-709 Panipat-Rohtak-Bhiwani-Pilani route.
- Charkhi Dadri district
  - Badhra NH-334B Jhajjar-Charkhi Dadri-Loharu route.
- Mahendragarh district
  - Satnali (east of)
  - Mahendragarh city (north of)
  - Kanina Khas
- Rewari district
  - Rewari (southern terminus)
- Nuh district
  - Taoru, at Western Peripheral Expressway (WPE)

== Present status ==
- November 2025: NHAI is preparing to issue tenders following the completion of the DPR in 2024. Construction is expected to commence in 2026, with an estimated completion timeline of 3–4 years. The Rewari Bypass, a 14.4 km four-lane extension of NH-11, was inaugurated in April 2025, enhancing connectivity to the proposed expressway's southern end.

== See also ==
- Industrial corridors of India
- List of megaprojects in India
