= Khandrawali =

- Village
- Location in Uttar Pradesh, India Khandrawali (India)
- Coordinates: 29°23′19.68″N 77°16′45.48″E
- Country: India
- State: Uttar Pradesh
- District: Shamli

Government
  - Body: Gram Panchayat
- Elevation: 242 m (794 ft)

Population (2011)
  - Total: 8,871

Languages
  - Official: Hindi
- Time zone: UTC+5:30 (IST)
- PIN: 247775
- Telephone code: 0-1392
- Vehicle registration: UP 19
- Website: up.gov.in

Khandrawali is a large village located in Kairana tehsil of Shamli district in the Indian state of Uttar Pradesh.

== Geography ==
Nearby settlement include Shamli (7 km), Kairana (7 km), Kandhla (7km), Panipat (30 km), Karnal (45 km), Meerut (60 km), Delhi Border (75 km), Muzaffarnagar (45 km), Saharanpur (75 km) and Baraut (35 km).

Most of the population are from dominant Chauhan Gurjar khap consisting of 84 villages popularly known as "Chourasi ke Chauhan".

It is situated between two canals. East Yamuna Canal lies to the east and Chhoti Nahar canal lies to the west. Nearby villages include Keri salha, Alipur, Jahanpur, Aldi, Gujjarpur, Fatehpur, Malakpur, Erti, Kandela, Lilon, Braham Kheda, Loharipur, Beenra, Meemla Garhi, Rasoolpur, Gujran Balwa, Jasala, Panjokhra, Kiwana, Matlnawli,

== Demographics ==
As of census 2011, Khandrawali had population of 8,871 of which 4,764 are males while 4,107 are females. Children aged 0-6 number 1540, 17.36% of the total. The average sex ratio is 862, lower than the state average of 912. The child sex ratio is 925, higher than Uttar Pradesh average of 902. In 2011, the literacy rate was 69.96% compared to 67.68% for Uttar Pradesh. Male literacy stands at 78.94% while female literacy rate was 52.87%.

== Economy ==
The main occupation is agriculture led by sugarcane.

There are six mosques and four temples in the village. The village has a police chowki of Kandhla police station to secure of security of village people and daily passengers. Police chowki Khandrawali is situated nearby khandrawali Bus stand and Khandrawali railway station.

== Transport ==
A railway station sits on the Delhi-Shamli-Saharanpur line.

The Delhi-Saharanpur National Highway 709B runs nearby.
