= National Highway 152A (India) =

National Highway in India

National Highway 152A
- Map of National Highway 152A in red

Route information
- Auxiliary route of NH 52
- Length: 32 km (20 mi)

Major junctions
- West end: Khanauri
- East end: Kaithal

Location
- Country: India
- States: Punjab, Haryana

Highway system
- Roads in India; Expressways; National; State; Asian
← NH 52	→ NH 152

National Highway 152A, commonly referred to as NH 152A is a national highway in India. It is a spur road of National Highway 52. NH-152A traverses the states of Punjab and Haryana in India.

== Route ==
NH 152A connects Khanauri, Shergarh, Arno in Punjab, Sangatpura, Nand Sighwala, Sanghan, Mahal Kheri, Padla, Garhi Padla and Kaithal in Haryana.

== Junctions ==
NH 52 Terminal near Khanauri.
NH 152 Terminal near Kaithal.

== See also ==
- List of national highways in India
- List of national highways in India by state
