= Kharkara =

Kharkara may refer to:

- Kharkara, Haryana, a village in Rohtak district, Haryana, India
- Kharkara, Rajasthan, a village in Alwar district, Rajasthan, India
- Esmailabad, Avaj, a village in Iran also known as Kharkara
