= Delhi–Jaipur Expressway =

National Highways in India

Delhi-Jaipur Highway

Route information
- Length: 242 km (150 mi)

Major junctions
- From: Gurugram
- To: Jaipur

Location
- Country: India
- States: Haryana, Rajasthan

Highway system
- Roads in India; Expressways; National; State; Asian

Delhi–Jaipur Highway or NH48 is a 242-kilometre-long (150 mi), eight-lane, Highway, connecting Delhi with Jaipur in India. It starts from Kherki Toll Plaza in Gurugram and terminate near Daulatpura Toll Plaza at Jaipur.

Several Industrial Model Township(IMT) were developed along the highway in 1990's, four in Haryana at Manesar, Pataudi, Bawal and Dharuhera Industrial estate, and five in Rajasthan at Bhiwadi, Behror, Kotputli, Shahapura and Chomu.

== History ==
The Delhi-Jaipur Highway was widened in 2007 as a National Highway passing through 423 villages of 11 tehsils in 7 districts of Haryana and Rajasthan. The total land required for the project was 1,755.9 hectares (4,339 acres). The cost includes ₹6,350 crores for civil works, ₹5,000 crores for resettlement and rehabilitation of affected individuals, and ₹50.60 crores for environment budget.

== Alignment ==
- In Haryana
  - Kherki Toll Plaza in Gurugram, serves IMT Manesar
  - Western Peripheral Expressway cloverleaf interchange at Pachgaon, serves Industrial Township at Pataudi
  - Dharuhera intersection with NH919 Rewari-Sohna, serves Dharuhera Industrial Township and Bhiwadi Industrial complex
  - Bawal, serves IMT Bawal
- In Rajasthan
  - NH15 T-intersection at Bawad
  - Behror interchange with RJ SH 14 Narnaul-Alwar, serves Nangal Choudhary Integrated Multimodel Logistics Hub
  - Kotputli interchange at NH37B to Neem-Ka-Thana
  - Shahpura industrial township
  - Chomu industrial township
  - Jaipur interchanges at NH52, NH2C and NH48

== Future: Delhi–Jaipur New Expressway (Delhi-Jaipur Super Expressway) ==
NH-352B Delhi-Jaipur Super Expressway will be a 195kms long greenfield expressway as an alternative to the existing "NH48 Delhi-Jaipur Expressway". This new 8 lane on each carriageway (expandable to 16 lanes) super expressway will start from the Kherki Dhaula Toll Plaza on Dwarka Expressway in New Gurgaon, go via IMT Bawal and end at Chandwaji on NH48 in Rajasthan. It will reduce the distance between the two cities by around 40 km.

In 2006–07, the Ministry of Road Transport and Highways of the UPA government conceive this project. In 2011, detailed project planning commenced. In 2012, Haryana and Rajasthan Governments approved the proposed alignment. In 2015, the Highway Minister Nitin Gadkari expedited ₹32,800 crores stalled project, by revising the alignment so that the expressway starts from Kherki Dhaula Toll Plaza instead of originally planned point of origin at Indira Gandhi International Airport.

== See also ==
- National highways of India
- Expressways & highways in Haryana
