= National Highway 334B (India) =

National Highway in India

National Highway 334B
- Map of the National Highway in red

Route information
- Auxiliary route of NH 34
- Length: 236 km (147 mi)

Major junctions
- East end: Meerut
- West end: Loharu

Location
- Country: India
- States: Uttar Pradesh, Haryana
- Primary destinations: Sonipat, Kharkhauda, Sampla, Jhajjar, Charkhi Dadri

Highway system
- Roads in India; Expressways; National; State; Asian
← NH 34	→ NH 709

National Highway 334B, commonly called NH 334B is a national highway in India. It is a spur road of National Highway 34. NH-334B traverses the states of Uttar Pradesh and Haryana in India.

== Route ==
Meerut, Baghpat, Sonipat, Kharkhauda, Hassangarh Sampla, Jhajjar, Charkhi Dadri,(Badhra) Loharu

== Junctions ==
NH 34 Terminal near Meerut.
NH 709B near Baghpat
NH 44 near Sonipat
NH 352A near Sonipat
NH 9 near Kharkhauda
SH 20 near Hassangarh
NH 352 near Jhajjar
NH 152D near Charkhi Dadri
NH 148B near Charkhi Dadri
NH 709 Terminal near Loharu.

== See also ==
- List of national highways in India
- List of national highways in India by state
