= Delhi–Chandigarh Expressway =

Planned expressway in northern India

- Delhi Akshardham–Chandigarh Yamunabank Expressway

Route information
- Length: 250 km (160 mi) Approximate; Delhi–Ambala section
- Existed: 2022–present

Location
- Country: India
- States: Delhi, Haryana, Punjab
- Major cities: Sonipat, Panipat, Karnal, Kurukshetra, Yamunanagar, Ambala

Highway system
- Roads in India; Expressways; National; State; Asian

The Delhi–Chandigarh Expressway (Delhi Akshardham–Chandigarh Yamunabank Expressway) is an under-construction 270-kilometre-long (170 mi), six-lane, access-controlled, greenfield expressway in North India, designed to provide a high-speed corridor connecting national capital Delhi to Chandigarh along the banks of the Yamuna river primarily through Haryana state, reducing travel time between Delhi and Chandigarh to approximately 2.5 hours. The expressway will serve as an alternative to the congested National Highway 44 (NH-44, Grand Trunk Road) and Delhi–Dehradun Expressway's Shamli-Ambala-Chandigarh spur, to decongest the traffic and boost economy.

== History ==
The concept of a dedicated expressway between Delhi and northern cities like Chandigarh gained momentum during the planning of the Bharatmala Pariyojana in the mid-2010s. In 2022, Dushyant Chautala, then Deputy Chief Minister of Haryana, announced the development of this greenfield expressway by National Highways Authority of India along the Yamuna banks from Delhi to Ambala during infrastructure inaugurations in Sonipat. The project received central government approval later that year, with the National Highways Authority of India (NHAI) tasked with preparation of the Detailed Project Report (DPR).

== Benefits ==
The expressway is projected to spur industrial growth in Haryana's riverside districts, enhancing logistics for sectors like automobiles and agriculture, boost real estate values along the route, and promote tourism by improving access to Yamuna ghats and nearby heritage sites.

== Route ==
The expressway begins in eastern Delhi and runs parallel to the Yamuna river's eastern bank initially, before transitioning along the western bank in Haryana where it will run between Yamuna river and NH-44.

- Delhi state
  - Swaminarayan Akshardham Temple Delhi on eastern bank of Yamuna river, begins from the intersection of Noida–Greater Noida Expressway spur of Yamuna Expressway and NH-9 Pithoragarh-Delhi-Hisar-Dabwali National Highway, and runs between eastern bank of Yamuna and NH-709B Delhi-Baghpat National Highway.
- Uttar Pradesh state
  - Baghpat (south of) from Eastern Peripheral Expressway switch to western bank of Yamuna river into Haryana state via Western Peripheral Expressway.
- Haryana state (greenfield alignment runs between western bank of Yamuna river and NH-44)
  - Sonipat district on western bank of Yamuna river
  - Panipat district (Bapauli)
  - Karnal district
    - Kunjpura
    - Indri
  - Kurukshetra district (Ladwa)
  - Yamunanagar district (Radaur), between Ladwa-Radaur
  - Ambala district (Barara), intersect Ambala-Shamli Expressway
  - Panchkula district
- Chandigarh Union Territory and joint capital of Haryana and Punjab states

== Present status ==
- November 2024: The NHAI was preparing the DPR.

== See also ==
- Industrial corridors of India
- List of megaprojects in India
