= National Highway 148BB (India) =

National Highway in India

National Highway 148BB
- Map of National Highway 148BB in red

Route information
- Length: 37.7 km (23.4 mi)

Major junctions
- North end: Jakhal
- South end: Sunam

Location
- Country: India
- States: Punjab
- Primary destinations: Lehragaga

Highway system
- Roads in India; Expressways; National; State; Asian
← NH 148B	→ NH 52

National Highway 148BB, commonly referred to as NH 148BB is a national highway in India. It is a spur road of National Highway 48 in the state of Punjab in India.

== Route ==
Jakhal, Lehragaga, Chhajli, Sunam.

== Junctions ==
NH 148B near Jakhal

== See also ==
- List of national highways in India
- List of national highways in India by state
