= Ambala–Chandigarh Expressway =

Road in India

Ambala Chandigarh Expressway

Route information
- Length: 35 km (22 mi)

Major junctions
- West end: Ambala
- East end: Chandigarh

Location
- Country: India
- States: Haryana, Punjab

Highway system
- Roads in India; Expressways; National; State; Asian

Ambala Chandigarh Expressway is four-lane 35 km long highway, high-traffic density corridor of Ambala-Chandigarh section (km 5.735 to km 39.960 on NH-152 and 0 km to 0.871 km on NH 5) on BOT basis, was completed in 30 months at a cost of ₹2.98 billion (US$31 million) The expressway has been operational since December 2009 and was constructed by the GMR Group with assistance from the World Bank.

38 km south of Ambala at existing NH152 (Ambala-Pehowa-Narwana-Fatehabad-Sirsa), it connects with the controlled access tolled Ambala–Narnaul Expressway (Trans-Haryana Expressway).

== See also ==
- Ambala-Jagadhri highway
- National Highway 22, which this Expressway has been part of
