= National Highway 344 (India) =

National highway in northern India

National Highway 344
- Map of the National Highway in red

Route information
- Auxiliary route of NH 44
- Length: 184.9 km (114.9 mi)

Major junctions
- West end: Ambala
- East end: Roorkee

Location
- Country: India
- States: Haryana, Punjab, Uttar Pradesh, Uttarakhand
- Primary destinations: Shahzadpur - Saha - Yamunanagar - Saharanpur

Highway system
- Roads in India; Expressways; National; State; Asian
← NH 44	→ NH 334

National Highway 344 (NH 344) is a national highway in India running from Ambala in Haryana to Roorkee in Uttarakhand. It is a secondary route of National Highway 44. NH-344 runs in the states of Haryana, Punjab, Uttar Pradesh and Uttarakhand in India.

== Route ==
Schematic map of National Highways in India

The route of NH 344 transits four states of North India, namely Haryana, Punjab, Uttar Pradesh and Uttarakhand.

NH151 connects Ambala, Shahzadpur, Saha, Yamunanagar, Saharanpur and terminates at Roorkee.

== Junctions ==
NH 44 Terminal near Ambala.
NH 7 near Shahzadpur
NH 444A near Saha
NH 907 near Yamuna Nagar
NH 709B near Saharanpur
NH 307 near Chhutmalpur
NH 334 Terminal near Roorkee.

== See also ==
- Highways in Haryana
- List of national highways in India
- List of national highways in India by state
