= National Highway 352R (India) =

National Highway in India

National Highway 352R
- Map of National Highway 352R in red

Route information
- Auxiliary route of NH 52
- Length: 22.5 km (14.0 mi)

Major junctions
- West end: Jhajjar
- East end: Bahadurgarh

Location
- Country: India
- States: Haryana

Highway system
- Roads in India; Expressways; National; State; Asian
← NH 352	→ NH 9

National Highway 352R, commonly referred to as NH 352R is a national highway in India. It is a spur road of National Highway 52. NH-352R traverses the state of Haryana in India.

== Route ==
NH 352R connects Jhajjar, Dulhera, Daboda Khurd, Nuna Majra and Bahadurgarh.

== Junctions ==
NH 352 near Jhajjar, India
NH 9 near Bahadurgarh, India

== See also ==
- List of national highways in India
- List of national highways in India by state
