= National Highway 148B (India) =

National Highway in India

National Highway 148B
- Map of National Highway 148B in red

Route information
- Auxiliary route of NH 48
- Length: 425 km (264 mi)

Major junctions
- South end: Kotputli
- North end: Bathinda

Location
- Country: India
- States: Haryana, Rajasthan, Punjab
- Primary destinations: Narnaul, Mahendergarh, Charkhi Dadri, Bhiwani, Bawani Khera, Hansi, Barwala, Tohana, Jakhal Mandi Mansa

Highway system
- Roads in India; Expressways; National; State; Asian
← NH 48	→ NH 54

National Highway 148B (NH 148B) starts at Kotputli, state of Rajasthan and ends at Bathinda, state of Punjab. The major towns are in succession of distance on this highway: Narnaul, Mahendergarh, Charkhi Dadri, Bhiwani, Hansi, Barwala, Bhimewala Tohana, Moonak, Jakhal, Bareta, Budhlada, Bhikhi, Mansa and Maur. This highway meets with National Highway 54 at Bathinda. The highway is 427 km (265 mi) long and runs all within the states of Haryana, Punjab and Rajasthan.

== Route ==
The route of NH 148B passes through the following towns and villages: Kotputli, Narnaul, Mahendergarh, Charkhi Dadri, Bhiwani, Bawani Khera, Hansi, Barwala, Tohana, Jakhal Mandi, Moonak, Budhlada, Bhikhi, Mansa, Maur and Bathinda.

== Junctions ==
NH 48 Terminal near Kotputli.
NH 11 near Narnaul.
NH 152D near Narnaul.
NH 334B near Charkhi Dadri.
NH 709 near Bhiwani.
NH 709A near Bhiwani.
NH 9 near Hansi.
NH 52 near Tohana
NH 703 near Mansa.
NH 254 near Maur.
NH 54 Terminal near Bathinda.ENDS IN PUNJAB

== See also ==
- List of national highways in India
- List of national highways in India by state
- National Highways Development Project
