= State Highway 22 (Haryana) =

Road in Haryana, India

State Highway 22

Location
- Country: India
- State: Haryana

Highway system
- Roads in India; Expressways; National; State; Asian; State Highways in Haryana

State Highway 22 in Haryana is meant for Bahadurgarh-Jhajjar-Kosli-Kanina. It is a two lane road. There is no railway crossing between Bahadurgarh and Jhajjar. But between Jhajjar and Kosli there is a railway crossing just after crossing Jhajjar . Distance of Bahadurgarh-Jhajjar road is 28 km. The total length of State Highway is of 77.61 km.

== See also ==
- List of state highways in Haryana
