= State Highway 12 (Haryana) =

Road in Haryana, India

State Highway 12 in Haryana is meant for Karnal-Assandh-Jind-Hansi-Tosham-Sodiwas. The total length of State Highway is of 192.32 km.

== See also ==
- List of state highways in Haryana
