= National Highway 907G (India) =

National Highway in India

National Highway 907G
- Map of National Highway 907G in red

Route information
- Auxiliary route of NH 7
- Length: 14.9 km (9.3 mi)

Major junctions
- South end: Jagadhri
- North end: Bilaspur

Location
- Country: India
- States: Haryana

Highway system
- Roads in India; Expressways; National; State; Asian
← NH 907	→ NH 907G

National Highway 907G, commonly referred to as NH 907G is a national highway in India. It is a spur road of National Highway 7. NH-907G traverses the state of Haryana in India.

== Route ==
NH-907G connects Jagadhri, Jaroda, Budheri, Bherthal, Mahmoodpur, Salempur Banger and Bilaspur in Haryana.

== Junctions ==
NH 907 Terminal near Jagadhri.

== See also ==
- List of national highways in India
- List of national highways in India by state
