= National Highway 10 (India, old numbering) =

Old numbering of road in India

National Highway 10
- Map of Old NH 10 in red
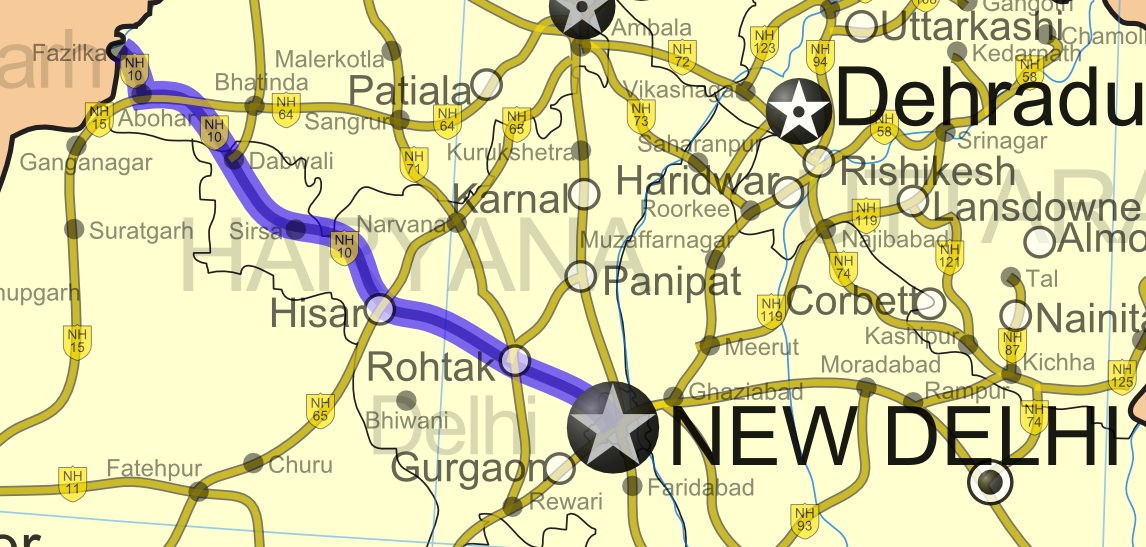
- Road map of India with National Highway 10 highlighted in solid blue color

Route information
- Length: 403 km (250 mi)

Major junctions
- East end: Delhi
- List: NH 1 in Delhi; NH 2 in Delhi; NH 8 in Delhi; NH 24 in Delhi; NH 71 in Rohtak; NH 71A in Rohtak; NH 65 in Hisar; NH 64 in Mandi Dabwali; NH 15 in Malaut
- West end: Fazilka

Location
- Country: India
- States: Delhi: 18 km Haryana: 313 km Punjab: 72 km
- Primary destinations: Delhi - Rohtak - Hisar - Sirsa - Fazilka

Highway system
- Roads in India; Expressways; National; State; Asian
← NH 9	→ NH 11

National Highway 10 was a National Highway, length 403 km (250 mi), in North India that originated at Delhi and ended at the town of Fazilka in Punjab near the Indo-Pak Border.

== New numbering ==
Due to Rationalization of Numbering Systems of National Highways by Ministry of Road Transport and Highways, old NH 10 has been renumbered as follows.

- Fazilka - Abohar - Malout section is part of new National Highway No. 7
- Malout - Sirsa - Hisar - Delhi section is part of new National Highway No. 9

== Upgrades ==
=== Four-laning between Hissar and Rohtak ===
As of 2016 June, a special purpose vehicle, Rohtak-Hissar Tollway Pvt Ltd, completed the widening of the stretch from Hissar to Rohtak to four lanes (two lanes in each direction with wide paved shoulders and a tree-lined median in the middle). The concession period for the project, including the construction period, is 22 years.

The National Highways Authority of India's National Highways Development Project NHAI NHDP Phase-3 project has acquired additional 591.84 hectares of land for road widening and building:

- 2 toll road plazas:
  - Near Hansi, towards Hisar
  - Between Maham and Rohtak
- 3 overbridges:
  - Hisar-Jakhal Railway line near Hisar
  - Foot over-bridge near Hisar Cantt.)
  - Jind-Rohtak railway line near Rohtak
- 13 underpasses
  - 6 pedestrian underpasses in the connecting villages
  - 7 vehicular underpasses in the connecting villages
- 5 bypasses
  - Hansi bypass
  - Maham bypass
  - Kharkada bypass
  - Madina bypass
  - Rohtak South-West NH10 bypass across NH 71

=== Four-laning between Hisar to Sirsa and Dabwali ===
The project for widening Hisar-Sirsa-Dabwali segments in Haryana to four lanes on Build–operate–transfer (BOT) toll road mode is on a design, built, finance, operate and transfer (DBFOT) pattern with a concession period of 24 years including a 2.5 years construction period. The project was started in 2015. It also covers the following:

- 1 railway over-bridge (ROB)
- 10 flyovers
- 1 major bridges
- 11 minor bridge
- Sirsa bypass

== Safety ==
Safety improvements undertaken by NHAI and PWD since 2012 have resulted in a decline in road fatalities on NH10. Scheduled improvements include rumble strips, additional signage, and reflective markers.

== Popular media ==
The Bollywood thriller movie NH10 produced by Anushka Sharma is based on a story of travel on the National Highway 10. However, the condition of the highway is much better than as compared to what was shown in the movie, and it does not pass through Gurgaon.
