= National Highway 444A (India) =

National highway in Haryana, India

National Highway 444A
- Map of National Highway 444A in red

Route information
- Auxiliary route of NH 44
- Length: 42 km (26 mi)

Major junctions
- North end: Ambala
- South end: Shahabad

Location
- Country: India
- States: Haryana
- Primary destinations: Saha

Highway system
- Roads in India; Expressways; National; State; Asian
← NH 44	→ NH 44

National Highway 444A is a national highway entirely in the state of Haryana in India. NH 444A is a secondary route of National Highway 44.

== Route ==
Ambala - Saha - Shahabad.

== Junctions ==
NH 44 Terminal near Ambala.
NH 344 near Saha.
NH 44 Terminal near Sahabad.

== See also ==
- List of national highways in India
- List of national highways in India by state
