= Panipat Elevated Expressway =

Road in India

Panipat Elevated Corridor

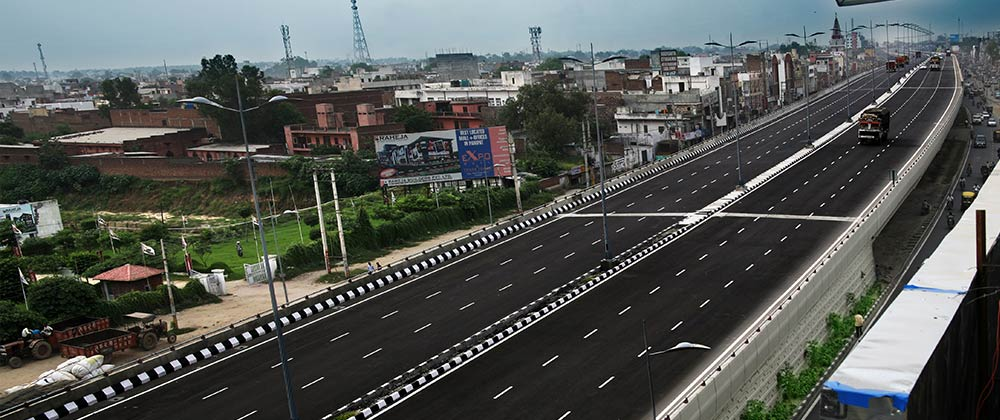
- Panipat Elevated Corridor

Route information
- Maintained by L&T Panipat Elevated Corridor Limited
- Length: 10 km (6.2 mi)
- Existed: July 2008–present

Location
- Country: India
- State: Haryana
- Major cities: Panipat

Highway system
- Roads in India; Expressways; National; State; Asian; State Highways in Haryana

Panipat Elevated Corridor is an Indian elevated six-lane expressway located in Panipat, Haryana. The entire stretch has been developed into an elevated six-lane access-controlled highway to by-pass the city of Panipat.

The expressway was built to ease the traffic on NH-1 (now NH-44, also known as the Grand Trunk Road) between Delhi and Amritsar. It is 10 kilometres (6.2 mi) long. This INR 4.22 billion build-operate-transfer (BoT) project has been executed by L&T Panipat Elevated Corridor Limited (L&T PECL), in a time period of 28 months at a cost of INR 325 crores. National Highways Authority of India had allotted a 20-year concession period (which started in January 2006) to L&T PECL to finance, design, build, operate and maintain this facility. It's southern edge connects to Delhi–Panipat Expressway.

== See also ==
- Delhi–Panipat Expressway
- Expressways & highways in Haryana
