= National Highway 703 (India) =

National highway in India

National Highway 703
- Map of the National Highway in red

Route information
- Auxiliary route of NH 3
- Length: 431 km (268 mi)

Major junctions
- North end: Jalandhar, Punjab
- South end: Churu, Rajasthan

Location
- Country: India
- States: Punjab, Haryana, Rajasthan
- Primary destinations: Nakodar - Shahkot -Moga - Barnala -Mansa - Sardulgarh-SirsaHaryana,-Nohar -Sahawa - Taranagar

Highway system
- Roads in India; Expressways; National; State; Asian
← NH 3	→ NH 52

Schematic map of National Highways in India

National Highway 703 (NH 703) is a National Highway in Northern India. NH 703 connects Jalandar in Punjab, Sirsa in Haryana and Churu in Rajasthan, running a distance of 342 km (213 mi). NH 703 starts at the junction of NH 3 at Jalandar and traverses down to Churu to meet NH 52.

== Route ==
Punjab

Jalandhar, Nakodar, Shahkot, Moga, Badhni, Barnala, Handiaya, Mansa, Jhunir, Sardulgarh - Haryana border.

Haryana

Punjab border - Sirsa. Nohar- Sahawa- Taranagar and terminating at NH 52 in Churu

== Junctions ==
NH 3 Terminal near Jalandhar.
NH 703A near Jalandhar.
NH 703B and
NH 5 near Moga
NH 7 near Barnala.
NH 148B near Mansa.
NH 9 Terminal near Sirsa.

== See also ==
- List of national highways in India
- National Highways Development Project
