= Stephan Swanson =

South African marine researcher

- Born: 16 September 1966 (age 59); Cape Town, R.S.A.
- Occupation: Tour guide
- Spouse: Bonny Swanson
- Website: Shark Explorers website

Stephan Swanson came to prominence as a marine researcher when he successfully placed the satellite transmitter on the famous Great white shark Nicole, the first great white shark ever to be tracked on a 20,000 kilometer migration from South Africa to Australia and back. Due to his ability to handle large marine predators, such as the great white shark, he was contracted as an expedition biologist to travel to Guadeloupe and place satellite transmitters on the dorsal fins of Great Whites. His historical capture and release of a 5m long, 1800 kilogram great white shark is documented in the National Geographic Marine Special "Ultimate Shark".

Swanson is currently co-owner of False Bay White Shark Adventures (trading as Shark Explorers) which was established in 2008. They provide shark scuba diving excursions.

== Scientific Articles ==
- Developing techniques and procedures for large shark telemetry
- White shark abundance not a causative factor in shark attack incidence
- White shark cage diving - Cause for concern?
- Transoceanic migrations of a white shark

== Television appearances ==
- Ultimate Shark - National Geographic
- Sharkville - National Geographic archived from the original at the Wayback Machine
- Pasella - SABC2
