= Bhikhi, India =

Bhikhi
- municipal committee
- Location in Punjab, India Bhikhi (India)
- Coordinates: 30.07°N 75.53°E
- bhikhi Country: India
- bhikhi State: Punjab
- District: Mansa
- Elevation: 219 m (719 ft)

Population (2024)
  - Total: 25,500

Languages
  - Official: Punjabi
- Time zone: UTC+5:30 (IST)
- city PIN Code: 151504
- Vehicle registration: pb31
- Website: Bhikhi

Bhikhi is a municipal committee in Mansa district in the state of Punjab, India.

== Geography ==
Bhikhi is located at 30.07°N 75.53°E. It has an average elevation of 219 metres (718 feet).

== Demographics ==
As of 2001 India census, Bhikhi had a population of 15,078. Males constitute 53% of the population and females 47%. Bhikhi has an average literacy rate of 53%, lower than the national average of 59.5%; with male literacy of 57% and female literacy of 48%. 14% of the population is under 6 years of age.
