= Naguran =

- Village
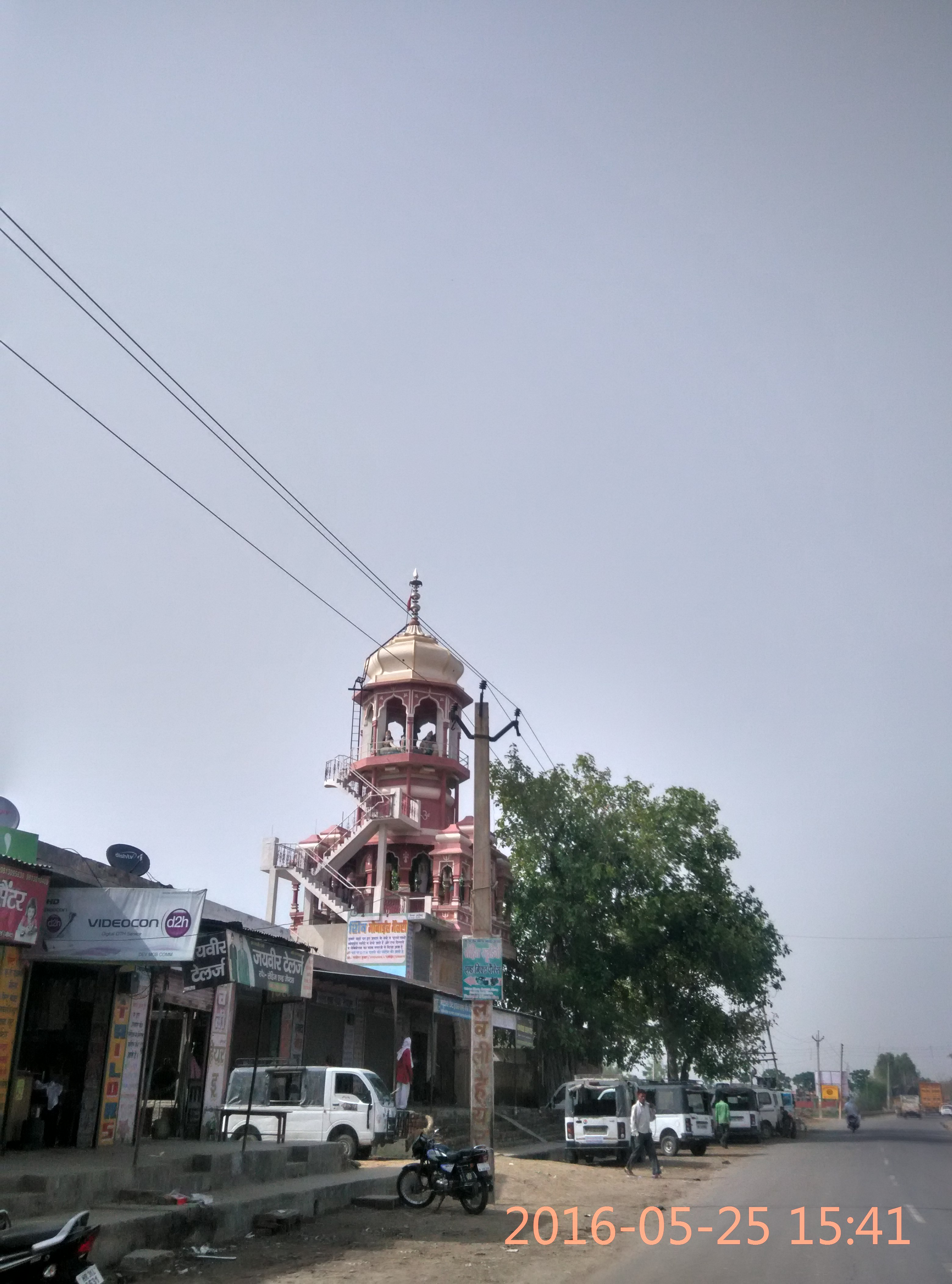
- A Temple along the Chandigarh Road, Naguran Village, Kaithal Jind Road, Haryana
- Interactive map of Naguran
- Country: India
- State: Haryana
- District: Jind

Naguran is one of the biggest villages in Jind district, Haryana state, India. The pin code of Naguran Jind is 126125. Jind, the nearest city is around 14–15 km away from the village.

It is surrounded by Jind-Chandigarh road & Jind-Karnal road. Naguran has many neighbour villages like Shahpur, Dahola, Hasanpur, Alewa, Dilwala, Mandi, Baddana, Khera, Samdo etc.

== Demographics ==
At the 2011 Census of India, Naguran had a population of 11614 (appr. 100000th part of India's population) of which 6203 are males while 5411 are females residing in 2046 homes. In Naguran village population of children with age 0-6 is 1457 which makes up 12.55% of total population of village. Average Sex Ratio of Naguran village is 872 which is lower than Haryana state average of 879. Child Sex Ratio for the Naguran as per census is 803, lower than Haryana average of 834.

Naguran village has a lower literacy rate that the average rate in Haryana. In 2011, the literacy rate of Naguran village was 67.93% compared to 75.55% of Haryana. In Naguran Male literacy stands at 78.18% while female literacy rate was 56.32%.

The main mother-tongue language is Hindi, but the dialect majorly spoken is Haryanvi.

== Government ==
As per constitution of India and Panchayati Raj Act, New Govt. headed by Manohar Lal Khattar. Naguran village is administered by educated (10th pass) Sarpanch (Head of Village) who is elected representative of village. Presently, It comes under Uchana constituency. The Jind district administration executes the government policies and plans for Naguran village.the sarpanch of naguran is kuldeep Khatkar s/o Shab Khatkar.

Naguran has two Gram Panchayats. Naguran village panchayat is one of the 22 panchayats of Alewa Block. Alewa block is one of the seven blocks of district Jind in Haryana.

== See also ==
- Jind
