= South African Marine Predator Lab =

South African research institute

The South African Marine Predator Lab (SAMPLA) is a multidisciplinary research institute aimed at uncovering the lives of the marine predators of Southern Africa. SAMPLA’s primary goal is to produce accurate and essential scientific information on marine predators and create awareness on the need to understand and conserve the marine predators and ecosystems of the world.

SAMPLA was established by Ryan Johnson, Enrico Gennari, Stephan Swanson and Toby Keswick in the Summer of 2008

SAMPLA undertakes, disseminates and promotes scientific research aimed at producing unique scientific knowledge on South Africa’s marine predators.

== Research projects ==
The white shark research program at Mossel Bay is multi-faceted, but centred on three main academic pillars. These are:

- Collection of data for collaborate projects.
- Conduction of novel research projects by SAMPLA scientists.
- Offering research facilities, supervision and guidance for graduate student projects at South African universities.

=== Main projects ===
- Horizontal and vertical movements of the white shark
- Bite kinematics of white sharks
- Predator-prey dynamics
- White shark genetic profile
- White shark population dynamics
- Thermal eco-physiology of the white shark
