= Agasanal =

- village
- Agasanal is in Bijapur district
- Interactive map of Agasanal
- Coordinates: 17.0500°N 75.7702°E
- Country: India
- State: Karnataka
- District: Bijapur
- Talukas: Indi

Government
  - Body: Village Panchayat

Languages
  - Official: Kannada
- Time zone: UTC+5:30 (IST)
- Vehicle registration: KA
- Nearest city: Bijapur
- Civic agency: Village Panchayat
- Website: karnataka.gov.in

Agasanal is a village in the southern state of Karnataka, India. It is located in the Indi taluk of Bijapur district in Karnataka.

This village has two temples, Madrashab Temple and Mallikarjun Temple.

Agasanal is around 27 km north of the city of Bijapur and also near the village of Horti.

== See also ==
- Bijapur district
- Districts of Karnataka
