= Haryana Roadways =

Indian state public bus transport company

Haryana Roadways State Transport HR
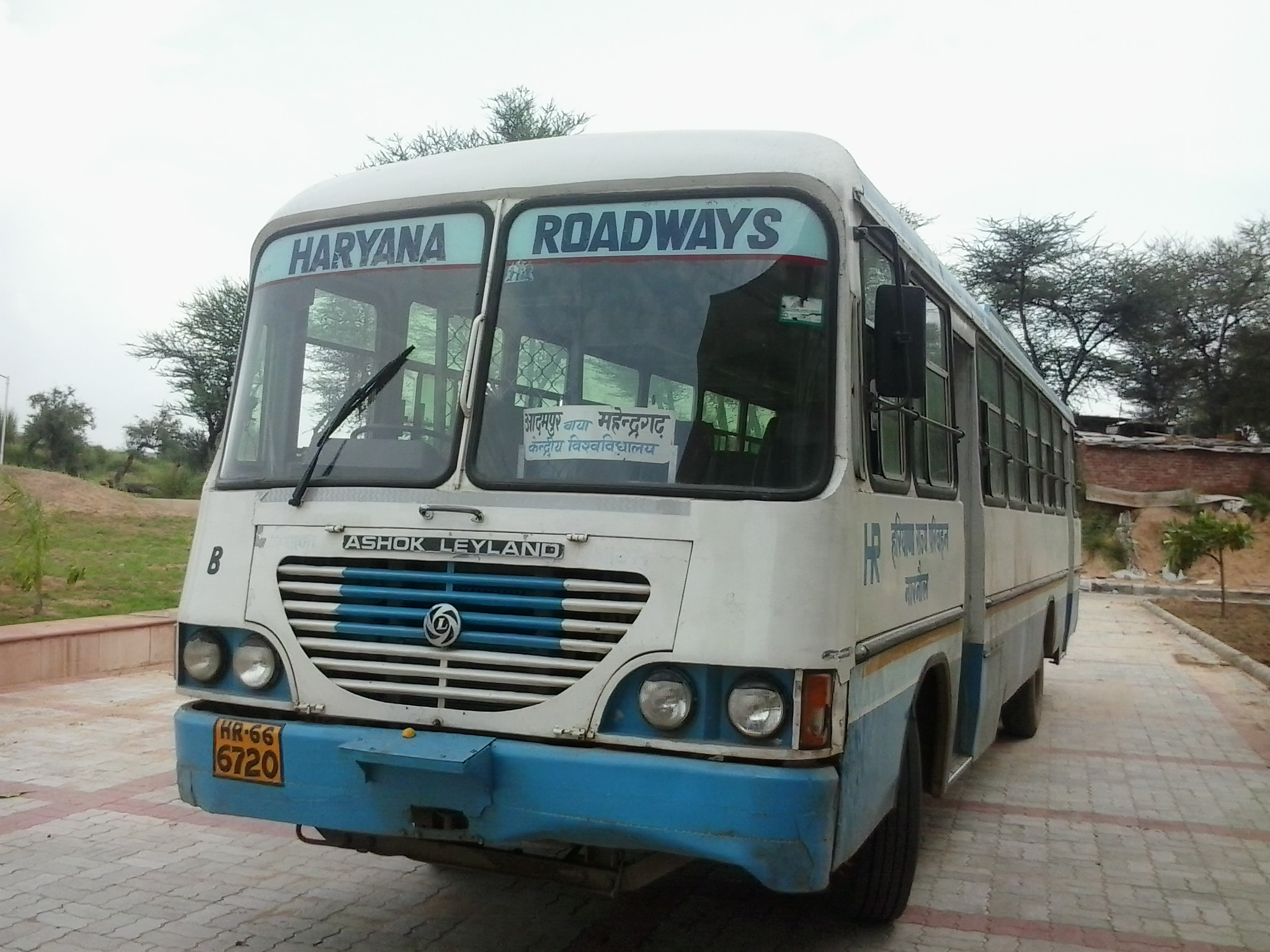
- Type: Public Sector Corporation under the Ministry of Transport of the Government of Haryana
- Industry: Public Transport
- Founded: 1 November 1966
- Headquarters: Chandigarh, India
- Area served: Haryana, Chandigarh, Delhi, Rajasthan and neighboring states
- Key people: Sumita Mishra IAS Transport Commissioner, Chander Parkash IAS; Director General Transport
- Products: Public transport services
- Website: hartrans.gov.in

Haryana Roadways State Transport (HR) is the public transport unit of the Government of Haryana in India. Haryana Roadways is a major part of Haryana Transport Department. It is the principal service provider for passenger transport in the state. The Consistent quality and punctuality of the service provider, apart from the polite behaviour of the staff have earned a name in all neighbouring state. They have become the first choice of the passengers. Due to its high speed and excellent service, it is called Haryana ka Jahaj or Ship of Haryana. It is second only to Pepsu Road Transport Corporation buses jointly run by Punjab Government and Northern Railways.

== History ==
In 1966, when Haryana was carved out of Punjab there arose a need of separate transport unit which would connect every part of the state with other parts effectively. So, in 1966 HRTL was established with two Regional Transport Authorities. On 1 December 1987, three RTAs were appointed at Ambala, Hisar and Faridabad. On 16 January 1991, three more RTAs were created at Rohtak, Karnal and Rewari. Now, each district headquarters has Regional Transport Office (RTO) headed by Regional Transport Secretary and vehicle registration and driving licenses can be obtained from each district headquarters (RTA office) and Tehsil headquarters (usually SDO-Civil i.e. Subdivisional officer - Civil).

== Introduction ==
The office of the Director General State Transport is responsible for providing well-coordinated, economical, safe and efficient transport action services to the public of the State. Haryana Roadways, a State Government Undertaking, is the principal service provider for passenger transport in the State. Over the years, Haryana Roadways has earned a name for itself for the range and quality of services provided by it. In tune with the emerging requirements of the travelling public, Haryana Roadways has undertaken a series of new initiatives to provide better services to its clients. New Volvo AC bus services 'Saarthi' have been introduced on Chandigarh-Delhi-Gurgaon, Chandigarh-Delhi-Faridabad routes. Some of the trips are also touching the Indira Gandhi International (IGI) Airport and the domestic Airport, Delhi. Ten such buses are already in operation.

== Fleet of buses ==
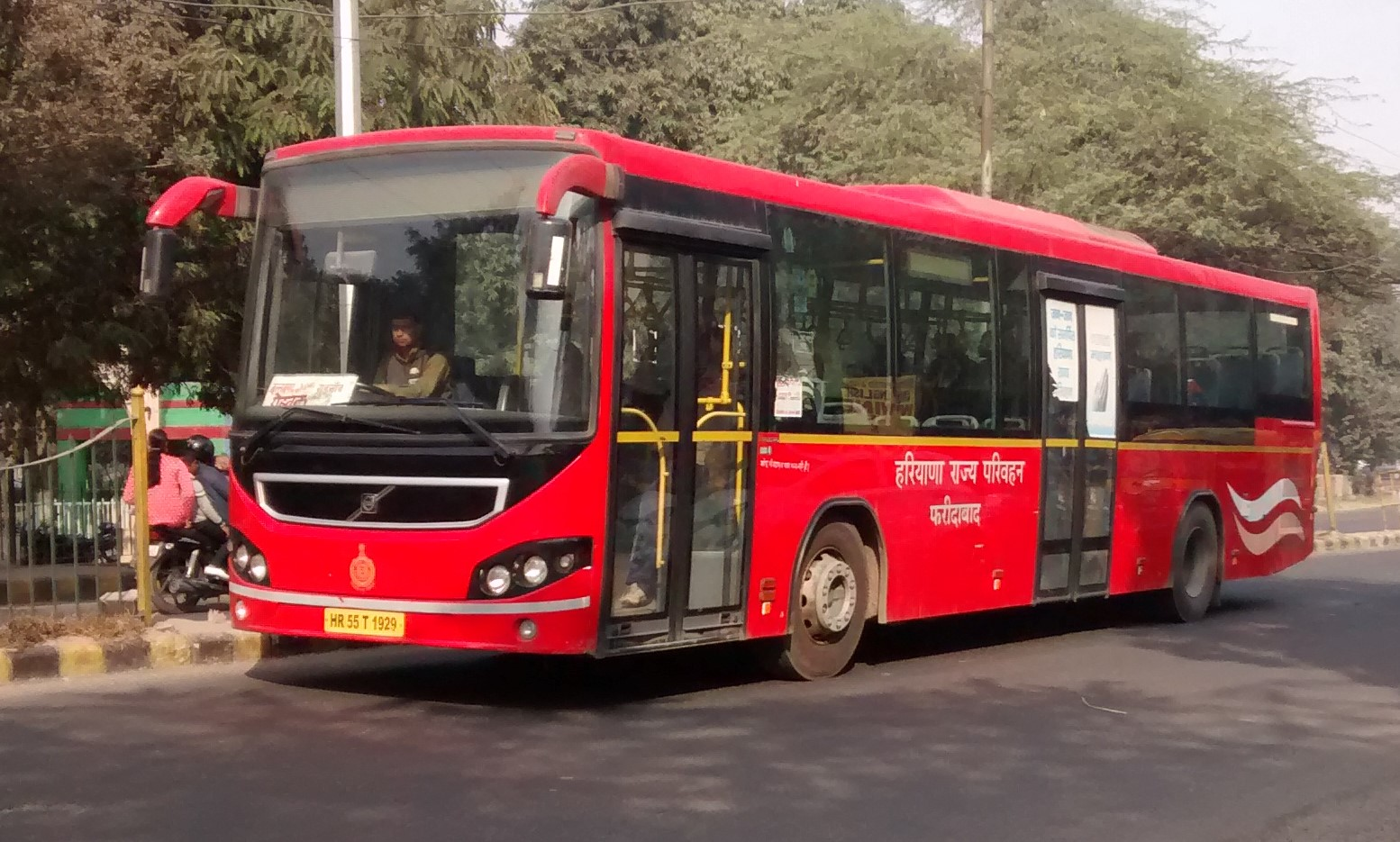
A Haryana Roadways Volvo bus in Faridabad

Haryana Roadways is the principal service provider for passenger transport in the State. It has a fleet of approx. 4500 buses being operated by 24 depots, each headed by a General Manager, and 17 sub-depots functioning under the depot concerned. These services are being provided to every part of the State as well as to important destinations in the neighbouring States. Haryana Roadways plies on an average 1.11 million Km every day and carries 1.12 million passengers daily on 1116 Intra-State and 446 Inter-State routes. New Volvo AC bus services 'Saarthi' have been introduced on certain routes. Some of the trips are also touching the Indira Gandhi International (IGI) Airport and the domestic Airport Delhi.

A new 'Haryana Gaurav' bus service has been introduced, popularly known as 'Aam Adami Ki Khas Bus', providing facilities like seats, FM Radio, Mobile Charger, Pneumatically Operated Door, tinted Glass & Curtains etc. at ordinary bus fare. This bus over time would become the main stay of Haryana Roadways for its distinct operations. About 200 buses are already in operation on different routes.

'Haryana Uday' CNG bus services are launched in the National Capital Region of Delhi. 300 buses are already in operation on different routes within the NCR of the state.

== HREC ==
Haryana Roadways Engineering Corporation Ltd. is a subsidiary of Haryana Roadways. It was incorporated on 27 November 1987 in Gurgaon. It was established to fabricate bus bodies, mainly for Haryana Roadways. It fabricated 503 bodies in 2010-2011 alone. It is a profit making organisation which registered a profit of ₹5.86 crores in year 2010–2011.

== Road network in Haryana ==
Haryana has a vast network of at least 32 National Highways (NH) with total length of 2,484 km (1,543 mi), 11 Expressways including three National Expressway, State Highways (SH) with total length of 1,801 km (1,119 mi), Major District Roads (MDR) major district roads with 1,395 km (867 mi) length and Other District Roads (ODR) with a length of 26,022 km (16,169 mi) (2016).

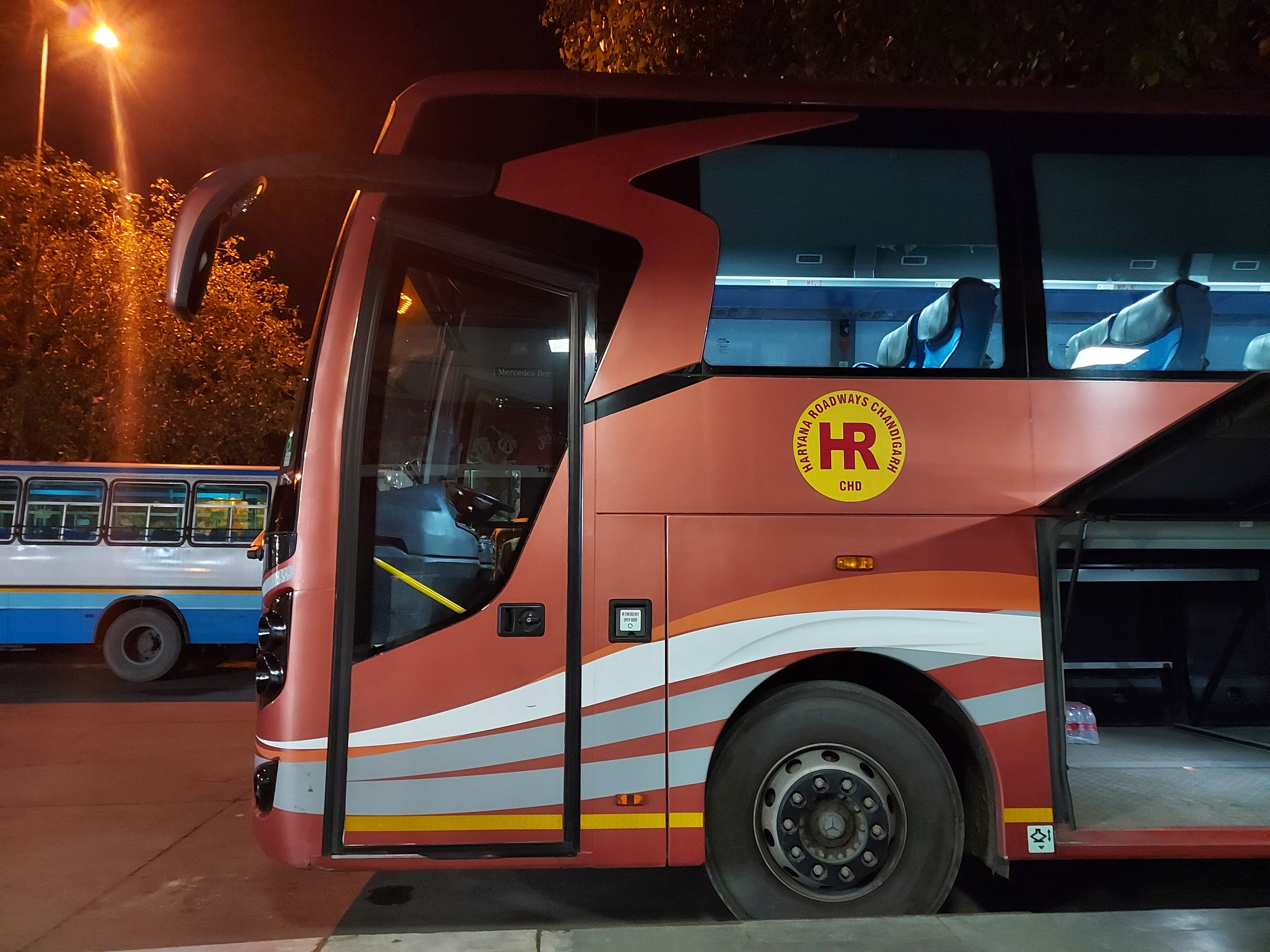
Haryana Roadways 'Saarthi' Mercedes-Benz at ISBT 17, Chandigarh

== See also ==
- List of highways in Haryana
- List of national highways in India
- Railway in Haryana
- Airports in Haryana
