= National Highway 709A (India) =

National Highway in India

National Highway 709A
- Map of the National Highway in red

Route information
- Auxiliary route of NH 9
- Length: 264 km (164 mi)

Major junctions
- West end: Bhiwani
- East end: Garhmukteshwar

Location
- Country: India
- States: Haryana, Uttar Pradesh

Highway system
- Roads in India; Expressways; National; State; Asian
| ← NH 9 | → NH 34 |

National Highway 709A, commonly called NH 709A is a national highway in India. It is a greenfield spur road of NH-709. NH-709A traverses the states of Haryana and Uttar Pradesh in India. Karnal to Meerut section has been upgraded from 4 lanes to 6 lanes by Public Works Department, Haryana.

== Route ==
Haryana

Bhiwani - Mundal - Jind - Karnal - Uttar Pradesh Border.

Uttar Pradesh

Haryana Border - Shamli - Budhana - Meerut - Garhmukteshwar.

== Junctions list ==
NH 709 Terminal near Bhiwani.
NH 9 near Mundhal Khurd.
NH 352 near Jind.
NH 44 near Karnal.
NH 709B near Shamli.
NH 709AD near Shamli.
NH 34 near Meerut.
NH 9 Terminal near Garhmukteshwar.

== See also ==
- List of national highways in India
- List of national highways in India by state
