= Kharkara, Rajasthan =

Coordinates: 27°52′35″N 76°14′55″E

Kharkara is a village in Behror Tehsil in Alwar District in the state of Rajasthan, India. It is situated about 3 km west to Behror on Tasing road.

People in Kharkara are basically farmers in occupation.
