= National Highway 709B (India) =

National Highway in India

National Highway 709B
- Map of the National Highway in red

Route information
- Auxiliary route of NH 9
- Length: 155 km (96 mi)

Major junctions
- South end: NE 3 in Akshardham, New Delhi
- List: NH 9 in Khajoori Khas, New Delhi; NE 2 in Mavikala, Uttar Pradesh; NH 334B in Baghpat, Uttar Pradesh; NH 709A / NH 709AD in Shamli, Uttar Pradesh
- North end: NH 334 in Saharanpur, Uttar Pradesh

Location
- Country: India
- States: Delhi, Uttar Pradesh
- Primary destinations: Baghpat, Shamli

Highway system
- Roads in India; Expressways; National; State; Asian
← NE 3	→ NH 334

National Highway 709B is a National Highway in India. The highway originates from Akshardham in Delhi. It is a spur road of National Highway 9. NH-709B traverses the states of Delhi and Uttar Pradesh, passing through various towns and cities in Western Uttar Pradesh such as Baghpat, Baraut, Ailum, Shamli, Thanabhawan, Rampur Maniharan, Saharanpur, and Behat. Shamli acts as a major junction as two other major highways of the area (709A) and (709AD) intersect with (709B) at Shamli.

== Route ==
Akshardham – Khajoori Khas – Loni, Ghaziabad – Khekra – Baghpat – Baraut – Ailum – Kandhla – Shamli – Rampur Maniharan – Saharanpur – Behat

== See also ==
- List of national highways in India
- List of national highways in India by state
