= Bawal =

- Town
- Location in Haryana, India Bawal (India)
- Coordinates: 28.08°N 76.58°E
- Country: India
- State: Haryana
- District: Rewari

Area
  - Total: 332 km^{2} (128 sq mi)
- Elevation: 266 m (873 ft)

Population (2011)
  - Total: 16,776
  - Density: 50.5/km^{2} (131/sq mi)

Languages
  - Official: Hindi
  - Spoken: Haryanvi
- Time zone: UTC+5:30 (IST)
- PIN: 123501
- Telephone code: 01284
- ISO 3166 code: IN-HR
- Vehicle registration: HR 81
- Website: haryana.gov.in

Bawal is a big industrial town located, near Rewari city in Rewari district in Indian state of Haryana. It lies in the National Capital Region (NCR) of India. It is located on national highway NH 48 (formerly called NH 8), 11 km from Rewari, the district headquarter, 50 km from Gurugram and 91 km from New Delhi railway station. Bawal Tehsil is a part of the Rewari district. It was one of the three districts of the erstwhile Nabha State under British Raj.

== Geography ==
Bawal is located at coordinates 28.08°N 76.58°E.

It has an average elevation of 266 metres (872 feet).

=== Wildlife ===
==== HSIDC Bawal wetland ====
During the winter, over 4,000 migratory birds of 50 species from Siberia, Russia, Mongolia, Alaska and other parts of the United States are found at a wetland between Toyota Gosei Minda factory and Baba Pachpir Temple in the east HSIIDC Estate in Bawal. Bird species found here are wagtails, common teal, pintail, northern shoveller, garganey, eurasian coot, redshank, common sandpiper, ruff, wood sandpiper, marsh sandpiper, stint, kentish plover, greater sand plover, little ringed plover, white-tailed lapwing, greater flamingo, common pochard, ferruginous pochard, gulls and pied avocet. The pacific golden plover, rare a rare bird species from Western Alaska, has also been spotted.

Over 200,000 migratory birds have been spotted at Masani barrage wetland, which is 15 km southeast from Bawal wetland.

== Demographics ==
As of 2011 Indian Census, Bawal had a total population of 16,776, of which 8,828 were males and 7,948 were females.

== Administration ==
=== Haryana State Industrial and Infrastructure Development Corporation Industrial Model Township Bawal ===
Industrial Model Township Bawal in National Capital Region in Haryana, is a large industrial centre has been developed by the Haryana State Industrial and Infrastructure Development Corporation (HSIIDC) in 1995.It is a state government project to establish multiple auto parts manufacturers in mid-1990's. It also synergises with other IMT of Haryana along Delhi Western Peripheral Expressway such as IMT Bahadurgarh, IMT Kundli, Sonipat and IMT Manesar.

== Transport ==
The nearest airport is Indira Gandhi International Airport at New Delhi, about 75 km away. Bawal railway station is on the Alwar-Rewari railway line.

National Highway NH 48 (formerly called NH 8) passes through Bawal connecting it with the major cities of Delhi, Jaipur, Ahmedabad, Vadodra, Surat and Mumbai. The former NH 71 used to connect Bawal to Rewari before it was realigned and widened to a 4-lane toll road bypassing east of Rewari city. Now NH 352 (former name NH 71) (Narwana-Jind-Rohtak-Jhajjar-Rewari) terminates on NH 48 about 10 kilometres (6.2 mi) north of Bawal.

== See also ==
- Tourism in Haryana
