= Kandela =

Kandela Kandela
- Village
- Location in Uttar Pradesh, India Kandela (India)
- Coordinates: 29.45°N 77.32°E
- Country: India
- State: Uttar Pradesh
- District: Shamli Newly Formed
- Elevation: 248 m (814 ft)

Population (2010)
  - Total: 14,500

Languages
  - Official: Hindi
- Time zone: UTC+5:30 (IST)
- PIN: 247774
- Telephone code: 01398
- Vehicle registration: UP 19
- Sex ratio: 1000:850 unlocode = ♂/♀

Kandela is a village in Shamli district in the Indian state of Uttar Pradesh.

== Geography ==
It is located on the Shamli-Panipat highway. It is around 100 km from Delhi, 32 km from Panipat,72 from Meerut and 71 km from Saharanpur. The nearest towns are Shamli and Kairana nearest towns at a distance of 6 km each, connected by a 2 km long sub-road to the Shamli-Panipat highway. Kandela includes four patties (small independent villages), i.e. Kandela, Shekhupura, Hingokhedi and Jaganpur. They are under tahshils named Shamli and Kairana. They have independent local administrative bodies.

In this village all modern facilities are available such as banks, Girls Intermediate college, many government and private schools, co-operative society, veterinary hospital, mandi samiti, and even local radio frequency, RCC roads, water tank, 33/11 Kv Sub-Power station & Water supply system etc. In this village there is a higher education college for girls Ch. Man singh government girls college.

Kandela is located at 29.45°N 77.32°E. It has an average elevation of 248 metres (814 ft). Kandela is located near 220 Kv Sub-Station, which is the biggest Power Station of Shamli. There are four villages which are independently have their "PANCHAYATS".

== Politics ==
Local Body Elections conducted by State Government in October 2010 in 4 phase. It have 4 patti Kandela, Sakhapura, Hingokhari, Jaganpur where the Gurjars of Kalsiyan Khap live in majority as a single caste although Other castes as hole in majority but not single caste. many other cast live here as... kashyap, jogi, kumhar, bairagi (swami), harijan, valmiki, julahe, dhobi, bhaat, nai, sunar (goldsmith), badhai, jain, and also vaish/baniya/lala(JINDAL) The prominent leaders of Kalsiyan Khap are Ch.Hukum Singh Chauhan s/o Ch. Maan Singh Chauhan, Ex.Minister, U.P Govt., and MP Kairana.

== Demographics ==
The population of this village is approximately 25500 and sex ratio is about 850 It is one of the big villages of Western Uttar Pradesh, and biggest in shamli.

Population of Kairana tahshil 346000 (male 186823 female 159177) Total villages of this tahshil is 42 and Literacy rate 41.42%. Population of Shamli tahshil 493445 (male 266288 female 227157) and Literacy rate 53.24% according to census 2001.
