= National Highway 919 (India) =

National highway in India

National Highway 919
- Map of National Highway 919 in red

Route information
- Auxiliary route of NH 19
- Length: 74 km (46 mi)

Major junctions
- From: Palwal
- To: Rewari

Location
- Country: India
- States: Haryana
- Primary destinations: Sohna – Dharuhera

Highway system
- Roads in India; Expressways; National; State; Asian
← NH 19	→ NH 352

National Highway 919 (NH 919) is a National Highway in India. It connects Palwal and Rewari in Haryana via Dharuhera and Sohna, all of which are in Haryana.

It merges with NH 48 (Delhi-Jaipur highway) at Dharuhera, and again separates as NH 919 after 3 km at Masani Barrage at Sahibi River.

Its former number was NH 71B before all the national highways were renumbered in the year 2010.
