= National Highway 152 (India) =

National highway in India

National Highway 152
- Map of National Highway 152 in red
- Schematic map of National Highways in India

Route information
- Length: 155 km (96 mi)

Major junctions
- From: Narwana
- Kaithal
- To: Panchkula

Location
- Country: India

Highway system
- Roads in India; Expressways; National; State; Asian
← NH 52	→ NH 7

National Highway 152 (NH 152) is a National Highway in India.

== See also ==
- List of highways in Haryana
- Haryana Roadways
- Haryana Tourism
- National Highway Authority of India
- Railway in Haryana
