= Khanauri =

- Town
- Location in Punjab, India Khanauri (India)
- Coordinates: 29.83700°N 76.11045°E
- Country: India
- State: Punjab
- District: Sangrur

Population (2001)
  - Total: 10,960 area_magnitude= sq. km

Languages
  - Official: Punjabi Haryanvi/Bangru
- Time zone: UTC+5:30 (IST)
- PIN: 148027
- Telephone code: 01676
- Vehicle registration: PB13

Khanauri is a town and a nagar panchayat in Sangrur district in the state of Punjab, India. It is located at NH 52 at the border of Punjab and Haryana.

== Demographics ==
As of 2001, Khanauri had a population of 10,960. The population consisted of 5791 male and 5167 female inhabitants. In Khanauri, 16 percent of the whole population is below six years of age. The average literacy rate of Khanauri is 55 percent. 61 percent and 48 percent are the rates of male and female literacy respectively.

== Features ==
The town is near the Bhakhra and the Ghaggar rivers. There are many temples in the city: Shri Mahavir Mandir, Shri Naina Devi Mandir, Shri Hanuman Mandir, Shri Shani Dev Mandir, a temple of Lord Shiva, Shri Vishwakarma Mandir, Maharishi Balmik Mandir, Guru Ravidas Mandir, and also a Gurdwara Sahib. Khanauri has one police station.

Khanauri has one of the largest markets of second-hand spare parts and tools for vehicles in north India.
