= National Highway 907 (India) =

National highway in India

National Highway 907
- Map of National Highway 907 in red
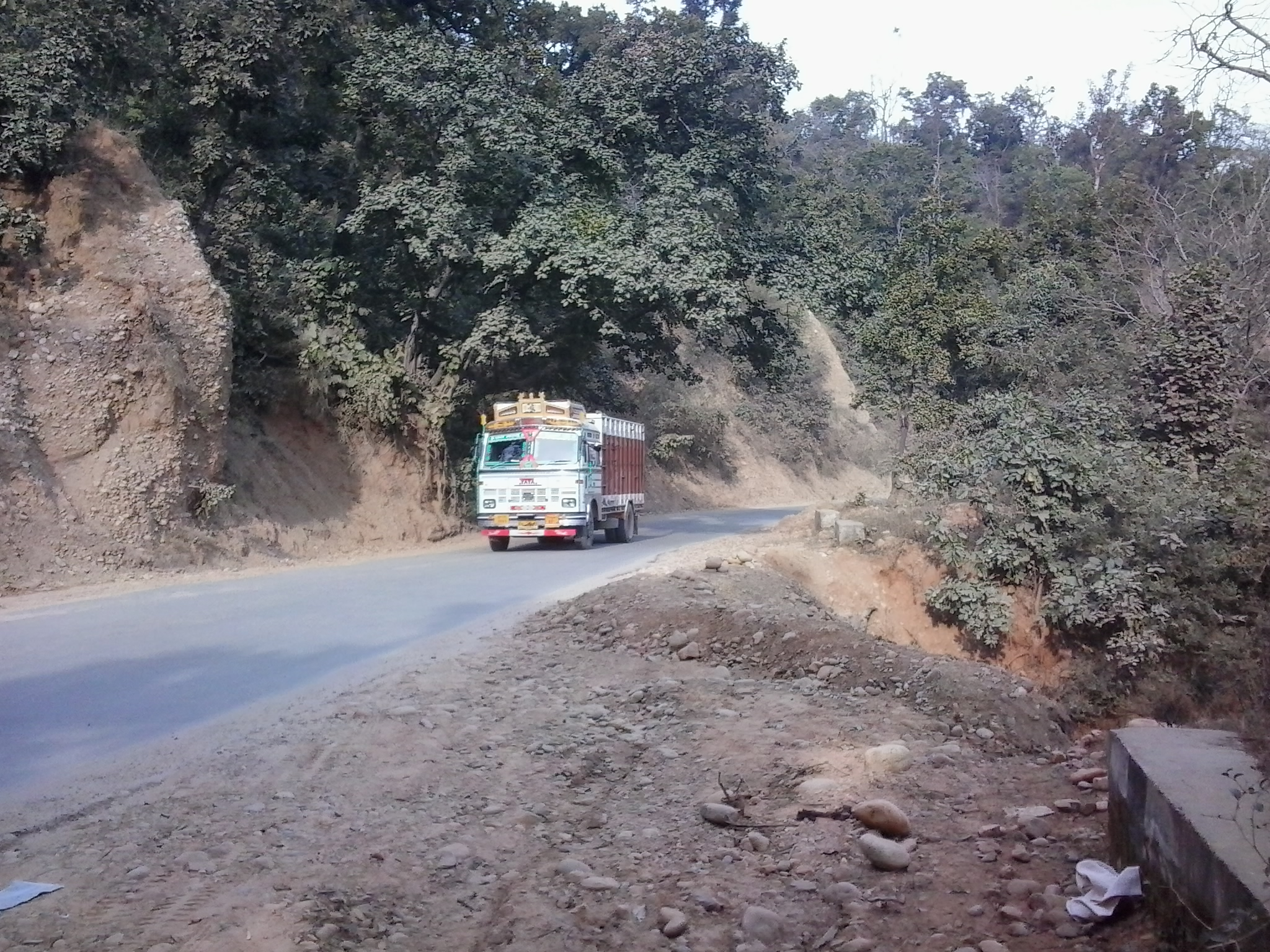
- NH 907 in hilly terrain

Route information
- Auxiliary route of NH 7
- Length: 57 km (35 mi)

Major junctions
- North end: Paonta Sahib, Himachal Pradesh
- South end: Yamuna Nagar, Haryana

Location
- Country: India
- States: Himachal Pradesh, Uttarakhand, Haryana

Highway system
- Roads in India; Expressways; National; State; Asian
← NH 7	→ NH 344

Schematic map of National Highways in India

National Highway 907 (NH 907) is an Indian National Highway starts from Paonta Sahib, Himachal Pradesh and ends at Yamuna Nagar, Haryana. The highway is 57 km (35 mi) long. Before renumbering of national highways of India, route of NH-907 was part of old national highway 73A.

== Route ==
NH907 links Paonta Sahib, Darpur, Ledi, Chhachhrauli, Jagadhri Chowk and Yamuna Nagar in the states of Haryana and Himachal Pradesh.

== Junctions ==
NH 7 Terminal near Paonta Sahib.
NH 344 Terminal near Yamuna Nagar.

== See also ==
- List of national highways in India
- List of national highways in India by state
- National Highways Development Project
