= Uchana =

- Town
- Location in Haryana, India Uchana (India)
- Coordinates: 29.47°N 76.17°E
- Country: India
- State: Haryana
- District: Jind
- Elevation: 215 m (705 ft)

Population (2011)
  - Total: 46,510

Languages
  - Official: Hindi, Haryanvi
- Time zone: UTC+5:30 (IST)
- PIN: 126115
- ISO 3166 code: IN-HR
- Vehicle registration: HR 90
- Website: haryana.gov.in

Uchana is a developing town and a municipal committee, near city of Jind in Jind district in the Indian state of Haryana.

== Education ==
Uchana has many government and private schools up to senior secondary level (both English and Hindi medium) and four colleges. Ch. Birender Singh, former cabinet Minister in Government of India founded a college named Rajiv Gandhi Mahavidyalaya affiliated to Kurukshetra University and a Nursing college at the outskirts of town (on NH 352, near village Baroda).

== Schools ==
- Govt. Sr. Sec. School, Near Railway Fatak, Uchana
- Govt. Girls Sr. Sec. School, Uchana Mandi
- SD Public School, Railway Road, Near old Bus stand, Uchana
- SSMSD Sr. Sec. School a.k.a. Baba Wala School, Uchana Kalan
- Geeta Vidya Mandir High School, Uchana Mandi
- Shivaniaa Public School, Uchana

== Colleges ==
- SD Girls College Uchana
- Shri Ganeshanand College
- Rajiv Gandhi Mahavidlaya

== Demographics ==
According to the 2001 census, Uchana had a population of 14,100. Males constitute 54% of the population and females 46%. Uchana has an average literacy rate of 78%, higher than the national average of 74.04%. Male literacy is 82%, and female literacy is 74%. In Uchana, 15% of the population is under 6 years of age.

== Politics ==
Uchana (Vidhan Sabha constituency) is always a hot seat in Haryana constituency elections. Premlata (Wife Of Ch. Birender Singh, Union Minister in Modi Cabinet) was elected as MLA (candidate of BJP.) in 2014 while the current MLA is Dushyant Chautala (former deputy chief minister of haryana state) after a massive win in 2019 elections. In the general election Uchana comes under Hisar (Lok Sabha constituency) and Brijendra Singh is MP.

== Railways and Roadways ==
Uchana (UCA) has a railway station on Delhi-Jind-Narwana-Jakhal section of Delhi-Fazilka line that connects Delhi to Punjab. From Uchana, passengers can get direct trains to Jind, Narwana, Delhi, New Delhi, Mumbai, Katra, Jammu, Chandigarh, Jaipur, Kaithal, Kurukshetra, Rohtak, Panipat, Hisar, Sirsa, Jakhal, Firozpur and many other cities.

It is well connected by the road services as well. Privately owned buses and other vehicles run for short routes like Uchana to Jind, Narwana, , Hansi, Hisar, Gogharia, Karsindhu etc. Long route direct buses are also available for Delhi, Sangrur, Ludhiana, Amritsar, Patiala, Jammu etc. It is situated on the busy route of Delhi to Sangrur on National Highway 71.

Nearest airport is IGI Airport, New Delhi - 165 km distance (about 3.5 hours ride).
