= National Highway 44 (India) =

National highway in India, running from Srinagar to Kanyakumari

National Highway 44
- Map of National Highway 44 in red
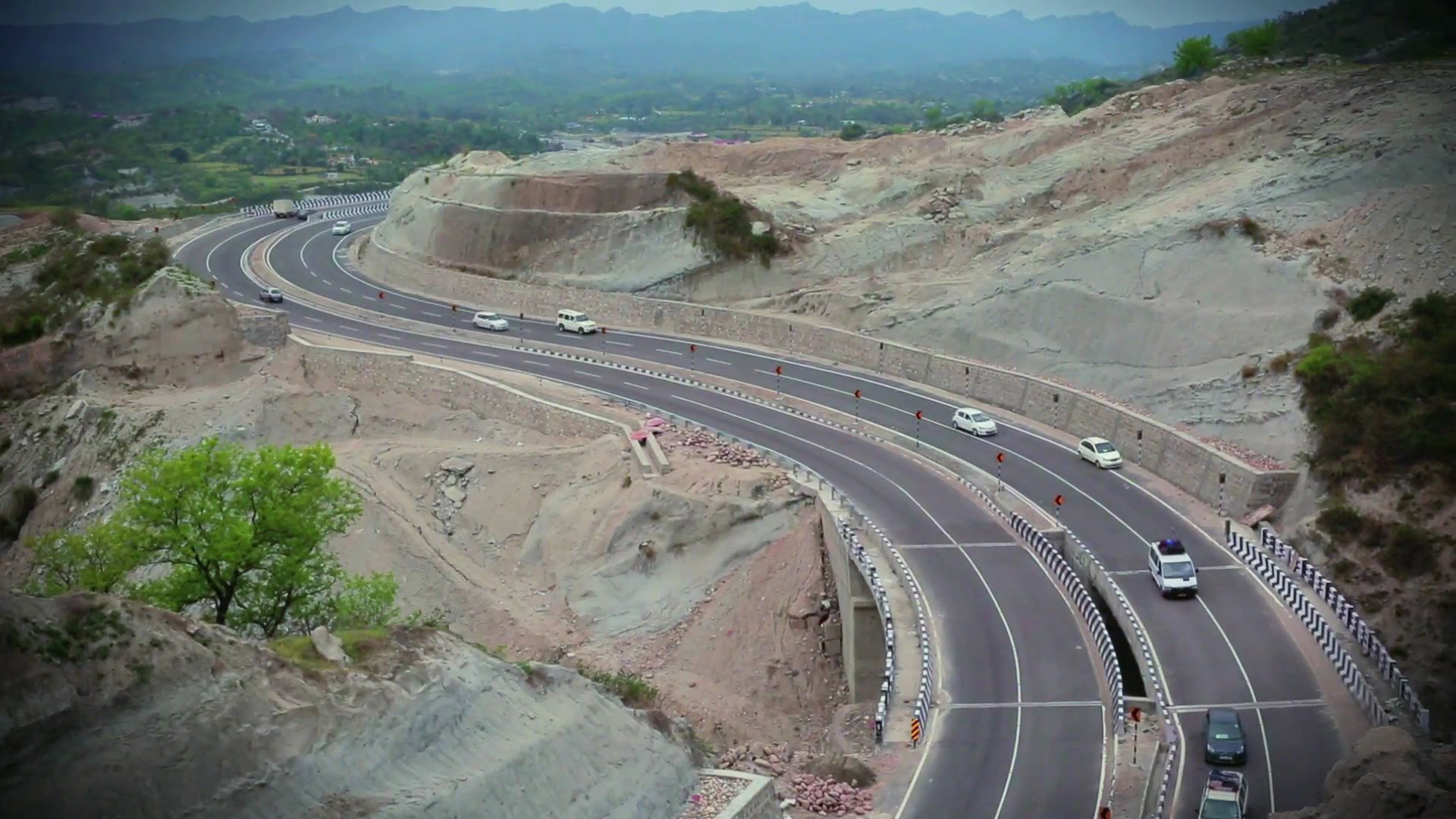
- Entrance of National Highway 44 in Jammu and Kashmir.

Route information
- Part of AH1 AH2 AH43
- Length: 4,113 km (2,556 mi) GQ: 94 km (58 mi) (Bengaluru – Krishnagiri); NS: 1,828 km (Lakhnadon – Kanyakumari)

Major junctions
- North end: NH 1 in Srinagar, Jammu and Kashmir
- List: NH 3 in Jalandhar; NH 5 in Ludhiana; NH 7 in Rajpura; NE 2 in Kundli; NH 9 / NH 19 / NH 48 / NE 3 in New Delhi; NE 2 in Palwal; NH 21 in Agra; NH 23 in Dholpur; NH 27 / NH 39 in Jhansi; NH 34 in Lakhnadon; NH 53 in Nagpur; NH 61 in Nirmal; NH 63 in Nizamabad; NH 65 in Hyderabad; NH 40 in Kurnool; NH 67 in Gooty; NH 42 in Anantpur; NH 69 in Chikkaballapur; NH 48 in Bangalore; NH 77 in Krishnagiri; NH 79 in Salem; NH 81 in Karur; NH 83 in Dindigul; NH 85 in Madurai; NH 66 in Kanyakumari
- South end: Kanyakumari, Tamil Nadu

Location
- Country: India
- States: Jammu and Kashmir: 304 km (189 mi); Himachal Pradesh: 11 km (6.8 mi); Punjab: 279 km (173 mi); Haryana: 257 km (160 mi); Uttar Pradesh: 287 km (178 mi); Madhya Pradesh: 547 km (340 mi); Maharashtra: 260 km (160 mi); Telangana: 533 km (331 mi); Andhra Pradesh: 260 km (160 mi); Karnataka: 135 km (84 mi); Tamil Nadu: 630 km (390 mi)

Highway system
- Roads in India; Expressways; National; State; Asian
← NH 43	→ NH 45

National Highway 44 (NH 44) is a major north–south National Highway in India and is the longest in the country.

It passes through the Union Territory of Jammu and Kashmir, in addition to the states of Punjab, Haryana, Delhi, Uttar Pradesh, Rajasthan, Madhya Pradesh, Maharashtra, Telangana, Andhra Pradesh, Karnataka, and Tamil Nadu.

It came into being by merging seven national highways, in full or part, starting with the Jammu–Srinagar National Highway (former NH 1A) from Srinagar in Jammu and Kashmir, former NH 1 in Punjab and Haryana ending at Delhi, part of former NH 2 starting from Delhi and ending at Agra, former NH 3 (popularly known as Agra-Bombay National Highway) from Agra to Gwalior, former NH 75 and former NH 26 to Jhansi, and former NH 7 via Lakhnadon, Seoni, Nagpur, Adilabad, Nirmal, Hyderabad, Kurnool, Anantapur,Chikkaballapur, Devanahalli, Bangalore, Hosur, Krishnagiri, Dharmapuri, Salem, Namakkal, Karur, Dindigul, Madurai, Virudhunagar, Kovilpatti and Tirunelveli terminating at Kanyakumari.

The 70 km Delhi-to-Panipat section, also known as Delhi–Panipat Expressway, is being upgraded, at a cost of ₹2,178.82 crores, to an elevated tolled expressway with 8 (4+4) main lanes and 4 (2+2) service lanes, which was completed in July 2023. The NH-44 road between Salem and Thoppur in Tamil Nadu is prone to fatal accidents due to the hilly slopes. Agra-Gwalior section of this highway is part of the legendary AB Road(Agra-Bombay Road).

== Route ==
The highway starts from Srinagar at a junction with NH 1. NH 44 covers the North-South Corridor of NHDP and it is officially listed as running over 4,112 km (2,555 mi) from Srinagar to Kanyakumari. It is the longest national highway in India.

Route length in states and UTs
States/UTs	Total length in State/UT	Junctions	Destinations	Other Cities Covered
Jammu and Kashmir	541 km (336 mi)	5	NH 1 in Srinagar	Srinagar (The Starting point)
Jammu and Kashmir	541 km (336 mi)	5	NH 501 in Anantnag	Srinagar (The Starting point)
Jammu and Kashmir	541 km (336 mi)	5	NH 244 in Anantnag	Srinagar (The Starting point)
Jammu and Kashmir	541 km (336 mi)	5	NH 144 in Domel	Srinagar (The Starting point)
Jammu and Kashmir	541 km (336 mi)	5	NH 144A in Jammu	Srinagar (The Starting point)
Himachal Pradesh	11.08 km (6.88 mi)	0		The route runs parallel to Chakki River.
Punjab	279.42 km (173.62 mi)	4	NH 54 in Pathankot	Mukerian
Punjab	279.42 km (173.62 mi)	4	NH 3 in Jalandhar	Mukerian
Punjab	279.42 km (173.62 mi)	4	NH 5 in Ludhiana	Mukerian
Punjab	279.42 km (173.62 mi)	4	NH 7 in Rajpura	Mukerian
Haryana	257.80 km (160.19 mi)	7	NH 344 in Ambala	Kurukshetra, Faridabad
Haryana	257.80 km (160.19 mi)	7	NH 152 in Ambala	Kurukshetra, Faridabad
Haryana	257.80 km (160.19 mi)	7	NH 709A in Karnal	Kurukshetra, Faridabad
Haryana	257.80 km (160.19 mi)	7	NH 709 in Panipat	Kurukshetra, Faridabad
Haryana	257.80 km (160.19 mi)	7	NH 334B in Sonipat	Kurukshetra, Faridabad
Haryana	257.80 km (160.19 mi)	7	NE 2 in Kundli and in Dholagarh	Kurukshetra, Faridabad
Haryana	257.80 km (160.19 mi)	7	NH 919 in Palwal	Kurukshetra, Faridabad
Delhi	15 km (9.3 mi)	4	NH 9 in New Delhi	
Delhi	15 km (9.3 mi)	4	NE 3 in New Delhi	
Delhi	15 km (9.3 mi)	4	NH 19 in New Delhi	
Delhi	15 km (9.3 mi)	4	NH 48 in New Delhi	
Uttar Pradesh	269.10 km (167.21 mi)	3	NH 21 in Agra	Vrindavan, Mathura, Lalitpur, Kosi Kalan
Uttar Pradesh	269.10 km (167.21 mi)	3	NH 27 in Jhansi	Vrindavan, Mathura, Lalitpur, Kosi Kalan
Uttar Pradesh	269.10 km (167.21 mi)	3	NH 39 in Jhansi	Vrindavan, Mathura, Lalitpur, Kosi Kalan
Rajasthan	28.29 km (17.58 mi)	1	NH 23 in Dholpur	
Madhya Pradesh	571.9 km (355.4 mi)	1	NH 347 in Seoni	Gwalior, Sagar, Narsinghpur, Lakhnadon, Seoni
Maharashtra	268.36 km (166.75 mi)	11	NH 753 in Mansar	Nagpur, Hinganghat, Pandharkawda
Maharashtra	268.36 km (166.75 mi)	11	NH 753 in Amdi	Nagpur, Hinganghat, Pandharkawda
Maharashtra	268.36 km (166.75 mi)	11	NH 247 in Kamptee	Nagpur, Hinganghat, Pandharkawda
Maharashtra	268.36 km (166.75 mi)	11	NH 53 in Nagpur	Nagpur, Hinganghat, Pandharkawda
Maharashtra	268.36 km (166.75 mi)	11	NH 353D in Nagpur	Nagpur, Hinganghat, Pandharkawda
Maharashtra	268.36 km (166.75 mi)	11	NH 353I in Jamtha	Nagpur, Hinganghat, Pandharkawda
Maharashtra	268.36 km (166.75 mi)	11	NH 361 in Butibori	Nagpur, Hinganghat, Pandharkawda
Maharashtra	268.36 km (166.75 mi)	11	NH 347A in Jamb	Nagpur, Hinganghat, Pandharkawda
Maharashtra	268.36 km (166.75 mi)	11	NH 347A in Hinganghat	Nagpur, Hinganghat, Pandharkawda
Maharashtra	268.36 km (166.75 mi)	11	NH 361B in Wadki	Nagpur, Hinganghat, Pandharkawda
Maharashtra	268.36 km (166.75 mi)	11	NH 930 in Karanji	Nagpur, Hinganghat, Pandharkawda
Telangana	492.85 km (306.24 mi)	5	NH 61 in Nirmal	Adilabad, Kamareddy, Jadcherla, Mahbubnagar
Telangana	492.85 km (306.24 mi)	5	NH 63 in Nizamabad	Adilabad, Kamareddy, Jadcherla, Mahbubnagar
Telangana	492.85 km (306.24 mi)	5	NH 65 in Hyderabad	Adilabad, Kamareddy, Jadcherla, Mahbubnagar
Telangana	492.85 km (306.24 mi)	5	NH 163 in Hyderabad	Adilabad, Kamareddy, Jadcherla, Mahbubnagar
Telangana	492.85 km (306.24 mi)	5	NH 765 in Hyderabad	Adilabad, Kamareddy, Jadcherla, Mahbubnagar
Andhra Pradesh	260.99 km (162.17 mi)	4	NH 40 in Kurnool	Kurnool,Anantpur
Andhra Pradesh	260.99 km (162.17 mi)	4	NH 340C in Dhone	Kurnool,Anantpur
Andhra Pradesh	260.99 km (162.17 mi)	4	NH 67 in Gooty	Kurnool,Anantpur
Andhra Pradesh	260.99 km (162.17 mi)	4	NH 42 in Anantpur	Kurnool,Anantpur
Karnataka	95.67 km (59.45 mi)	5	NH 69 in Chikkaballapur	Chikkaballapur
Karnataka	95.67 km (59.45 mi)	5	NH 48 in Bangalore	Chikkaballapur
Karnataka	95.67 km (59.45 mi)	5	NH 209 in Bangalore	Chikkaballapur
Karnataka	95.67 km (59.45 mi)	5	NH 75 in Bangalore	Chikkaballapur
Karnataka	95.67 km (59.45 mi)	5	NH 275 in Bangalore	Chikkaballapur
Tamil Nadu	627.18 km (389.71 mi)	14	NH 648 in Hosur	Virudhunagar, Namakkal
Tamil Nadu	627.18 km (389.71 mi)	14	NH 77 in Krishnagiri	Virudhunagar, Namakkal
Tamil Nadu	627.18 km (389.71 mi)	14	NH 844 in Dharmapuri	Virudhunagar, Namakkal
Tamil Nadu	627.18 km (389.71 mi)	14	NH 79 in Salem	Virudhunagar, Namakkal
Tamil Nadu	627.18 km (389.71 mi)	14	NH 544 in Salem	Virudhunagar, Namakkal
Tamil Nadu	627.18 km (389.71 mi)	14	NH 81 in Karur	Virudhunagar, Namakkal
Tamil Nadu	627.18 km (389.71 mi)	14	NH 83 in Dindigul	Virudhunagar, Namakkal
Tamil Nadu	627.18 km (389.71 mi)	14	NH 183 in Dindigul	Virudhunagar, Namakkal
Tamil Nadu	627.18 km (389.71 mi)	14	NH 85 in Madurai	Virudhunagar, Namakkal
Tamil Nadu	627.18 km (389.71 mi)	14	NH 744 in Thirumangalam	Virudhunagar, Namakkal
Tamil Nadu	627.18 km (389.71 mi)	14	NH 138 in Tirunelveli	Virudhunagar, Namakkal
Tamil Nadu	627.18 km (389.71 mi)	14	NH 944 near Nagercoil	Virudhunagar, Namakkal
Tamil Nadu	627.18 km (389.71 mi)	14	NH 66 in Kanyakumari	Virudhunagar, Namakkal

=== Bengaluru–Hosur Road ===
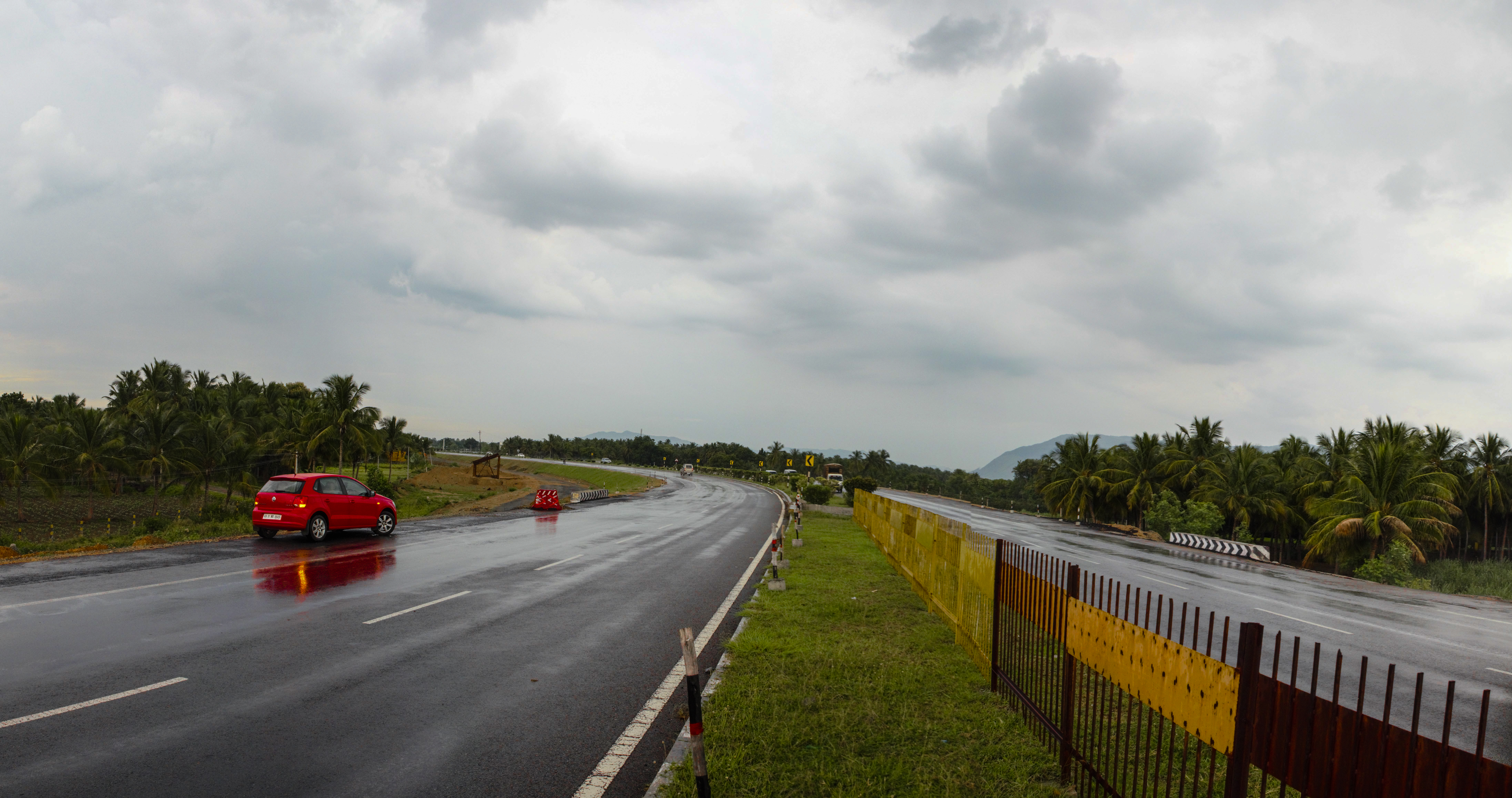
National Highway 44 near Bengaluru

16km long elevated stretch of NH 44 through Pench Tiger Reserve in Madhya Pradesh

Bengaluru–Hosur Road of this highway connects Bengaluru, the capital of the state of Karnataka, and the city of Hosur, in the Krishnagiri district on the border of Karnataka and Tamil Nadu. It is a four- to six-lane highway which also has service lanes on either sides at the busier parts. Apart from being a part of the National Highway, the road is also significant because it consist of many industrial and IT business houses. The IT industrial park Electronic City is also located alongside Hosur Road.

The National Highways Authority of India has constructed a 10-kilometre-long (6.2 mi) elevated highway between Bommanahalli and Electronic City. This toll road has made travel to Electronic City a lot faster. The Bruhat Bengaluru Mahanagara Palike and the Bengaluru Development Authority have planned a series of flyovers and underpasses to make this arterial road signal-free.

== Expansion ==
- On 11 March 2024, Prime Minister Narendra Modi laid the foundation stone for five projects in the state, including the work to improve the Thoppur Pass on the Dharmapuri - Salem section of National Highway-44.The work is to be undertaken at a cost of Rs 905 crore, and a 4 km long elevated highway is being constructed on the existing road, which will facilitate safe travel in the accident-prone Thoppur Ghat section.

== Tunnels ==
- T5 Tunnel: On 16 March 2023, the National Highways Authority of India Thursday opened for traffic T5 tunnel, a 870-metre tunnel that bypasses landslide-prone stretch of the mountainous road between Panthial and Magerkote, on the Jammu-Srinagar National Highway in Ramban district.

== Primary destinations ==
- Srinagar – Udhampur - Jammu – Kathua (Jammu and Kashmir)
– Pathankot - Mukerian – Jalandhar – Ludhiana (Punjab)
– Ambala – Kurukshetra – Panipat – Sonipat (Haryana)
– Delhi (Delhi)
– Faridabad – Palwal (Haryana)
– Mathura – Agra (UP)
– Dholpur (Rajasthan)

- Morena - Gwalior (MP)
– Jhansi – Lalitpur (UP)
– Sagar – Narsinghpur – Lakhnadon – Seoni (MP)
– Nagpur – Hinganghat (Maharashtra)
– Adilabad – Nirmal – Nizamabad- Kamareddy – Hyderabad – Jadcherla (Telangana)
– Kurnool – Dhone – Anantapur (AP)
– Chikkaballapur – Devanahalli – Bangalore – Hebbagodi – Attibele (Karnataka)
– Hosur – Krishnagiri – Dharmapuri – Salem – Karur – Dindigul – Madurai – Tirunelveli – Kanyakumari (Tamil Nadu)

== Notes ==
- A major stretch of NH 44 from Lakhnadon to Kanyakumari (1,910 km (1,190 mi)) has been selected as a part of the North-South Corridor by the National Highways Development Project.
- Approximately 82 km (51 mi) stretch of NH 44 between Bengaluru and Krishnagiri has been selected as a part of the Golden Quadrilateral also by the National Highways Development Project.

== See also ==
- List of national highways in India
- National Highways Development Project
- NH 138
