= National Highway 9 (India) =

National highway in India

National Highway 9
- Map of National Highway 9 in red
- Schematic map of National Highways in India

Route information
- Part of AH2
- Length: 954 km (593 mi)

Major junctions
- east end: Gori Ganga Bridge at Askot in Pithoragarh(Kumaun) District, Uttarakhand
- List: NH 7 in Fazilka; NH 7 in Malout; NH 354E in Dabwali; NH 54 in Dabwali; NH 52 in Hisar; NH 709 in Rohtak; NH 352 in Rohtak; NH 334b in Sampla; NH 44 in Delhi; NH 34 in Ghaziabad; NH 334 in Hapur; NH 509 in Moradabad; NH 530 in Rampur; NH 109 in Rudrapur; NH 309 in Rudrapur; NH 30 in Sitarganj; NH 309A in Rameshwar; NH 309B in Rameshwar; NH 109K in Jauljibi
- west end: Fazilka, Punjab

Location
- Country: India
- States: Punjab, Haryana, Delhi, Uttar Pradesh, Uttarakhand,
- Primary destinations: Fazilka, Malout (Punjab); Sirsa-Hisar-Rohtak (Haryana); Delhi; Ghaziabad-Moradabad-Rampur (Uttar Pradesh); Rudrapur-Sitarganj-Tanakpur-Pithoragarh (Uttarakhand), Gori Ganga Bridge Askot(Kailash Mansarovar Road).

Highway system
- Roads in India; Expressways; National; State; Asian
← NH 8	→ NH 10

National Highway 9 (NH 9) is a National Highway in India in east-west direction. It starts at Fazilka in Punjab and ends at Gori Ganga Bridge at Askot in Pithoragarh (Kumaun) District of Uttarakhand in Pithoragarh district in Uttarakhand. It passes through the states of Punjab, Haryana, Delhi, Uttar Pradesh and Uttarakhand. After renumbering of all national highways by National Highway Authority of India in 2010, the current NH 9 was formed by merging segments of five separate national highways in 2010; these were Old NH 10 (Fazilka-Delhi section), Old NH 24 (Delhi-Rampur section), Old NH 87 (Rampur-Rudrapur section), Old NH 74 (Rudrapur-Sitarganj-Khatima section) and Old NH 125 (Tanakpur-Pithoragarh section).

== Route ==
Starting at Fazilka in Punjab and ending at Gori Ganga Bridge Askot in the State of Uttarakhand, it passes connects several important cities in five states in North India (from west towards east): The highway runs 954 kilometres (593 mi) end to end and is also known as Kailash Mansarovar Road in Uttarakhand.

- Punjab
  - Fazilka
  - Malout
- Haryana
  - Sirsa-Fatehabad-Hisar-Hansi-Maham-Bhiwani-Rohtak-Bahadurgarh
- Delhi
- Uttar Pradesh
  - Ghaziabad-Hapur-Moradabad-Rampur
- Uttarakhand
  - Rudrapur-Kichha-Sitarganj-Khatima-Tanakpur-Dhaun-Pithoragarh-Ogla-Askot

== Map with spur routes ==
Map of NH9 in red, spur routes in blue

== See also ==
- List of national highways in India
- List of national highways in India by state

== Gallery ==
NH 9 at Malout (Punjab)

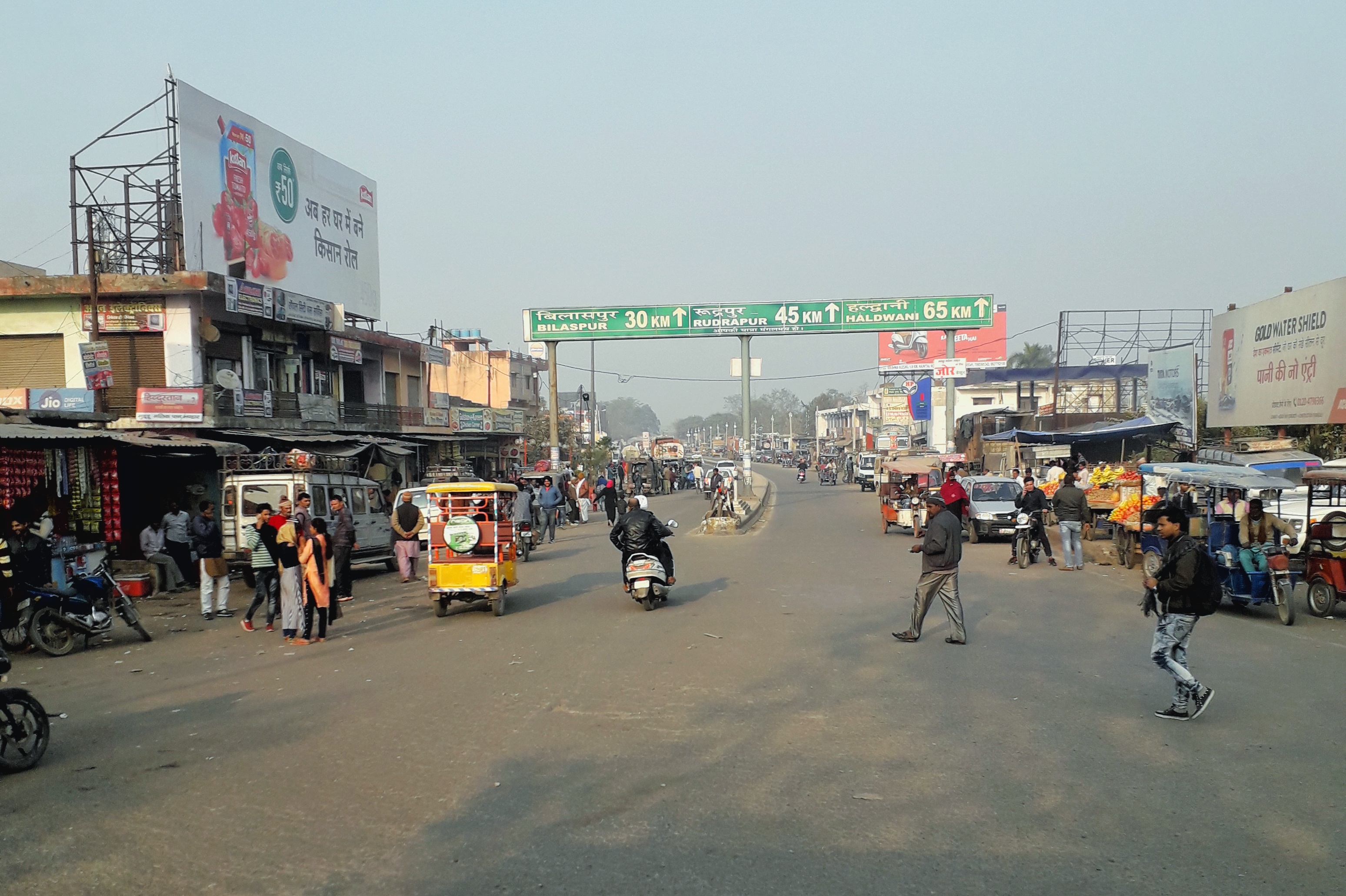
NH 9 (formerly NH 87) at Rampur (UP)

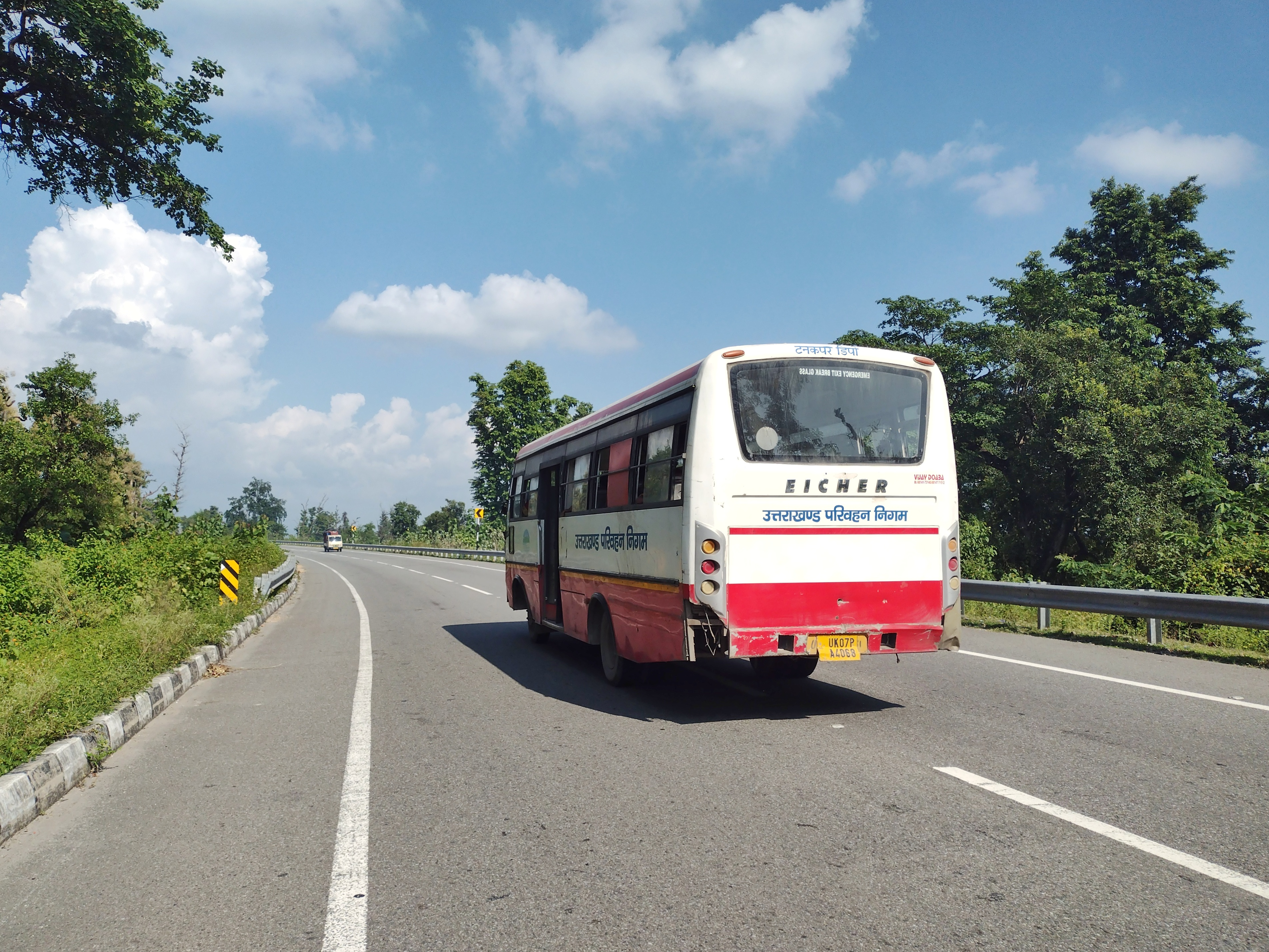
NH 9 near Khatima(near SITARGANJ) (Uttarakhand)
