= National Highway 709 (India) =

National highway in India

National Highway 709
- Map of National Highway 709 in red

Route information
- Length: 243 km (151 mi)

Major junctions
- From: Panipat
- To: Rajgarh

Location
- Country: India
- States: Haryana, Rajasthan
- Primary destinations: Rohtak, Bhiwani, Pilani

Highway system
- Roads in India; Expressways; National; State; Asian
← NH 44	→ NH 52

National Highway 709 (NH 709 Ext) starts from Rajgarh and ends at Panipat, Rajgarh is in the state of Rajasthan. Rohtak, Bhiwani and Pilani are the major towns in between on this highway route. This highways meets with National Highway 1(Delhi to Amritsar) at Panipat Bypass. The highway is 243 km (151 mi) long and runs only in the state of Haryana and Rajasthan.Highway is four Lane between Panipat and Bhiwani. Four Lanning between Kalanaur and Bhiwani has completed. Toll Gates are being Constructed near Bhiwani.

== Route ==
The route of National Highway 709 passes through the following towns and villages:-

Rajgarh
Pilani
Loharu
Bhiwani
Kalanaur
Lahli
Rohtak
Bahmanwas
Jassia
Ghilaur
Rukhi
Bhainswan Khurd
Mahra
Gohana
Mundlana
Chirana
Israna
Naultha
Dohar
Mehrana
Panipat

== See also ==
- List of national highways in India
- National Highways Development Project
