= National Highway 352 (India) =

National highway in India

National Highway 352
- Map of National Highway 352 in red

Route information
- Length: 187 km (116 mi)

Major junctions
- From: Narwana
- To: NH 48 (Delhi-Jaipur)

Location
- Country: India
- Primary destinations: Jind – Rohtak – Jhajjar – Rewari

Highway system
- Roads in India; Expressways; National; State; Asian
← NH 52	→ NH 48

National Highway 352 (NH 352) is a National Highway in India.

It connects Narwana in Haryana to Jind, Rohtak, Jhajjar and Rewari, all of them in Haryana. Its southern end terminates on NH 48 (Delhi-Jaipur highway) near Sangwari village between Dharuhera and Bawal bypassing Rewari city. Its northern end terminates on NH 52 at Narwana.

Its former number was NH 71 before all the national highways were renumbered in the year 2010.
