= National Highway 52 (India) =

National highway in India

National Highway 52
- National Highway 52 in Red on India map
- Schematic map of National Highways in India

Route information
- Part of AH47
- Length: 2,317 km (1,440 mi)

Major junctions
- From: NH 7 in Sangrur, Punjab
- List: NH 9 in Hisar, Haryana; NH 11 / NH 58 in Fatehpur, Rajasthan; NH 48 in Jaipur, Rajasthan; NH 23 in Kothoon, Rajasthan; NH 27 in Kota, Rajasthan; NE 4 in Darrah WLS, Rajasthan; NH 46 in Biaora, Madhya Pradesh; NH 53 / NH 60 in Dhule, Maharashtra; NH 61 in Gadhi, Maharashtra; NH 63 in Yedshi, Maharashtra; NH 65 in Solapur, Maharashtra; NH 50 in Vijayapura, Karnataka; NH 67 / NH 48 in Hubbali, Karnataka
- To: NH 66 in Ankola, Karnataka

Location
- Country: India
- States: Punjab - Haryana - Rajasthan - Madhya Pradesh - Maharashtra - Karnataka

Highway system
- Roads in India; Expressways; National; State; Asian
← NH 51	→ NH 53

National Highway 52 (NH 52), is the fourth longest National Highway in India. It connects Sangrur, Punjab to Ankola, Karnataka. The national highway 52 was numbered after amalgamating many existing national highways of India. The old highway numbered NH63 went from Ankola in Karnataka state to Gooty in Andhra Pradesh . NH 52 starts at the junction of National Highway 66 (old number NH 17) at Ankola and moves up to Arebail ghat of Western Ghats and then to Yellapura and further to Hubballi (Hubli) city. Some stretch of old National Highway 13 from Vijayapura ( old name Bijapur) to Solapur was joined with NH 52. Lorries coming from Hubballi city to Karwar sea port and New Mangalore sea port (NMPT) use this highway. The stretch of road from Ankola to Yellapura is through the forests of the Western ghats of India. Biaora - Dhule section of this highway is part of the Legendary Agra-Bombay Road, also known as AB Road.

== Major cities ==
=== Punjab ===
- Sangrur, Dirba, Pattran

=== Haryana ===
- Narwana, Barwala, Uklana Mandi, Hisar, Siwani

=== Rajasthan ===
- Sadulpur/Rajgarh, Churu, Ramgarh, Fatehpur, Laxmangarh, Sikar, Palsana, Ringas, Chomu, Jaipur, Tonk, Bundi, Kota, Jhalawar, Aklera

=== Madhya Pradesh ===
- Shivpuri, Guna, Rajgarh, Biora, Dewas, Indore, Sendhwa

=== Maharashtra ===
- Dhule, Chalisgaon, Kannad, Aurangabad, Georai, Beed, Chausala, Dharashiv, Tulajapur, Solapur

=== Karnataka ===
- Dhulakhed, Zalki, Horti, Agasanal, Bijapur, Kolhar, Bilagi, Bagalkote, Kerur, Nargund, Navalgund, Hubli, Kalaghatagi, Yellapura, Ramanaguli, Ankola

== See also ==
- National Highway 66 (India)
- National Highway 75 (India)
- National Highway 73 (India)
- National Highway 169 (India)
- National Highway 275 (India)
- Ghat Roads
