= Chak Vendhal =

- village
- Location in Punjab, India Chak Vendhal (India)
- Coordinates: 31.198431°N 75.5438912°E
- Country: India
- State: Punjab
- District: Jalandhar

Population (2001)
  - Total: 1,281

Languages
  - Official: Punjabi
- Time zone: UTC+5:30 (IST)
- Vehicle registration: PB-
- Coastline: 0 kilometres (0 mi)

Chak Vendhal is a village in Tehsil Nakodar, Jalandhar district, in Punjab, India.

== Demographics ==
According to the 2001 Census, Chak Vendhal has a population of 1,281 people. Neighboring villages include Bajuha Khurd, Chanian, Gura, Chak Khurd, Khun khun and Kang Sahbu.

== History ==
According to local tradition, the ancestors of the Bagri families originate from the Bagar area of Rajasthan. People of the village of Chak Kallan also narrate this legend.

== Baba Buddha Shah Ji ==
Chak Vendhal is locally known for the shrine Baba Buddha Shah Ji.

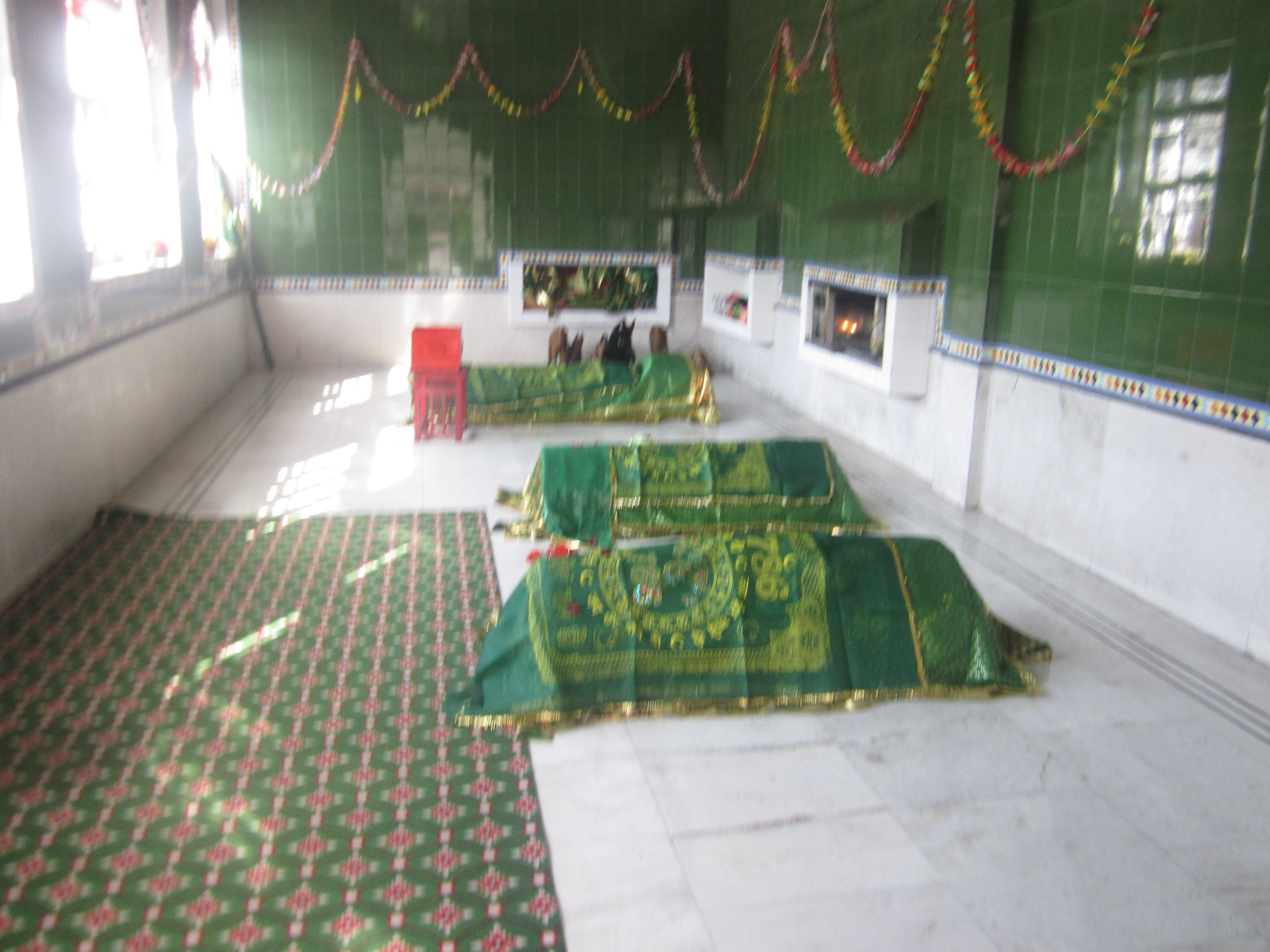
Shrine Baba Budda Ji

== Dera Chishtian (Gaddi Baba Sheikh Farid Ji) ==
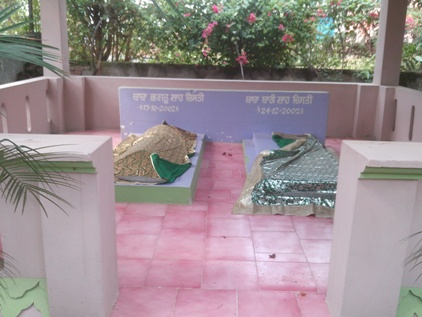
Tombs of Sufi Saints at Chak Vendhal

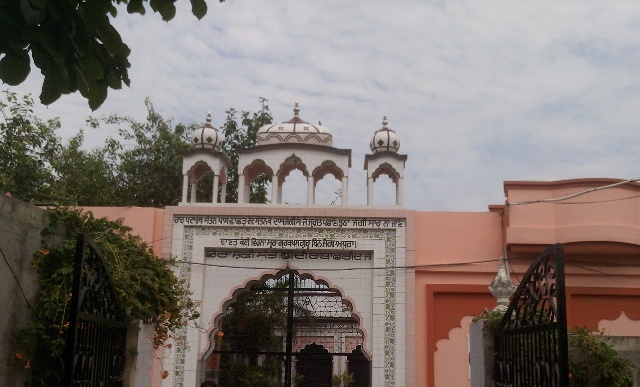
Temple of Sufi Saint Baba Farid Ji at Chak Vendhal

Maa Gurbaksh Kaur, the first woman Sufi Saint of Punjab was baptised in 1975 by a famous saint of the Chisti order Baba Madho Shah of Adampur Punjab. In 1986, Maa Gurbaksh Kaur founded the Dera Chishtian (Gaddi Baba Sheikh Farid Ji) in Chak Vendhal.

== Education ==
Chak Vendhal has a government primary school and some shops.

== Transportation ==
The nearest road is the Jallandhar-Nakodar Road(N.H. 71) which can be reached via Khunkhani and Kang Sahbu. There are other roads to nearest villages like Chak Kalan and Shankar.
