= Delhi–Amritsar–Katra Expressway =

Indian expressway connecting Delhi with Katra in J&K

Delhi–Amritsar–Katra Expressway
- Map of Delhi–Gurdaspur section of the expressway in red

Route information
- Maintained by National Highways Authority of India (NHAI)
- Length: 670 km (420 mi)
- Status: To be fully functional in 2026

Major junctions
- South end: WPE in Nilauthi village, Haryana (future extension to UER-II planned)
- List: NH 344B in Hassangarh, Haryana; NH 709 in Puthi, Haryana; NH 352A in Ishapur Kheri, Haryana; NH 152D in Bania Khera, Haryana; NH 709A in Alewa, Haryana; NH 152 in Kharak Pandwa, Haryana; NH 152A in Gulzarpura Tharwa, Punjab
- North end: 1. Sri Guru Ram Das Ji International Airport, Amritsar, Punjab; 2. Katra, Jammu and Kashmir

Location
- Country: India
- States: Haryana, Punjab, Jammu & Kashmir

Highway system
- Roads in India; Expressways; National; State; Asian

Delhi–Amritsar–Katra Expressway is an under-construction 670 km (420 mi) long, 4-lane (expandable to 8 lanes) wide controlled-access expressway, which will connect Bahadurgarh border near Delhi with Katra in Jammu and Kashmir via Haryana and Punjab. It will have a spur section which will connect Nakodar with Sri Guru Ram Das Ji International Airport located in Raja Sansi, Amritsar. The 397.7 km (247.1 mi) long Delhi–Katra Expressway is National Expressway 5 (NE-5) and 99 km (62 mi) long Nakodar-Amritsar Expressway is National Expressway 5A (NE-5A). Once completed, it will reduce the current Delhi-Katra distance from 727 km (452 mi) to 588 km (365 mi) and the time travel will be reduced from 14 hours to 6 hours, and Delhi-Amritsar distance to 405 km (252 mi) and from the time travel will be reduced from 8 hours to only 4 hours.

It will have a trauma centre, ambulances, fire brigades, traffic police, bus bays, truck stops, interchanges with refreshment, and recreational facilities. To be constructed as a part of the Bharatmala Pariyojana, it is expected to cost ₹40,000 crores. Detailed Project Report (DPR) was completed in November 2019, and land acquisition commenced from January 2020. M/S Feedback Infra Pvt Ltd. was appointed as DPR consultant to carry out alignment studies which submitted the final shortest proposed alignment report of Delhi–Nakodar–Gurdaspur section in September 2019, Nakodar–Amritsar section in June 2020, and the survey is currently under progress in Jammu section. It is part of Ludhiana-Delhi-Kolkata Industrial Corridor. There are 11 National industrial corridors and numerous state level industrial corridors in India.

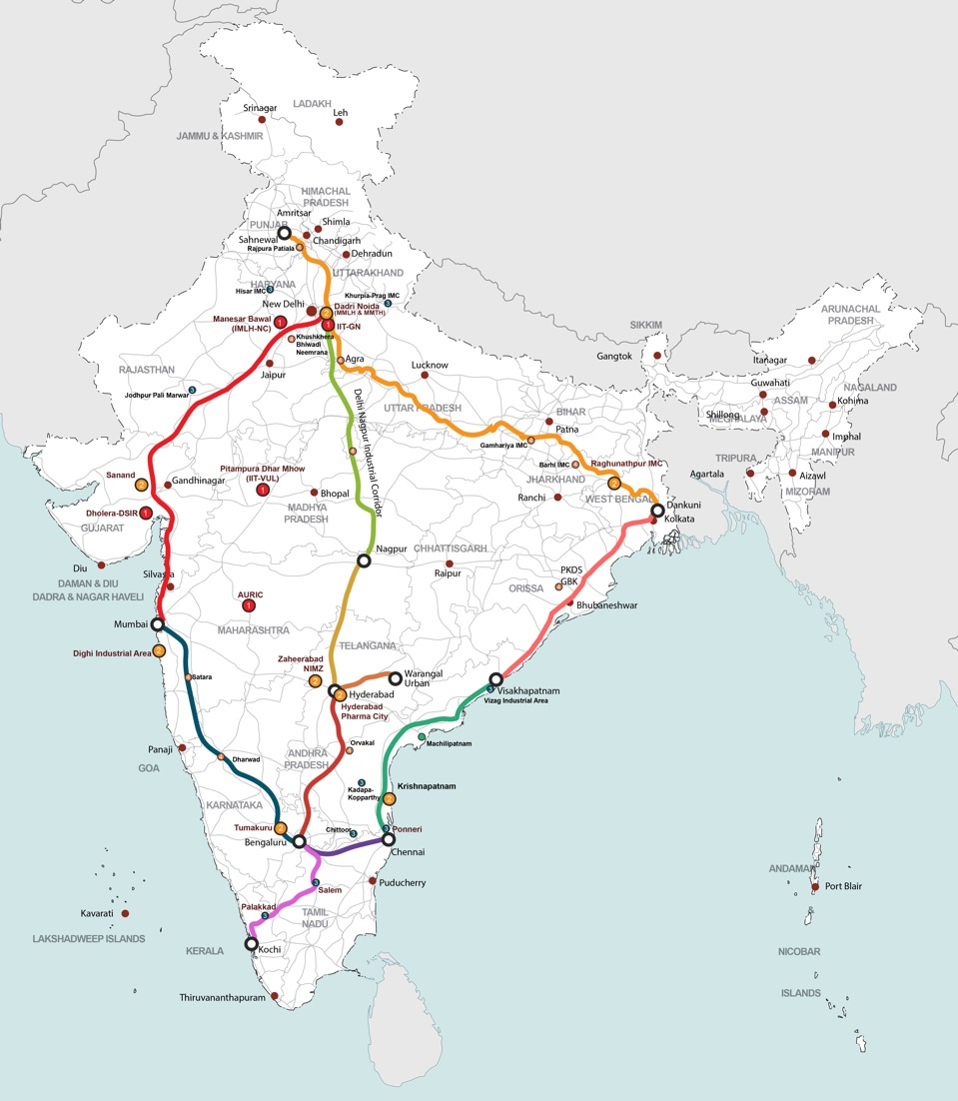
11 National Industrial Corridors of India.

== Project details ==
It is a combination of greenfield and brownfield expressway which passes through Haryana, Punjab, and Jammu and Kashmir. It starts from Kundli Manesar Palwal (KMP) Expressway near Nilauthi village in Jhajjar district. It will lessen the workload of Grand Trunk Road. The Ministry of Road Transport and Highways of the NDA government planned to construct ten expressways in the country under Bharatmala Pariyojana, one of which would connect the national capital Delhi with Katra and Amritsar via Kharkhoda, Gohana, Jind, Sangrur, Malerkotla, Ludhiana, Jalandhar, Gurdaspur.

The Greenfield expressway splits into two near Nakodar. One greenfield section towards Amritsar would pass nearby Sultanpur Lodhi, Goindwal Sahib, Khadoor Sahib, TarnTarn and ends near Sri Guru Ram Das Ji International Airport. The second section goes straight to Katra through Gurdaspur, bypassing Kathua and Jammu, and it consists of both greenfield and brownfield parts. Central and state governments also agreed to connect Dera Baba Nanak and Kartarpur Corridor with this expressway project. Nearly 14,000 acres of land in Punjab and 5,000 acres of Haryana will be acquired to construct these expressways. .

== Construction ==
The NHAI has divided the construction work of Delhi–Amritsar–Katra Expressway into 2 phases with a total of 21 construction packages.

=== Phase 1 ===
- The construction work of 397.7 km (247.1 mi) long Delhi–Nakodar–Gurdaspur section is divided into 12 packages. Package 8 to 12 has been awarded to the joint venture (JV) of Evrascon and MKC Infrastructure Limited (MKCIL).

Sr. No.	Package	Segment Length	Contractor
1.	Nilauthi (Jhajjar)–Rukhi Pana (Sonipat)	34.0 km (21.1 mi)	KCC Buildcon
2.	Rukhi Pana (Sonipat)–Gangana (Sonipat)	26.8 km (16.7 mi)	CDS Infra Projects
3.	Gangana (Sonipat)–Alewa (Jind)	30.6 km (19.0 mi)	KCC Buildcon
4.	Alewa (Jind)–Kharak Pandwa (Kaithal)	28.8 km (17.9 mi)	NKC Projects
5.	Kharak Pandwa (Kaithal)–Ghagga (Patiala)	37.6 km (23.4 mi)	CDS Infra Projects
6.	Ghagga (Patiala)–Bhawanigarh (Sangrur)	30.9 km (19.2 mi)	Shiv Build India
7.	Bhawanigarh (Sangrur)–Bhogiwal (Malerkotla)	36.9 km (22.9 mi)	Ceigall India
8.	Bhogiwal (Malerkotla)–Mullanpur Dakha (Ludhiana)	35.0 km (21.7 mi)	Evrascon – MKCIL JV
9.	Mullanpur Dakha–Nakodar–Kang Sahbu	34.0 km (21.1 mi)	Evrascon – MKCIL JV
10.	Kang Sahbu (Jalandhar)–Khojewal (Kapurthala)	15.5 km (9.6 mi)	Evrascon – MKCIL JV
11.	Khojewal (Kapurthala)–Sri Hargobindpur	43.0 km (26.7 mi)	Evrascon – MKCIL JV
12.	Sri Hargobindpur–Gurdaspur	35.3 km (21.9 mi)	Evrascon – MKCIL JV

==== Nakodar–Amritsar spur ====
- The construction work of 99 km (62 mi) long Nakodar–Amritsar spur section is divided into 3 packages. Nakodar–Amritsar section will merge with Delhi–Nakodar–Gurdaspur section on Package-9 (Mullanpur Dakha–Kang Sahbu).

Sr. No.	Package	Segment Length	Contractor
1.	Nakodar (Jalandhar)–Dhunda (Tarn Taran)	41.0 km (25.5 mi)	SP Singla Constructions
2.	Dhunda (Tarn Taran)–Manawala Khurd (Tarn Taran)	30.0 km (18.6 mi)	Ceigall India
3.	Manawala Khurd (Tarn Taran)–Harsha Chhina (Amritsar)	28.0 km (17.4 mi)	Vozrozhdenie India

=== Phase 2 ===
- Gurdaspur–Katra section

Sr. No.	Package	Segment Length	Contractor
13.	Details awaited	25.8 km (16.0 mi)	Tender Notice pending
14.	Balsua (Gurdaspur)–Gurah Baildaran (Kathua)	44.6 km (27.7 mi)	Megha Engineering & Infrastructures
15.	Gurah Baildaran (Kathua) – Jakh (Samba)	35.15 km (21.84 mi)	Vishwa Samudra Engineering
16.	Jakh (Samba)–Jammu Airport (Jammu)	11.8 km (7.3 mi)	Shivalaya Construction Company
17.	Kunjwani (Jammu) – Sidhra (Jammu) & Domel (Udhampur) – Katra (Reasi)	28.9 km (18.0 mi)	Apco Infratech
18.	Details awaited	15.3 km (9.5 mi)	Gawar Construction

== Route alignment ==
=== Delhi to Nakodar (Main route) ===
The Phase-1 of Delhi–Amritsar–Katra Expressway consists of two sections, namely Delhi–Nakodar–Gurdaspur (NE-5) and Nakodar–Amritsar (NE-5A). The Phase-2 consists of Gurdaspur–Katra section. Following is the alignment agreed by the Governments of Haryana, Punjab, and Jammu and Kashmir with the NHAI.

==== Delhi ====
Haryana to Kanjhawala (UER-II) extension: DPR was being prepared for this 20 km section in March 2025, which will be ready by Sept-Oct 2025, after which tenders for constructions will be invited.

- Jhajjar district
  - Western Peripheral Expressway (also called KMP Expressway), starting near village Nilauthi Bahadurgarh.
- West Delhi district
  - Kanjhawala at UER-II.

==== Haryana ====
Alignment is from Nilothi-Kharkhoda–Gohana (west)–Jind (east)–Safidon (west)–Ratoli (Ambala–Narnaul)–Assandh (west)–Kalayat–Kaithal (west)–Barta. There is a proposal to extend it in Delhi from Nilothi to "Urban Extension Road II".

- Jhajjar district
  - Western Peripheral Expressway (also called KMP Expressway), starting near village Nilauthi Bahadurgarh.
- Rohtak district
  - Hassangarh, between Sampla–Kharkhoda on NH334B.
  - SH-18 Rohtak–Kharkhoda (northwest of Kharkhoda)
- Sonipat district
  - Gohana city on the west side on NH-709 Rohtak–Gohana–Panipat Highway between Rohtak-Gohana.
  - between Lahkan Majra and Gohana.
  - SH-11 Jind–Gohana–Sonipat between Jind and Gohana.
- Jind district
  - Jind city (east of),
  - The interchange with SH-14 Jind–Panipat 18 km east of Jind near Pilu Khera.
  - Ratoli, (west of) interchange with Trans-Haryana Expressway between Jind–Safidon.
  - Alewa, 25 km northeast of Jind between Jind–Assandh on NH-709A.
  - Pegan, 25 km north of Jind between Jind–Kaithal Road
- Kaithal district
  - Kalayat (west of Kaithal), between Narwana–Kaithal on NH-152.
  - Barta (west of Kaithal city) on Haryana SH-8 Kaithal–Khanauri State Highway, exits Haryana state here and enters Punjab at Galoli.

==== Punjab ====
- Patiala district
  - Galoli southeast of Patran, enters here on Kaithal–Khanauri Haryana SH-8.
  - Patran (northeast of), between Patran-Samana on Moonak-Patran-Samana Punjab SH-10.
- Sangrur district
  - Bhawanigarh, west of Sangrur between Roshanwala–Bhawanigarh on NH-7 Barnala–Sangrur–Bhawanigarh–Patiala–Chandigarh.
  - between Dhuri–Nabha.
  - between Dhuri–Bagrian
  - between Dhuri–Amargarh
- Malerkotla district
  - between Malerkotla–Nabha at the southeast of Malerkotla and northwest of Nabha.
  - between Malerkotla–Khanna, immediate east of Malerkotla and southwest of Khanna on Malerkotla-Khanna Road.
  - between Malerkotla–Ludhiana, immediate north of Malerkotla and south of Ludhiana on Sangrur–Malerkotla-Ludhiana Punjab SH-11.
  - Ahmedgarh between Malerkotla–Ludhiana
- Ludhiana district
  - Jodhan (southwest of Ludhiana), on Raikot–Jodhan–Ludhiana road.
  - Ludhiana (west of), with a new Jodhan–Doraha spur as a south bypass of Ludhiana, at Doraha this spur will connect to the existing NH-5 Ludhiana-Doraha-Ropar–Kharar–Chandigarh Airport–Panchkula.
  - Mullanpur Dakha, southeast of Ludhiana on NH-5 Firozepur–Moga–Jagraon–Ludhiana–Chandigarh Road. Interconnect with Ludhiana–Bathinda–Ajmer Expressway.
  - between Sidhwan Bet and Ludhiana, east of Ludhiana on Punjab SH-20 Firozepur–Zira–Sidhwan Bet–Ludhiana Road.
- Jalandhar district
  - Through tehsils of Phillaur, Nakodar, Jalandhar II.
  - Nakodar (east of), between Nakodar-Phagwara.
  - Nakodar (northeast of), between Nakodar-Jalandhar on NH-703 Nakodar-Jalandhar Road.
  - Nakodar (north of), 2 following separate Y-fork expressways spurs from Nakodar: one to Amritsar–Kartarpur in the west and another to Jammu–Katra in the northwest - one goes to Pathankot–Jammu and another goes to Amritsar.

=== Nakodar to Amritsar (Spur-1) ===
First greenfield expressway spur (99 km long) from Nakodar to Amritsar through Sultanpur Lodhi, Goindwal Sahib, Khadur Sahib, Tarn Taran Sahib and ends at Sri Guru Ram Das Ji International Airport (Amritsar Airport).

==== Punjab ====
- Jalandhar district
  - Nakodar (north of)
- Kapurthala district
  - Sultanpur Lodhi (northeast of), between Sultanpur Lodhi and Kapurthala on NH-703A Firozepur-Sultanpur Lodhi–Kapurthala Road.
  - Tehsils of Kapurthala and Bholath
- Tarn Taran district
  - Goindwal Sahib (east of), between Goindwal Sahib and Kapurthala on Taran Taran–Goindwal Sahib–Kapurthala Road.
  - Khadoor Sahib (east of), Khadur Sahib lies east of Taran Taran and north of Goindwal Sahib
  - Tarntaran Sahib
- Amritsar district
  - Rakh Manawala (southeast of Amritsar), on Amritsar bypass on AH1 Amritsar–Jalandhar Road.
  - New Amritsar (east of Amritsar), on Amritsar bypass on NH-503A Amritsar–Sri Hargobindpur-Hoshiarpur Road.
  - Verka (northeast of Amritsar) between Amritsar and Batala on NH54 Amritsar–Batala–Gurdaspur Road.
  - Sri Guru Ram Das Ji International Airport, with plans to extend a semi-circular loop spur to Dera Baba Nanak near Kartarpur Corridor in the north and then back to this expressway at Gurdaspur in the northeast.

=== Nakodar to Katra (Spur-2) ===
Second greenfield expressway spur from Nakodar to Katra passing through Kartarpur, Gurdaspur, and Dinanagar.

==== Punjab ====
- Jalandhar district
  - Nakodar (north of)
  - Kapurthala (east of), between Kapurthala and Jalandar on NH-703A Firozepur–Sultanpour Lodhi–Kapurthala–Jalandhar Road.
  - Kapurthala (northeast of), between Kapurthala and Kartarpur.
  - Kapurthala (north of), between Radha Soami Satsang Beas and Kartarpur on AH1 Amritsar–Radha Soami Satsang Beas–Kartarpur–Jalandhar.
- Gurdaspur district
  - Sri Hargobindpur (southwest of), route realignment done at some stretches due to high-pressure "Bathinda–Jammu Gas Pipeline" and "GIGL's CNG Gas Plant" near Mari Buchian.
  - Sri Hargobindpur (west of), between Amritsar and Sri Hargobindpur on NH-503A Amritsar–Sri Hargobindpur-Urmar Tanda–Hoshiarpur Road.
  - Gurdaspur (southeast of), between Qadian–Harchowal.
  - Gurdaspur (east of), between Gurdaspur and Mukerian on Punjab SH-25 Gurdaspur–Mukerian–Talwara Road.
  - Gurdaspur (north of), at Dinanagar between Gurdaspur and Pathankot on NH-54 Gurdaspur–Pathankot Road.
- Pathankot district
  - Pathankot (southwest of), at Bhoa.
  - Pathankot (west of), at Sunder Chak

==== Jammu and Kashmir ====
- Jammu district, bypassing Kathua.
  - Jammu
- Reasi district
  - Katra (location of Vaishno Devi temple).

=== Inter-connectivity ===
Following provide the inter-connectivity:

- Amritsar:
  - Gurdaspur: Amritsar–Gurdaspur NH-54 highway converted to signal-free route.
  - Kartarpur Corridor: NH-354 Amritsar–Dera Baba Nanak (Kartarpur Corridor) converted to signal-free route.
- Ludhiana:
  - Chandigarh: NH-5 Ludhiana–Chandigarh Highway via Kharar and Ropar strengthened and widened to 4 lanes, to provide connectivity to Chandigarh Airport via Urban Extension Road II. This will reduce Ludhiana-Chandigarh time from 1.5 hours to less than one hour and Chandigarh–Amritsar from 4 hours to 2 hours.
  - Bathinda: Ludhiana–Bathinda–Ajmer Expressway interconnects near Mullanpur Dakha.
- Jind: Trans-Haryana Expressway (Ambala–Narnaul) near Pillu Khera. This will reduce the time from Chandigarh Airport to IGI Delhi airport from 5 hours to 2 hours, and Delhi to Manali from 14 hours to 8 hours.

== Status updates ==
- 2017 Dec: National Highways Authority of India (NHAI) appointed a consultant to prepare the Detailed Project Report (DPR) within 10 months by Oct 2018.
- 2019 Nov: DPR of Delhi-Amritsar-Katra expressway completed by NHAI.
- 2020 Jun–Jul: In Haryana, Punjab, and Jammu and Kashmir, the land acquisition process started.
- 2021 Apr: Construction work awarded by NHAI for all 12 packages on 397.7 Km long Delhi-Nakodar-Gurdaspur section, and 2 out of 3 packages on 99km long Nakodar-Amritsar section.
- 2021 Sep: NHAI announces the completion deadline is by October 2023.
- 2022 Apr: Prime Minister Narendra Modi laid the foundation stone for the expressway on 5 January and construction started. Prime Minister Modi will inaugurate operational parts of partially completed expressway before 2024 LS polls: Nitin Gadkari.
- 2024 Aug: Likely completion date for Delhi-Ludhiana Katra is 31 December 2025 and 1 April 2026 for the Ludhiana-Amritsar spur. 669 km Delhi-Katra expressway almost complete in most states except Punjab due to the land acquisition issues in Punjab. Haryana and Jammu and Kashmir packages are 80-90% complete. In Punjab, where the completion rate for various packages is 3% to 90%, only 273 km is complete and 362 km is incomplete. In Punjab of the total 295 km of land required, the land acquisition of 230 km is complete in 11 out of 13 districts except Ludhiana and Gurdaspur, the remaining 65 km will be acquired by the end of September 2024.
- 2025 Nov: Due to the land acquisition issues in some parts of Punjab the completion date of the expressway is pushed back to June 2026. NHAI is actively trying to resolve the issues with the farmers for the completion of the project without any further delay.
- According to Newspaper report, now the Minister has confirmed the completion date by March 2028.

== See also ==
- List of highways in Haryana
- Expressways in Punjab
- Expressways of India
- Amritsar Ring Road
- Amritsar–Jamnagar Expressway
- Western Peripheral Expressway
- Eastern Peripheral Expressway
- Trans-Haryana Expressway (Ambala–Narnaul)
