= Jagbir Singh Chhina =

- Freedom Fighter
- Born: 10 March 1920; Amritsar, Punjab, India
- Died: 19 March 2012 (aged 92)
- Occupation: Politician

Jagbir Singh Chhina (1920-2012) was a freedom fighter who worked during the freedom movement with Comrade Achhar Singh Chhina, Pratap Singh Kairon, Sohan Singh Josh, Mohan Singh Batth, Gurdial Singh Dhillon and Harkishan Singh Surjeet against the British empire. He has served the community since 1938 as an active member of society.

== Harsha Chhina Mogha Morcha 1946–47 ==
At the age of 26, when 'Mogha Morcha of Harsha Chhina' was launched in 1946 under the leadership of Achhar Singh Chhina of the Communist party against the ruling government, Chhina was arrested along with 950 protestors and detained in Bostal Jail Lahore for three months. He played an active role in the Harse Chhina Mogha Morcha rebellion in 1947.

As a result of this movement, all political parties successfully negotiated with the ruling British government to give farming water to the agriculturalists as per the agreement.

== Political Advisor to Chief Minister of Punjab 1958–1964 ==
After the independence of India (1958), he became the political advisor of S. Pratap Singh Kairon, Chief Minister of Punjab and actively worked with him in the same position till 1964.

== Social work ==
Chhina was an independent activist who had seen the dream of an independent India at the age of 14. He was actively involved with the freedom movement and dedicated his whole life to society. During his political career, he started two educational institutes and gave one educational, sports and cultural club to society. He is the founder of Khalsa High School, Gurdwara Guru ka Bagh, Naveen Janta High School, Harsha Chhina known as Comrade Achhar Singh Chhina Sr. Sec. School and Comrade Achhar Singh Chhina Sports and Educational Trust.

=== Powerhouse ===
Chhina demanded a powerhouse to give a regular supply of power to farmers. As a result, the Punjab Government set up the government's first power house in 1960 at Kukranwala.

=== Flood control and rural development ===
As Subdivision Ajnala was affected by the river Ravi every year until 1970, Chhina requested the Punjab government to set up Construction Division to build roads and bridges over the Sakki Nala and Sakki Nala flood diversions to save the life and crops of the villagers living near to the Ravi and Sakki Nalla. The Punjab Government developed a strategic plan dedicated to the Ajnala subdivision and dedicated this task to the PWD department to save this area from yearly floods.

"Official and Non-official Visitors". Punjabrevenue.nic.in. Archived from the original on 31 January 2009.

Harsha Chhina Block Because Chhina demanded a separate block for the focused development of this specific area, the Punjab government set up this block. As per the Administrative Division of Amritsar, Harsha Chhina is one of the eight blocks which has its own local government for the development of the area.

== Positions ==
- 1945 - 1968 Sarpanch Panchayat, Village Harsha Chhina, Amritsar, Punjab.
- 1954 - 1959 Member, Shiromani Gurudwara Prabandhak Committee (SGPC)
- 1958 - 1965 Member, Marketing Committee, Ajnala, Amritsar.
- 1959 - 1962 Director, District Whole Sale Co-operative Society, Amritsar
- 1960 - 1965 Chairman, Block Samiti Chogawan, DistrictAmritsar.
- 1960 - 1965 Member, Zila Parishad District, Amritsar
- 1960 - 1965 General Secretary, District Congress Committee (I) Amritsar (Rural)
- 1965 - 1969 President, Co-operative Marketing Society Ajnala, Amritsar.
- 1973 - 1979 Chairman, Co-operative Land Mortgage Bank, Ajnala, Amritsar.
- 1973 - 1976 Chairman, State Tube well Corporation, Punjab.
- 1973 - 1977 Member, Marketing Committee Ajnala, Amritsar
- 1975 - 1979 Chairman, Block Samiti Chogawan, Amritsar
- 1975 - 1978 Member, Zila Parishad District, Amritsar
- 1975 - 1976 Member, Executive Committee PPCC (I).
- 1977 - 1978 Chairman, State Land Mortgage Bank Punjab, Chandigarh.
- 1977 - 1978 Director, All India land Development Cooperation, India
- 1971 - 1992 General Secretary, District Congress Committee (I) Amritsar (Rural)

== Honorary award ==
Punjab Government and Government of India declared Chhina a freedom fighter and awarded Tamra Patras as honour.

As a participants of the Harsha Chhina Mogha Morcha, he was recognized as freedom fighters by the Indian government, and entitled freedom fighter pensions from the Freedom Fighters and Rehabilitation Division.

== See also ==
- Punjab's political families
