= India For Sports =

- Abbreviation: IFS
- Formation: 2014
- Purpose: Sports
- Region served: India
- Website: www.indiaforsports.com

India For Sports was a crowd funding platform for Indian athletes. It was incepted in June, 2014 to help Indian athletes with funding. It is running 6 fund raising campaigns for athletes in individual sports disciplines such as athletics, table tennis and wrestling.

== Organisation ==
India For Sports (IFS) was set up with a vision to provide a same level playing field to the Indian athletes when they compete at international events. The organization tries to solve the basic issue of funding for the deserving athletes. It also provides the athletes visibility by covering their stories, hardships, achievements and activities. The organization also connects the athletes to corporate sponsors and other sports aiding organization to provide facilities such as dietitians, nutritionists, psychologists etc.

== Achievements ==
The organization has successfully raised funds in excess of 2L INR since its inception from more than 125 contributors. The funds have been raised for Arpinder Singh, Amit Kumar, Sharath Kamal, Inderjeet Singh and Khushbir Kaur. The organization has been able to successfully bring out stories of its athletes out in the public through its social media disseminations. It also has organized psychological sessions for two of its athletes. Inderjeet Singh benefitted a lot from such mental stability session which resulted in him winning bronze medal in Asian Games, 2014. The organization also bring out stories of other athletes in order to provide them the much deserving visibility in the public eye.

== Campaigns ==
- Arpinder Singh
- Amit Kumar
- Sharath Kamal
- Inderjeet Singh
- Khushbir Kaur
