= Amritsar Ring Road =

Highway in Amritsar, Punjab, India

Route information
- Length: 98 km (61 mi)
- Existed: 2020–present

Location
- Country: India
- States: Punjab

Highway system
- Roads in India; Expressways; National; State; Asian

Amritsar Ring Road is a 4 lane access-controlled greenfield highway under construction in Amritsar, Punjab, India. This project is divided into 2 sections. The first is part of the Delhi–Amritsar–Katra Expressway and starts from Rajewala village and passes through Mudhal and Loharka, terminating at Harse Chhina. The second sections starts from Rajewala village and passes through Chabba and Khasa, terminating at Harse Chhina and thus making a highway ring around Amritsar. Total cost of the project is estimated at ₹1,150 crore.

== Land acquisition ==
A total of 264 hectares of land is to be acquired for the route between Rajewala, Chabba, Khasa, and Harse Chhina. Land acquisition notification was issued in July 2020. The acquisition of land between Rajewala, Mudhal, and Harse Chhina package is part of Delhi-Amritsar-Katra Expressway.

== Status updates ==
- June 2020: Amritsar ring road passed by the National Highways Authority of India (NHAI) under Bharatmala Pariyojana.
- July 2020: Land acquisition notification issued for Amritsar ring road.
- Jan 2021: Tenders are out for four-lane Amritsar ring road (greenfield alignment) from new Tarn Taran Road to Ajnala Road from design 0.750 km to design 43.750 km (design length - 43.00 km) and upgradation of the existing Amritsar-Khemkaran Road (NH-354) to four-lane configuration from design 71.496 km to design 78.440 km (design length - 6.944 km) [total design length - 49.944 km]

== See also ==
- List of highways in Haryana
- Expressways in Punjab
- Expressways of India
- Golden Temple
- Delhi–Amritsar–Katra Expressway
- Amritsar–Jamnagar Expressway
