= Ghagga kothi =

Mansion in Punjab, India

Ghagga Kothi is a palatial mansion located in Ghagga town of Patiala District. It was built by the Maharaja of Patiala to accommodate himself and his guest who went there to hunt. It was taken over by Punjab Police after accession of Patiala State into India.

Ghagga Kothi is a tiny square fortress in about 8 acres (32,000 m^{2}) with a very beautiful rest housebuilt in the middle. The rest house was converted to a Station Head Office for Punjab Police with the Officer's residence on the upper floor.

There used to be another building near the Kothi outside the 'wall', on the south-west side known as Lassi Khaana. The building used to serve as the kitchen to the guests at the Kothi.

During hunting expeditions the Viceroy of India and Prince of Wales once stayed here.

Due to poor upkeep by the government, Lassi Khaana looked deserted ruins for long time, eventually met the dust.
