= Ludhiana–Bathinda–Ajmer Expressway =

Road in India

Route information
- Length: 600 km (370 mi)

Major junctions
- North end: Ludhiana
- South end: Ajmer

Location
- Country: India
- States: Punjab, Haryana and Rajasthan

Highway system
- Roads in India; Expressways; National; State; Asian

Ludhiana–Bathinda–Ajmer Expressway (earlier called Pathankot-Ajmer Expressway), consisting of 2 separate Ludhiana–Bathinda Expressway and Bathinda–Ajmer Expressway projects on the "Ludhiana–Ajmer Economic Corridor (EC-8)", is 6-lane (extendable to 8-lanes) access-controlled under-construction express national highway project by the NHAI which will connect Pathankot via Ludhiana to Bathinda and Ajmer. The movement of goods will be facilitated, via Ajmer, from northern states to ports at western coast such as Kandla port.

The expressway for the "Ludhiana–Ajmer Economic Corridor (EC-8)" was redesigned and broken into the following 3 different expressways, Pathankot–Ludhiana Expressway (subsumed in the greenfield Delhi–Amritsar–Katra Expressway), Ludhiana–Bathinda Expressway (greenfield), and Bathinda-Ajmer Expressway (mix of brownfield upgrade and greenfield).

== Route ==
The expressway for the "Ludhiana–Ajmer Economic Corridor (EC-8)" was redesigned and broken into the following 3 different expressways:

=== Pathankot-Ludhiana Expressway ===
It is already part of another larger standalone greenfield Delhi–Amritsar–Katra Expressway project.

=== Ludhiana–Bathinda Expressway ===
"Ludhiana–Bathinda Expressway" is an approved 75.543 km long ₹1,716.17 crore (US$200 million) standalone greenfield project. It begins from the Delhi–Amritsar–Katra Expressway at "Ballowal" village 10 km southwest of Ludhiana and end at the Rampura Phul near Bathinda on the "Amritsar–Bathinda Expressway" section of the larger "Amritsar–Jamnagar Expressway".

- Package-1 on Bathinda side: ends at Rampura Phul on NH-7 between Bathinda–Barnala.
- Package-2 on Ludhiana side: begins at Ballowal on Delhi-Amritsar-Katra Expressway and ending near Sehna near Barnala. Includes connectivity to the Ludhiana International Airport.

=== Bhatinda–Ajmer Expressway ===
"Bhatinda–Ajmer Expressway", approved by NHAI in May 2018 as a standalone greenfield project, will reduce the existing distance between Bhatinda and Ajmer by 120 km. Project is mix of greenfield and brownfield upgrade and greenfield:

- Bhatinda-Bhanin greenfield: via Sirsa (Jodhkan and Rampura Dhillon), Bhadra.
- Bhanin-Fatehpur brownfield upgrade of NH-703: via Taranagar, Churu, Shekhawati, between Salasar-Sikar.
- Fatehpur to Ajmer greenfield: via Kuchaman City, Makrana.

==== Punjab ====
Existing NH route passes through 2 districts.

- Bathinda district
  - Bathinda, begins at Rampura Phul on NH-7 between Bathinda–Barnala.
  - Rampura Phul to Maur via existing NH-254.
- Mansa district
  - Sardulgarh on NH-703 Mansa-Sirsa, greenfield alignment from Maur to twin towns of Rori-Sardulgarh on Punjab-Haryana border.

==== Haryana ====
Greenfield alignment passes through 1 district:

- Sirsa district
  - Rori in Haryana on SH-17 Rori-Talwandi Sabo and SH-101 Rori-Mandi Dabwali.
  - Sirsa (east of), near Jodhka on NH-9 Sirsa-Hisar-Delhi.
  - Sirsa (south of), near Nathusari Chopta on SH-103 Sirsa-Bhadra and SH-104 Nohar-Bhattu Mandi.
  - Rampura Dhillon in Haryana on SH-17 Rori-Talwandi Sabo and SH-101 Rori-Mandi Dabwali.

==== Rajasthan ====
Greenfield alignment and upgrade of existing route passes through 5 districts. The following is greenfield route except where upgrade to existing route is mentioned.

- Hanumangarh district
  - between Gogamedi–Bhadra.
- Churu district
  - SH-31 between Sahwa and Bhadra, upgrade of existing SH.
  - Bhanin on SH-36 between Sahwa and Taranagar, upgrade of existing SH.
  - Taranagar on SH-6 between Sardarshahar and Rajgarh (Sadulpur).
  - Churu, upgrade of existing SH-36 from Taranagar to Churu.
- Sikar district
  - Fatehpur, from Churu via exiting NH-52.
  - Laxmangarh between Salasar-Shekhawati, from Fatehpur via exiting NH-58.
  - Sewad Bari toll plaza on SH-20, between Haneri and Shekhawati.
  - Losal on MDR-24 between Didwana and Khoor.
- Nagaur district
  - Kuchaman City (north of), at Ranasar on SH-7.
  - SH-7, upgrade of existing SH route from Kuchaman City-Parbatsar.
- Ajmer district
  - SH-7, upgrade of existing SH route from Parbatsar-Kishangarh.
  - Ajmer, from Kishangarh to Ajmer via existing NH-448.

== Inter-connectivity ==
Following either interconnect or provide the alternate connectivity:

- Ludhiana: Delhi–Amritsar–Katra Expressway ring road Sudhar-Mullanpur state highway .
- Bathinda: Amritsar–Jamnagar Expressway (NH-754) at Dabwali.

== Current Status ==
=== Ludhiana–Bathinda Expressway ===
75 km greenfield expressway likely to be completed by end 2026.

- 2019 Oct: DPR completed.
- 2024 Aug: Project, which was planned to be constructed from 2022 to 2025, stalled after contractors quit the project due to the non-acquisition of land by Punjab government.
- 2025 Feb: 95% (72.04 km of the total 75.54 km) land acquired and handed over to NHAI for both packages, including Package-1 30.03-km long costing Rs 906.51 crore and the Package-2 45.246 km long costing Rs 1,555.13 crore. Project is likely to be completed in 3 years by March 2028.

=== Bathinda–Ajmer Expressway ===
626 km greenfield expressway.

- 2025 Jul: Land acquisition not done, construction not yet commenced, completion date not yet announced.

== See also ==
- Bharatmala
- List of highways in Haryana
- Expressways in Punjab
- Expressways of India
- Industrial corridor
