= Renjith Maheshwary =

Indian triple jumper

Renjith Maheśwary
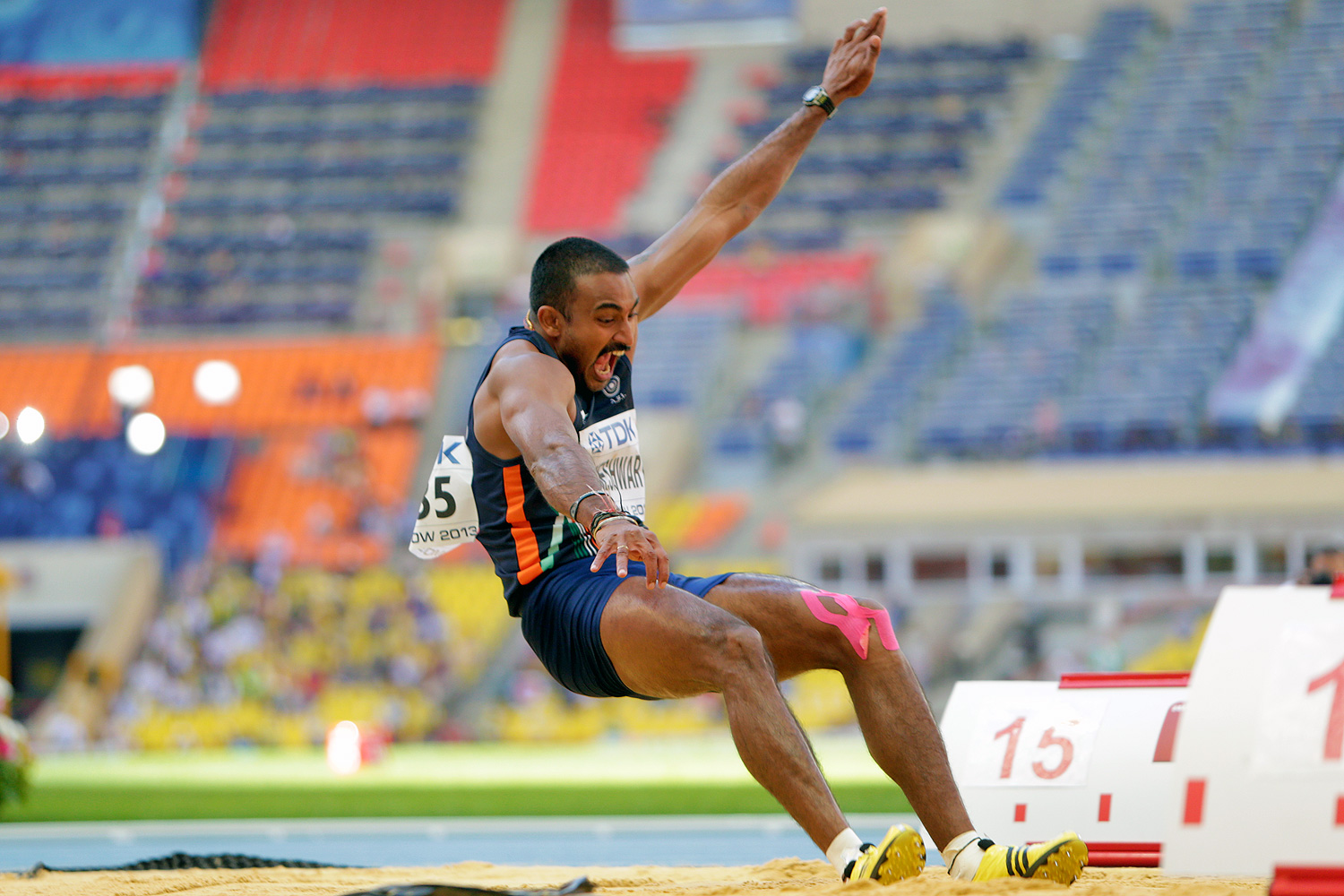

Personal information
- Nationality: Indian
- Born: 30 January 1986 (age 40) Channanikadu, Kottayam, Kerala, India

Sport
- Country: India
- Event: Triple Jump

Achievements and titles
- Personal bests: 17.30 m NR (Bangalore 2016)
Medal record
Men's athletics
Representing India
Commonwealth Games
Bronze medal – third place	2010 Delhi	Triple jump
Asian Championships
Gold medal – first place	2007 Amman	Triple jump
Silver medal – second place	2013 Pune	Triple jump
Asian Indoor Championships
Silver medal – second place	2016 Doha	Triple jump
South Asian Games
Gold medal – first place	2016 Guwahati	Triple Jump

Renjith Maheśwary (born 30 January 1986 in Kottayam, Kerala) is an Indian triple jumper. He finished fourth at the 2006 Asian Games and won the 2007 Asian Championships. He also competed at the 2007 World Championships, the 2011 World Championships and the 2013 World Championships but did not reach the final in any of those events. He represented India at the 2008 Beijing Olympics as well as in 2012 London Olympics. At the 2012 London Games as at the World Championships in Daegu, he committed three consecutive foul jumps at the qualifying stage, stopped his Olympic campaign. Renjith, had performed badly at the Beijing Olympics too, where he came up with a best of 15.77m. Later, he tested positive for a stimulant but was let off with a three-month suspension.

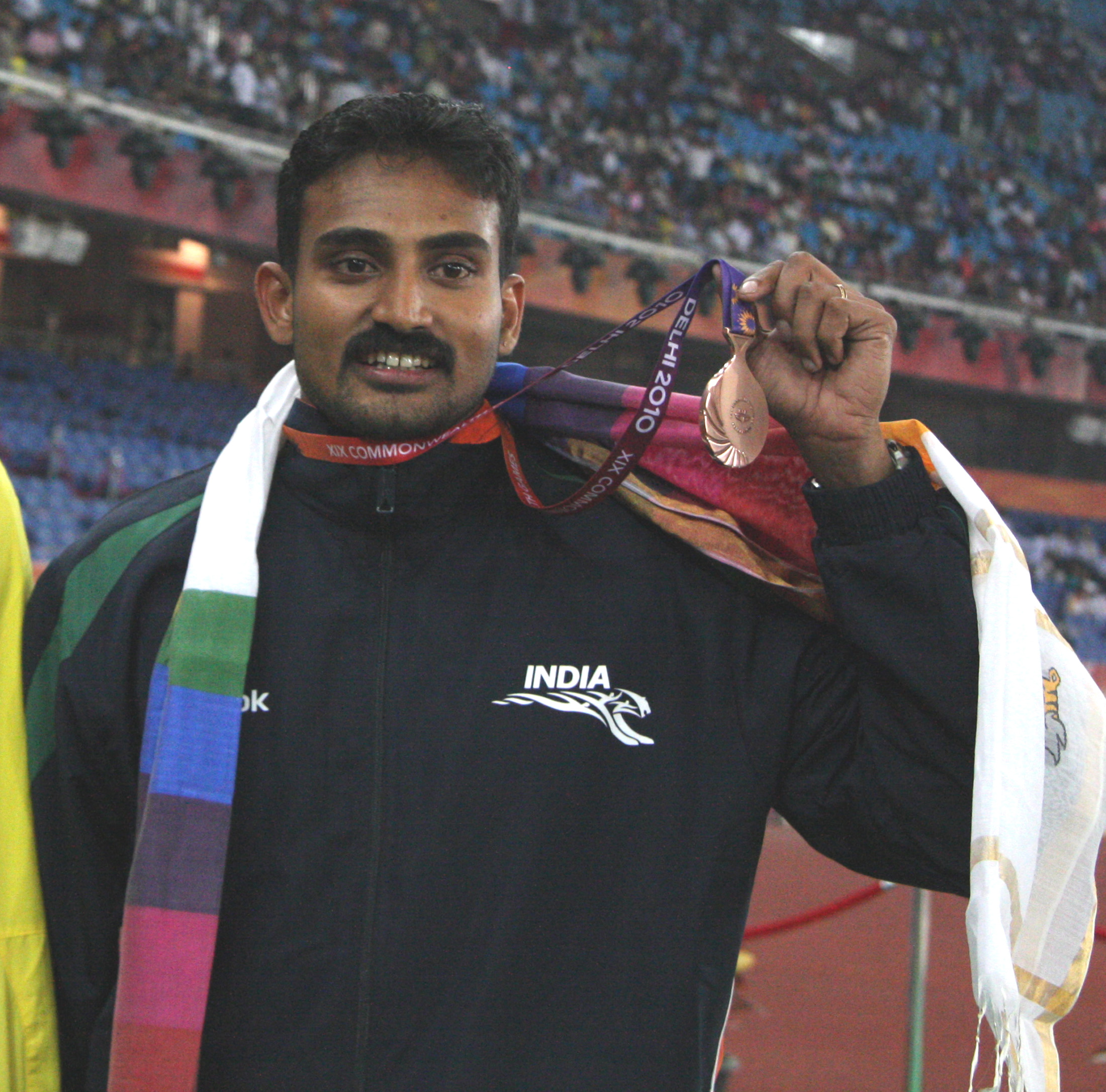
XIX Commonwealth Games-2010 Delhi (Athletics Men's Triple Jump) Renjith Maheswary of India won the bronze medal, at Jawaharlal Nehru Stadium, in New Delhi on October 12, 2010

With a jump of 17.07 metres at the 2010 Commonwealth Games, Renjith held the Indian national record till 2014, when it was beaten by Arpinder Singh. Now Renjith made a new Indian record of 17.30 m in Indian grand prix meet at Bengaluru on 11 July 2016

Renjith Maheswary has won the gold medal in Asian Grand Prix 2012.

Renjith is married to Indian pole vaulter and National record holder V. S. Surekha and they have two daughters, Jhiya and Sparsha Renjith.

On 19 September 2013, Sports Ministry of India announced that he would not be given Arjuna Award over the allegations of doping pending against him. Earlier his name figured among the list of Arjuna Awardees for 2013.

== See also ==
- List of Kerala Olympians
- List of Indian records in athletics
