= Sewad Chhoti =

Village in Rajasthan, India

Coordinates: 27.586°N 74.974°E

Sewad Chhoti is a small village in the Sikar district of Rajasthan, India. It is located immediately to the south of Sewad Bari, roughly 21 kilometres (13 mi) from the city of Sikar and 126 kilometres (78 mi) from the state capital Jaipur. The village had a population of 2,153 in 2011.
