= Bajuha Khurd =

- village
- Nickname: Chota Bajuha
- Location in Punjab, India Bajuha Khurd (India)
- Coordinates: 31.194517°N 75.573138°E
- Country: India
- State: Punjab
- District: Jalandhar
- Talukas: Nakodar

Languages
  - Official: Punjabi
  - Regional: Punjabi
- Time zone: UTC+5:30 (IST)
- PIN: 144033
- Telephone code: 01821
- Vehicle registration: PB- 08
- Nearest city: Nakodar

Bajuha Khurd is a small village in Nakodar. Nakodar is a tehsil in the city Jalandhar of the Indian state of Punjab. Kalan is a Persian language word which means Big and Khurd is a Persian word that means small. When two villages have close to similar or identical names, then they are usually distinguished as Kalan which means big, and Khurd which means small.

== Area ==
As misleading as the name might be, Bajuha Khurd is actually bigger in terms of area than its neighbouring village Bajuha Kalan. Surprisingly, it is one of the largest villages in the region with an area of about 791 hectares.

== STD code ==
Bajuha Khurd's STD code is 01821 and Postal code is 144033.

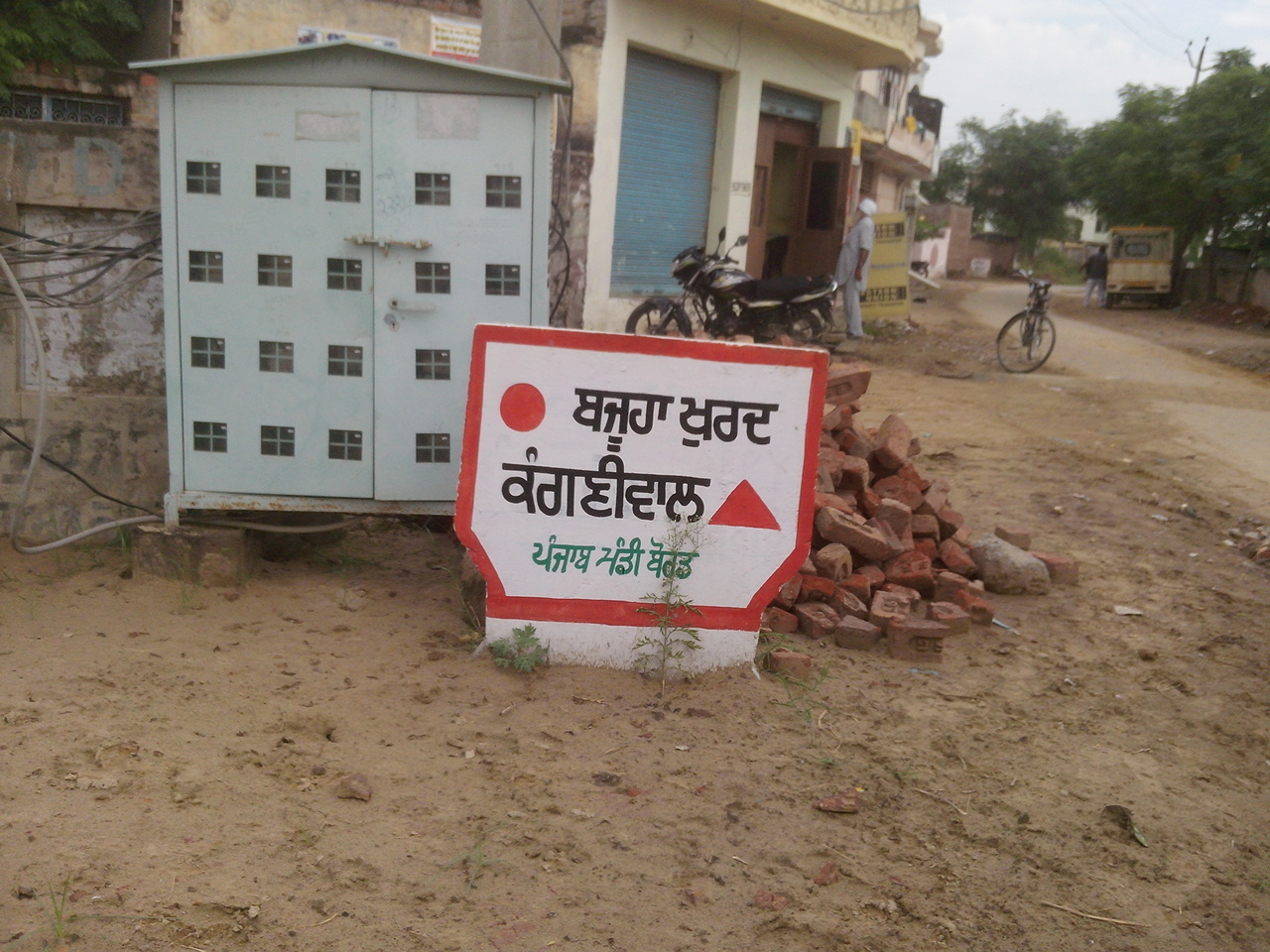
A way marker marking the limits of the village
