= Punjab Riyasti Praja Mandal =

Indian political party

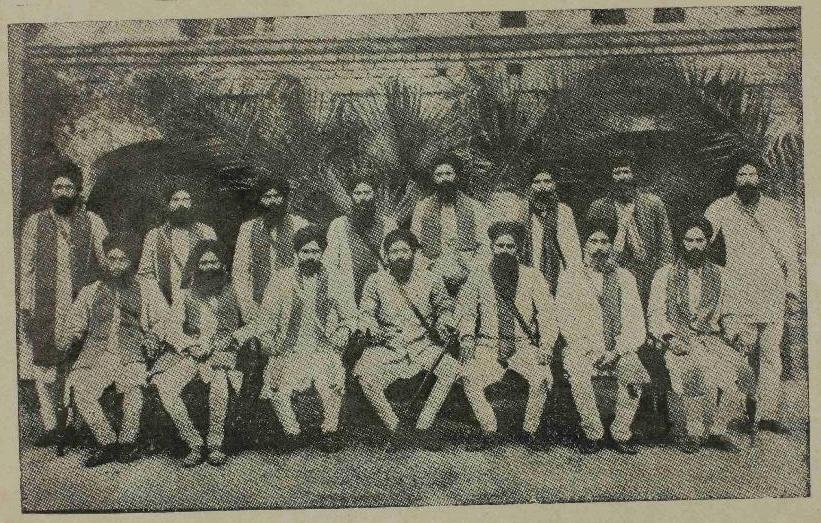
Group photograph of figures of the Praja Mandal movement

The Punjab Riyasti Praja Mandal (meaning "The Punjab Kingdom's Peoples' Party/Society") was an organization advocating for greater civil liberties and political rights in the princely-states of the Punjab. (Note: Also referred to as the Riyasat Parjamandal, sometimes spelt as Riasti Praja Mandal.) It was active from 17 July 1928 onwards during British rule until its lapse on 15 July 1948 with the creation of PEPSU. The organization was initially headed by its founder and president Sardar Sewa Singh Thikriwala. The vice President of this Party was Sardar Ridha Singh Akali of village Ghagga in Patiala district Most of its leaders and workers were Akalis but also included Kirtis (Punjabi Communists).

The Praja Mandal movement existed across India's over-six-hundred princely states, whilst its local manifestation in Punjab mostly covered the states of Patiala, Nabha, Jind, Malerkotla and Faridkot princely states initially but other areas later-on. Punjabi princely-states at the time were widely criticized for being oppressive and poorly governed. In 1928, the Punjab Riyasti Praja Mandal was established by Sewa Singh Thikriwala, who had been active in the ongoing Singh Sabha movement. The movement wanted self-rule for the people against the rulers of Punjab’s erstwhile princely-states. It also covered princely-states of Kashmir, the Punjab Hills, and the Shimla Hills. The Praja Mandal was tied-together with the rise of the Tenants movement in Punjab.

== Etymology ==
The word riyāstī refers to the collective rule of the kingdom consisting of the princely states whilst prajā means subject or people, meanwhile maṇḍal means society or party.

== Objectives ==
The main aims of the organization were:

1. Protection of the rights and liberties of the common people of the princely states
2. Establishing representative bodies in the princely states
3. Improvement of the well-being of the peasants of the princely states

The focus of the Punjabi organization and the wider pan-India Praja Mandal mission was to safeguard the civil liberties of the public, agitate against oppressive taxes, advocate for reforms in the status of the peasantry, establish educational institutions, and have a responsible administration. The organization also sought for the democratization of the princely-states and supported tenants against oppressive landlords.

Some of the Praja Mandal leaders focused on administrative reform whilst others concentrated on agrarian reform. Meanwhile, those with a Communist leaning tended to focus on agrarian conflicts, especially in Patiala, Malerkotla, Nabha, and Kalsia states.

== Administration ==
As per the body's constitution, membership was open to all adult inhabitants of the Punjabi princely states, regardless of their caste, class, or religion. Furthermore, a general council consisting of two hundred members was elected every two years by the members of the body, with the general council responsible for electing a fifteen member executive committee. The central organization managed the local outfits of the body and was affiliated to the All India States People's Conference. The body was active in the princely states of the Punjab Plains, Punjab Hills, Shimla Hills, and Kashmir regions.

== History ==
=== Overview ===
==== Establishment ====
The Punjab at the time was going through a period of socio-political and religious movements and upheaval due to a combination of factors, such as the Rowlatt Act, Jallianwala Bagh massacre, the Gurudwara Reform movement, and the violent Babbar Akali development. Meanwhile, inhabitants of the Punjabi princely-states grew frustrated by what was perceived as lavish spending on personal luxuries by the rulers while the people lacked personal freedom or political representation. Also, the rulers and officials of the princely states were harsh and intolerant toward any perceived criticisms of their governance and enjoyed full backing by the British colonial authorities. The All India States Peoples' Conference had been founded on 17 September 1927 to advocate for the people living in the over six hundred princely states of British India. A year later on, the Punjab Riyasti Praja Mandal was established at Mansa through a public announcement on 17 July 1928 for the same cause in Punjabi princely states by Akali workers from the princely states. The Akalis were invigorated due to their recent success in the Gurudwara Reform movement in obtaining custodianship over Sikh shrines from the pro-British mahants. Patiala's Akali leader, S. Sewa Singh Thikriwala, who was in prison at the time, was elected the President of the body whilst Sardar Ridha Singh Akali of village Ghagga was elected the Vice President, and Bhagwan Singh Longowalia was elected as the General Secretary. In the beginning, the organization was only operational in the princely states of Patiala, Jind, Nabha, and Faridkot, but was particularly focused against the reigning Patiala ruler, Maharaja Bhupinder Singh. In 1929, the Mujara Commission was established, which protested for the rights of Punjabi tenants against repressive landlords, despite the leaders of the Praja Mandal being imprisoned at the time.

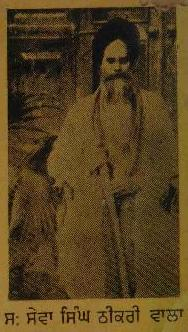
Photograph of Sewa Singh Thikriwala, leader of the Punjab Riyasti Praja Mandal

Between 1930–31, local branches of the organization operating in Jind, Nabha, Malerkotla, Kapurthala, and Faridkot states were organized. On 24 August 1933, Sardar Sewa Singh Thikriwala was arrested and sentenced to six years in prison, during which he died on 20 January 1935. Meanwhile, the General Secretary, Bhagwan Singh Longowalia was sentenced to twenty two years of imprisonment. Both of them had protested against their poor treatment in jail.

==== Decline ====
After the death of its founder and charismatic leader, Sardar Sewa Singh Thikriwala in 1935, and also due to its loss of Akali patronage, the movement lost much of its momentum. The organization also became influenced by Marxism from that point on due to the increasingly Marxist-leanings of two of its leaders: Bhagwan Singh Longowalia and Jagir Singh Joga. The organization further declined due to factionalism and infighting between Communist-inclined rural folk and Congress-inclined urbanites from within its ranks. Also, the Akali Dal had stopped interfering with the internal matters of the princely states, and thus did not offer support to the organization like they previously did. In 1937, Kisan Committees were established throughout villages. During an incident between tenants and landlords that occurred at Hakima Wala village on 25 November 1937, police shot at the tenants, leading to two deaths and leaving nine injured. The sixth AISPC conference was held in Ludhiana in February 1939, with it being organized by the Punjab Riyasti Praja Mandal. During the conference, Nehru spoke about the importance of civil rights for the inhabitants of the princely states and iterated that it was a goal that the princely states be brought under responsible administrations. Also in 1939, most of the leaders of the Riyasti Praja Mandal were incarcerated but the work of the body continued through the Peasants and Tenants Committees that had been set up the same year.

In 1945, communists were thrown out of the Indian National Congress (INC), thus the AISPC set in motion a regional council for the Punjabi princely states, which led to the fracturing of the Punjab Riyasti Praja Mandal into three factions:

- Akali-faction: led by Master Tara Singh, Pritam Singh Gojran, and Jagir Singh Phaguwalia
- Congress-faction: led by Brish Bhan
- Communist-faction: led by Jagir Singh Joga, Master Hari Singh, Harnam Singh Chamak

The Congress faction of the Praja Mandal had Brish Bhan becoming the chairman and Harbans Lal becoming the general secretary, which led to the leadership of the faction being given to urbanite Hindus, mostly businessmen and lawyers. Under this scheme, the fight for constitutional and administrative reforms in the princely states carried on.

The organization lapsed after the creation of PEPSU out of the former princely states of Patiala, Nabha, Jind, Malerkotla, Faridkot, Kapurthala, Nalagarh, and Kalsia, and it was replaced by the PEPSU Pradesh Congress. The Punjab state government in India claims to have lost documentation and records relating to the Punjabi Praja Mandal movement.

=== Phases of Activism ===
- First phase (1928–1938): characterized as a rural movement associated with the Akalis and mainly focused on a mission against Maharaja Bhupinder Singh of Patiala State.
- Second phase (1938–1948): more influenced by Communism and focused on supporting the landless tenants against the landowning-class. An influx of urbanite Hindu members.

=== Patiala State ===
Patiala State arrested S. Sewa Singh on flimsy charges of theft, which led to unrest within the state. In actuality, S. Sewa Singh was arrested due to his criticism of the ruling Patiala prince. Baba Kharak Singh attempted to get Sardar Sewa Singh Thikriwala released whilst touring the princely state and criticizing its government, and Sardar Sewa Singh went on a hunger strike. Many Akali workers were arrested by the state authorities, with Master Tara Singh campaigning against the ruling Patiala monarch, with the Riyasti Praja Mandal intensifying its movement. Eventually due to this pressure on the Patiala officials, Sardar Sewa Singh and forty other Akalis were released from Patiala Central Jail on 24 August 1929, and during the first regular session of the Punjab Riyasati Praja Mandal that was convened at Lahore on 27 December 1929, Maharaja Bhupinder Singh was again heavily criticized by the body in its resolution. In the spring of 1929, a memorandum called the Indictment of Patiala, signed by ten persons, was addressed to the Viceroy of India outlining the misrule of the ruling monarch of Patiala and his officials, which the AISPC (having been provided a copy of the report) conducted their own inquiry, known as the Patiala Inquiry Committee, and found the Patiala ruler guilty of most of the accusations in a February 1930 report. However, a separate, British inquiry led by J. A. O. Fitzpatrick found the Patiala maharaja not-guilty. Maharaja Bhupinder Singh, acting as the chancellor of the Chamber of Princes, became the sole representative of the Indian princes at the first Round Table Conference in London. This prompted the Riyasti Praja Mandal to step-up their mission against him, with S. Sewa Singh Thikriwala personally reprimanding the Patiala ruler and demanding his removal from the throne at the organization's Ludhiana conference on 11 October 1930. In response to S. Sewa Singh's accusations, the Patiala officials arrested and jailed S. Sewa Singh Thikiriwala but he was released after a few months even though he had been sentenced to ten years in jail.

Maharaja Bhupinder Singh of Patiala, realizing the increasing popularity of the movement, began to negotiate with the agitators starting in 1931. However, negotiations collapsed when S. Sewa Singh demanded an elected assembly for Patiala State. At the third Punjab Riyasti Praja Mandal conference that was supposed to have been held in Shimla in July 1931, S. Sewa Singh Thikriwala met with Mahatma Gandhi to discuss the issue regarding Patiala State during that time. Maharaja Bhupinder Singh was again strongly rebuked at the third conference. In 1931, the Patiala government issued a hidāyat (instruction) of 1988 Bk. (1931 C.E.) that prohibited any kind of political activism in the princely state as a crack-down measure on the Riyasti Praja Mandal. In 1932–33, a second memorandum was brought out by the organization against Maharaja Bhupinder Singh and it staged protests at Amritsar and Delhi against the ruler. In a meeting of the Riyasti Praja Mandal leaders in mid-1933, it was decided that jathas(groups) would be sent to the Lahore Political Agent's office. This move led to the banning of S. Sewa Singh Thikriwala from the districts of Lahore and Amritsar for two months. S. Sewa Singh was arrested on 25 August 1933 by the Patiala State police for violating the earlier 1931 hidāyat that had banned political activity within the state of Patiala. Sardar Sewa Singh Thikriwala refused to defend himself and the outcome of the subsequent Khudiala Akali Conference case resulted in him being sentenced to three (or six?) years of prison and a 500 rupee fine.S. Sewa Singh went on another hunger strike to protest the poor treatment he was receiving while at Patiala Jail and died on 19 January 1935 in solitary-confinement at the jail. In 1936, the Patiala ruler signed a deal with the Akali leader Master Tara Singh, leading to the release of Akali members (including Bhagwan Singh and twenty-five other Praja Mandal workers) held in Patiala jails but this also led to the decline of the Praja Mandal as they lost Akali support. However, prominent Praja Mandal figures, such as Harchand Singh Jeji, Bhagwan Singh Longowal, and Jagir Singh Joga did not agree with the deal that Tara Singh had signed with Bhupinder Singh. Therefore, those Praja Mandal leaders continued their anti-Bhupinder Singh activities until the Patiala ruler died in 1938. The successive ruler of Patiala, Maharaja Yadavindra Singh, married the daughter of a Praja Mandal leader, Harchand Singh Jeji, thus relations between one faction of the Praja Mandal and Patiala State improved thereafter.

=== Jind State ===
The organization launched a protest movement against the enhancement of land-revenue and against the practice of begār (forced free-labour).

=== Faridkot State ===
Proponents of the independence movement were tortured by the police of Faridkot State. Also, the local farmers of Faridkot State were banned from selling their produce at other mandis. The landlord class was heavily exploited by the state despite the state's rich treasury. Also, the cost for attending educational institutions within the state was high. Due to these factors, a Praja Mandal struggle took place in Faridkot State as well, with a severe agitation occurring in the state in 1946. The 1946 agitation was led by Giani Zail Singh and the agitation was at its highest point when Nehru visited the area on 27 May 1946.

=== Malerkotla State ===
The organization created a document called the Malerkotla Indictment which criticized the state's ruler and its administration.

=== Kapurthala State ===
The organization ordered the ending of oppressive taxes and advocated for the appointment of a trustworthy government.

=== Kalsia State ===
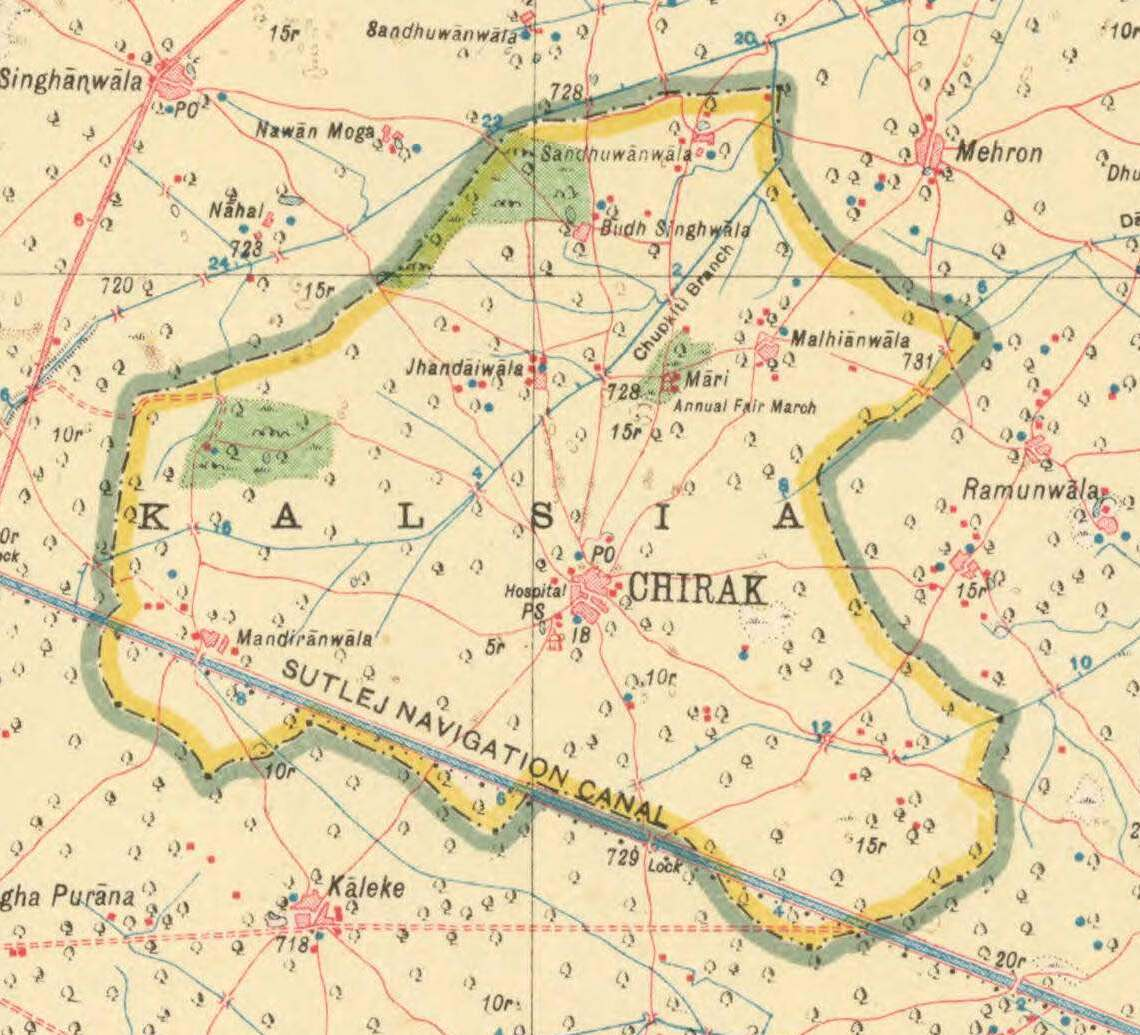
Chirak exclave of Kalsia State surrounded by Moga tehsil, Survey of India geographical block-map for 44 N NW Ferozepore (1921)

In September 1938, agrarian protestors in parts of present-day Moga district under Kalsia State back then were protesting against excessive land revenue, requesting a reduction in the same, when they were lathi-charged by the state police. The cattle fairs at Chirak village (that was held between 11 September 1938 and 20 September 1938) and Mari village were boycotted by the farmers' leaders, leading to a loss of revenue for Kalsia State. This movement was known as the "Kalsia agitation" and around 125 were arrested and held at a jail in Chhachroli, in poor conditions. Moga was the centre of the agitation.

== List of annual sessions or conferences ==
- First: Lahore on 27 December 1929 - S. Sewa Singh and Bhagwan Singh both re-elected as president and general-secretary. An anti-Bhupinder Singh resolution of Patiala was adopted.
- Second: Ludhiana on 11 October 1930 - Views critical of the Patiala ruler and his administration were shared, and Bhupinder Singh's removal from the throne of Patiala was a demand.
- Third: Shimla in July 1931 - The third annual session was also critical of the Patiala state officials and ruler, and again Bhupinder Singh's deposition was demanded.
- Fourth: Delhi in April 1933

== Literature ==
The organization published two periodicals in different languages: Riasti Dunia (in Urdu) and Desh Dardi (in Punjabi).

== Bibliography ==
- Thandi, S.S. (2022). Agrarian Reform and Farmer Resistance in Punjab: Mobilization and Resilience. Taylor & Francis. ISBN 978-1-000-81630-3.
- Mukherjee, M. (2004). Peasants in India's Non-Violent Revolution: Practice and Theory. SAGE Series in Modern Indian History. SAGE Publications. ISBN 978-0-7619-9686-6.
- Copland, I. (2005). State, Community and Neighbourhood in Princely North India, c. 1900-1950. Palgrave Macmillan UK. ISBN 978-0-230-00598-3.
- Akins, H. (2023). Conquering the maharajas: India's princely states and the end of empire, 1930–50. Studies in Imperialism. Manchester University Press. ISBN 978-1-5261-6784-2.
