= Vijaipura =

Village in Rajasthan, India

- Village
- Sikar Rajasthan 332041
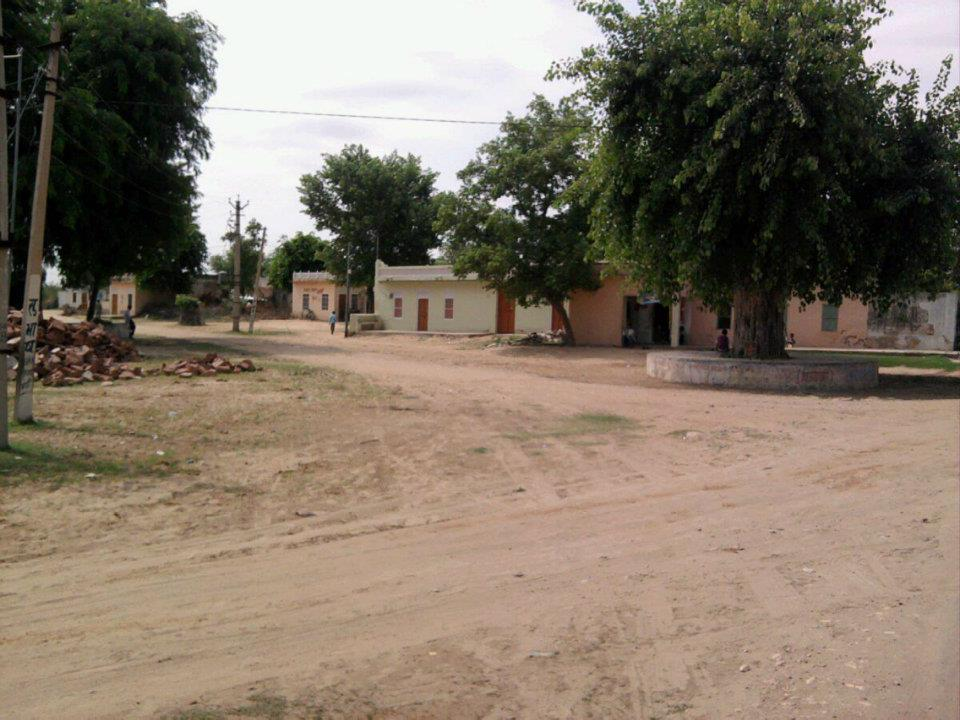
- Coordinates: 27.63187°N 74.94165°E
- Country: India
- Founded: 1590
- Incorporated: 1806

Government
  - Type: Gram Panchayat
  - Director: Manohari Devi Mali (Indian National Congress)

Area
  - Total: 12.03 km^{2} (4.64 sq mi)
- Elevation: 360 m (1,181 ft)

Population (2011)
  - Total: 4,230
- Time zone: UTC+5:30 (IST)
- Postal code: 332041
- ISO 3166 code: RJ-IN
- Website: Facebook

Vijaipura is a village in the Sikar district of Rajasthan, India. It is located on the Sikar-Salasar road, to the north of Sewad Bari, 21 kilometres (13 mi) from the city of Sikar and 126 kilometres (78 mi) from the state capital Jaipur.

== Population ==
At the 2011 census Vijaipura had a total of 330 families residing. The Vijaipura village has population of 1808 of which 913 are males while 895 are females. In the village population of children with age 0-6 is 206 which makes up 11.39% of total population of village. Average Sex Ratio of Vijaipura village is 980 which is higher than Rajasthan state average of 928. Child Sex Ratio for the Vijaipura as per census is 890, higher than Rajasthan average of 888. As per constitution of India and Panchyati Raaj Act, Vijaipura village is administrated by Sarpanch (Head of Village) who is elected representative of village. The population is mostly Jat, Jat is most Chahar tribe, their addition Godara, Bijarnia, Seshma, publicity, Buldk, the tribe Mondiwal etc., besides Brahman, Jogi, Naik, Rohln, Saini, are Jangir people also live in the village. Vijaipura Data: Schedule Caste (SC) constitutes 16.26% of total population in Vijaipura village. The village Vijaipura currently doesn't have any Schedule Tribe (ST) population.

Particulars	Total	Male	Female
No of House	330	-	-
Population	1808	913	895
Child	206	109	97
Schedule Caste	294	149	145
Schedule Tribe	0	0	0
Literacy	72.10%	86.82%	57.27%
Total Worker	952	487	465
Main Worker	377	0	0
Marginal Worker	575	137	438

== Economy ==
In Vijaipura village out of total population, 952 were engaged in work activities. 39.60% of workers describe their work as Main Work (Employment or Earning more than six months) while 60.40% were involved in Marginal activity providing livelihood for less than 6 months. Of 952 workers engaged in Main Work, 286 were cultivators (owner or co-owner) while 5 were Agricultural laborers.

== Administrative divisions ==
The village has government school, government dispensary, Aanganbadi office, the public is well managed by the state government, rural drinking water wells in the village. Village Development Committee in collaboration operate Gausala in the villages of Thakurji, Janaki Vallabhjee, Bhairuji, Gogaji, Ramdev, etc. There is Dewatao the temple, built in the west of the village of Balaaji temple "Balaaji who Nim" is quite well known, balaji ki dhani is a spiritual place which situated sewad vijaypura road there are a famous balaji mandir the village director is chosen after every five years under The State Election Commission of Rajasthan.

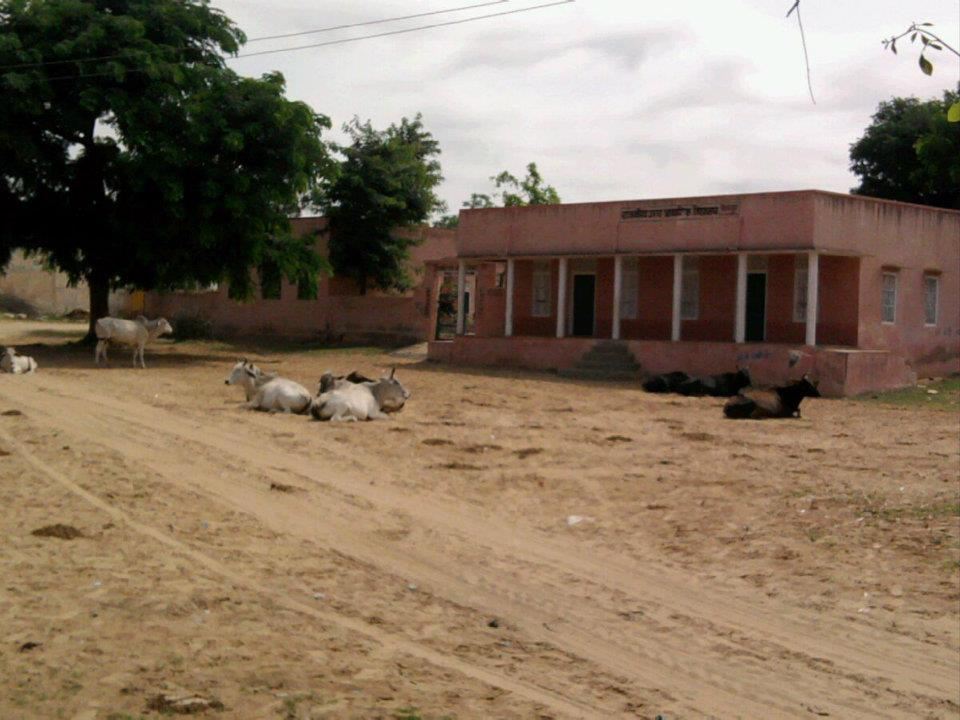
Govt School of Vijaipura Established January 1965

Directors	Years
Manohari Devi Mali	2020
Monika Devi Bagria	2015
Parmeshwari Devi Chahar	2010
Bhanwer Lal Rohlan	2005
Chandri Devi chahar	2000
Sukhdeva Ram Bagria	1995
Laxman Singh Chahar	1988
Bhana Ram Mali	1982
Bagha Ram Sheshma	1977
Mohan Lal Bagria	1971
Mohan Lal Bagria	1965
Nathu Ram	1960

== Transport ==
Roads connect Vijaipura to nearby villages. It is directly connected to Sikar Headquarter through Sikar - Salasar highway. The village has the direct bus services to Sikar, Salasar and Laxmangarh and Dhodh. Most of people they have two-wheeler transport and own cars.

== Education ==
The village's three schools are Arvind Shikshan Sansthan, Rajeev Gandhi Primary school and Govt School. Vijaipura village has higher literacy rate compared to Rajasthan. In 2011, literacy rate of Vijaipura village was 72.10% compared to 66.11% of Rajasthan. In Vijaipura Male literacy stands at 86.82% while female literacy rate was 57.27%. After 1995 the village has 100% literacy rate of boys and girls.

The village GP committee for the development works in schools and village.

== Agriculture ==
There are about 250 private wells and tube wells, Kharif and Rabi crops are sown, mainly millet, green gram, moth, guar, sesame, peanuts, wheat, barley, gram, mustard, mustard, fenugreek, cumin crop etc. are in abundance, Skrkandi, onions and other vegetables are also grown. Saras Dairy plant in the village recently also imposed, in the village dairy cattle, buffalo, cows, goats, etc. are a significant quantity court, camel, ox, horse, sheep, etc. are reared.

== Sports ==
"Vijay Cricket Club" a sports club organizes all kind of sports in village. It was established in 1994 by member of Vijay Cricket Club.
