= Harsha Chhina =

Harshe Chhina
- town
- Location in Punjab, India
- Coordinates: 31.745329°N 74.782980°E
- Country: India
- State: Punjab

Languages
  - Official: Punjabi
- Time zone: UTC+5:30 (IST)

Harsha Chhina is a village in the state of Punjab, India, three kilometers from Sri Guru Ram Dass Jee International Airport, Amritsar, on Ajnala Road. Harse is an Urdu word which means three villages (Uchla Quila, Vichla Quila, and Sabajpura). It is one of biggest villages in Ajnala and Rajasansi Constituency. It has a population of about 6,500. Until 1968 the village had one Panchayat and thereafter each sub village got respective new Panchayats. However, now there is another sub village Kukranwala with independent panchayat that has evolved from this village. Harsha Chhina, previously under Block Development Office Chogawan, has now itself become a new Block Development Office, situated in Kukranwala. Harsha Chhina is also referred as Chhine The Wale, because there used to be an ancient, huge and tall mountain-like structure known as The in Punjabi, situated about half a kilometre west of Vichla Quila. This was visible from surrounding villages in an approximately 10-kilometre radius. This prominent feature, which existed until the late 1990s, has disappeared, as it has been leveled and illegally occupied by the neighbouring farmers.

== Harsha Chhina Mogha Morcha: revolution against British Empire ==
The Harse Chhina Mogha Morcha was an agrarian revolt in Punjab, that took place 1946–1947. The campaign was launched in 1946, under the leadership of the Communist Party. The movement had been launched in response to a decision from the Punjab Government to decrease the supply of water irrigation to farmers, by remodelling the moghas (canal outlets). The campaign was headed by Comrade Achhar Singh Chhina, Sohan Singh Josh, Mohan Singh Batth, Baba Karam Singh Cheema, Jagbir Singh Chhina, and Gurdial Singh Dhillon. During the campaign, a few leaders and 950 protesting peasants were arrested by police and detained in Lahore jail for three months.

As a result of this movement an all party-negotiation was held with the Revenue Minister and the government official on providing more farming water to the agriculturalists, as per the previous agreement between the farmers and government. In the end the government gave in to the demands of the movement.

The participants of the Harsha Chhina Mogha Morcha struggle are recognized as freedom fighters by the Indian government and are entitled to freedom fighter pensions from the Freedom Fighters and Rehabilitation Division.

== Prominent persons ==
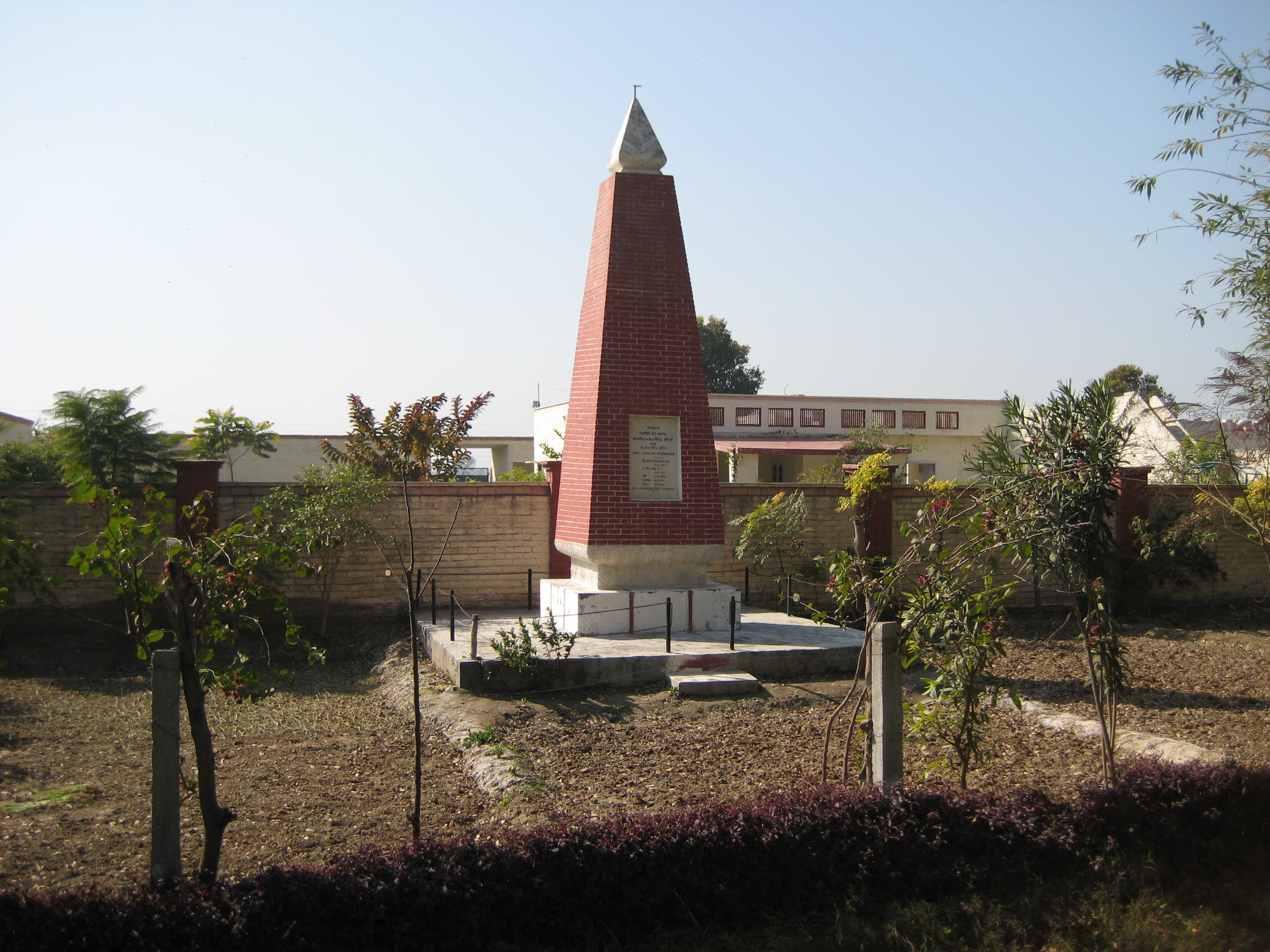
Monument dedicated to Comrade Achhar Singh Chhina

- Comrade Achhar Singh Chhina, a freedom fighter, born October 1899 in the village Harsha Chhina.
- Arpinder Singh, a triple jump athlete and medalist in international compitions

== Schools and sports club ==
- Comrade Achhar Singh Chhina Sr. Sec School
- Comrade Achhar Singh Chhina Sports and Educational Club

== Population ==
- Total: 6,571
- Male: 3,519
- Female: 3,052
