= Harse Chhina Mogha Morcha =

1946 agrarian revolt in Harsha Chhina, Punjab, India

The Harsha Chhina Mogha Morcha was an agrarian revolt in Harsha Chhina, Punjab, India, that took place in 1946 under the leadership of the Communist Party of India. Harsha Chhina is a village near RajaSansi Airport, Amritsar.The Morcha started in response to a decision taken by the British Government to decrease the supply of irrigation water to farmers by remodelling the moghas (canal outlets). The Morcha was headed by Comrade Achhar Singh Chhina, Sohan Singh Josh, Mohan Singh Baath, Baba Karam Singh Cheema, Jagbir Singh Chhina, and Gurdial Singh Tapiala. On the afternoon of 16 July 1946, Achhar Singh Chhina led a Jatha of 15 members from Harcha Chhina Village. On his shoulders he carried an Iron Kahi (An agriculture tool/equipment). The declared aim was to remove one of the existing outlets placed by the canal department and substitute it with the bigger outlet carried by the Jatha. The Jatha, whose members carried their respective party flags, proceeded toward the Canal distributary, followed by the big crowd. Before they could reach the canal, the police stepped in, arrested them and whisked them away to Amritsar. The pattern was repeated on subsequent days as well. During this movement 950 freedom fighters were arrested by police and detained in Lahore jail for three months.

As a result of this movement an all party-negotiation was held with the Revenue Minister and government officials on providing more farming water to the agriculturalists as per the previous agreement between the farmers and government. At the end, British government agreed to the demands of the freedom fighters.

The participants of the Harsha Chhina Mogha Morcha struggle are recognized as freedom fighters by the Indian government and are entitled to freedom fighter pensions from the Freedom Fighters and Rehabilitation Division.

Harse Chhina Morcha Protest Photogallery https://www.facebook.com/media/set/?vanity=udeekmagazine&set=a.1715819181967804
