= 2013 Asian Athletics Championships – Men's triple jump =

The men's triple jump at the 2013 Asian Athletics Championships was held at the Shree Shiv Chhatrapati Sports Complex on 7 July.

== Results ==
Rank	Name	Nationality	#1	#2	#3	#4	#5	#6	Result	Notes
1st place, gold medalist(s)	Cao Shuo	China	15.71	16.19	x	16.77	x	x	16.77	
2nd place, silver medalist(s)	Renjith Maheshwary	India	15.85	16.16	16.60	15.81	16.76w	16.51	16.76w	
3rd place, bronze medalist(s)	Arpinder Singh	India	15.72	x	15.07	16.51	16.58	x	16.58	
4	Roman Valiyev	Kazakhstan	16.42	x	16.35	16.55	x	x	16.55	
5	Rashid Al-Mannai	Qatar	x	15.91	15.98	15.59	x	x	15.98	
6	Mohammed Salahuddin	India	15.24	15.49	15.71	15.63	15.44	13.88	15.71	
7	Mohamed Al-Shabi	Bahrain	15.28	15.10	15.44	15.53	15.58	15.47	15.58	
8	Chamara Nuwan Gamage	Sri Lanka	15.31	x	x	15.17	x	x	15.31	
9	Abdullah Al-Youhah	Kuwait	15.17	15.15	x				15.17	
10	Talal Al-Salem	Kuwait	14.47	14.26	x				14.47	
	Zhang Yaoguang	China							DNS	
