= Khun khun =

Khun Khun
- Village
- Nickname: Khunkhani
- Location in Punjab, India Khun Khun (India)
- Coordinates: 31.211150°N 75.534007°E
- Country: India
- State: Punjab
- District: Jalandhar
- Talukas: Jalandhar I

Area
  - Total: 287 ha (710 acres)
  - Agricultural: 265 ha (650 acres)
  - Non-Agricultural: 22 ha (54 acres)

Population (2009)
  - Total: 750
  - Density: 260/km^{2} (680/sq mi)

Languages
  - Official: Punjabi
  - Regional: Punjabi (Doabi)
- Time zone: UTC+5:30 (IST)
- PIN: 144028
- Telephone code: 0181
- Vehicle registration: PB- 08
- Nearest city: Nakodar

Khun Khun is a small village in the Jalandhar I tehsil (subdistrict) of the Jalandhar district in the Indian state of Punjab.

== STD code ==
Khunkhani's STD code is 01821 and post code is 144028.
