= Bajuha Kalan =

- village
- Nickname: Bajuha
- Location in Punjab, India Bajuha Kalan (India)
- Coordinates: 31.199725°N 75.587322°E
- Country: India
- State: Punjab
- District: Jalandhar
- Talukas: Nakodar

Languages
  - Official: Punjabi
  - Regional: Punjabi
- Time zone: UTC+5:30 (IST)
- Telephone code: 0181
- Vehicle registration: PB- 08
- Nearest city: Nakodar

Bajuha kalan is a village in Nakodar. Nakodar is a tehsil in the city, Jalandhar of the Indian state of Punjab. Kalan is Persian language word which means Big and Khurd is Persian word which means small when two villages have same name then it is distinguished as Kalan means Big and Khurd means Small with Village Name.

== STD code ==
Bajuha Kalan's STD code is 01821.
