= Chak Kalan =

- village
- Nickname: Bada Chak
- Location in Punjab, India Chak Kalan (India)
- Coordinates: 31.177349°N 75.533881°E
- Country: India
- State: Punjab
- District: Jalandhar
- Talukas: Nakodar

Languages
  - Official: Punjabi
  - Regional: Punjabi
- Time zone: UTC+5:30 (IST)
- PIN: 144042
- Telephone code: 01821
- Vehicle registration: PB- 33
- Jalandhar: Nakodar

Chak Kalan is a village in Nakodar. Nakodar is a tehsil in the city Jalandhar of Indian state of Punjab. Kalan is a Persian word which means “Big” and Khurd is a Persian word which means small. When two villages have the same name they are distinguished with Kalan and Khurd respectively.

== STD code ==
Chak Kalan's STD code is 01821 and post code is 144042.
