= Chak Khurd =

- village
- Nickname: Chota Chak
- Location in Punjab, India Chak Khurd (India)
- Coordinates: 31.182975°N 75.535732°E
- Country: India
- State: Punjab
- District: Jalandhar
- Talukas: Nakodar

Languages
  - Official: Punjabi
  - Regional: Punjabi
- Time zone: UTC+5:30 (IST)
- PIN: 144042
- Telephone code: 0181
- Vehicle registration: PB- 08
- Nearest city: Nakodar

Chak Khurd is a small village in Nakodar. Nakodar is a tehsil in the city Jalandhar of Indian state of Punjab. Kalan is a Persian word meaning “Big” and Khurd is a Persian word meaning small. When two villages have the same name then they are distinguished as Kalan and Khurd respectively.

== STD code ==
Chak Khurd's STD code is 01821 and post code is 144042.
