= Gura, Nakodar =

Gurha
- village
- Nickname: Gurha
- Location in Punjab, India Gurha (India)
- Coordinates: 31.170128°N 75.552716°E
- Country: India
- State: Punjab
- District: Jalandhar
- Talukas: Nakodar

Languages
  - Official: Punjabi
  - Regional: Punjabi
- Time zone: UTC+5:30 (IST)
- Telephone code: 0181
- Vehicle registration: PB- 08
- Nearest city: Nakodar

Gura or Guda is a small village in Nakodar. Nakodar is a tehsil in the city Jalandhar of Indian state of Punjab.

== STD code ==
Gura's STD code is 01821.
