= Arpinder Singh =

Indian triple jumper (born 1992)

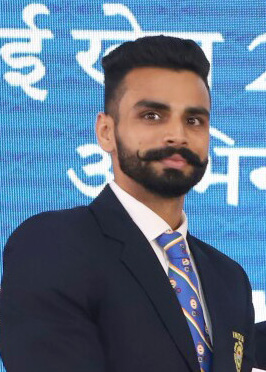
- Singh in 2018

Personal information
- Born: 30 December 1992 (age 33) Harsha Chhina, Punjab, India
- Height: 1.89 m (6 ft 2 in)

Sport
- Sport: Track and field
- Event: Triple jump

Achievements and titles
- Personal best: 17.17 m (2014)
Medal record
Men's athletics
Representing India
Continental Cup
Bronze medal – third place	2018 Ostrava	Triple jump
Commonwealth Games
Bronze medal – third place	2014 Glasgow	Triple jump
Asian Games
Gold medal – first place	2018 Jakarta	Triple jump
Asian Championships
Bronze medal – third place	2013 Pune	Triple jump
Asian Indoor Games
Gold medal – first place	2017 Ashgabat	Triple jump

Arpinder Singh (born 30 December 1992) is an Indian triple jumper. He was a gold medallist at the 2018 Asian Games and 2017 Asian Indoor Games. He also claimed a bronze medal at the 2014 Commonwealth Games.

== Career ==
In June 2014, Singh beat his previous best of 16.84 metres by jumping 17.17 metres at the 2014 National Inter-State Championships in Lucknow. In the process, he beat the national record previously held by Renjith Maheshwary and also secured a qualification for the 2014 Commonwealth Games where he won the bronze medal. The record was again broken by Maheshwary in 2016.

On 29 August 2018 which is celebrated as National Sports Day in India he won gold medal in triple jump event in 18th Asian games.

He covered the distance of 16.77 metres to bag the gold medal. He became the second Indian sportsperson to achieve this landmark. Before him Mohinder Singh Gill won gold medal in triple jump event in 1970 Bangkok Asian games event.
