= Sewad Bari =

Village in Rajasthan, India

Coordinates: 27.60°N 74.95°E

Sewad Bari or Sewad Badi is a small village in the Sikar district of Rajasthan, India. It is located on the Sikar-Salasar road, 21 kilometres (13 mi) from the city of Sikar and 126 kilometres (78 mi) from the state capital Jaipur. It is situated south of the neighbouring village of Vijaipura and north-west of Sewad Chhoti. Sewad Bari had a population of 3,326 in 2011.Sewad Bari village has higher literacy rate compared to Rajasthan. In 2011, literacy rate of Sewad Bari village was 72.23% compared to 66.11% of Rajasthan. In Sewad Bari Male literacy stands at 82.19% while female literacy rate was 61.94%. This village is administrated by Sarpanch(head of village) who is elected representative of people.
