= Harchowal =

Coordinates: 31°47′N 75°27′E

- Village
- Interactive map of Harchowal
- Country: India
- State: Punjab
- District: Gurdaspur
- Tehsil: Batala
- Region: Majha

Government
  - Type: Panchayat raj
  - Body: Gram panchayat

Area
  - Total: 957 ha (2,360 acres)

Population (2011)
  - Total: 5,291; 2,723/2,568 ♂/♀
  - Scheduled Castes: 77; 35/42 ♂/♀
  - Total Households: 973

Languages
  - Official: Punjabi
- Time zone: UTC+5:30 (IST)
- Postal code: 143527
- Telephone: 01871
- ISO 3166 code: IN-PB
- Vehicle registration: PB-18
- Website: gurdaspur.nic.in

Harchowal is a village in Batala in Gurdaspur district of Punjab State, India. It is located 26 kilometres (16 mi) from sub district headquarter, 30 kilometres (19 mi) from district headquarter and 6 kilometres (3.7 mi) from Sri Hargobindpur. The village is administrated by Sarpanch an elected representative of the village.

== Demography ==
As of 2011, the village has a total number of 973 houses and a population of 5291 of which 2723 are males while 2568 are females. According to the report published by Census India in 2011, out of the total population of the village 77 people are from Schedule Caste and the village does not have any Schedule Tribe population so far.

== See also ==
- List of villages in India
