= Mari Buchian =

Coordinates: 31°39′N 75°26′E

- Village
- Interactive map of Mari Buchian
- Country: India
- State: Punjab
- District: Gurdaspur
- Tehsil: Batala
- Region: Majha

Government
  - Type: Panchayat raj
  - Body: Gram panchayat

Area
  - Total: 2,100 ha (5,200 acres)

Population (2011)
  - Total: 5,311; 2,759/2,552 ♂/♀
  - Scheduled Castes: 416; 224/192 ♂/♀
  - Total Households: 1,050

Languages
  - Official: Punjabi
- Time zone: UTC+5:30 (IST)
- Telephone: 01871
- ISO 3166 code: IN-PB
- Vehicle registration: PB-18
- Website: gurdaspur.nic.in

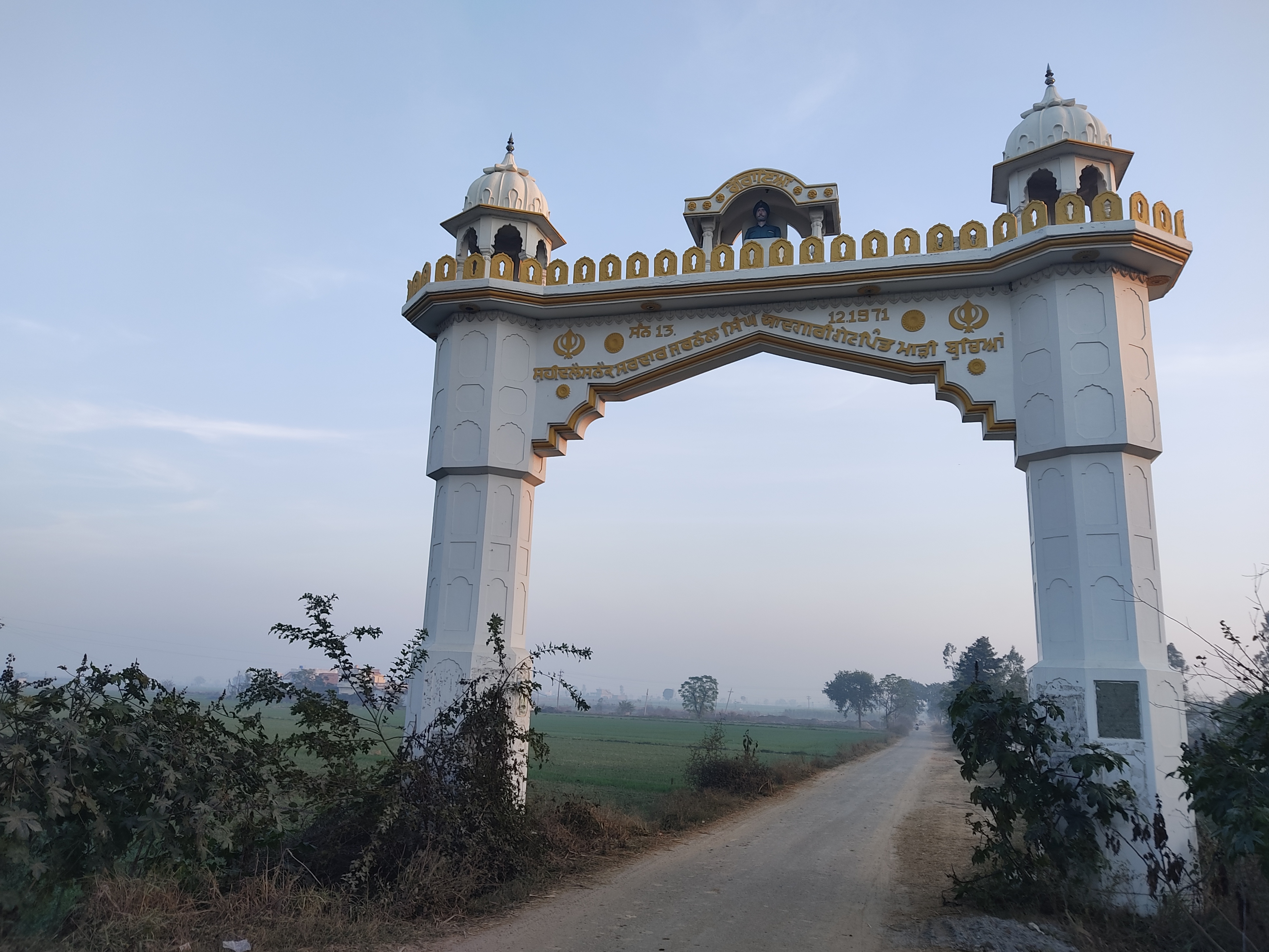
Main Entry Gate of Mari Buchian

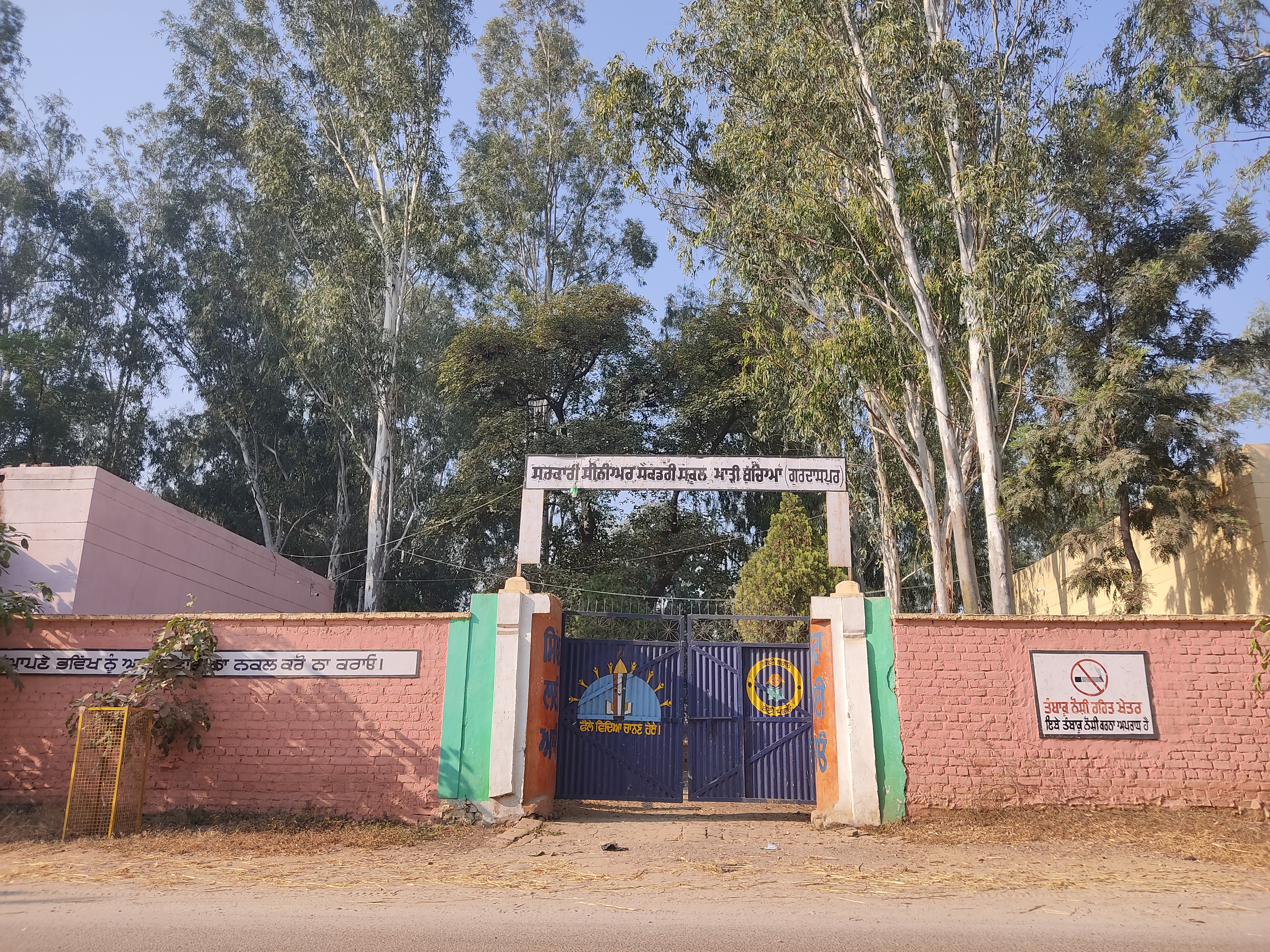
Government Senior Senior Secondary School, Mari Buchian

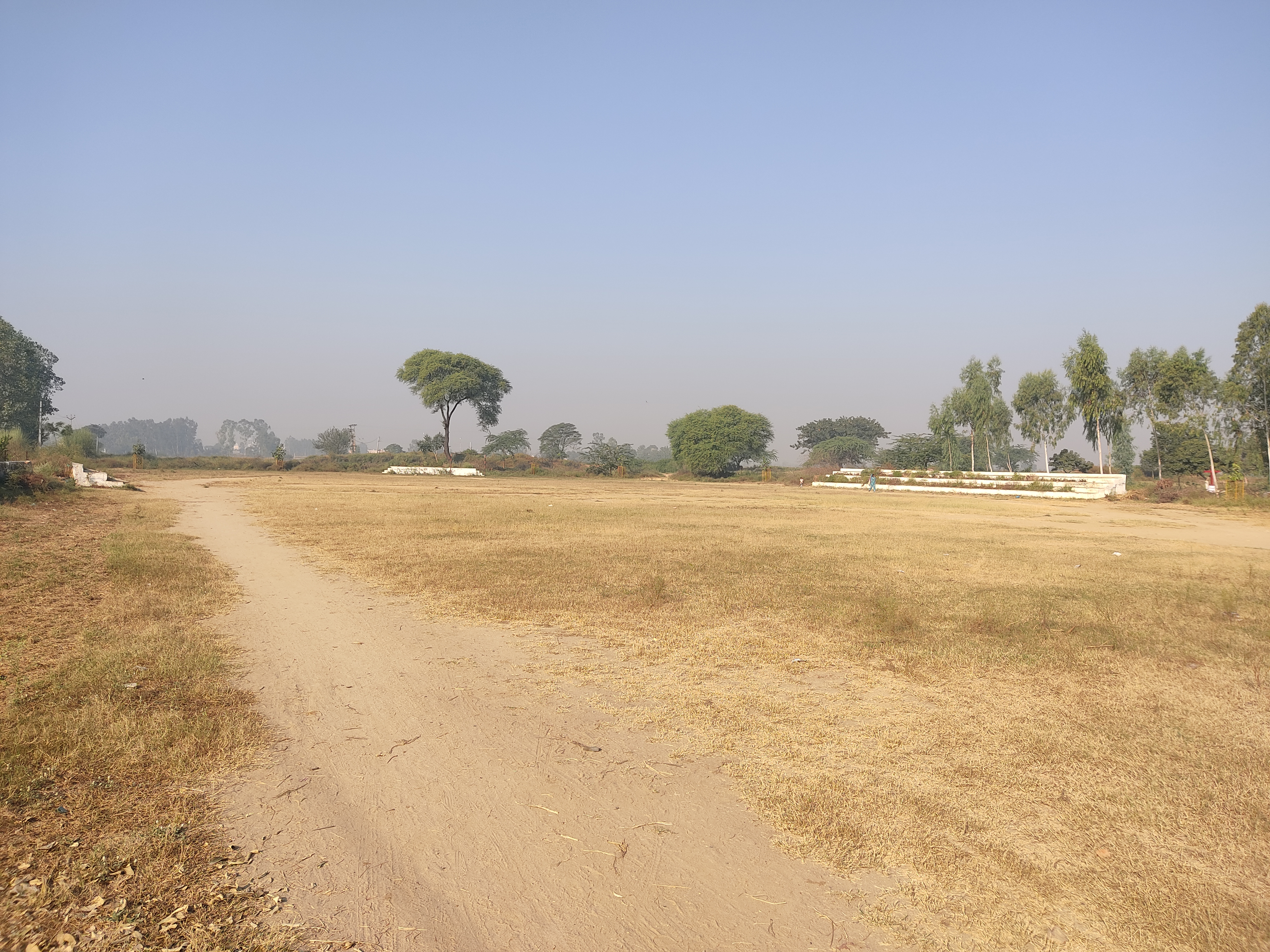
Playground of Mari Buchian

Mari Buchian is a village in Batala in Gurdaspur district of Punjab State, India. It is located 35 kilometres (22 mi) from sub district headquarter, 45 kilometres (28 mi) from district headquarter and 5 kilometres (3.1 mi) from Sri Hargobindpur. The village is administered by a Sarpanch who is an elected representative of the village.

== Demography ==
As of 2011, the village has a total number of 1050 houses and a population of 5311 of which 2759 are males while 2552 are females. According to the report published by Census India in 2011, out of the total population of the village 416 people are from Schedule Caste and the village does not have any Schedule Tribe population so far.

== Notable people ==
- Dr. Daljeet Singh Cheema- Former Education Minister of Punjab

== See also ==
- List of villages in India
