= Freedom Fighters and Rehabilitation Division =

Freedom Fighters & Rehabilitation Division, a division of the Ministry of Home Affairs of India, manages the Swathantra Sainik Samman Pension Scheme - a national pension scheme introduced in 1972 for Freedom Fighters (Swatantrata Sainiks) and their dependents. The division also handles rehabilitation assistance for refugees and migrants from Pakistan, Sri Lanka and Tibet. However, there was significant resistance to implementing the scheme. For example, it took 24 years of legal fighting for S. M. Shanmugam to finally receive his pension in August 2006.

== Details of scheme ==
=== Definition of eligible freedom fighters ===
The freedom fighters pension scheme was instituted in 1972. Eligible as freedom fighters are people who;

- had suffered an imprisonment of 6 months or more in connection with the freedom struggle (3 months in the case of women and SC/ST freedom fighters.).
- remained underground for six months or more.
- were interned in their homes or external from their district for six months or more.
- whose property was confiscated or attached and sold due to participation in the national freedom struggle.
- were permanently incapacitated during firing or lathi charge.
- lost government employments due to the participation in the freedom struggle.
- were awarded the punishment of 10 strokes of canning/flogging/whipping.

=== Eligible movements and mutinies for the pension ===
The following movements and mutinies are recognized by the central government of India for the purpose of the freedom fighters pensione scheme administered by the division:

1. Ambala Cantonment Army Revolt (1943)
2. Anti-Independent Travancore Movement
3. Aranya Satyagraha of Karnataka (1939–40)
4. Arya Samaj Movement in the erstwhile Hyderabad State (1947–48)
5. Border Camp Cases in erstwhile Hyderabad State (1947–48)
6. Chengannur Riot Case
7. Chauri Chaura incident (1922)
8. Dadara Nagar Haveli Movement.
9. Ghadar Movement
10. Goa Liberation Movement
11. Gurdwara Reform Movement (1920–25) (including: a) Taran Taran Morcha, Nankana Tragedy of February (1920), The Golden Temple Ke Affairs (Morcha Chabian Saheb), Guru ka Bagh Morcha, Babbar Akali Movement, Jaito Morcha, Bhai Pheru Morcha, The Sikh Conspiracy (Golden Temple) of 1924)
12. Harse Chhina Mogha Morcha (1946–47)
13. Hollwell monument removal movement (1940) by Subhas Chandra Bose at Calcutta
14. Indian Independence League (1942 to 1946)
15. Jhansi Regiment Case in Army (1940)
16. Kadakkal Riot Case
17. Kalipattanam Agitation (1941–42)
18. Kallara-Pangode Struggle
19. Karivelloor Movement
20. Kauvambai Movement
21. Kayyur incident
22. Khilafat Movement
23. Kirti Kisan Movement (1927)
24. Madurai Conspiracy Case (1945–47)
25. Malabar Special Police Strike (MSP Strike)
26. Merger with India movements in the former French and Portugueses possessions in India
27. Moplah Rebellion (1921–22)
28. Morazha Movement
29. Naujawan Bharat Sabha (1926–31)
30. Qissa Khwani massacre (Peshawar Kand) in which members of the Royal Garhwal Rifles took part
31. Praja Mandal Movement in the erstwhile Princely States (1939–49)
32. Punnapra-Vayalar uprising (1946)
33. Quit India Movement (1942)
34. Rani Jhansi Regiment and Azad Hind Fauj (Indian National Army) (1943–45)
35. Read Leaf Conspiracy Case (1931)
36. Royal Indian Navy Mutiny, 1946
37. Suez Canal Army Revolt in 1943
38. Vattiyoorkavu Conference

== See also ==
- Indian independence movement
- Indian National Army
- Pensions in India
