= Gurdial Singh Dhillon =

Indian politician (1915–1992)

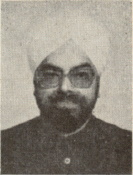

Minister for Agriculture
- In office 12 May 1986 – 14 February 1988
- Prime Minister: Rajiv Gandhi

5th Speaker of Lok Sabha
- In office 22 March 1971 – 1 December 1975
- Deputy: G.G. Swell
- Preceded by: himself
- Succeeded by: Bali Ram Bhagat
- In office 8 August 1969 – 19 March 1971
- Deputy: G.G. Swell
- Preceded by: Neelam Sanjiva Reddy
- Succeeded by: himself

Personal details
- Born: 6 August 1915 Amritsar, Punjab, British India
- Died: 23 March 1992 (aged 76) New Delhi, India
- Party: Indian National Congress
- Education: Punjab University Law College
- Occupation: Politician; Diplomat

Dr. Gurdial Singh Dhillon (6 August 1915 – 23 March 1992) was an Indian politician from the Indian National Congress party. He served as the Speaker of the Lok Sabha twice, President of the Inter-Parliamentary Union (1973–76) and Indian High Commissioner to Canada (1980–82).

== Early life ==
On 6 August 1915, Gurdial Singh Dhillon was born in the Panjwar, some 20 kilometres west of Amritsar city in Punjab into a Dhillon Jat family, He was descendant of Bhangi misl rulers. He studied at Khalsa College, Amritsar and Government College, Lahore before graduating in law from Punjab University Law College in Lahore. He played an active role in the Harse Chhina Mogha Morcha rebellion in 1947.

== Political career ==
Dhillon was a member of the Punjab Legislative Assembly (1952–1967), where he was its Deputy Speaker (1952–54) and its Speaker (1954–62). In 1967 he was first elected to the Lok Sabha, the lower House of the Indian Parliament representing Tarn Taran parliamentary constituency. He was elected from Firozpur in 1985.

Dhillon served two terms as Speaker of Lok Sabha (1969–71 and 1971–75) and was Minister of Agriculture in the Indian Government (1986–1988). Regarding his time in Parliament, his biography on the Lok Sabha website expresses the following:

A man of uncompromising principles, he considered the institution of Parliament to be the temple of democracy and as such had great respect for the House and its traditions and conventions. The rare ability to quickly assess the mood of the House and a pragmatic approach helped him discharge the onerous responsibility of the office of the Speaker of the Lok Sabha in a dignified way. Dhillon's election as the President of the Inter-Parliamentary Council of the IPU was at once a great honour for himself and also for the people and the Parliament of India.

With Kartar Singh, he co-authored a series of eight children's books in the early 1970s entitled 'Stories from Sikh History'.

Having undergone heart bypass surgery, Dr. Dhillon died at the All India Institute of Medical Sciences, New Delhi on 23 March 1992 following a heart attack.

== See also ==
- Harse Chhina Mogha Morcha
