= Ghagga =

- Town
- Location in Punjab, India Ghagga (India)
- Coordinates: 30.0208°N 76.1025°E
- Country: India
- State: Punjab
- District: Patiala

Population (2001)
  - Total: 8,212

Languages
  - Official: Punjabi
- Time zone: UTC+5:30 (IST)

Ghagga is a town and a municipal committee in Patiala district in the state of Punjab, India. It is located on the Patiala road SH10 and is very near to the border of Haryana. Ghagga is very closer to Ghaggar river. That river give the name of this town. It is famous for the Qila Ghagga Kothi that was owned by the erstwhile royal family of Patiala, which is now under the control of Punjab Police. Ghagga have Delhi Amritsar Katra Expressway (NE5) Bharatmala project's Second biggest Toll Plaza After Kalayat. Ghagga also famous for there's biggest Sports Stadium. Ghagga is well connect with Patiala, Samana, Dirba, Patran, Khanauri, Delhi, Amritsar, Katra, Bhawanigarh and Malerkotla with Well maintained Roads.

== Prominent people ==
Sardar Ridha Singh Ji Akali of Ghagga was the vice president of the Riyasat Prajamandal Party. Sardar Sewa Singh Thikriwala of Thikriwala, was the president. This party was a part of the freedom struggle and wanted equal rights for the common man.

At that time, the British and the monarchy had imposed a lot of restrictions against the people of Punjab. There was no freedom of movement on the roads, which connected the villages to the main towns and cities. The Maharaja, on the other hand used these roads for his hunting pursuits and other expeditions. This, and numerous other violations against the lot of the Punjabi people, led to the formation of the Riyasat Prajamandal Party, which demanded basic rights for the natives of Punjab.

Sardar Ridha Singh Ji Akali Pannu was actively involved in numerous activities for demanding basic rights for the common man in Punjab.

Dr. Kartar Singh Dang (Popularly known as "Papa Ji") was the lone doctor in this town from 1951 to 1992, served with dedication for more than 40 years helping out poor and needy. Master Hamir singh Ghagga [former minister] also belongs to this town

== Demographics ==
As of 2001 India census, Ghagga had a population of 25000. Males constitute 53% of the population and females 47%. Ghagga has an average literacy rate of 49%, lower than the national average of 59.5%: male literacy is 56%, and female literacy is 41%. In Ghagga, 15% of the population is under 6 years of age. Ghagga had many restaurants.
