= Ramrai =

Coordinates: 27°31′N 79°04′E

Ramrai is a village in Jind district of the state of Haryana, India, known as a holy place associated with lord Rama. It is located on the Jind-Hansi road, 9 kilometres (5.6 mi) west of Jind. Ramrai is a traditional south-west Yaksha of the Kurukshetra region.

There are various castes, living with brotherhood to each another The village's name derives from Rama's arrival. There is an old temple to Parashurama in the village.. Village Ramrai is basically famous for its swimming. A lot of national and state players comes from here in swimming. Notable people from the village include Chaudhary Dal Singh, the first Irrigation and Power Minister of Haryana, and Parminder Singh Dhull, the MLA for the Julana constituency of the Haryana Legislative Assembly for term 2009–2019 and Ravinder Singh Dhull who is State Spokesperson of Haryana Congress.
