= Baganwala, Jind =

Baganwala
- Village
- Location in Haryana, India Baganwala (India)
- Coordinates: 29°26′N 76°20′E
- Country: India
- State: Haryana
- District: Jind

Population
  - Total: 424

Languages
  - Official: Hindi
- Time zone: UTC+5:30 (IST)
- ISO 3166 code: IN-HR
- Vehicle registration: HR-31
- Coastline: 0 kilometres (0 mi)
- Nearest city: Jind
- Literacy: 87.00%
- Lok Sabha constituency: Sonipat
- Climate: hot & dry (Köppen)
- Avg. summer temperature: 45 °C (113 °F)
- Avg. winter temperature: 10 °C (50 °F)
- Website: haryana.gov.in

Baganwala is a village in Jind district of the state of Haryana, India. As of 2009, it consisted of 62 households, with a total population of 424. It is located 4 km from Ramrai village on a link road that connects to State Highway 12 from Jind to Hansi. The village has a co-educational school which was established in 1972. As of 2013, it had 42 students. The medium of instruction is Hindi.
