= Ravinder Singh Dhull =

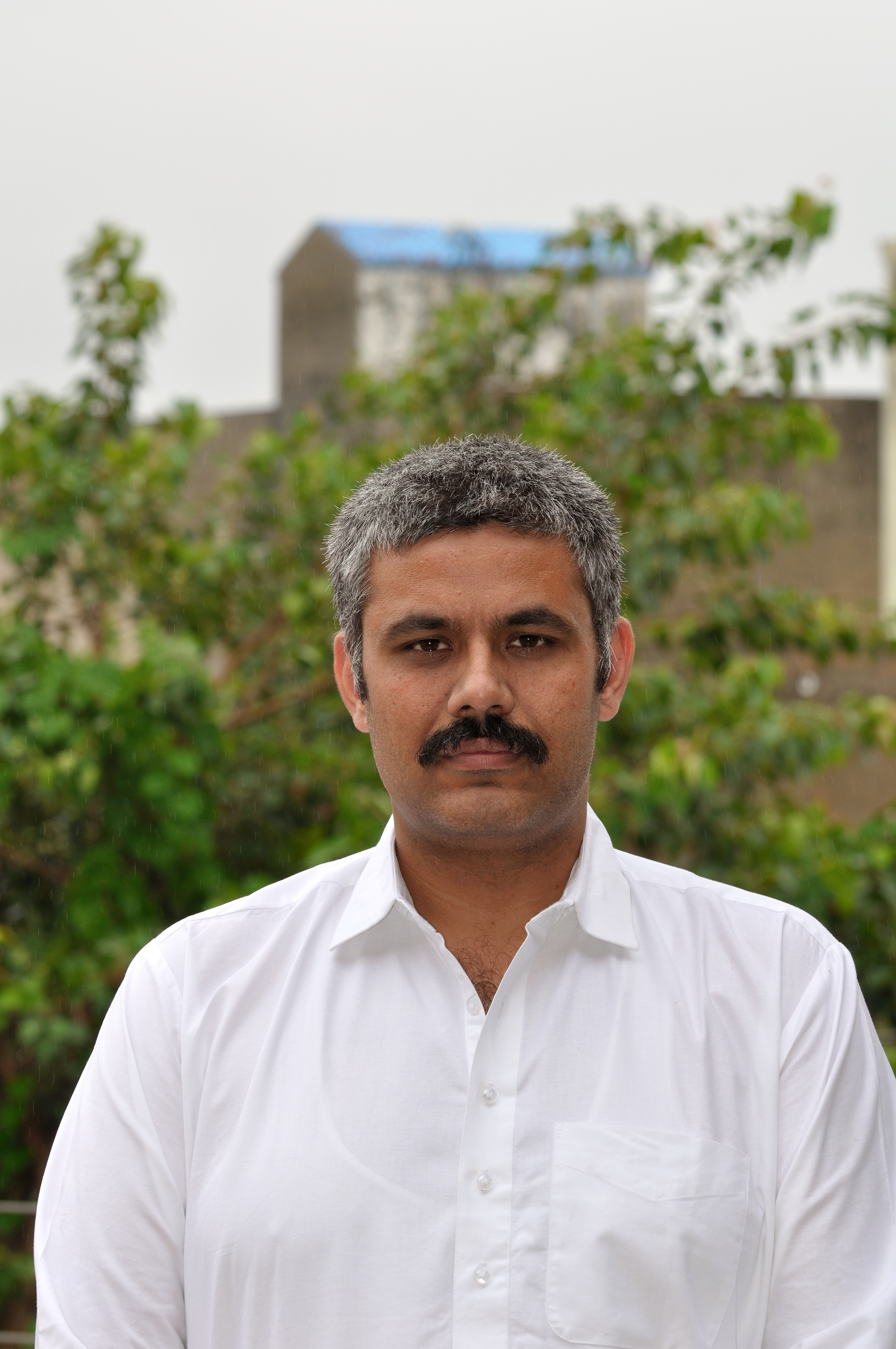
- Constituency: Julana

Personal details
- Born: Jind district, Haryana, India
- Party: Indian National Congress
- Spouse: Pooja
- Children: Ranvijay Singh
- Occupation: Agriculture
- Profession: Advocate
- Website: https://ravindersinghdhull.net

Ravinder Singh Dhull is a senior lawyer of the State of Haryana, India. He is currently serving as Legal Advisor to Congress Legislative Party, Haryana headed by Leader of Opposition Haryana Chaudhary Bhupinder Singh Hooda, National Media Penalist Indian National Congress and State Spokesperson Haryana Pradesh Congress Committee. He was appointed to the post on 9 June 2021. He is former Additional Advocate General for the State of Haryana and remained posted in the Punjab and Haryana High Court. He is former State Media Penalist for Bhartiya Janta Party, Haryana. Earlier he has served as State Spokesperson for the Indian National Lok Dal from August 2014 till June 2019. His father Parminder Singh Dhull served as two time Member of Legislative Assembly of Haryana from Julana constituency in Jind District. His grand father Chaudhary Dal Singh was a noted politician of the area and six time M.L.A. from District Jind. He resigned from the office of Advocate General Haryana during the 2020–2021 Indian farmers' protest on 20 October 2020 in protest of the controversial three farmer bills being passed by the Parliament of India.

== Education ==
He graduated at Government Post Graduate College, Jind studied Mathematics and Economics and did his Law from Punjab University, Chandigarh. He is Cyber Law Expert and did his Post Graduate Diploma from ICFAI University. He did his General Course on Intellectual Property Rights from World Intellectual Property Organization (WIPO). He Completed his master's in law from Maharishi Dayanand University, Rohtak in 2021.

== As social activist ==
He is founder of Centre for Socio Legal Research and Aid; an organization providing free legal aid to the needy in India. He has worked on the Right to Information law and is noted activist. He is known to have filed more than 3000 RTIs. He gained popularity as activist when he filed petition before the Punjab and Haryana High Court during the trial of Sant Gurmeet Ram Rahim Singh.

== As spokesperson ==
He is presently serving as National Media Penalist, Indian National Congress and State Spokesperson, Haryana Pradesh Congress Committee. Earlier he was appointed as Spokesperson by Indian National Lok Dal in August 2014. He continued as such till his resignation from party on 25.06.2019. Thereafter he was inducted as State Media Penalist by Bhartiya Janta Party Haryana and continued as such till his resignation on 20 October 2020. Since 2014 he has participated in various debates on national channels on important issues viz Demonetization, side effects of Demonetization, Commissionary Dissolution, Dengue Fever, On ill language of an MP, Jat Reservation, an MP questioning selection by HPSC and many other debates on channels viz Republic Bharat, Times Now, Network 10, Harkhabar News, India News Haryana, ABP News, ETV Haryana and Himachal, Zee News Haryana and Punjab, Zee News Salaam, Zee News Delhi and NCR, Janta TV, MH1 News, News X, Khabar Fast News, STV Haryana News, News 24, Sahara Samay etc.

== Associations ==
- Member, Asian Society of International Law
- Member, Indian Society of International Law
- Member, International Council of Jurists
