= Dal Singh =

Indian politician

Chaudhary Dal Singh

Member of Legislative Assembly
- Constituency: Jind and Julana
- In office 16 April 1952 – 30 April 1977

Personal details
- Born: 15 January 1915 Ramrai, Jind, Jind, Haryana, India
- Died: 21 January 1991 (aged 76) Jind
- Party: Indian National Congress
- Children: son Parminder Singh Dhull
- Parent: Chaudhary Ram Nath (father)
- Occupation: Politician
- Profession: Agriculturist

Chaudhary Dal Singh (1915–1991), popularly known as Khunda Jhota and Paani ka Baadal, was the first Irrigation and Power Minister of Haryana. He was involved in Haryana politics from 1952 to 1977, when he took unofficial retirement due to his bad health in 1966.

== Early life ==
During World War II, he served as a recruitment officer for the Indian National Army (INA) which was revitalized and led by Subhas Chandra Bose and was held as a prisoner of war in Germany and Italy. Additionally, he was an accomplished football player, winning the Indian Army Cavalry Tournament Medal in Lahore in 1939.

== As Military Man ==
Enrolled in the Army (2nd Royal Lancer) in March 1936. Went overseas as the leader of an advance party of the 3rd Motor Brigade in 1941. Taken prisoners of war by General Rommel's army on 8.1.1941 at ElMichill in Libya while acting as an intelligence NCO and remained a prisoner of war for 4 and a half Years in various countries of Europe. Released by General Paton of the U.S.A. on 28 April 1945. Worked as an interpreter for Russian and Indian Prisoners of War in the Medical Department in various camps. Opened Hindi School at Anna-Berg in Germany and Taught Hindi to about 1000 POW's. Worked as a recruiting officer of the Indian Legion ( I.N.A.) in Germany. Underwent officer's course at Frontier Warfare Army School Kakaul (Abbottabad) and stood first in the Army School in 1946.

== Travel to various Countries ==
Egypt, Saudi Arabia, Libya, Sicily, Italy, Germany, France, Switzerland, Belgium & England.

== Term as a Member of the Legislative Assembly ==
PEPSU LEGISLATIVE ASSEMBLY

1. Jind 16.04.1952 to 04.03.1953
2. Jind 26.03.1954 to 31.10.1956

PUNJAB LEGISLATIVE ASSEMBLY

1. Jind 06.11.1956 to 31.03.1957
2. Jind 26.01.1965 to 31.10.1966

HARYANA LEGISLATIVE ASSEMBLY

1. Jind 01.11.1966 to 28.02.1967
2. Julana 17.03.1967 to 21.11.1967
3. Julana 26.06.1970 to 20.01.1972
4. Jind 04.04.1972 to 30.04.1977

== Political Arrests ==
- Arrested by the Jind State Govt. while acting as Dictator of the Jind State merger movement, and a parallel Govt. at Dadri was formed under his direct supervision during the merger movement. The movement is popularly known as the Praja Mandal Andolan
- Arrested in 1970 at the time of the Chandigarh agitation by the Haryana Govt.
- Arrested on 13.02.1973 at the time of the teacher's agitation by the Haryana Govt.
- Arrested on 30.05.1973 under the order of the Haryana Govt. while going to address a civil liberty conference at Hansi (Hisar).
- Arrested on 05.05.1973 while leading a procession against the Electricity Cut at Jind by the Government of Haryana
- Arrested under MISA on 26.05.1975 and released on 11.05.1976 on health grounds.

== Administrative Experience ==
- Elected General Secretary of Jat High School Jind for terms 1946–47,47–48, 1948–49 and 1955– 56.
- President, District Congress Committee, Sangrur, 1954 to 1959.
- Vice Chairman, PEPSU, under the Developed Area Advisory Board.
- Elected Member Estimate Committee, PEPSU Vidhan Sabha for 1954–55, 1956–57.
- Elected member, Public Accounts Committee, PEPSU Vidhan Sabha for 1955–56.
- Member of the Public Relations and Grievances Committee of Sangrur district for the years 1954–57,64–66
- Elected first Chairman, Panchayat Samiti Jind 1961–65.
- Hony. Sub-registrar, Jind for 2 and a half years, 1962–64.
- Elected first Chairman of the Market Committee, Jind 1965–66.
- Member of the Civil Defence Committee, Punjab 1965.
- Irrigation and Power Minister, Haryana 01.11.1966 to 23.03.1967.
- Elected President H.P.C.C. ( O ) on 22.08.1971.

== As a Member of the Indian National Congress ==
- Elected President, Jind State Praja Mandal for the year 1947–48.
- Elected Member of the Electoral College of Punjab State of Bilaspur to elect members of the Constituent Assembly of India in 1947.
- Vice-President, PEPSU Youth Congress in 1949.
- President, District Congress Committee, Sangrur, 1954 to 1959.
- Convenor Bharat Sewak Samaj, Tehsil Jind 1956–57.
- Elected Member AICC in 1953.
- Member of the PCC from 1960 to 1969.
- Elected President of HPCC (O) on 22 August 1971.

== Other information ==
He was dragged into controversy when an Election petition was filed against him by Mr. Ghasi Ram in the Petition, the Hon'ble Supreme Court of India decided the matter in a case titled as Ghasi Ram vs Dal Singh reported in All India Reporter as AIR 1968 SC 1191. He was the first president of the Haryana unit of the Indian National Congress (Organisation).
