= Barodi =

Barodi may refer to:

- Barodi, Bhopal, a village in Bhopal, India
- Barodi, Jind, a village in Haryana, India
