= Julana Assembly constituency =

Legislative Assembly constituency in Haryana State, India

Coordinates: 29.12°N 76.4°E

Julana
- Constituency No. 34 for the Haryana Legislative Assembly

Constituency details
- Country: India
- Region: North India
- State: Haryana
- District: Jind
- Lok Sabha constituency: Sonipat
- Total electors: 1,85,565
- Reservation: None

Member of Legislative Assembly
- 15th Haryana Legislative Assembly
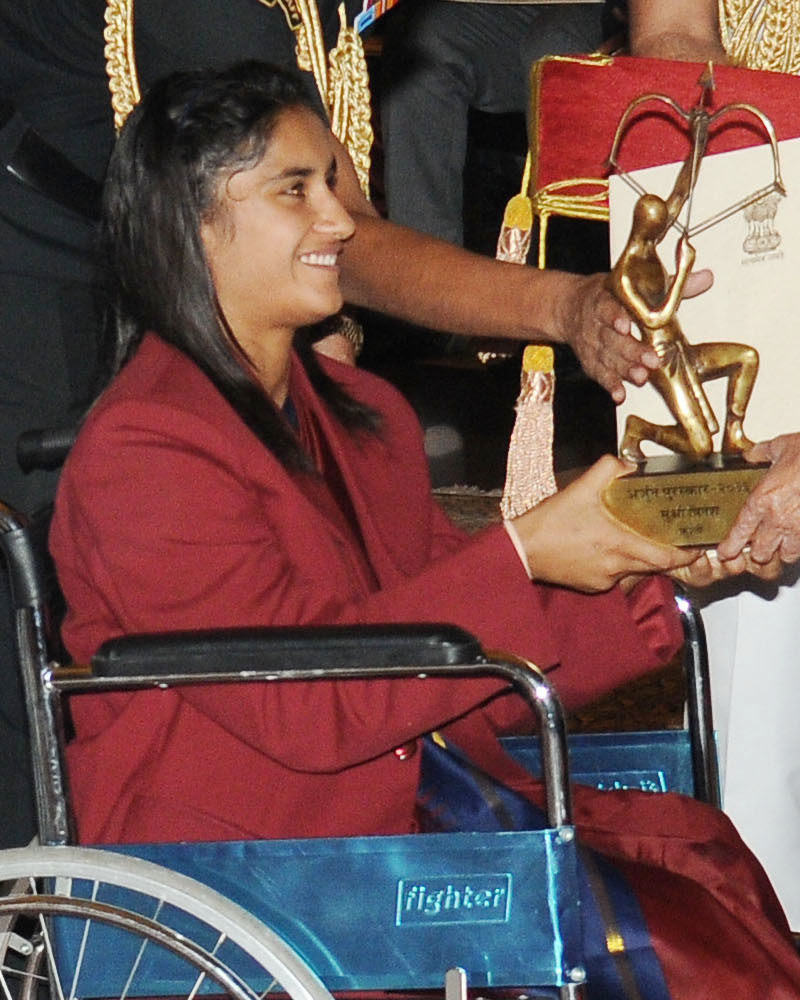
- Incumbent Vinesh Phogat
- Party: Indian National Congress
- Elected year: 2024

Julana Assembly constituency is one of the 90 Legislative Assembly constituencies of Haryana state in India. It is part of Jind district. Vinesh Phogat is the sitting MLA from this constituency, representing it in the 14th Legislative Assembly of Haryana.

== Members of the Legislative Assembly ==
Year	Member	Party
1967	Chaudhary Dal Singh	Indian National Congress
1968	Narain Singh Kataria	Swatantra Party
1970^	Chaudhary Dal Singh	Indian National Congress (O)
1972	Fateh Singh Ahlawat	Indian National Congress
1977	Zile Singh Malik	Janata Party
1982	Kulbir Singh Malik	Lokdal
1987	Kulbir Singh Malik	Lokdal
1991	Suraj Bhan Kajla	Janata Party
1996	Satya Narain Lathar	Haryana Vikas Party
2000	Sher Singh Sehrawat	Indian National Congress
2005	Sher Singh Sehrawat	Indian National Congress
2009	Parminder Singh Dhull	Indian National Lok Dal
2014	Parminder Singh Dhull	Indian National Lok Dal
2019	Amarjeet Dhanda	Jannayak Janta Party
2024	Vinesh Phogat	Indian National Congress

== Election results ==
=== Assembly Election 2024 ===
2024 Haryana Legislative Assembly election: Julana
Party	Candidate	Votes	%	±%
INC	Vinesh Phogat	65,080	46.86%	▲37.02
BJP	Yogesh Kumar	59,065	42.53%	▲12.66
INLD	Surender Lather	10,158	7.31%	New
JJP	Amarjeet Dhanda	2,477	1.78%	▼47.23
AAP	Kavita Rani	1,280	0.92%	▲0.16
NOTA	None of the Above	202	0.15%	New
Margin of victory		6,015	4.33%	▼14.81
Turnout		1,38,871	75.20%	▲2.42
Registered electors		1,85,565		▲6.35
INC gain from JJP		Swing	▼2.15	

=== Assembly Election 2019 ===
2019 Haryana Legislative Assembly election: Julana
Party	Candidate	Votes	%	±%
JJP	Amarjeet Dhanda	61,942	49.01	
BJP	Parminder Singh Dhull	37,749	29.87	▲20.2
INC	Dharmender Singh Dhull	12,440	9.84	▼15.78
BSP	Naresh	4,020	3.18	▼14.76
LSP	Ramphool Sharma	3,592	2.84	
CPI(M)	Ramesh Chander	2,016	1.60	▲0.8
AAP	Rajkumar Pahal	958	0.76	
Independent	Telu Ram Jangra	930	0.74	
INLD	Amit Malik Nidani	826	0.65	▼43.33
Margin of victory		24,193	19.14	▲0.78
Turnout		1,26,375	72.78	▼4.81
Registered electors		1,73,645		▲8.45
JJP gain from INLD		Swing	▲5.03	

=== Assembly Election 2014 ===
2014 Haryana Legislative Assembly election: Julana
Party	Candidate	Votes	%	±%
INLD	Parminder Singh Dhull	54,632	43.98	▲0.26
INC	Dharmender Singh Dhull	31,826	25.62	▼5.81
BSP	Arvind Kumar Sharma	22,286	17.94	▲9.6
BJP	Sanjeev Buwana	12,013	9.67	▲7.27
CPI(M)	Parkash Chander	984	0.79	▼0.53
Margin of victory		22,806	18.36	▲6.07
Turnout		1,24,219	77.58	▲1.48
Registered electors		1,60,108		▲16.88
INLD hold		Swing	▲0.26	

=== Assembly Election 2009 ===
2009 Haryana Legislative Assembly election: Julana
Party	Candidate	Votes	%	±%
INLD	Parminder Singh Dhull	45,576	43.72	▲25.31
INC	Sher Singh	32,765	31.43	▼5.79
HJC(BL)	Sudhir Gautam	9,934	9.53	
BSP	Sumer Chabri	8,696	8.34	
BJP	Jahawar Saini	2,508	2.41	▼0.58
CPI(M)	Ramesh Chander	1,383	1.33	▼0.16
SP	Dr. Sanjay Lathar	1,161	1.11	▼4.64
Margin of victory		12,811	12.29	▲4.41
Turnout		1,04,255	76.11	▲0.80
Registered electors		1,36,988		▲19.11
INLD gain from INC		Swing	▲6.50	

=== Assembly Election 2005 ===
2005 Haryana Legislative Assembly election: Julana
Party	Candidate	Votes	%	±%
INC	Sher Singh	32,232	37.22	▼7.76
Independent	Parminder Singh Dhull	25,410	29.34	
INLD	Partap Singh	15,937	18.40	▼23.85
SP	Sanjay Lathar	4,983	5.75	▲4.71
BJP	Shamsher Singh	2,586	2.99	
LJP	Mukesh	1,308	1.51	
CPI(M)	Parkash Chander	1,289	1.49	▲0.16
Independent	Hariom	890	1.03	
Independent	Narender Kumar	706	0.82	
BRP	Dalbir	446	0.51	
Margin of victory		6,822	7.88	▲5.15
Turnout		86,609	75.31	▲2.35
Registered electors		1,15,008		▲8.89
INC hold		Swing	▼7.76	

=== Assembly Election 2000 ===
2000 Haryana Legislative Assembly election: Julana
Party	Candidate	Votes	%	±%
INC	Sher Singh	34,657	44.98	▲41.82
INLD	Suraj Bhan Kajal	32,556	42.25	
Independent	Samunder	3,037	3.94	
Independent	Radhey Shyam	1,894	2.46	
BSP	Ram Chandera Bhardwaj Barister	1,711	2.22	
Independent	Dharambir	1,083	1.41	
CPI(M)	Comrad Vedpal	1,027	1.33	
SP	Sanjay Lathar	805	1.04	▼2.45
Margin of victory		2,101	2.73	▼13.37
Turnout		77,058	73.65	▲2.70
Registered electors		1,05,614		▲1.49
INC gain from HVP		Swing	▼1.79	

=== Assembly Election 1996 ===
1996 Haryana Legislative Assembly election: Julana
Party	Candidate	Votes	%	±%
HVP	Satya Narain Lathar	34,195	46.77	
SAP	Suraj Bhan S/O Harnarain	22,425	30.67	
AIIC(T)	Parminder Singh Dhull	5,211	7.13	
SP	Chander Bhan	2,553	3.49	
INC	Kulbir Singh	2,310	3.16	▼18.13
Independent	Shamsher Singh	1,356	1.85	
Independent	Krishan Chander	760	1.04	
Independent	Dilbag Singh	664	0.91	
JP	Suraj Bhan S/O Fateh Singh	398	0.54	▼25.61
Margin of victory		11,770	16.10	▲11.24
Turnout		73,117	72.53	▲3.26
Registered electors		1,04,065		▲12.85
HVP gain from JP		Swing	▲20.62	

=== Assembly Election 1991 ===
1991 Haryana Legislative Assembly election: Julana
Party	Candidate	Votes	%	±%
JP	Suraj Bhan	16,157	26.15	
INC	Parminder Singh Dhull	13,154	21.29	▼9.99
JD	Chander Bha S/O Risal Singh	8,190	13.26	
Independent	Preet Singh	6,527	10.56	
Independent	Chander Bhan S/O Ram Nath	5,126	8.30	
Independent	Sat Narain	4,826	7.81	
BJP	Hari Mohan	3,563	5.77	
Independent	Zile Singh	1,779	2.88	
Independent	Ram Kumar	785	1.27	
Independent	Balbir	405	0.66	
Margin of victory		3,003	4.86	▼29.51
Turnout		61,786	69.70	▼6.98
Registered electors		92,217		▲9.34
JP gain from LKD		Swing	▼39.51	

=== Assembly Election 1987 ===
1987 Haryana Legislative Assembly election: Julana
Party	Candidate	Votes	%	±%
LKD	Kulbir Singh	40,965	65.66	▲31.06
INC	Fateh Singh	19,518	31.28	▲6.67
Independent	Devi Ram	651	1.04	
Independent	Chander Bhan	396	0.63	
Independent	Jagat Singh	387	0.62	
VHP	Suraj Bhan	297	0.48	
Margin of victory		21,447	34.37	▲24.40
Turnout		62,394	75.01	▲2.48
Registered electors		84,337		▲16.68
LKD hold		Swing	▲31.06	

=== Assembly Election 1982 ===
1982 Haryana Legislative Assembly election: Julana
Party	Candidate	Votes	%	±%
LKD	Kulbir Singh	17,880	34.59	
INC	Shamsher Singh	12,723	24.62	▲17.15
Independent	Dal Singh	8,145	15.76	
Independent	Kishan Lal	6,920	13.39	
Independent	Daya Singh	1,357	2.63	
Independent	Satbir Singh	1,083	2.10	
JP	Shri Kishan	980	1.90	▼37.19
CPI(M)	Balbir Singh	919	1.78	
Independent	Daya Nand S/O Ami Lal	539	1.04	
Independent	Ram Babu	324	0.63	
Margin of victory		5,157	9.98	▼6.68
Turnout		51,685	72.47	▲1.15
Registered electors		72,283		▲21.15
LKD gain from JP		Swing	▼4.50	

=== Assembly Election 1977 ===
1977 Haryana Legislative Assembly election: Julana
Party	Candidate	Votes	%	±%
JP	Zile Singh	16,407	39.09	
Independent	Ghasi Ram	9,414	22.43	
Independent	Maya Chand	9,396	22.39	
INC	Dilbag Singh	3,134	7.47	▼58.08
Independent	Chattar Singh	2,259	5.38	
Independent	Panna Lal	865	2.06	
Independent	Sada Nand	497	1.18	
Margin of victory		6,993	16.66	▼14.43
Turnout		41,972	70.92	▼4.82
Registered electors		59,662		▼2.12
JP gain from INC		Swing	▼26.45	

=== Assembly Election 1972 ===
1972 Haryana Legislative Assembly election: Julana
Party	Candidate	Votes	%	±%
INC	Fateh Singh	30,033	65.54	
INC(O)	Ram Singh	15,788	34.46	
Margin of victory		14,245	31.09	
Turnout		45,821	76.76	
Registered electors		60,957		
INC gain from NCN				

=== Assembly By-election 1970 ===
1970 Haryana Legislative Assembly by-election: Julana
Party	Candidate	Votes	%	±%
NCN	Dal Singh	23,592		
INC(J)	Fateh Singh	17,764		
Independent	J. Singh	954		
Independent	F. Lal	145		
Independent	B.Singh	104		
Margin of victory		5,828		
NCN gain from SWA				

=== Assembly Election 1968 ===
1968 Haryana Legislative Assembly election: Julana
Party	Candidate	Votes	%	±%
SWA	Narain Singh	17,052	49.90	
INC	Dal Singh	16,008	46.85	▼9.39
Independent	Ram Dhari	1,109	3.25	
Margin of victory		1,044	3.06	▼21.29
Turnout		34,169	65.95	▼10.13
Registered electors		52,879		▲3.22
SWA gain from INC		Swing		

=== Assembly Election 1967 ===
1967 Haryana Legislative Assembly election: Julana
Party	Candidate	Votes	%	±%
INC	Dal Singh	21,534	56.24	
ABJS	G. Ram	12,211	31.89	
Independent	C. Dutt	3,685	9.62	
Independent	M. Ram	861	2.25	
Margin of victory		9,323	24.35	
Turnout		38,291	77.47	
Registered electors		51,229		
INC win (new seat)				

== See also ==
- List of constituencies of the Haryana Legislative Assembly
- Jind district
