= Harigarh =

- village
- Location in Haryana, India Harigarh (India)
- Coordinates: 29°19′3.3708″N 76°36′32.1516″E
- Country: India
- State: Haryana
- District: Jind district

Government
  - Type: Local government
  - Body: Panchayat

Area
  - Total: 5.16 km^{2} (1.99 sq mi)
- Elevation: 221 m (725 ft)

Population (2011)
  - Total: 2,344
  - Density: 454/km^{2} (1,180/sq mi)

Languages
  - Official: Hindi
- Time zone: UTC+5:30 (IST)
- PIN: 126112
- Literacy: 74.77% (total); 84.03% (male); 64.11% (female)
- Sex ratio: 857 ♂/♀

Harigarh is a village in Safidon tehsil of Jind district in the Indian state of Haryana. It forms a part of Hisar division. It is located 33 kilometres (21 mi) east of its district headquarters at Jind, 12 kilometres (7.5 mi) from Safidon and 184 kilometres (114 mi) from the state capital at Chandigarh.

The village is on the border of the Jind and Panipat districts. Safidon, Gohana, Assandh, and Jind are the nearby cities.

Nearby villages are: Ram Nagar (2 km), Bagru Kalan (2 km), Bagru Khurd (2 km), Anchra Khurd (2 km), Hadwa (5 km) are the nearby villages to Harigarh. Harigarh is surrounded by Pillu khera Tehsil towards west, Mundlana Tehsil towards east, Gohana Tehsil towards south.

== Education ==
No colleges

=== Schools ===
- National Sr. Secondary School, Bagru Kalan
- Saraswati Sr. Secondary School, Bagru Kalan
- Vedic Kanya Gurukul Sr. Secondary School
- B.R.S.K. Public School
- MD Sr. Secondary School, Baghru Khurd

== Transportation ==
Sila Kheri Halt Rail Way Station, Budhakhera Railway Station are the closest railway stations to Harigarh. Panipat Junction is the nearest major railway station, 39 kilometres (24 mi) distant.
