= Paraheda Shiv Mandir =

Temple in Banswara in Rajasthan, India

Religion
- Affiliation: Hinduism
- District: Banswara
- Deity: Shiva

Location
- Location: Near Partapur, Garhi
- State: Rajasthan
- Country: India

Paraheda shiva mandir is situated at near Partapur town in Garhi tahsil of Banswara. It is 25 km from Banswara district of Indian state of Rajasthan. The temple is known for its old and fine sculptures.

Many people come here for worship of Shiva Bhagvan. There is wrecked nandi's idol in front of temple. Arthuna famous for Shiva temple is 15–16 km from here via Partapur.
