= Muana =

Coordinates: 23°50′N 70°52′E

Muana is a village situated in Jind district in the state of Haryana, north India.

== History ==
Muana is situated near Safidon, a historic place described as Sarpdaman in the epic Mahabharta, and near Asandh which was the capital of Jarasandh.

Muana is a very old and historic village. Before about 750 years ago, it was ruled by the Varah Rajputs. Then it was won by Madadh Rajputs and came under Madadh 360 Riyasat. It was won by four Madadh brothers, Thakur Mohan Singh, Thakur Nahar Singh, Thakur Bishan Singh and Thakur That Singh.first Brahmin gotar Bhardwaj Tharwal .The descendants of these four brothers are still there and known as Moh and Rawat Panna, Nahar Panna, Bisty Panna and Thob Panna.
