= Thikana muana =

The Muana or Mowana village is situated in block Safidon, District Jind of state Haryana, India. Muana is a very old and historic Khera or village. The village Muana is the Thikana of Madadh Rajputs.
