= Shiv Mandir =

Shiv Mandir may refer to the following Shiva Hindu temples:

- Shiv Mandir, Ambarnath, Maharashtra, India
- Paraheda Shiv Mandir, Partapur, Rajasthan, India
- Sagar Shiv Mandir, island of Goyave de Chine, Mauritius
- Umarkot Shiv Mandir, Sindh, Pakistan
- Shiv Mandir, Kiloi, Haryana, India
- Saketri Shiv Mandir, Panchkula, Haryana India
- Temple in the Sea, Carapichaima, Caroni County, Couva-Tabaquite-Talparo, Trinidad and Tobago

== See also ==
- List of Shiva temples in India
