= Gulkani =

- Village
- Location in Haryana, India Gulkani (India)
- Coordinates: 29.2826556°N 76.2053668°E
- Country: India
- State: Haryana
- District: Jind

Population
  - Total: 2,000−2,500

Languages
  - Official: Haryanvi
- Time zone: UTC+5:30 (IST)
- Postal code: 126102
- ISO 3166 code: IN-HR
- Vehicle registration: HR31
- Website: haryana.gov.in

Gulkani is a village in Jind district, Haryana, India, 194 kilometres (121 mi) from the state capital of Chandigarh and 137 kilometres (85 mi) from Delhi. It is 12 kilometres (7.5 mi) from the district headquarters.

Gulkani is situated on the Hisar-Jind highway (National Highway 9). Its postal address is VPO Gulkani, 126102, Jind. The nearest airport is Indira Gandhi International Airport in Delhi.
