= Barodi, Jind =

Village in Haryana, India

Coordinates: 29.387°N 76.283°E

Barodi is a village in Jind sub-district of Jind District in Haryana, India.
