= Amarjeet Dhanda =

Indian politician (born 1983)

Member of Haryana Legislative Assembly
- In office 24 October 2019 – 8 October 2024
- Preceded by: Parminder Singh Dhull
- Succeeded by: Vinesh Phogat
- Constituency: Julana

Personal details
- Born: 23 January 1983 (age 43) Haryana, India
- Party: Jananayak Janata Party

Amarjeet Dhanda is a local politician belonging to the Jananayak Janata Party (Haryana). He was elected as a member of the Haryana Legislative Assembly from Julana constituency on 24 October 2019.

== Electoral Performance ==
2024 Haryana Legislative Assembly election: Julana
Party	Candidate	Votes	%	±%
INC	Vinesh Phogat	65,080	46.86%	▲37.02
BJP	Yogesh Kumar	59,065	42.53%	▲12.66
INLD	Surender Lather	10,158	7.31%	New
JJP	Amarjeet Dhanda	2,477	1.78%	▼47.23
AAP	Kavita Rani	1,280	0.92%	▲0.16
NOTA	None of the Above	202	0.15%	New
Margin of victory		6,015	4.33%	▼14.81
Turnout		1,38,871	75.20%	▲2.42
Registered electors		1,85,565		▲6.35
INC gain from JJP		Swing	▼2.15	

2019 Haryana Legislative Assembly election: Julana
Party	Candidate	Votes	%	±%
JJP	Amarjeet Dhanda	61,942	49.01	
BJP	Parminder Singh Dhull	37,749	29.87	▲20.2
INC	Dharmender Singh Dhull	12,440	9.84	▼15.78
BSP	Naresh	4,020	3.18	▼14.76
LSP	Ramphool Sharma	3,592	2.84	
CPI(M)	Ramesh Chander	2,016	1.60	▲0.8
AAP	Rajkumar Pahal	958	0.76	
Independent	Telu Ram Jangra	930	0.74	
INLD	Amit Malik Nidani	826	0.65	▼43.33
Margin of victory		24,193	19.14	▲0.78
Turnout		1,26,375	72.78	▼4.81
Registered electors		1,73,645		▲8.45
JJP gain from INLD		Swing	▲5.03	
