= Morkhi =

- Village
- Location within Haryana Location within India
- Coordinates: 29°16′35″N 76°32′05″E
- Country: India
- State: Haryana
- District: Jind

Population (2011)
  - Total: 6,162

Morkhi is a village located in the Jind district of Haryana state, India. It is located around 165.4 kilometers from Chandigarh.
