= Nandgarh, Jind =

Nandgarh is a village situated in the middle of Haryana state of India. It is at the border of Jind and Sonipat. Local 'Boli' of Nandgarh is Haryanavi(with an essence of Punjabi). Before 1966 this village was a part of Sangrur district (now in Punjab). But in 1966 when the government decided to divide Punjab it was assigned a district Jind. The main income source of Nandgarh is Agriculture. From the border of this village flows a canal named 'Sunder Branch Canal'. Mr. Rohtas is the sarpanch of village Nandgarh.
