= Ponkeri Kheri =

Ponkeri Kheri is a village of around 3500 population, in Jind district of Haryana state, India.
