= Parminder Singh Dhull =

Indian politician

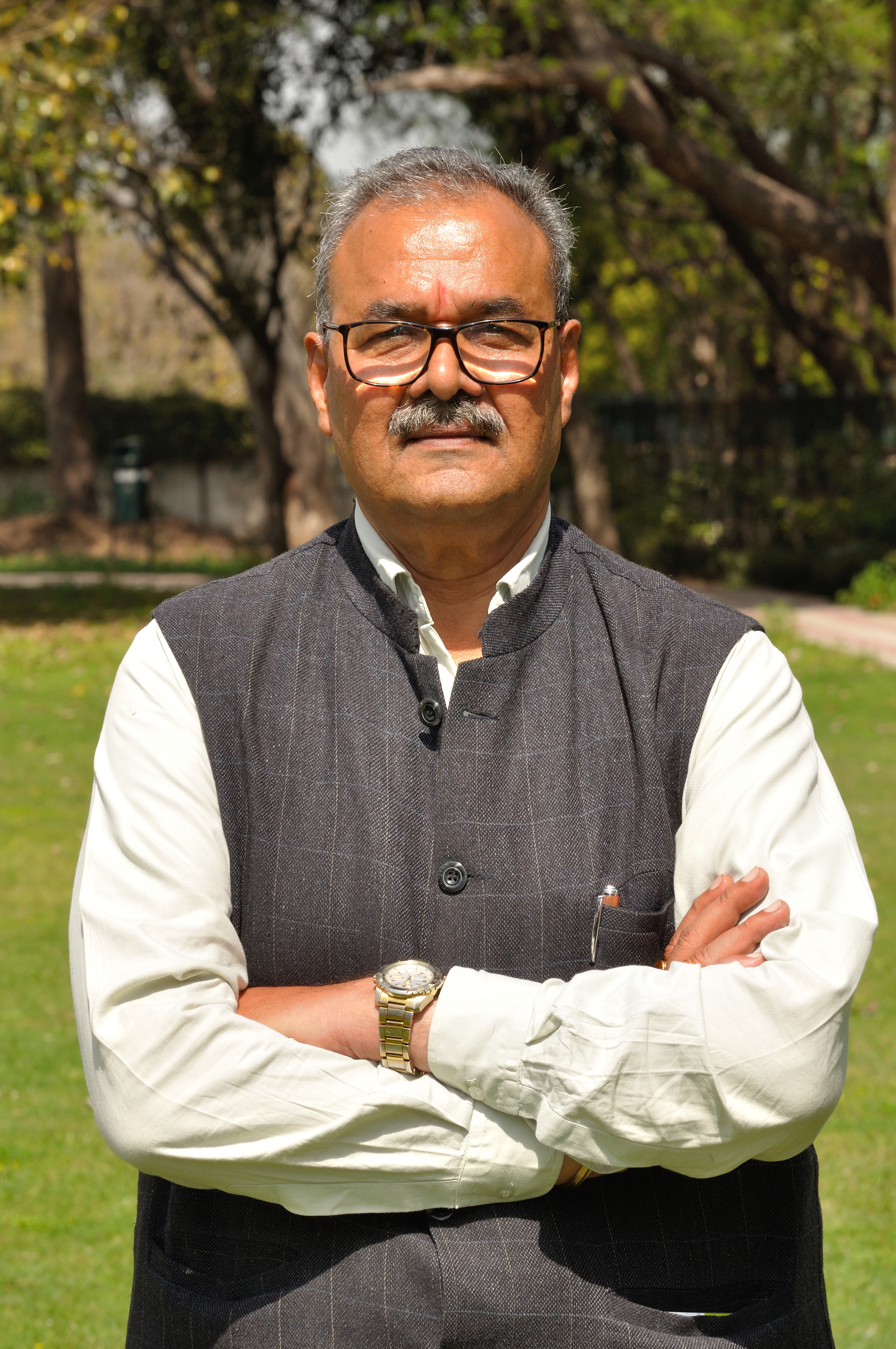

Member of Legislative Assembly
- Constituency: Julana
- In office 23 October 2009 – 25 June 2019

Personal details
- Born: 4 March 1957 (age 69) Jind, Haryana, India
- Party: Indian National Congress
- Spouse: Bimla
- Children: 2 sons, including Ravinder Singh Dhull and Satyender Singh Dhull
- Parent: Chaudhary Dal Singh (father)
- Occupation: Politician
- Profession: Advocate

Parminder Singh Dhull (born 4 March 1957) is an Indian politician from the State of Haryana. He remained a Member of Legislative Assembly of Haryana from Julana constituency of Jind District till he resigned as such on 25 June 2019. He contested on a Bhartiya Janta Party ticket in the 2019 Haryana Assembly elections but failed to retain his seat. He resigned from Bhartiya Janta Party on 20 October 2020 in protest of the Farmers Bills introduced by Government of India. His father Chaudhary Dal Singh was a former minister and a freedom fighter.

== Early career ==
Parminder Singh Dhull lost by a narrow margin in first election contested by him in 1991.

== Later career ==
Dhull bagged the INLD party ticket for the 2009 assembly elections and won by a record margin of nearly 13000 votes from Julana, a constituency that borders Rohtak district and Kiloi, the constituency represented by the then Chief Minister Bhupinder Singh Hooda. In the 2014 Lok Sabha elections, Julana was among the few constituencies from where INLD emerged to be a winner, in the 2014 Haryana Assembly Elections Julana again voted for him and he won by a margin of around 23000 votes, the second highest by an INLD candidate.

In both terms, 2009–14 and 2014–19, he has been one of the most vocal and active parliamentarians of Haryana Vidhan Sabha. From asking the maximum number of questions to leading the table in Calling Attention Motions or Supplementary Questions list, he has numerous state as well as national-level protests and campaigns to his credit. He has served as a member of various committees of the Vidhan Sabha. During the Budget Session of 2018, he protested outside the Haryana Assembly for the rise in crop prices. He is reported to be the first MLA in the state's history to have published his own Report Card, which highlights the issues and campaigns he led for the people of the state. He still has a stronghold over his constituency, making him influential in the district.

== Role in Protests ==
- He has played an important role in SYL protest against monopoly on Yamuna and Sutlej waters
- Resigned from party following the introduction of the three controversial Farm bills
- Raised issues outside the Vidhan Sabha showcasing farmers' issues and interests of common people

== Foreign Travels ==
Sri Lanka, U.A.E, Malaysia and Bhutan

== Memberships ==
- Remained member of State Executive of the Indian National Lok Dal
- Member Bar Association Punjab and Haryana High Court

== Assembly Committees ==
- Member, Committee on Public Accounts for the year 2009-10
- Member, Committee on Public Accounts for the year 2010-11
- Member, Committee on Public Accounts for the year 2011-12
- Member, Committee on Public Accounts for the year 2012-13
- Member, Committee on Government Assurance for the year 2013-14
- Member, Committee on Public Accounts for the year 2014-15
- Member, Rules Committee for the year 2015-16
- Special Invitee, Committee on Government Assurance for the year 2015-16
- Member, Committee on Public Accounts for the year 2016-17
- Chairman, Committee on Government Assurance for the year 2017-18
- Member, Rules Committee for the year 2017-18
- Member, Committee on Public Accounts for the year 2018-19
