= Arthuna =

- Town
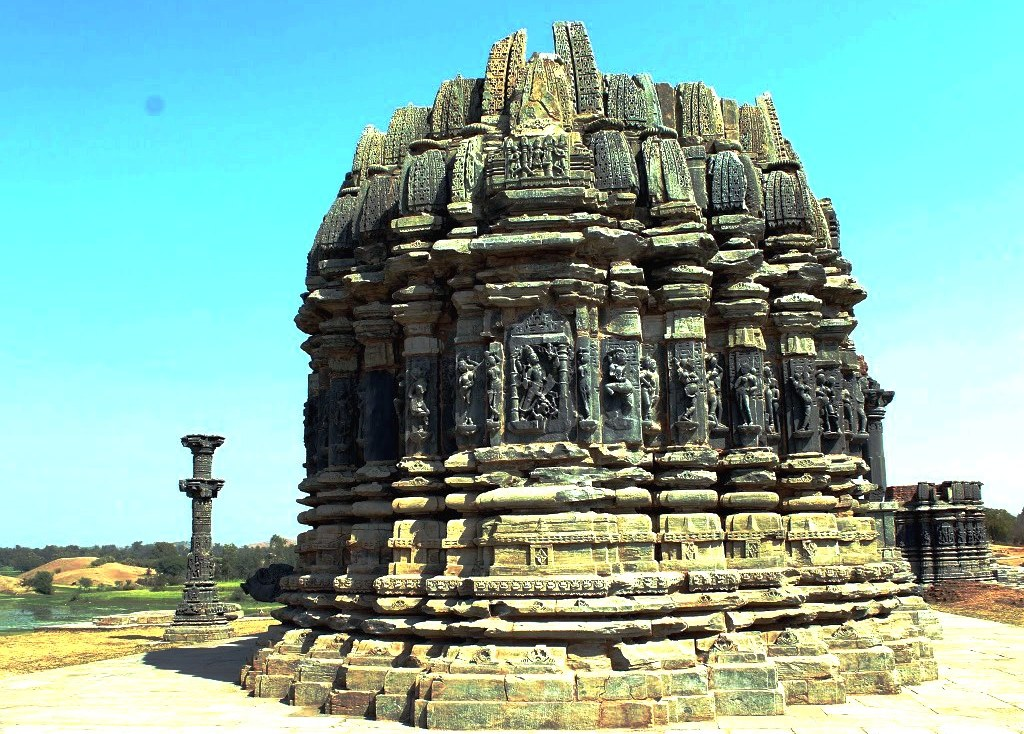

- Location in Rajasthan, India Arthuna (India)
- Coordinates: 23.4981689°N 74.0960995°E
- Country: India
- State: Rajasthan
- District: Banswara
- Tehsil: Garhi

Government
  - Type: Government of Rajasthan
  - Body: individual
- Elevation: 161 m (528 ft)

Languages
  - Official: Hindi
- Time zone: UTC+5:30 (IST)
- Postal code: 327032

Arthuna is a town in Banswara district, Rajasthan, India.

== History ==
The old name of the place was Utthunaka. It was the capital of Paramara rulers of Vagad during eleventh-twelfth centuries A.D. They patronized both Jainism and Saivism simultaneously, so they constructed a number of Shiva and Jain temples.

Arthuna seems to have been one of the most important commercial centres in 11th-century Rajasthan. One inscription dated to 1080 is mostly unintelligible, but the parts that can be made out include a list of items sold at a hatta in Arthuna. This list includes barley, sugarcane, jaggery, liquor, brass products, madder, betel leaves, salt, and possibly also "loads of grain" and cattle feed. The record also mentions at least two types of manufacturers present at Arthuna: kamsyakaras, or brassworkers, and kalyapalas, or liquor distillers. Arthuna formed the central node in a cluster of trade centres in southern Rajasthan; Talabad and Panahera are two others attested from contemporary sources.

== Arthuna temple ==
An inscription of the Paramara prince Chamundaraja records that he built a temple of Shiva called Mandalesa in honour of his father in A.D. 1079. Another inscription of A.D. 1080 mentions that his officer’s son named Anantapala also founded a temple of Shiva. In a group of temples known as Hanumangarhi is located Nilakantha Mahadeva temple, besides other shrines and a stepped Kunda. There are three Shiva temples. The place was associated with the Lakulisa sect of Saivism. The temples of Hanuman and Vishnu also belong to the early period. Bhushana built a Jaina temple in A.D. 1190. A few Jain pillars also being found at the site which were built probably after 11th century. Another temple at the site is of the Chaunsatha Yoginis. Galiakot and Banswara are the two nearby religious places for the Bohras. The nearest large town is Partapur.

== Transport ==
Nearest international airport - Ahmedabad 255 km.
Nearest airport - Udaipur 150 km.
Nearest railway station - Ratlam 115 km.

Arthuna is 145 km away from Udaipur. One can get a bus for it from Ratlam from where it is at distance of 115 km. Area code for telephone is 0091-2963
