= Jheel, Jind =

Details of village

Jheel is a village in Uchana block of Jind district which is in the state of Haryana, India.

The village is surrounded by other villages namely Ghaso, Dumarkha, Badanpur, Kabarcha among others.

The main occupation is agriculture, Government Job & Private Job. Village Settle By JAT (JATT) Mor Gottar, Dada Khera Growing by Gottar Mor & There are following Gotters are Settle in Village Sheokand, Kairon, Gill, Beniwal, Khattkar, Dult, Goyat, Ghangas etc.People of many castes live here, such as Chamar, Valmiki, Lohar, Goldsmith, Blacksmith, etc.

== Demographics ==
According to the Census 2011, the village consists of 836 households and a population of 6147 citizens. Other demographic data of the village is as follows:

- Sex Ratio - Number of females per 100 males - 95
- Sex Ratio (0–6 years) - Number of females per 100 males in the age group of 0-6 year olds - 87
- Literacy Rate - Percentage of educated people versus the total population - 75%
- Literacy Ratio - Number of educated females per 100 educated males - 78
