= Njirana =

Luritjan religion

In Luritja religion and mythology, Njirana is a god, father of Julana, who was alive during the Dreaming.
