= Choudhary Ram Kishan Bairagi =

Indian politician

Ch. Ram Kishan Bairagi
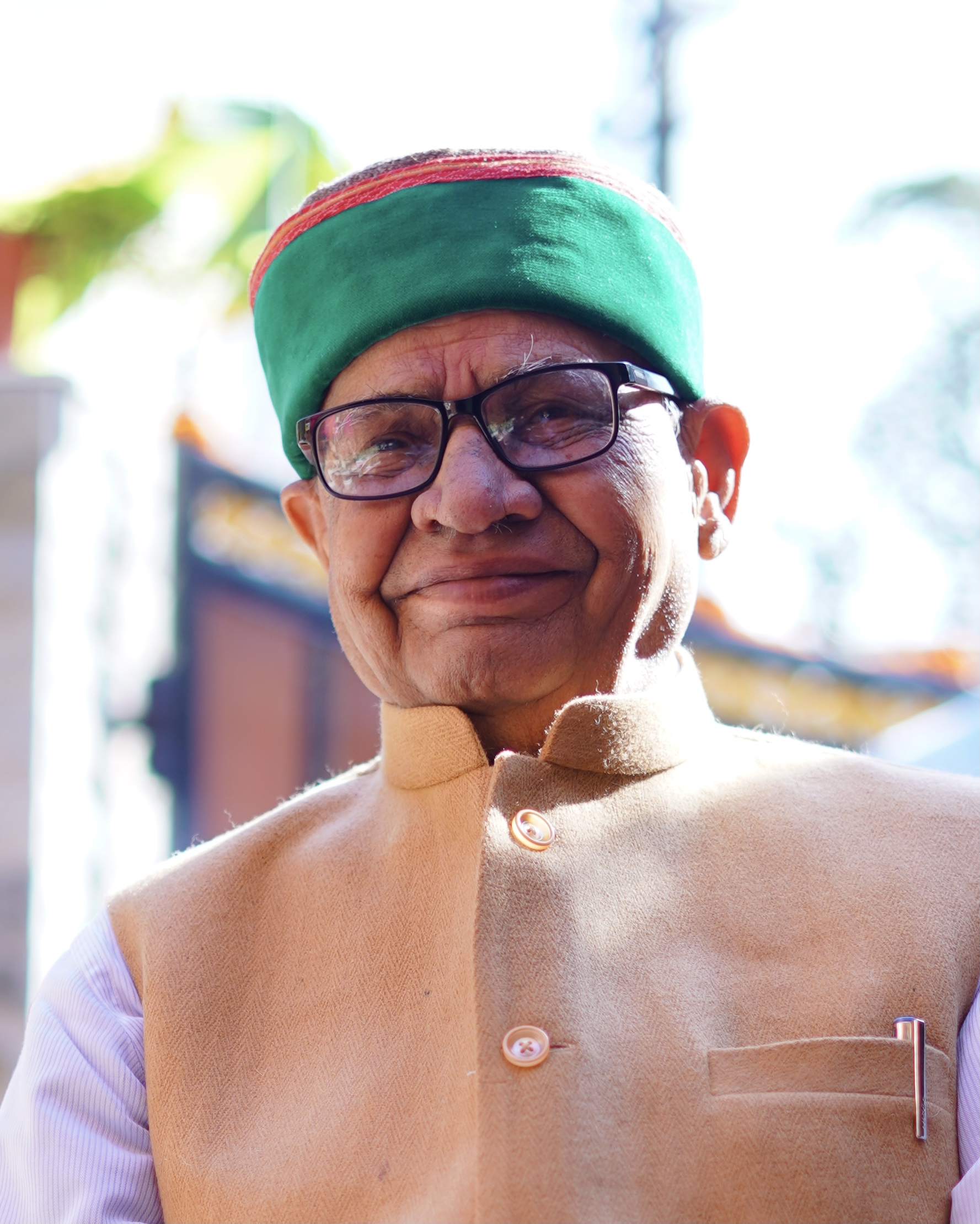
- Chaudhary Ram Kishan Bairagi

Member of Legislative Assembly
- In office 1977–1982
- Preceded by: Ch. Dhaja Ram (INC)
- Succeeded by: Kundan Lal (INC)
- Constituency: Safidon, Jind, Haryana

Chairman, Housing Board, Haryana
- Constituency: Safidon

Personal details
- Born: 1938 (age 87–88) Rajana Kalan, Safidon, Haryana, India
- Party: Bharatiya Janta Party
- Spouse: Smt. Bharpai Devi
- Children: 4
- Education: B.A. L.L.B
- Alma mater: Lucknow University
- Profession: Politician

Chaudhary Ram Kishan Bairagi is a senior leader of Indian National Congress and Janata Party from Haryana. He has served as minister in Government of Haryana, Chief Parliamentary Secretary and Chairman of Haryana Housing Board. He joined the BJP in 2014.

He contested his first election from Indian National Congress at the age of 29 in the year 1968 and lost by a minuscule margin. He successfully fought the 1977 Haryana Vidhan Sabha election representing Janata Party.

Bairagi was the member of the Haryana Legislative Assembly from the Janata Party representing the Safidon Vidhan sabha Constituency in Haryana since 1977 to 1982.
