= Nachar Khera =

Coordinates: 29°28′N 76°03′E

Nachar Khera is a village in Jind district, Haryana state, India.

== Neighbouring villages of Nachar Khera ==
Kakrod, Durjanpur, Surbura Udeypur are touching the border of village Nachar Khera from different sides.

Danoda, Matloda, Mangalpur. Dohana Khera, Litani, Makhand, Uchana Khurd, Kumbha, Chhan, Banbhori etc. are also includes in nearby villages.
