= Alewa =

- Township
- Location in Haryana, India Alewa (India)
- Coordinates: 29°28′35.994″N 76°27′7.8624″E
- Country: India
- State: Haryana
- District: Jind district

Government
  - Type: Local government
  - Body: Panchayat

Area
  - Total: 31.58 km^{2} (12.19 sq mi)
- Elevation: 230 m (750 ft)

Population (2011)
  - Total: 14,004
  - Density: 443.4/km^{2} (1,149/sq mi)

Languages
  - Official: Hindi
- Time zone: UTC+5:30 (IST)
- PIN: 126111
- Telephone code: 01681
- Literacy: 69.10% (total); 78.41% (male); 58.29% (female)
- Sex ratio: 860 ♂/♀

Alewa is a town in Jind district, Haryana state, India, with a population of nearly 14,000. The village is the location of many temples. It lies 26 kilometres (16 mi) from Jind in north direction. It is also a tehsil of Jind district. It lies on the Jind to Karnal-Kurukshetra highway. Kush tirth/ramsar tirth at Kuchrana Kalan is a Mahabharata period important religious place.

== Demographics ==
Alewa is sited north east of Jind and has Pillukhera tehsil to its north.

== Villages in the tehsil ==
- Alewa
- Kuchrana Kalan
- Khanda
- Gohiyan
- Dhillowal
- Mandi Khurd
- Hassanpur
- Nagura
- Katwal
- Bighana
- Mohmad Khera
- Dhathrath
- Raichandwala
- pegan
- Durana
- Shamdo
- Chuhadpur
- Kheri Bulanwali

== Transportation ==
Alewa lies on the Jind-Assandh-Karnal road, about 20 km (12 mi) from Jind. There is a bus service every 60 minutes for jind And Assandh.

The nearest railway stations are Jind Junction and Safidon.

== See also ==
- Rohtak
