= Pindara Temple =

Pandu Pindara

Religion
- Affiliation: Hinduism
- District: Jind
- Deity: Shiva & Chandra

Location
- Location: Jind
- State: Haryana
- Country: India

Architecture
- Type: North Indian
- Creator: Pandavas

Website
- https://haryanatourism.gov.in/Destination/pindara

Pindara or Pandu Pindara Temple is situated at Pindara village about 6.5 km from Jind, Haryana, India.

== History ==
According to a legend, the Pandavas offered here pinds to their forefathers and hence the name of the village is Pandu Pindara. A fair is held on Somavati Amavas. This place is also called Som Tirath.
