= Safidon =

Safidon Sarp Daman
- City
- Safidon Tehsil in Jind district (Haryana)

- Location in Haryana, India Safidon (India)
- Coordinates: 29.42°N 76.67°E
- Country: India
- State: Haryana
- District: Jind

Government
  - Member of Parliament, Lok Sabha: Satpal Brahamchari (INC)
  - Member of the Legislative Assembly (India): Mr.Ram Kumar Gautam (B.J.P)
  - Rank: 25 in {HR}
- Elevation: 221 m (725 ft)

Population (2011)
  - Total: 34,720

Languages
  - Official: Hindi, Regional Haryanvi
- Time zone: UTC+5:30 (IST)
- PIN: 126112
- Telephone code: 01686
- ISO 3166 code: IN-HR
- Vehicle registration: HR-33, HR-56
- Lok Sabha constituency: Sonipat
- Website: haryana.gov.in, safidoncity.com

Safidon, previously known as Sarp Daman, is a city and a municipal committee, near city of Jind in Jind district in the Indian state of Haryana. It is approx. 40 km from Jind city, the district headquarters.

== History ==
The area was first occupied by a Pre-Harappan Chalcolithic agricultural, whose pottery has been recovered from a number of places near Safidon, including Hatt, Harigarh (Hattkeshawar), Anta, Morkhi, and Beri Khera. The area was irrigated during the reign of Firuz Shah Tughlaq (1351–1388) of the Tughlaq dynasty, who built a canal from the Yamuna which entered the district at Anta, and thence flowing through the present Jind tehsil from east to west in the line of the old Chutang nadi past the town of Safidon and Jind, reached up to Hisar. Firoz also made administrative changes, creating a separate Iqta of Safidon and placed the entire area of the present district under its Mukta, Yalkhan, a trusted noble. He also changed the name of Safidon to Tughluqpur.

After Firoz's death, discord disrupted the Delhi Sultanate, and the Tughlaq dynasty lost Safidon and Jind. Timur attacked northern India in 1398, entering Haryana from Punjab. The district of Jind did not suffer much at his hands; during his march from Kaithal to Panipat he touched only the outskirts of the district except for a short distance of a few kilometers from Muana (the biggest village of district) to Safidon and a little beyond. While local inhabitants fled, the fort of Safidon was burned.

Gajpat Singh, a great-grandson of Phul, the founder of the Phulkian Misl, one of the 12 confederacies of the Sikhs in the 18th century took advantage of the above situation. He took part in the attack of the Sikhs on the province of Sirhind in 1763 in which Zain Khan, the Afghan governor of the province, was killed. Gajpat Singh occupied a large tract of the country including Jind and Safidon as his share of the spoil.

During the reorganization of the Punjab in 1966, the Sangrur district was divided and Jind and Narwana Tehsils were allocated to Haryana and were constituted into Jind district. The Jind tehsil was divided into two tehsils of Jind and Safidon in 1967. In January 1973, five villages of Kaithal Tehsil were transferred to Safidon Tehsil.

== Geography ==
Safidon is located at 29.42°N Latitudes and 76.67°E Longitudes.

Safidon is the center of Panipat and Jind. The town is the headquarters of the tehsil of the same name. It is situated on the bank of the Hansi branch of the Western Yamuna canal, 35 km (22 mi) northeast of Jind.

The elevation of Safidon is about 221 m (725 ft) above sea level. The fertile land of Safidon paves the way for the growth of crops such as wheat, paddy, sugarcane, millets, pulses, vegetables and fruits; accompanied by well developed irrigation facilities. The groundwater of some villages like Anta, Rampura, Khera Khemawati, and Chapper are considered to be the best in Jind district.

Safidon has a very moderate climate. Summers are hotter and winters are colder here. The rainfall is almost good, unless Safidon is experiencing a monsoon deficiency.

Safidon is connected to major cities through roads and railways. There is one bus stand in the city where direct buses to major destinations like Delhi, Chandigarh, Panipat, Jind, Dehradun, Karnal, Kaithal, Sirsa, Hisar, Haridwar, Asandh, Pundri, Gohana etc. are available. Safidon comes under Jind Depot of Haryana Roadways. Trains for Panipat, Jind, Rohtak, Sangrur and Bathinda are available at Safidon Railway Station. Safidon Junction is administered under Northern Railway (NR).

Haryana Urban Development Authority (HUDA) also develops the city and acquired the land for housing board. The Delhi NCR Board joined District Jind in the National Capital Region (India) Board.

== Demographics ==
The 2011 India Census reported that:

Safidon Tehsil of Jind district has total population of 253,629 as per the Census 2011. Out of which 135,860 are males while 117,769 are females. In 2011 there were total 47,598 families residing in Safidon Tehsil. The Average Sex Ratio of Safidon Tehsil is 867.

As per Census 2021, Safidon town had a population of 73700, out of which, 15.9% people lived in urban areas while 84.1% lived in the rural areas. The average literacy rate in urban areas is 80.5% while that in the rural areas is 71.6%. Also, the Sex Ratio of Urban areas in Safidon Tehsil is 882 while that of Rural areas is 864.

The population of Children of age 0–6 years in Safidon Tehsil is 33825 which is 13% of the total population. There are 18450 male children and 15375 female children between the age 0–6 years. Thus as per the Census 2011, the Child Sex Ratio of Safidon Tehsil is 833 which is less than Average Sex Ratio ( 867 ) of Safidon Tehsil.

The total literacy rate of Safidon Tehsil is 84.04%. The male literacy rate is 85.06% and the female literacy rate is 83.02% in Safidon Tehsil.Total literate in Safidon Tehsil were 160,547 of which male and female were 96,026 and 64,521 respectively.

Languages spoken in Safidon are Hindi, Haryanvi.

As per the Population Census 2011 data, following are some quick facts about Safidon Tehsil.

| | Total | Male | Female |
|---|---|---|---|
| Children (age 0–6) | 33,825 | 18,450 | 15,375 |
| Literacy | 84.04% | 85.06% | 83.02% |
| Scheduled Caste | 50,862 | 27,200 | 23,662 |
| Scheduled Tribe | 0 | 0 | 0 |
| Illiterate | 93,082 | 39,834 | 53,248 |

Caste wise Population - Safidon Tehsil

Schedule Caste (SC) constitutes 20.1% while Schedule Tribe (ST) were 0% of the total population in Safidon Tehsil.

| | Total | Male | Female |
|---|---|---|---|
| Schedule Caste | 50,862 | 27,200 | 23,662 |
| Schedule Tribe | 0 | 0 | 0 |

Religion wise Population - Safidon Tehsil

| Religion | Total | | Male | Female |
|---|---|---|---|---|
| Hindu | 232,974 | (91.86%) | 124,950 | 108,024 |
| Muslim | 4,262 | (1.68%) | 2,225 | 2,037 |
| Christian | 132 | (0.05%) | 60 | 72 |
| Sikh | 14,888 | (5.87%) | 7,874 | 7,014 |
| Buddhist | 37 | (0.01%) | 20 | 17 |
| Jain | 1,115 | (0.44%) | 602 | 513 |
| Other Religion | 3 | (0%) | 0 | 3 |
| No Religion Specified | 218 | (0.09%) | 129 | 89 |

Working Population - Safidon Tehsil

In Safidon Tehsil out of total population, 94,049 were engaged in work activities. 73.5% of workers describe their work as Main Work (Employment or Earning more than 6 Months) while 26.5% were involved in Marginal activity providing livelihood for less than 6 months. Of 94,049 workers engaged in Main Work, 29,646 were cultivators (owner or co-owner) while 11,992 were Agricultural labourers.

| | Total | Male | Female |
|---|---|---|---|
| Main Workers | 69,116 | 58,669 | 10,447 |
| Cultivators | 29,646 | 25,119 | 4,527 |
| Agriculture Labourer | 11,992 | 9,557 | 2,435 |
| Household Industries | 1,081 | 868 | 213 |
| Other Workers | 26,397 | 23,125 | 3,272 |
| Marginal Workers | 24,933 | 10,687 | 14,246 |
| Non Working | 159,580 | 66,504 | 93,076 |

== Administration ==
Safidon falls under Sonipat Lok Sabha Constituency. Talking about Haryana Legislative Assembly Elections, Safidon Constituency is No. 35 as per Election Commission. After every five years, people chose their representative by voting and send him/her to Vidhan Sabha.

Safidon is a Municipal Committee city in district of Jind, Haryana. The Safidon city is divided into 17 wards for which elections are held every 5 years. Safidon Municipal Committee has total administration over 6,568 houses to which it supplies basic amenities like water and sewerage. It is also authorized to build roads within Municipal Committee limits and impose taxes on properties coming under its jurisdiction.

The Safidon Sub-Division comprises Safidon tehsil and sub-tehsil Pillukhera. There are 70 villages under Safidon Tehsil. To govern each village, the Gram Panchayats are elected after every 5 years by the people in each village. A Block Samiti is also working under rules and regulations.

There is one Session Court in Safidon setup under all rules and regulations. The court has a Bar Council complex, where people can go for judicial advises and consult their attorneys.

The Mini Secretariat of Safidon includes the offices of Sub-Divisional Magistrate (SDM), Tehsildar and Deputy Superintendent of Police (DSP). The official residents of various office-bearers such as Judge, Tehsildar, SDM, etc. are also situated in the Mini Secretariat.

== Politics & Elections ==
Since the formation of Haryana, Safidon has always been the main centre of State politics. Many political rallies and public meetings have been held in Safidon. Political leaders like Ch. Devi Lal, Bhajan Lal, Bansi Lal, Bhupinder Singh Hooda, Ch. Virender Singh, Randeep Surjewala, etc. addressed several public gatherings and saw Safidon a major centre for deciding the election outcomes. Various political parties like Indian National Congress, Indian National Lok Dal, Bharatiya Janata Party, Bahujan Samaj Party, Communist Party of India, Loktantar Suraksa Party, etc. put their respective candidates in the election battleground. In the Legislative Assembly elections, Indian National Congress clinched Safidon maximum times, followed by Indian National Lok Dal. The people of Safidon also showed confidence and gave opportunity to independent candidates several times.

Below is the list of winners and runners-up in the Safidon assembly elections conducted so far.

| Year | A.C No. | Assembly Constituency Name | Type | Winner | Gender | Party | Votes | Runner up | Gender | Party | Votes |
|---|---|---|---|---|---|---|---|---|---|---|---|
| 2024 | 35 | Safidon | GEN | Ram Kumar Gautam | M | BJP | 58983 | Subhash Gangoli | M | INC | 54946 |
| 2019 | 35 | Safidon | GEN | Subhash Gangoli | M | INC | 56890 | Bachan Singh Arya | M | BJP | 53232 |
| 2014 | 35 | Safidon | GEN | Jasbir Deswal | M | IND | 29369 | Dr.Vandana Sharma | F | BJP | 27947 |
| 2009 | 35 | Safidon | GEN | Kali Ram Patwari | M | INLD | 38618 | Bachan Singh Arya | M | IND | 23182 |
| 2005 | 50 | Safidon | GEN | Bachan Singh Arya | M | IND | 43721 | Karamvir Saini | M | INC | 26077 |
| 2000 | 50 | Safidon | GEN | Ram Phal | M | INLD | 45382 | Bachan Singh Arya | M | INC | 37004 |
| 1996 | 50 | Safidon | GEN | Ramphal S/O Jodha Ram | M | SAP | 21502 | Ranbir Singh | M | HVP | 17301 |
| 1991 | 50 | Safidon | GEN | Bachan Singh Arya | M | INC | 22030 | Ram Phal | M | JP | 19433 |
| 1987 | 50 | Safidon | GEN | Sardul Singh Dhaliwal | M | IND | 41441 | Kundan Lal | M | INC | 14709 |
| 1982 | 50 | Safidon | GEN | Kundan Lal | M | INC | 17303 | Satvir Singh | M | LKD | 10335 |
| 1977 | 50 | Safidon | GEN | Choudhary Ram Kishan Bairagi | M | JNP | 18930 | Pratap Singh | M | INC | 7192 |
| 1972 | 30 | Safidon | GEN | Dhaja Ram | M | INC | 19570 | Sat Narain | M | VHP | 19462 |
| 1968 | 30 | Safidon | GEN | Satya Narain | M | VHP | 14895 | Ram Kishan | M | INC | 12655 |
| 1967 | 30 | Safidon | GEN | S. Krishan | M | INC | 17692 | S. Narain | M | IND | 11721 |

== Economy and infrastructure ==
▪ The main occupation of the people is agriculture. Half of the population involves in agricultural practices such as farming, horticulture, cattle rearing, dairy farming, etc.

▪ After agriculture, people do their private businesses. Main Bazaar, Hazi Kua Bazaar, Stadium Market, Subzi Mandi, and Railway Road Market are the major places of trade.

▪ Safidon, being the main city in Jind district, is also the site of a container rail terminal of the Container Corporation of India (CONCOR), and a bus terminal.

▪ Because it has the largest Mandi in district its economic place is very high. The new Anaj mandi located on Asandh Road also biggest mandi of Haryana more than 300 plus shops.

▪ Safidon is known for a number of rice silos plants.

▪ Safidon is known for hatchery and poultry farming, with more than 200 hatchery farms in the area.

▪ SKY Lark Hatchery is Most Popular Hatchery in Haryana Which Place in Khera Khemawati Village in Safidon Tehsil Jind

▪ Safidon is near to the industrial area of Panipat, but there is no four lane highway between Safidon to Panipat so the city is not progressing at much required pace. There is a railway line between Safidon and Panipat but there are only three trains a day. There is demand for more train service, but this is not being worked on.

== Places of interest ==
=== Historical and Religious ===
- Ancient Fort at Safidon: Situated in the heart of the city, near Nagshetra 'tirth'. This historical fort at Safidon was built by the rulers of Jind state in the 18th century AD. The history of Jind as a separate ruling state begins with 1763 AD. It is the first fort built by the rulers of Jind state who were the ancestors of Phulkian family. Afterwards, it was used as a military cantonment of the state. This fort has bastions for providing strength to the fortification, which were also used to ensure security.
- Nagakshetra Temple: It is the oldest temple in the city and the oldest temple in Haryana. Traditionally, this town Safidon is connected with Mahabharata story and it is said that Janmejay, the son of Parikshit, and grandson of Arjuna. had performed 'sarpyajna' (snake-sacrificial ritual) at this place after the death of his father, who was bitten by a snake. The name of Safidon was actually "SARPDAMAN" refers to this temple.
- Gurudwara Singhpura Sahib: 2 km (1.2 mi) away from Safidon City, a Gurudwara Sahib is located in Village Singhpura. This Gurudwara Sahib is constructed in the name of Guru Tegh Bahadur Ji, Sikh's 9th Guru.
- Dera Shri Baba Harsha Singh Ji: A historical place in the name of Dera Baba Shri Harsha Singh Ji at Village Singhpura. The dera is about 200 years old. According to the old people of village, there was no source of drinking water in the village at the time of the 19th century. All the women of village went to Safidon to bring the water. There was a well towards Safidon Railway Station. Women had to cover 2 km (1.2 mi) distance to bring drinkable water. After that villagers told all that incident briefly to Baba Harsha Singh Ji and request him to find solution to this problem. Then Baba Harsha Singh has decided to dig a well in village and he told all those facilities would come in the village. After that the well started for and there inside the well a tree called "dandi" tree was planted by Baba ji and said "whenever the tree is living the well water never got salted. It would coninuesly watering sweet water". The villagers constructed a dera in the name of Shri Baba Harsha Singh Ji in 1961. Every Sunday, mela or fair is organised at this place.
- Gurudwara Sachcha Sauda Sahib: A historical Gurudwara Sahib located on Assandh Road. The foundation brick of Gurudwara Sahib was brought up from Gurudwara Sachcha Sauda Sahib, Pakistan. On every New Moon Day or masya or amavasya , huge fair held here.
- Dasasvamedha Tirtha: It is at the village Didwara in Safidon Tehsil, 13 km (8.1 mi) north of Safidon; bathing there with devotion is considered to have the merit of ten Ashvamedha sacrifices.
- Aruna Tirtha lies at village Anta, 6 km (3.7 mi) south of Safidon. It is mentioned in the Mahabharata
- Suraj Kund built in honour of Sun God at Kalwa (15 km (9.3 mi) south-west of Safidon)
- Temple of Mahadeva at Barod (5.5 km (3.4 mi) north-east of Safidon)
- A tank named after the Vedic sage Vasishtha at Budha Khera (12 km (7.5 mi) north-west of Safidon)
- The Jain temple located in Old Safidon Anaj Mandi.
- The Jafariya Pir Baba Mukbara: A busy place.
- The Hanuman Mandir in the Main Bazaar.
- Sabal Singh Bavri Temple

=== Parks and stadiums ===
▪Ramsar Park, Safidon

▪Nagshetra Park, Safidon

▪Om Shanti Park, Safidon

▪Ramlila Ground & Park, Safidon

▪Maharaja Janmenjay Stadium, Safidon

▪Govt. Boys Sr. Sec. School Ground, Safidon

== Food and cuisine ==
Wheat is the staple food of Safidon, followed by rice. Varieties of cuisines are available in Safidon like North Indian, South Indian, Punjabi, Chinese, Continental, etc. Safidonese are mostly vegetarians.

== Notable people ==
- Choudhary Ram Kishan Bairagi (born 1938) - politician and member of the Legislative Assembly 1977-1982.
