= Jasrana, Sonipat =

Village in Haryana, India

Coordinates: 28.958°N 76.774°E

Jasrana is a village in the Gohana tehsil of Sonipat district of the Indian state of Haryana. Kaliraman Jats settled the village in 1126 AD. Later, Malik Jats came from Ahulana and Rewara. There are two panas in this village - Nirdai (Kaliraman's) and Ahulana (Malik's). The Jats constitute around 70% of the village population. Other than Jats there are many castes in this village. History of this village is given by Bhats.

It is situated 27 km away from tehsil headquarter Gohana (tehsildar office) and 27 km away from district headquarter Sonipat. It is surrounded by the villages named Gumana (Sonipat), Farmana Majra (Sonipat), Gorar (Sonipat), Mungan (Rohtak), and Polangi (Rohtak).

As per 2009 stats, Jasrana village is a gram panchayat.The present sarpanch of the village is Bhola Malik. The village comes under Baroda Assembly constituency and Sonipat Lok Sabha constituency.

The total geographical area of village is 792 hectares (7828.29 bighas) . With 748 houses, the population of the village is 3836. The male population of the village is 2106 and the female population is 1730. In 2023, the population is estimated to be around 4680 with around 800 houses.

The village has a Government Senior Secondary School from Classes 6th to 12th and a Government Primary School from Classes 1st to 5th. The village has a Shiv Mandir, Arya Samaj Trust and Shiv Hanuman Mandir, Dada Ghinke Mandir and Malu ala Khatu Shyam Mandir. The village also has a Government Ayurvedic Hospital.

Wrestler Bhuru Kaliraman and Asian bronze medalist boxer-Rajat Kaliraman are some of the gems of this village. Shooting medalist Aditi Kaliraman is one of the gems of the village.IAS Balbir Singh Malik also hailed from this village. Famous Arya samaj poet - Kunwar Jauhari Singh Arya (Malik), also hailed from this village. Previously MLA and freedom fighter - Nanhuram Malik is one of the prominent figures of the village.

Village has a canal for irrigation situated at the end of village named Jasrana Minor.
