= Barodi, Bhopal =

Barodi
- village
- Location within Madhya Pradesh Location within India
- Coordinates: 23.5358154°N 77.467329°E
- Country: India
- State: Madhya Pradesh
- District: Bhopal
- Tehsil: Berasia
- Elevation: 464 m (1,522 ft)

Population (2011)
  - Total: 1,062
- Time zone: UTC+5:30 (IST)
- ISO 3166 code: MP-IN
- 2011 census code: 482269

Barodi is a village in the Bhopal district of Madhya Pradesh, India. It is located in the Berasia tehsil.

== Demographics ==
According to the 2011 census of India, Barodi has 233 households. The effective literacy rate (i.e. the literacy rate of population excluding children aged 6 and below) is 80.84%.

Demographics (2011 Census)
	Total	Male	Female
Population	1062	549	513
Children aged below 6 years	159	81	78
Scheduled caste	453	237	216
Scheduled tribe	0	0	0
Literates	730	418	312
Workers (all)	440	259	181
Main workers (total)	135	117	18
Main workers: Cultivators	84	78	6
Main workers: Agricultural labourers	3	2	1
Main workers: Household industry workers	5	4	1
Main workers: Other	43	33	10
Marginal workers (total)	305	142	163
Marginal workers: Cultivators	3	0	3
Marginal workers: Agricultural labourers	288	134	154
Marginal workers: Household industry workers	2	1	1
Marginal workers: Others	12	7	5
Non-workers	622	290	332
