= Kiloi =

Village in India

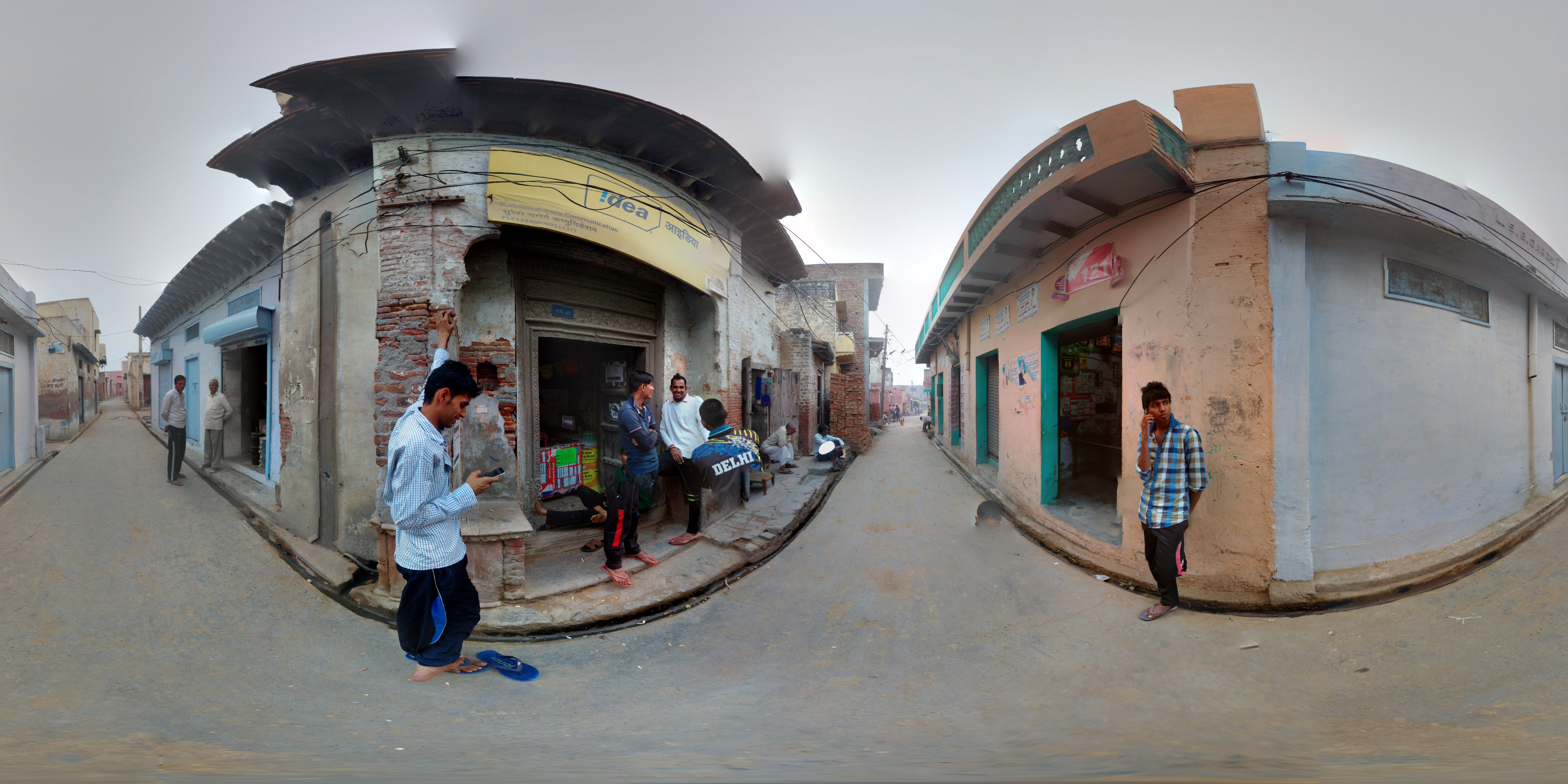
Street view of Kaloi at Garg Brothers place

Kaloi is a village in Rohtak district of Haryana, India. It is located 16 km from Rohtak. Initially, it was a part of Rohtak district. This is one of the very few villages which has two panchayats (Kaloi Dopana and Kaloi Khas). Villagers work in various fields such as agriculture, information technology, banking, business and in various government departments. Its pin code is 124401.

== Location ==
This village is situated in Rohtak district and located approximately 15 km far from the main city. Fairly connected to the main roads and has good road transport facilities to the villagers for commuting. The village is reachable from two sides of Rohtak Directly. Nearby villages are Rurki, Rithal, Gumana, Jasrana, Ladhot, Polangi and Bhalaut.

== Mandir ==
A prominent Lord Shiva temple (Shiv Mandir) is located on the outskirts of the village. According to local tradition, the temple was constructed after Shiva appeared in a dream to a local devotee. The site attracts local worshipers as well as visitors from surrounding areas, particularly during bi-annual fairs organized around Maha Shivratri

== School ==
Kiloi village has contributed a lot in Sarva Shiksha Abhiyan. There are many schools in the village and one ITI. The village has two government senior secondary schools and some private institutions such as:

- Hans Ram Memorial Senior Secondary School, Kiloi Rohtak Haryana
- Baba Nagar Das Public School, Kiloi, Rohtak, Haryana
- S.D. Public School, Kiloi, Rohtak, Haryana
- Sheetal Polytechnic.

== Post office ==
Kiloi has two panchayats but it has only one post office situated in Kiloi Dopana.

== Tourist place ==
Shiv Mandir is a religious place in Kiloi. People come here from all places.

- Shiv Mandir, Kiloi, Haryana
