= Garhi, Banswara =

Garhi
- village
- Location in Rajasthan, India Garhi (India)
- Coordinates: 23°36′N 74°8′E
- Country: India
- State: Rajasthan
- District: Banswara

Languages
  - Official: Hindi
- Time zone: UTC+5:30 (IST)
- Postal code: 327022
- Vehicle registration: RJ-03
- Coastline: 0 kilometres (0 mi)
- Nearest city: Partapur, Banswara, Sagwara, Dungarpur
- Civic agency: NAGAR PALIKA GARHI

Garhi is a small village and tehsil in Rajasthan, approximately 38 kilometres south of the Banswara District administrative seat, which is 600 km from the Rajasthan capital of Jaipur.

== Location ==
It is located at 23°36'0N 74°8'0E with an altitude of 148 metres (488 feet). It has basic facilities available nearby, such as banks, senior secondary school for girls and boys, teachers' training school.
