= Partapur, Rajasthan =

Partapur (Rajasthan) Pratapur
- Location in Rajasthan, India Partapur (Rajasthan) (India)
- Coordinates: 23.6°N 74.17°E
- Country: India
- State: Rajasthan
- District: Banswara
- Elevation: 164 m (538 ft)

Population (2024)
  - Total: 10,758

Languages
  - Official: Hindi Also [Wagdi]
- Time zone: UTC+5:30 (IST)
- Postal code: 327024
- ISO 3166 code: RJ-IN
- Vehicle registration: RJ-

Partapur is a City and municipality (Nagar Palika) in the Banswara district of the Indian state of Rajasthan. It is a developing area in the Wagad region and is the second most populated city in the Banswara district.

== Geography ==
Partapur's coordinates are 23.6°N 74.17°E. It has an average elevation of 164 metres (538 feet).

== Demographics ==
According to the Directorate of Census Operations, Rajasthan, India, as of 2011, the population of Partapur is 10,758 (not including the people in the age group 0-6). Of this population, 49.83% are male, and 50.17% are female. After merging with nearby areas, Partapur was designated as a Municipal Council. There are 1,399 children under the age of 7 in Partapur.
