= Julana =

Creature information
- Similar entities: Njirana (father)
- Folklore: Luritja and Jumu

Origin
- Region: Northern Territory and Western Australia

Julana is a deity of the Jumu and Luritja people of Western Australia and the Northern Territory in Australia. In the mythology of the Jumu and Luritja people, Julana is a lecherous spirit who surprises women by burrowing beneath the sand, leaping out, and raping them. When he was alive, he wandered the Earth with his father, Njirana, during the Dreaming.
