= Jind =

- City
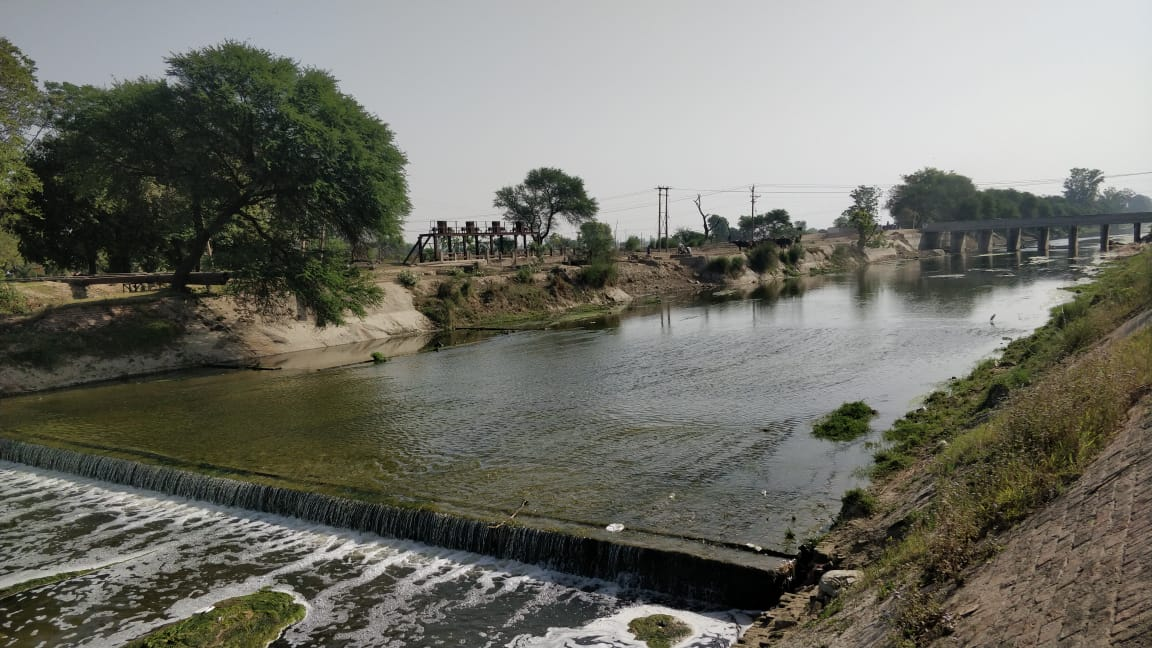
- View of Canal in Jind, Haryana, India
- Nickname: Heart of Haryana
- Location within Haryana Location within India
- Coordinates: 29°19′N 76°19′E
- Country: India
- State: Haryana
- District: Jind
- Named for: Jayanti (Daughter of Indra)

Government
  - Type: Municipal Council
  - Body: Municipal Council Jind
- Elevation: 227 m (745 ft)

Population (2011)
  - Total: 167,592
  - Density: 440/km^{2} (1,100/sq mi)

Languages
  - Official: Hindi, English
  - Regional: Haryanvi
- Time zone: UTC+5:30 (IST)
- PIN: 126102
- Railway station code: JIND
- Telephone code: 91-1681
- ISO 3166 code: IN-HR
- Vehicle registration: HR-31, HR-56 (Commercial)
- Nearest capitals: New Delhi, Chandigarh
- Sex ratio: 911 ♂/♀
- Literacy: 90%
- Lok Sabha constituency: Sonipat
- Vidhan Sabha constituency: Jind City
- Planning agency: HUDA(Haryana Urban Development Authority)
- Civic agency: Municipal Committee, Jind
- Climate: Cw (Köppen)
- Precipitation: 550 millimetres (22 in)
- Website: www.jind.nic.in

Jind is one of the largest and oldest cities in Jind district in the Indian state of Haryana. It is the administrative headquarter of Jind district. Rani Talab is the main destination for tourists while Pandu Pindara and Ramrai are the main religious spots, attracting devotees for the holy bath during Amavasya.

== Etymology ==
Jind was named Jayantapura after the victory of Lord Jayant (Indra), whom Pandavas worshipped before the Mahabharata war. According to oral tradition, Pandavas built the Jayanti Devi Temple in honour of Jyanti Devi (the goddess of victory, daughter of Indra). The temple is in the centre and whole Jind city was built around it. They offered prayers for success and then started a battle against Kaurava. The town was built around the temple and named Jayantapuri (Abode of Jyanti Devi) which was later renamed to Jind. After Pandavas won the Kurukshetra War they again returned back and stayed here for 14 years in the wait for Somavati Amawasya. The village Pandu Pindara at the outskirts of Jind city is named after the same.

== History ==
Jind was a part of the Indus Valley Civilisation. The site of Rakhigarhi, where one of the highest number of settlements happened during Indus valley, is 15 kilometres (9.3 mi) away from Jind city. It later became part of Kuru kingdom.

Jind is listed in the Ain-i-Akbari as a pargana under the sarkar of Hisar, producing a revenue of 5,401,749 dams for the imperial treasury and supplying a force of 4000 infantry and 500 cavalry. Under its entry, the author Abu'l-Fazl ibn Mubarak mentioned the Hindu temple in the nearby village of Pandu Pindara.

In 1775, Maharaja Gajpat Singh Sidhu built the Jind Fort, which later came under Maharani Jind Kaur, queen of Naresh Swarup Singh Sidhu - the Jat ruler of Jind State.

The Jat ruler Maharaja Gajpat Singh, the great-grandson of Chaudhary Phul Singh Sidhu and the founder of the Phulkian Misl, established an independent Sikh kingdom by seizing a large tract of the country with Sikh armed forces, which included the territory occupied by the present district of Jind from the Afghan governor Zain Khan in 1763. In 1775, Maharaja established Jind as the capital of the state in 1776. The fort of Jind was built by Sidhu Jat Sikh ruler Maharaja Gajpat Singh in 1776 AD. Sangrur was chosen later as the capital of Jind State by Raja Sangat Singh (reigned 1822 to 1834). It was under the suzerainty of the Maratha Empire for much of the 18th century. After independence, Jind State was merged with the Indian union and the territory of the district became part of the Sangrur district of the Patiala and East Punjab States Union (PEPSU) on 15 July 1948. On 1 November 1966, Sangrur district was divided in two and the Jind and Narwana tehsils were merged to form the Jind district. This was one of the seven districts of the newly formed Haryana state. The Jind tehsil was bifurcated further into two tehsils: Jind and Safidon in 1967.

== Geography ==
Jind is located at 29.32°N 76.32°E. It has an average elevation of 227 metres (744 feet).

== Demographics ==
As of 2011, the Indian census reported that Jind city had a population of 166,225. Males and females constituted 53.3% and 46.7% of the population, respectively. The sex ratio was measured at 877 compared to the national average of 940. The sex ratio for the zero to six year age group was at 831, which was lower than the national average of 918. Jind had an average literacy rate of 74%, higher than the national average of 64.3%. Male literacy was at 80%, while female literacy was at 67%. In Jind, there were 18,825 children under six years of age who made up 11.3% of the population in 2011. Haryanavi, Hindi and Punjabi are the languages spoken by most of the people.

== See also ==
- Alewa
- Rohtak
- Safidon
- Julana
- Meham
- Gohana
- Sonipat
- Narwana
- Rakhigarhi
