= Jind district =

Coordinates: 29°18′36″N 76°19′12″E

- District of Haryana
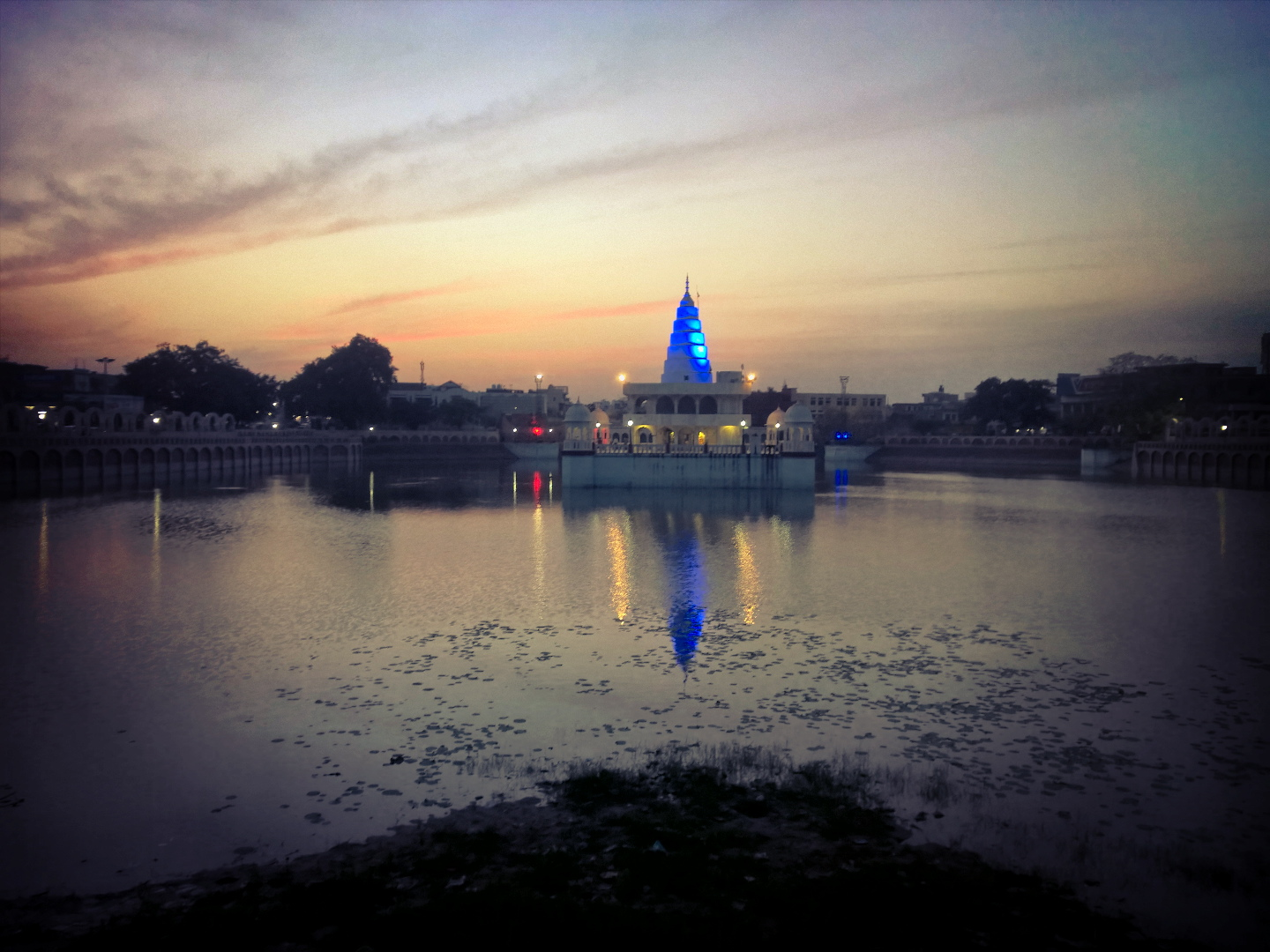
- Rani Talab in Bhuteshwar Temple, Jind

- Location in Haryana
- Country: India
- State: Haryana
- Division: Hisar
- Headquarters: Jind
- Tehsils: 1. Jind 2. Julana 3. Narwana 4. Safidon 5.Uchana

Area
  - Total: 2,702 km^{2} (1,043 sq mi)

Population (2011)
  - Total: 1,334,152
  - Density: 493.8/km^{2} (1,279/sq mi)

Demographics
  - Literacy: 72.7%
- Time zone: UTC+05:30 (IST)
- Average annual precipitation: 434 mm
- Lok Sabha constituencies: 1. Sonipat (shared with Sonipat district), 2, Hisar (shared with Hisar district), 3. Sirsa (shared with Sirsa district)
- Vidhan Sabha constituencies: 5
- Website: http://jind.nic.in/

Jind district is one of the 23 districts of Haryana state in northern India. Jind town is the administrative headquarters of the district. It is part of Hisar Division and was created in 1966.

== Etymology ==
The district derives its name from its headquarters town Jind that is said to be derived from Jaintapuri. It is also said that this town had been founded at the time of the Mahabharata. According to a legend, the Pandavas built a temple in honour of Jainti Devi (the goddess of victory), offered prayers for success, and then launched the battle with the Kauravas. The town grew up around the temple and was named Jaintapuri (Abode of Jainti Devi) which later on came to be known as Jind.

== History ==
Historical population
Year	Pop.	±% p.a.
1951	351,651	—
1961	467,416	+2.89%
1971	636,428	+3.13%
1981	796,902	+2.27%
1991	980,434	+2.09%
2001	1,189,827	+1.95%
2011	1,334,152	+1.15%

=== Jind Fort ===
Raja Gajpat Singh, a great-grandson of Chaudhary Phul Singh Sidhu Jat and the founder of the Phulkian Misl, established a kingdom by seizing a large tract of the country, which included the territory occupied by the present district of Jind, from the Afghan governor Zain Khan in 1763 and created Jind city, the capital of the state in 1776. He built a fort there in 1775. Later, Sangrur was chosen as the capital of Jind State by Raja Sangat Singh (reigned 1822 to 1834).

=== Zafargarh Fort ===
Zafargarh Fort (Quilla Jafargarh), built as a security post by rulers of Jind State, now lies in ruin and except the boundary wall of the fort the rest of the building has been destroyed. It lies south of Julana few meters southeast of the intersection of Jind-Rohtak NH-352 and NH-152D Trans-Haryana Expressway. In 2025, Haryana government announced a INR 95 crore restoration plan for upgrade of 20 monuments across the state including the Jind Fort and Zafargarh Fort.

=== Post-Independence after 1947 ===
After Independence, Jind and Patiala States were merged into the Indian Union on 15 July 1948, the Jind Tahsil of Jind State and mostly Narwana Tahsil of Patiala State were reorganized to form two new tahsils: Jind and Narwana in Sangrur district, which became part of the newly formed Patiala and East Punjab States Union (PEPSU).

During the reorganization of Punjab on 1 November 1966, Sangrur district was divided, and the Jind and Narwana tahsils were transferred to the newly created state of Haryana. These tahsils were combined to form the new Jind district, one of the seven original districts of Haryana. In 1967, Jind Tahsil was further split into two separate tahsils: Jind and Safidon.

In January 1973, 54 villages were transferred from Kaithal Tahsil of Karnal district to Jind district—43 to Jind, 5 to Safidon, and 6 to Narwana Tahsil. In 1974, the village of Barsola was also added to Jind Tahsil from Hansi Tahsil in Hisar district.

== Divisions ==
The district comprises three sub-divisions: Jind, Narwana and Safidon. Jind sub-division is further divided into three tehsils: Jind, Julana and Alewa (sub-tehsil). Narwana sub-division is further divided into two tehsils: Narwana and Uchana (sub-tehsil), and Safidon sub-division is also divided into two tehsils: Safidon and Pillu-Khera (sub-tehsil).

There are five Vidhan Sabha constituencies in this district: Jind, Julana, Safidon, Uchana Kalan and Narwana. Jind, Julana and Safidon are part of Sonipat Lok Sabha constituency. Narwana and Uchana Kalan are part of Sirsa and Hisar Lok Sabha constituencies respectively.

Jind town, the administrative headquarters, has an Arjun stadium, milk plant, cattle feed plant, and a large grain market. There are facilities for stay at PWD rest house, canal rest house, and market committee rest house. The town is well provided with schools, colleges, hospitals, and other basic amenities. Jind is noted for its numerous temples sacred to the worship of Shiva. Tradition assigns the settlement of the town to the Mahabharat period. Rani Talab is the major tourist attraction and Pandu-Pidara and Ramrai are the main devotional places attracting devotees for Amaavas bath.

== Demographics ==
According to the 2011 census Jind district has a population of 1,334,152, roughly equal to the nation of Mauritius or the US state of Maine. This gives it a ranking of 364th in India (out of a total of 640). The district has a population density of 493 inhabitants per square kilometre (1,280/sq mi). Its population growth rate over the decade 2001-2011 was 11.95%. Jind has a sex ratio of 870 females for every 1000 males, and a literacy rate of 72.7%. Scheduled Castes make up 21.16% of the population.

=== Religion ===
Religious groups in Jind District (British Punjab province era)
Religious group	1881		1891		1901		1911		1921		1931		1941	
Religious group	Pop.	%	Pop.	%	Pop.	%	Pop.	%	Pop.	%	Pop.	%	Pop.	%
Hinduism (Note: 1931-1941: Including Ad-Dharmis)	210,627	84.3%	230,846	81.12%	211,963	75.16%	210,222	77.36%	234,721	76.16%	243,561	75.02%	268,355	74.17%
Islam	34,247	13.71%	38,508	13.53%	38,717	13.73%	37,520	13.81%	43,251	14.03%	46,002	14.17%	50,972	14.09%
Sikhism	4,335	1.73%	15,020	5.28%	29,975	10.63%	22,566	8.3%	28,026	9.09%	33,290	10.25%	40,981	11.33%
Jainism	649	0.26%	173	0.06%	1,258	0.45%	1,233	0.45%	1,548	0.5%	1,613	0.5%	1,294	0.36%
Christianity	3	0%	7	0%	80	0.03%	187	0.07%	637	0.21%	210	0.06%	161	0.04%
Zoroastrianism	0	0%	0	0%	0	0%	0	0%	0	0%	0	0%	3	0%
Buddhism	0	0%	0	0%	0	0%	0	0%	0	0%	0	0%	3	0%
Judaism	—N/a	—N/a	6	0%	0	0%	0	0%	0	0%	0	0%	0	0%
Others	1	0%	0	0%	10	0%	0	0%	0	0%	0	0%	43	0.01%
Total population	249,862	100%	284,560	100%	282,003	100%	271,728	100%	308,183	100%	324,676	100%	361,812	100%
Note1: British Punjab province era district borders are not an exact match in the present-day due to various bifurcations to district borders — which since created new districts — throughout the historic Punjab Province region during the post-independence era that have taken into account population increases. Note 2: British Punjab province era figures refer to Jind State. Relative to present-day Jind district, the state excluded areas of contemporary Narwana tehsil but included Charkhi Dadri district along with some parts of contemporary Sangrur district, Bathinda district, and Patiala district.

Religion in Jind district (2011)
Religion	Percent
Hinduism	95.69%
Sikhism	2.18%
Islam	1.73%
Other or not stated	0.40%

Religious groups in Jind District (Modern era)
Religious group	1971	
Religious group	Pop.	%
Hinduism	6,11,573	95.62%
Sikhism	15,997	2.5%
Islam	7,650	1.2%
Jainism	4,230	0.66%
Others (Note: Including Buddhism, Zoroastrianism, Jews)	82	0.1%
Total population	639,610	100%

=== Languages ===
Languages of Jind district (2011)
1. Haryanvi (84.1%)
2. Hindi (12.4%)
3. Punjabi (2.80%)
4. Others (0.72%)

At the time of the 2011 Census of India, 84.07% of the population in the district spoke Haryanvi, 12.41% Hindi and 2.80% Punjabi as their first language

== See also ==
- Haryana Tourism
- List of Monuments of National Importance in Haryana
- List of State Protected Monuments in Haryana
- List of Indus Valley Civilization sites in Haryana
- List of National Parks & Wildlife Sanctuaries of Haryana, India
- Nachar Khera
- Jind State
